= Duke Road Racing Rankings =

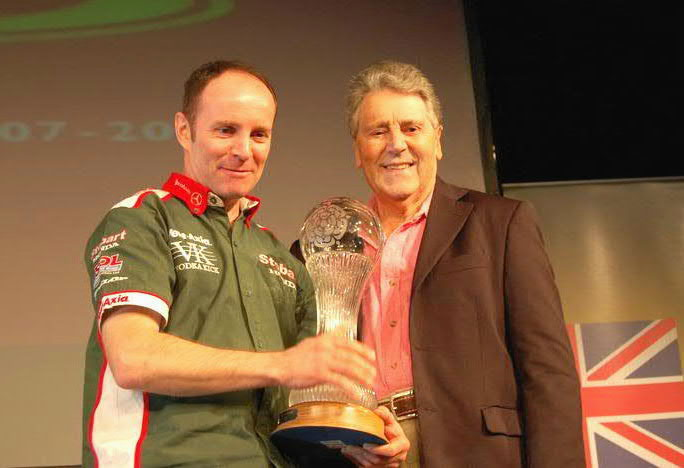
Ian Lougher receiving the Geoff Duke Trophy award for 2006 from Geoff Duke

The Duke Road Race Rankings was established in 2002 to analyse and acknowledge the season-long performances of riders involved in a series of motorcycle road racing events held on public roads. It was the idea of Isle of Man-based Peter Duke, son of former World Champion Geoff Duke, who in conjunction with road-racing journalist Leslie Moore, author Mac McDiarmid and archivist Phil Edge, developed a scoring system which would recognise the significance of the individual events. Riders' aggregate performances over a season-long assessment of several road racing events acknowledges the most consistent racer as the ‘championship’ winner. Since Ian Lougher's first-year win in 2002, all big names of road racing have been considered, such as Adrian Archibald, Richard Britton, Jason Griffiths, Darran Lindsay and, more recently, Manxman Conor Cummins.

== Background ==
The purpose of the Duke Road Race Rankings is to recognise achievements across the year by those riders who enter not just the ‘major’ meetings, but also the smaller road races. To be considered for the Geoff Duke Trophy, star names need to attend lower-profile events to earn points, helping to ensure strong grids for meetings which would otherwise be overshadowed by the main events – the Isle of Man TT, North West 200 and Ulster Grand Prix. The records show a split between Ryan Farquhar and Ian Lougher, apart from 2007 when Manxman Conor Cummins received the award in only his second full-season on the roads.

The Duke Road Race Rankings series features around two dozen meetings every year, including many of the long-established Irish and Isle of Man road races, and has remained largely unaltered since 2002 – apart from cancellations and the addition of extra meetings, such as the Armoy Road Races. The series received coverage in leading publications, such as Motor Cycle News, Road Racing Ireland and Bikesportnews, culminating in an annual presentation gathering.

== Results ==
The results of each year follows.

=== 2025 Results ===
Pos	Name	Total
1	(Northern Ireland) Michael Dunlop	1792
2	(England) Davey Todd	1707
3	(England) Rob Hodson	1492
4	(Republic of Ireland) Mike Browne	1363
5	(England) Dean Harrison	1160
6	(Republic of Ireland) Michael Sweeney	1000
7	(England) Aran Sadler	932
8	(Northern Ireland) Paul Jordan	901
9	(England) Joey Thompson	805
10	(England) Stephen Gorton	679

== 2024 season ==
The Duke Road Race Rankings commenced its 21st active season at the Bob Smith Spring Cup Road Races at Oliver's Mount over the weekend of 13 & 14 April.

=== 2024 Results ===
Pos	Name	Total
1	(England) Davey Todd	1616
2	(Northern Ireland) Gary McCoy	1584
3	(England) Rob Hodson	1409
4	(Northern Ireland) Michael Dunlop	1303
5	(Republic of Ireland) Mike Browne	1138
6	(England) Tom Weeden	1013
7	(England) Dominic Herbertson	819
8	(England) Jamie Coward	746
9	(England) Peter Hickman	745
10	(England) Stuart Hall	634

=== 2024 Circuits ===
1 Bob Smith Spring Cup – Oliver's Mount – Scarborough – (England) 13–14 April
2 Cookstown ‘100’ Road Races – (Northern Ireland) 26–27 April
3 North West ‘200’ Road Races – (Northern Ireland) 09/11 May
4 Pre-TT Classic Road Races – Billown – 24–26 May
5 Isle of Man TT Races – 27 May – 8 June
6 Barry Sheene Road Race Festival – Oliver's Mount – Scarborough – (England) 15–16 June
7 Southern ‘100’ International Road Races – 8–11 July
8 Cock o'the North Continental Road Race – Oliver's Mount – (England) 20–21 July
9 Armoy Road Races – (Northern Ireland) 26–27 July
10 Aberdare Park – (Wales) 3–4 August
11 Manx Grand Prix – 18–26 August
12 Macau Grand Prix – 14–17 November

== 2023 season ==
=== 2023 Results ===
Pos	Name	Total
1	(England) Dean Harrison	1468
2	(Northern Ireland) Michael Dunlop	1428
3	(England) Peter Hickman	889
4	(Northern Ireland) Gary McCoy	795
5	(England) Rob Hodsen	745
6	(Northern Ireland) Adam McLean	725
7	(England) Joey Thompson	699
8	(Republic of Ireland) Mike Browne	675
9	(England) Barry Furber	636
10	(England) Davey Todd	622

== 2022 season ==
The Duke Road Race Rankings gets fired-up for its 19th Championship season after a 2-year break due to Covid.

=== 2022 Results ===
Pos	Name	Total
1	(England) Davey Todd	1861
2	(Republic of Ireland) Michael Sweeney	1752
3	(England) Jamie Coward	1094
4	(England) Rod Hodson	1030
5	(Northern Ireland) Michael Dunlop	980
6	(England) Dean Harrison	922
7	(Northern Ireland) Adam McLean	853
8	(Republic of Ireland) Mike Browne	806
9	(England) Peter Hickman	618
10	(Republic of Ireland) Keelim Ryan	616

=== 2022 Circuits ===
1 Cookstown ‘100’ Road Races – (Northern Ireland) 22–23 April
2 Tandragee '100' Road Race – (Northern Ireland) 29–30 April
3 North West ‘200’ Road Races – (Northern Ireland) 12/14 May
4 Pre-TT Classic Road Races – Billown – 28–29 May
5 Isle of Man TT Races – 29 May – 10 June
6 Post TT Races – Billown – 11 June
7 Kells Road Races – (Republic of Ireland) 18–19 June
8 Munster 100 (Cork) Road Races – (Republic of Ireland) 25–26 June
9 Skerries '100' Road Races – (Republic of Ireland) 2–3 July
10 Walderstown Road Races – (Republic of Ireland) 9–10 July
11 Southern ‘100’ International Road Races – 11–14 July
12 Faugheen 50 Road Races – (Republic of Ireland) 16–17 July
13 Armoy Road Races – (Northern Ireland) 29–30 July
14 Manx Grand Prix – 21–29 August
15 Macau Grand Prix – 17–20 November

== 2019 season ==
The Duke Road Race Rankings gets fired-up for its 18th Championship season with the opening round of 2019 the KDM Hire Cookstown 100 Road Races on Friday and Saturday 26 & 27 April, which also kick-starts the Irish Road Race season.

Reigning Champion Mullingar's Derek McGee will commence the defence of his title at what is the first of a total of 25 rounds. The Duke Rankings organisers welcome back two rounds at the unique Oliver's Mount Course in July and September, after a 12-month sabbatical.

=== 2019 Results ===
Pos	Name	Total
1	(Republic of Ireland) Michael Sweeney	1774
2	(England) Dean Harrison	1493
3	(Republic of Ireland) Derek Sheils	1356
4	(England) Jamie Coward	1259
5	(England) Peter Hickman	1220
6	(Republic of Ireland) Derek McGee	1199
7	(Northern Ireland) Lee Johnston	1144
8	(Northern Ireland) Barry Davidson	886
9	(England) Dominic Herbertson	823
10	(England) Davey Todd	820

=== 2019 Circuits ===
1 Cookstown ‘100’ Road Races – (Northern Ireland) 26–27 April
2 Tandragee '100' Road Race – (Northern Ireland) 3–4 May
3 North West ‘200’ Road Races – (Northern Ireland) 16/18 May
4 Horice "300 Curves" – (Czech Republic) 18–19 May
5 Pre-TT Classic Road Races – Billown – 24–27 May
6 Isle of Man TT Races – 25 May – 7 June
7 Post TT Races – Billown – 8 June
8 Imatra Road Races – (Finland) 14–16 June
9 Kells Road Races – (Republic of Ireland) 15–16 June
10 Enniskillen Road Races – (Northern Ireland) 28–29 June
11 Skerries '100' Road Races – (Republic of Ireland) 6–7 July
12 Southern ‘100’ International Road Races – 8–11 July
13 Walderstown Road Races – (Republic of Ireland) 13–14 July
14 Faugheen 50 Road Races – (Republic of Ireland) 20–21 July
15 Armoy Road Races – (Northern Ireland) 26–27 July
16 Barry Sheene Road Race Festival – Oliver's Mount – Scarborough – (England) 27–28 July
17 Munster 100 (Cork) Road Races – (Republic of Ireland) 3–4 August
18 Ulster Grand Prix – (Northern Ireland) 7–10 August
19 Horice "Czech TT Road Races" – (Czech Republic) 17–18 August
20 Classic TT – 16–26 August
21 Manx Grand Prix – 16–30 August
22 East Coast Racing Festival (Killalane) – (Republic of Ireland) 7–8 September
23 Frohburg Road Races – (Germany) 21–22 September
24 Steve Henshaw Gold Cup International – Oliver's Mount – Scarborough – (England) 27–29 September
25 Macau Grand Prix – 14–17 November

== 2018 season ==
The 2018 Duke Road Race Rankings Championship gets underway over the weekend of 21 and 22 April, at the Bob Smith Spring Cup Road Races taking place over the popular Oliver's Mount Course – the first of four meetings at the Scarborough, Yorkshire venue this year. The Duke Road Race Rankings now in its 17th year of competition, having first been run in 2002, has a total of 25 rounds this year held in Northern Ireland, Eire, England, the Czech Republic, Finland and Germany. Over the 16 years of the Duke Road Race Rankings, seven overall winners have received the prestigious Geoff Duke Trophy.

Ian Lougher won in the first year and took the title again in consecutive years 2005 & 2006. Ryan Farquhar won his first rankings title in 2003, retaining the number one slot in 2004, then after loaning out the trophy for three years dominated proceedings for the five years 2008 – 2012. Seven championships in total!

Manxman Conor Cummins took the honours in 2007; Michael Dunlop in 2013; Yorkshireman James Cowton 2014; William Dunlop 2015, with the title going to Yorkshire for the second time in 2016 in the hands of Dean Harrison, who retained his title in 2017, taking top spot in the rankings table from the first round, taking seven race wins from seven starts and putting in seven fastest laps and holding that position throughout the 25 rounds.

Deans racing statistics for 2017 Duke Road Race Rankings Championship are, 23 race wins, 2 second places, 5 third places, a further 6 top six placings and seventh places, plus 16 fastest laps, 4 record laps and 1 absolute lap record during the Ulster Grand Prix at Dundrod. All of which earned him a total of 2506 points.

=== 2018 Results ===
Pos	Name	Total
1	(Republic of Ireland) Derek McGee	1324
2	(England) Dean Harrison	1307
3	(Northern Ireland) Adam McLean	1293
4	(Republic of Ireland) Michael Sweeney	975
5	(England) James Cowton	921
6	(England) Peter Hickman	887
7	(Northern Ireland) Michael Dunlop	825
8	(Northern Ireland) Barry Davidson	788
9	(England) Davey Todd	764
10	(Northern Ireland) Lee Johnston	645

=== 2018 Circuits ===
1 ~~Spring Cup Road Races Oliver's Mount – Scarborough~~ – (England) 21–22 April ...CANCELLED !!
2 Cookstown ‘100’ Road Races – (Northern Ireland) 27–28 April
3 Tandragee '100' Road Race – (Northern Ireland) 4–5 May
4 North West ‘200’ Road Races – (Northern Ireland) 17/19 May
5 Horice "300 Curves" – (Czech Republic) 21/22 May
6 Pre-TT Classic Road Races – Billown – 25–27 May
7 Isle of Man TT Races – 28 May – 8 June
8 Post TT Races – Billown – 9 June
9 ~~Kells Road Races~~ – (Republic of Ireland) 23–24 June ...CANCELLED !!
10 ~~Cock o'the North Continental Road Races – Oliver's Mount~~ – (England) 23–24 June ...CANCELLED !!
11 Enniskillen Road Races – (Northern Ireland) 29–30 June
12 Skerries '100' Road Races – (Republic of Ireland) 6–7 July
12a Imatra Road Races – (Finland) 6–8 July
14 Southern ‘100’ International Road Races – 6–12 July
15 Walderstown Road Races – (Republic of Ireland) 14–15 July
16 Faugheen 50 Road Races – (Republic of Ireland) 21–22 July
17 Armoy Road Races – (Northern Ireland) 27–28 July
18 ~~Barry Sheene Road Race Festival – Oliver's Mount – Scarborough~~ – (England) 28–29 July ...CANCELLED !!
19 Ulster Grand Prix – (Northern Ireland) 9/11 August
20 Horice "Czech TT Road Races" – (Czech Republic) 18–19 August
21 Classic TT – 25/27 August
22 Manx Grand Prix – 27–31 August
23 Killalane Road Races – (Republic of Ireland) 8–9 September
24 ~~Steve Henshaw Gold Cup International – Oliver's Mount – Scarborough~~ – (England) 22–23 September ...CANCELLED !!
25 Frohburg Road Races – (Germany) 22–23 September
26 Macau Grand Prix – 15–18 November

== 2017 season ==
The 2017 Duke Road Race Rankings Championship commences on Saturday and Sunday 22 & 23 April at Oliver's Mount, Scarborough with the Bob Smith Spring Cup Road Races.

Imatra has been added to this years Duke Road Race Rankings schedule, as the famous Finnish meeting forms for the first time, part of the prestigious roads series.

=== 2017 Results ===
Pos	Name	Total
1	(England) Dean Harrison	2506
2	(England) James Cowton	1761
3	(England) Ivan Lintin	1394
4	(England) Jamie Coward	1328
5	(Republic of Ireland) Derek McGee	1288
6	(Northern Ireland) Michael Dunlop	1268
7	(Republic of Ireland) Derek Sheils	1241
8	(England) Joey Thompson	1202
9	(Republic of Ireland) Joe Loughlin	1010
10	(Northern Ireland) Adam McLean	988

=== 2017 Circuits ===
1 Bob Smith Spring Cup Road Races – Oliver's Mount – Scarborough – (England) 22–23 April
2 Tandragee '100' Road Race – (Northern Ireland) 21–22 April
3 Cookstown ‘100’ Road Races – (Northern Ireland) 28–29 April
4 North West ‘200’ Road Races – (Northern Ireland) 11/13 May
5 Horice "300 Curves" – (Czech Republic) 20/21 May
6 Pre-TT Classic Road Races – Billown – 26–29 May
7 Isle of Man TT Races – 27 May – 9 June
8 Post TT Races – Billown – 10 June
9 Cock o'the North Continental Road Race – Oliver's Mount – (England) 24–25 June
10 Skerries '100' Road Races – (Republic of Ireland) 30 June – 1 July
11 Imatra Road Races – (Finland) 7–9 June
12 Walderstown Road Races – (Republic of Ireland) 8–9 July
12a Southern ‘100’ International Road Races – 10–13 July
14 Barry Sheene Road Race Festival – Oliver's Mount – Scarborough – (England) 22–23 July
15 Faugheen 50 Road Races – (Republic of Ireland) 22–23 July
16 Armoy Road Races – (Northern Ireland) 28–29 July
17 Dundrod ‘150’ Road Races – (Northern Ireland) 10 August
18 Ulster Grand Prix – (Northern Ireland) 12 August
19 Horice "Czech TT Races" – (Czech Republic) 26/27 August
20 Classic TT – 25–28 August
21 Manx Grand Prix – 29 Aug – 1 September
22 East Coast Racing Road Races – (Republic of Ireland) 9–10 September
23 Steve Henshaw Gold Cup International – Oliver's Mount – Scarborough – (England) 23–24 September
24 Macau Grand Prix – 16–19 November

== 2016 season ==
Dean Harrison Wins 'Geoff Duke Trophy'

Dean Harrison has secured the prestigious Duke Road Race Rankings Championship for 2016 becoming only the second Englishman to win the title since the series commenced in 2002.

The twenty-three round series which commenced at the Mid Antrim 150 National Road Races in Northern Ireland in early April and concluded at the recent Macau Motorcycle Grand Prix saw Dean making a cautious start to his 2016 season, his first with the Silkolene Engineering Yamaha Team, before dominating the Duke Road Race Rankings from late June.

The twenty-seven year old Yorkshireman joined the rankings at the second round at the Bob Smith Spring National held at Oliver's Mount slotting into third place slipping to ninth prior to the first International, the North West 200, recovering to eighth, then climbing back to third after the TT, topping the table after the Cock o'the North Road Races at Oliver's Mount, round 10 of this year's series.

From then on Dean headed the Rankings with Lincolnshire rider Ivan Lintin chasing hard to catch his Yorkshire neighbour, which was somewhat thwarted after a racing incident at the Southern 100, which left Ivan missing a number of rounds and him ending up second for the third year running.

2013 Duke Road Race Rankings Champion Michael Dunlop took third place.

Rising star Malachi Mitchell-Thomas riding for the John Burrows 'Cookstown' Team headed the 2016 rankings after the opening round at Mid Antrim and remained on the top rung until the TT, despite his untimely passing at the 2016 North West 200, such was his early season dominance.

Malachi finished in 17th place overall in this year's Duke Rankings.

Ian Hutchinson briefly topped the rankings after the TT, prior to Dean's 'throttle hold' on the Championship in the second half of the road racing season and after 23 rounds emerging as a worthy winner, becoming only the seventh rider to see his name engraved on the coveted Geoff Duke Trophy since the Championship Series started in 2002.

=== 2016 Results ===
Pos	Name	Total
1	(England) Dean Harrison	2690
2	(England) Ivan Lintin	1790
3	(Northern Ireland) Michael Dunlop	1735
4	(Republic of Ireland) Derek Sheils	1269
5	(England) Ian Hutchinson	1207
6	(England) James Cowton	1146
7	(Northern Ireland) William Dunlop	1127
8	(Isle of Man) Dan Kneen	928
9	(England) Jamie Coward	897
10	(Republic of Ireland) Michael Sweeney	851

=== 2016 Circuits ===
1 Antrim 150 Road Race – (Northern Ireland) 1–2 April
2 Bob Smith Spring Cup Road Races – Oliver's Mount – Scarborough – (England) 16–17 April
3 Tandragee '100' Road Race – (Northern Ireland) 22–23 April
4 Cookstown ‘100’ Road Races – (Northern Ireland) 29–30 April
5 North West ‘200’ Road Races – (Northern Ireland) 12/14 May
? Horice Road Races – (Czech Republic) 13–14 May??
7 Pre-TT Classic Road Races – Billown – 27–28 May
8 Isle of Man TT Races – 29 May – 10 June
9 Post TT Races – Billown – 11 June
10 Cock o'the North Continental Road Race – Oliver's Mount – (England) 18–19 June
11 Kells Road Races – (Republic of Ireland) 18–19 June
12 Skerries '100' Road Races – (Republic of Ireland) 1–2 July
12a Walderstown Road Races – (Republic of Ireland) 9–10 July
14 Southern ‘100’ Road Races – 11–14 July
15 Barry Sheene Road Race Festival – Oliver's Mount – Scarborough – (England) 23–24 July
16 Armoy Road Races – (Northern Ireland) 29–30 July
17 Aberdare Park – (Wales) 29–30 July
18 Dundrod ‘150’ Road Races – (Northern Ireland) 11 August
19 Ulster Grand Prix – (Northern Ireland) 13 August
20 ~~Cork Road Races~~ – (Republic of Ireland) 20–21 August ....CANCELLED
21 Classic TT – 26–29 August
22 Manx Grand Prix – 30 Aug – 2 September
23 ~~Killalane Road Races~~ – (Republic of Ireland) 10–11 September ....CANCELLED
24 Steve Henshaw Gold Cup International – Oliver's Mount – Scarborough – (England) 24–25 September
25 Macau Grand Prix – 17–19 November

== 2015 season ==
William Dunlop secured the prestigious Duke Road Race Rankings Championship in 2015, emulating his younger brother Michael who took the title two years ago in 2013.

The twenty-four round series which commenced at the Spring National Road Races at Oliver's Mount in April and concluded at the recent Macau Motorcycle Grand Prix saw William having a season long battle with fellow 'pure roads' rising star Ivan Lintin which was only resolved at the final round in the Southern hemisphere when the chequered flag fell.

Lincolnshire rider Ivan Lintin, riding for the R&C Express Team took an early lead in the 2015 series after the opening round at the North Yorkshire venue remaining in front until the fourth round, the first of the International rounds, the North West 200, where seven-times Duke Rankings winner Ryan Farquhar took over at the top of the table.

Ian Hutchinson took over the helm after the 2015 Isle of Man TT Races only for Ivan to regain the leadership after the Barry Sheene Race Festival held at Oliver's Mount, round nine – a lead he was to hold on to until the Ulster Grand Prix where William demoted him to second spot.

The Ballymoney rider continued to head the Duke Rankings as the European rounds were run and concluded once again at Oliver's Mount for the International Steve Henshaw Gold Cup Road Races in September with a mere 24 points separating the pair after 23 rounds with only Macau remaining.

Then Ivan Lintin received an invite to compete and his team R&C Express took up the offer. Ivan making his debut on the 3.8028 mile Circuit da Guia course had to finish in the top six.

William Dunlop opened his Duke Rankings account at the second round, the Cookstown 100 taking 13th spot in the table, quickly moving into third after a very wet Tandragee 100, the climbing to second.

A double race victory and record lap at the 'Race of Legends' at Armoy William was back in second spot and so to Dundrod and the Ulster Grand Prix in mixed conditions a 2nd; 4th; 5th; 6th & 10th was enough to put the Tyco Team rider at the top of the Duke Rankings becoming only the sixth rider to see his name engraved on the coveted Geoff Duke Trophy since the Championship Series started in 2002.

=== 2015 Results ===
Pos	Name	Total
1	(Northern Ireland) William Dunlop	1822
2	(England) Ivan Lintin	1798
3	(England) Dean Harrison	1716
4	(England) James Cowton	1536
5	(Republic of Ireland) Derek McGee	1445
6	(Northern Ireland) Lee Johnston	1247
7	(Northern Ireland) Michael Dunlop	1076
8	(England) Guy Martin	978
9	(Northern Ireland) Ryan Farquhar	954
10	(Northern Ireland) Seamus Elliott	931

=== 2015 Circuits ===
1 Ian Watson Spring Cup Road Races – Oliver's Mount – Scarborough – (England) 11–12 April
2 Cookstown ‘100’ Road Races – (Northern Ireland) 25 April
3 Tandragee '100' Road Race – (Northern Ireland) 2 May
4 North West ‘200’ Road Races – (Northern Ireland) 14/16 May
5 Horice Road Races – (Czech Republic) 16/17 May
6 Pre-TT Classic Road Races – Billown – 22–24 May
7 Isle of Man TT Races – 30 May – 5 June
8 Post TT Races – Billown – 6 June
9 Barry Sheene Classic Road Races – (England) 20–21 June
10 Kells Road Races – (Republic of Ireland) 28 June
11 Skerries '100' Road Races – (Republic of Ireland) 4 July
12 Southern ‘100’ Road Races – 6–9 July
12a Walderstown Road Races – (Republic of Ireland) 11 July
14 Cock o'the North Continental Road Race – Oliver's Mount – (England) 18–19 July
15 Armoy Road Races – (Northern Ireland) 25 July
16 Dundrod ‘150’ Road Races – (Northern Ireland) 6 August
17 Ulster Grand Prix – (Northern Ireland) 8 August
18 Faugheen Road Races – (Republic of Ireland) 15–16 August
19 Classic TT – 29–31 August
20 Manx Grand Prix – 2–4 September
21 Killalane Road Races – (Republic of Ireland) 5–6 September
22 Steve Henshaw Gold Cup International – Oliver's Mount – Scarborough – (England) 12–13 September
23 Macau Grand Prix – 21 November

== 2014 season ==
The winner of the 2014 Duke Road Race Rankings was honoured at the Auto 66 Dinner & Prize Presentation which took place on Saturday, 17 January at the Holiday Inn, York. Yorkshire's James Cowton becomes the 13th winner of the Duke Road Race Rankings series since its inception in 2002 and the first English rider to collect the prestigious award.

Twenty-two year old James had a stellar season on the roads, his third year racing 'between the hedges' amassing six race victories during the year, at Oliver's Mount, Billown and Dundrod, where he took his first international race win at the Ulster Grand Prix.

James' first victory of the year was at the Blackford's Pre-TT Classic races in the Post Classic race where he also set a new lap record, following that with a double at the Barry Sheene Race Festival at his home circuit, Oliver's Mount before taking another double win at the Dundrod 150 Road Races.

Add in a further nine second and 13 third places out of the 45 races he finished, only three were out of the top six whilst setting seven fastest laps.

James received the coveted Geoff Duke Trophy and its replica, becoming only the sixth recipient of the award in its 13-year history. The presentation was made by Peter Duke, managing director of Duke Marketing and son of Geoff Duke. The award is regarded as a measure of seasonal success among riders competing in “between the hedges” road racing, as it considers performances across both prominent international events and lesser-known national competitions.

The 2014 Duke Road Race Rankings was held over 25 rounds commencing at the Spring National Road Races at the North Yorkshire venue of Oliver's Mount in mid April and concluded mid November at the Macau Motorcycle Grand Prix, James was third in the table after the opening round and throughout the season maintained a position in the top six, slotting into second after the Ulster Grand Prix climbing on to the top rung after the Steve Henshaw International Gold Cup Road Races, the penultimate round, the final round at Macau un-affecting the top three positions.

Peter Duke commented: 'Another thrilling season with 479 point-scoring riders underlines the increasing popularity of real roads racing and I am extremely proud that the Duke Series plays its part in the sport.

'It's often thought Irish riders dominate road racing, but this years results showcase the talent and enthusiasm for 'closed roads' in the rest of the British Isles. Long may it continue!'

=== 2014 results ===
Pos	Name	Total
1	(England) James Cowton	1858
2	(England) Ivan Lintin	1817
3	(England) Dean Harrison	1799
4	(Northern Ireland) Michael Dunlop	1591
5	(Isle of Man) Dan Kneen	1408
6	(England) Guy Martin	1372
7	(Northern Ireland) Jamie Hamilton	1116
8	(Northern Ireland) Seamus Elliott	1074
9	(Northern Ireland) Lee Johnston	1047
10	(Republic of Ireland) Michael Sweeney	1014

=== 2014 Circuits ===
1 Ian Watson Spring Cup Road Races – Oliver's Mount – Scarborough – (England) 13 April
2 Cookstown ‘100’ Road Races – (Northern Ireland) 26 April
3 Tandragee '100' Road Race – (Northern Ireland) 3 May
4 North West ‘200’ Road Races – (Northern Ireland) 15/17 May
5 Horice Road Races – (Czech Republic) 17/18 May
6 Pre-TT Classic Road Races – Billown – 23–26 May
7 Isle of Man TT Races – 31 May – 6 June
8 Post TT Races – Billown – 7 June
9 Barry Sheene Classic Road Races – (England) 21–22 June
10 Kells Road Races – (Republic of Ireland) 22 June
11 Bush Road Races – (Northern Ireland) 28 June
12 Skerries '100' Road Races – (Republic of Ireland) 5 July
12a Southern ‘100’ Road Races – 7–10 July
14 Walderstown Road Races – (Republic of Ireland) 13 July
15 Cork (Glanmire) Road Races – (Republic of Ireland) 20 July
16 Cock o'the North Continental Road Race – Oliver's Mount – (England) 19–20 July
17 Armoy Road Races – (Northern Ireland) 26 July
18 Czech TT Road Races – (Czech Republic) 9–10 August
19 Cahir Road Races – (Republic of Ireland) 10 August
20 Dundrod ‘150’ Road Races – (Northern Ireland) 14 August
21 Ulster Grand Prix – (Northern Ireland) 16 August
22 Classic TT – 23–25 August
23 Manx Grand Prix – 25–29 August
24 Killalane Road Races – (Republic of Ireland) 7 September
25 Steve Henshaw Gold Cup International – Oliver's Mount – Scarborough – (England) 13–14 September
26 Macau Grand Prix – 15 November

== 2013 season ==
The Duke Road Race Rankings Series commenced for its 12th year of competition at Oliver's Mount, Scarborough, North Yorkshire on 21 April 2013 at the Ian Watson Spring Cup National Road Races, organised by the Auto 66 Club.

The overall winner in this year was Michael Dunlop who won four races in a week at the Isle of Man TT and won at the North West 200, Ulster Grand Prix, Armoy Road Races, Southern 100 and for the first time won the Steve Henshaw International Gold Cup.

=== 2013 Results ===
Pos	Name	Total
1	(Northern Ireland) Michael Dunlop	2729
2	(England) Dean Harrison	1912
3	(Northern Ireland) Jamie Hamilton	1845
4	(England) Guy Martin	1740
5	(Northern Ireland) William Dunlop	1688
6	(England) James Cowton	1116
7	(England) Chris Palmer	1093
8	(Republic of Ireland) Michael Sweeney	1076
9	(England) Ivan Lintin	826
10	(New Zealand) Bruce Anstey	824

=== 2013 Circuits ===
1 Ian Watson Spring National Road Races – Oliver's Mount – Scarborough – (England) 21 April
2 Cookstown ‘100’ Road Races – (Northern Ireland) 27 April
3 Tandragee '100' Road Race – (Northern Ireland) 4 May
4 North West ‘200’ Road Races – (Northern Ireland) 16/18 May
5 Horice Road Races – (Czech Republic) 19 May
6 Pre-TT Classic Road Races – Billown – 24–27 May
7 Isle of Man TT Races – 1–7 June
8 Post TT Races – Billown – 8 June
9 Barry Sheene Classic Road Races – (England) 15–16 June
10 Cork (Glanmire) Road Races – (Republic of Ireland) 16 June
11 Skerries '100' Road Races – (Republic of Ireland) 6 July
12 Southern ‘100’ Road Races – 8–11 July
12a Walderstown Road Races – (Republic of Ireland) 13–14 July
14 Cock o'the North – Oliver's Mount – (England) 20–21 July
15 Armoy Road Races – (Northern Ireland) 27 July
16 Mid Antrim ‘150’ Road Races – (Northern Ireland) 3 August
17 Athea Road Races – (Republic of Ireland) 11 August
18 Dundrod ‘150’ Road Races – (Northern Ireland) 15 August
19 Ulster Grand Prix – (Northern Ireland) 17 August
20 Classic TT – 24–25 August
21 Manx Grand Prix – 28–30 August
22 Terlicko Road Races – (Czech Republic) 31–1 September
23 Killalane Road Races – (Republic of Ireland) 7–8 September
24 Gold Cup International – Oliver's Mount – Scarborough – (England) 14–15 September
25 Macau Grand Prix – 14–16 November

== 2012 season ==
The Duke Road Race Rankings Series commenced for its 11th year of competition at Oliver's Mount, Scarborough, North Yorkshire on Sunday 15 April 2012 at the Ian Watson Spring Cup National Road Races. Organised by the Auto 66 Club.

=== 2012 Results ===
Pos	Name	Total
1	(Northern Ireland) Ryan Farquhar	3468
2	(Northern Ireland) Michael Dunlop	2163
3	(Northern Ireland) William Dunlop	1480
4	(England) Guy Martin	1183
5	(Northern Ireland) Jamie Hamilton	1164
6	(England) Chris Palmer	1157
7	(England) Dean Harrison	1111
8	(England) Ivan Lintin	809
9	(New Zealand) Bruce Anstey	754
10	(England) John McGuinness	704

=== 2012 Circuits ===
1 Ian Watson Spring National Road Races – Oliver's Mount – Scarborough – (England) 15 April
2 Cookstown ‘100’ Road Races – (Northern Ireland) 28 April
3 Tandragee '100' Road Race – (Northern Ireland) 5 May
4 North West ‘200’ Road Races – (Northern Ireland) 17th/19 May
5 Pre-TT Classic Road Races – Billown – 25–28 May
6 Isle of Man TT Races – 2–8 June
7 Post TT Races – Billown – 9 June
8 Mid Antrim ‘150’ Road Races – (Northern Ireland) 16 June
9 Bush Road Races – (Northern Ireland) 23 June
10 Barry Sheene Classic Road Races – (England) 24 June
11 ~~Kells Road Races~~ – (Republic of Ireland) 30 June – 1 July ....CANCELLED
12 Skerries '100' Road Races – (Republic of Ireland) 7 July
13 Southern ‘100’ Road Races – 9–12 July
14 Walderstown Road Races – (Republic of Ireland) 14–15 July
15 ~~Munster '100' Road Races~~ – (Republic of Ireland) 21–22 July ....CANCELLED
16 Cock o'the North – Oliver's Mount – (England) 21–22 July
17 Armoy Road Races – (Northern Ireland) 28 July
18 Aderdare Park Road Races – (Wales) 28–29 July
19 ~~Athea Road Races~~ – (Republic of Ireland) 4–5 August ....CANCELLED
20 Dundrod ‘150’ Road Races – (Northern Ireland) 9 August
21 Ulster Grand Prix – (Northern Ireland) 11 August
22 Manx Grand Prix – 18–31 August
23 ~~Faugheen '50' Road Races~~ – (Republic of Ireland) 25–26 August ....CANCELLED
24 Killalane Road Races – (Republic of Ireland) 8–9 September
25 Gold Cup International – Oliver's Mount – Scarborough – (England) 15–16 September
26 Macau Grand Prix – 15–18 November

== 2011 season ==
The Duke Road Race Rankings celebrated its 10th year in 2011. Ryan Farquhar retained the Duke Road Rankings title for the fourth successive year, his sixth time in all and received the 'new' Geoff Duke Trophy at the Adelaide Motorcycle Awards Night in Belfast in January 2012. Farquhar has the original trophy in his permanent collection, having won the award outright after completing a hat-trick of title wins in 2008, 2009 and 2010.

=== 2011 Results ===
Pos	Name	Total
1	(Northern Ireland) Ryan Farquhar	3754
2	(Northern Ireland) William Dunlop	2726
3	(Northern Ireland) Michael Dunlop	2696
4	(Wales) Ian Lougher	1281
5	(Northern Ireland) John Burrows	1171
6	(England) Chris Palmer	1076
7	(England) Guy Martin	1011
8	(Australia) Cameron Donald	834
9	(England) Davy Morgan	786
10	(Republic of Ireland) Ronan Pentony	765

Ryan Farquhar said he was 'made up' to win his sixth Duke Road Race Rankings Series after another superb season on his KMR Kawasaki machines. The Dungannon racer claimed 43 victories and 11 podium finishes on his way to a winning points tally of 3,754.

William Dunlop claimed second place ahead of brother Michael, who won a second TT title in 2011. Farquhar set 27 fastest laps during the 23-round series but said he was disappointed at not claiming more wins at the International road races. Farquhar won at both the Manx Grand Prix and Southern 100 meetings on the Isle of Man in this year.

Ian Lougher, who was the inaugural winner in 2002 and took the titles again in 2005 and 2006, finished in fourth place.

=== 2011 Circuits ===
1 Ian Watson Spring National Road Races – Oliver's Mount – Scarborough – (England)
2 Cookstown ‘100’ Road Races – (Northern Ireland)
3 Tandragee '100' Road Race – (Northern Ireland)
4 North West ‘200’ Road Races – (Northern Ireland)
5 Pre-TT Classic Road Races – Billown –
6 Isle of Man TT Races –
7 Post TT Races – Billown –
8 Bush Road Races – (Northern Ireland)
9 Skerries '100' Road Races – (Republic of Ireland)
10 Barry Sheene Classic Road Races – (England)
11 Walderstown Road Races – (Republic of Ireland)
12 Aderdare Park Road Races – (Wales)
13 Southern ‘100’ Road Races –
14 Kells Road Races – (Republic of Ireland)
15 Faugheen '50' Road Races – (Republic of Ireland)
16 Cock o'the North – Oliver's Mount – (England)
17 Armoy Road Races – (Northern Ireland)
18 Mid Antrim ‘150’ Road Races – (Northern Ireland)
19 Dundrod ‘150’ Road Races – (Northern Ireland)
20 Ulster Grand Prix – (Northern Ireland)
21 Manx Grand Prix –
22 Munster '100' Road Races – (Republic of Ireland)
23 Athea Road Races – (Republic of Ireland)
24 Killalane Road Races – (Republic of Ireland)
25 Gold Cup International – Oliver's Mount – Scarborough – (England)
26 Macau Grand Prix –

== 2010 season ==
=== 2010 Results ===
Pos	Name	Total
1	(Northern Ireland) Ryan Farquhar	4444
2	(Northern Ireland) William Dunlop	2169
3	(Northern Ireland) Michael Dunlop	1857
4	(England) Ian Hutchinson	1570
5	(Scotland) Keith Amor	1090
6	(Wales) Ian Lougher	1039
7	(England) Chris Palmer	1017
8	(Northern Ireland) John Burrows	934
9	(England) Guy Martin	703
10	(Northern Ireland) Michael Pearson	677

=== 2010 Circuits ===
1 Spring National – Oliver's Mount – Scarborough – (England)
2 Cookstown ‘100’ Road Races – (Northern Ireland)
3 North West ‘200’ Road Races – (Northern Ireland)
4 Pre-TT Classic Road Races – Billown –
5 Isle of Man TT Races –
6 Post TT Races – Billown –
7 Bush Road Races – (Northern Ireland)
8 ~~Athea Road Races~~ – (Republic of Ireland) CANCELLED !!
9 Skerries Road Races – (Republic of Ireland)
10 Barry Sheene Classic Road Races – (England)
11 Cock o'the North – Oliver's Mount – (England)
12 Walderstown Road Races – (Republic of Ireland)
12a Southern ‘100’ Road Races –
14 Jurby ‘South’ Road Races –
15 ~~Kells Road Races~~ – (Republic of Ireland) CANCELLED due to Weather
16 Faugheen Road Races – (Republic of Ireland)
17 Mid Antrim ‘150’ Road Races – (Northern Ireland)
18 Armoy Road Races – (Northern Ireland)
19 Dundrod ‘150’ Road Races – (Northern Ireland)
20 Ulster Grand Prix – (Northern Ireland)
21 Munster ‘100’ Road Races – (Republic of Ireland)
22 Manx Grand Prix –
23 Killalane Road Races – (Republic of Ireland)
24 Gold Cup International – Oliver's Mount – Scarborough – (England)
25 Boyne ‘100’ Road Races – (Republic of Ireland)
26 Macau Grand Prix –

== 2009 season ==
=== 2009 Results ===
Pos	Name	Total
1	(Northern Ireland) Ryan Farquhar	4860
2	(Northern Ireland) Michael Dunlop	2506
3	(Northern Ireland) William Dunlop	2429
4	(Wales) Ian Lougher	2109
5	(Northern Ireland) John Burrows	1350
6	(England) Guy Martin	1251
7	(England) Ian Hutchinson	1028
8	(Scotland) Keith Amor	991
9	(Northern Ireland) Michael Pearson	924
10	(Isle of Man) Conor Cummins	900

=== 2009 Circuits ===
1 Spring National – Oliver's Mount – Scarborough – (England)
2 Cookstown ‘100’ Road Races – (Northern Ireland)
3 Tandragee '100' Road Race – (Northern Ireland)
4 North West ‘200’ Road Races – (Northern Ireland)
5 Barry Sheene Classic Road Races – Oliver's Mount – Scarborough – (England)
6 Pre-TT Classic Road Races – Billown –
7 Isle of Man TT Races –
8 Billown TT Races –
9 Bush Road Races – (Northern Ireland)
10 Athea Road Races – (Republic of Ireland)
11 Skerries Road Races – (Republic of Ireland)
12 Cock o'the North – Oliver's Mount – (England)
12a Walderstown Road Races – (Republic of Ireland)
14 Southern ‘100’ Road Races –
15 Jurby ‘South’ Road Races –
16 Kells Road Races – (Republic of Ireland)
17 Faugheen Road Races – (Republic of Ireland)
18 Mid Antrim ‘150’ Road Races – (Northern Ireland)
19 Armoy Road Races – (Northern Ireland)
20 Dundrod ‘150’ Road Races – (Northern Ireland)
21 Ulster Grand Prix – (Northern Ireland)
22 Manx Grand Prix –
23 Killalane Road Races – (Republic of Ireland)
24 Gold Cup International – Oliver's Mount – Scarborough – (England)
25 Boyne ‘100’ Road Races – (Republic of Ireland)

== 2008 season ==
=== 2008 Results ===
Pos	Name	Total
1	(Northern Ireland) Ryan Farquhar	2306
2	(Wales) Ian Lougher	2058
3	(Northern Ireland) Michael Dunlop	1632
4	(Northern Ireland) William Dunlop	1379
5	(England) Chris Palmer	1037
6	(Scotland) Keith Amor	1034
7	(England) Guy Martin	709
8	(England) John McGuinness	662
9	(Republic of Ireland) Damien Howard	563
10	(England) Mick Goodings	547

TT winner Ryan Farquhar clinched the Duke Road Race Rankings for the third time, closing a successful 2008 season by clinching the rankings title at the final meeting of the year, the Gold Cup races at Oliver's Mount, Scarborough. The 2008 Duke Road Race Rankings had been scheduled to be held over 23 rounds, but that number was cut to 19 due to four race meetings being hit by bad weather and other factors.

=== 2008 Circuits ===
1 Spring National – Oliver's Mount – Scarborough – (England)
2 Cookstown ‘100’ Road Races – (Northern Ireland)
3 Tandragee ‘100’ Road Races – (Northern Ireland)
4 North West ‘200’ Road Races – (Northern Ireland)
5 Isle of Man TT Races –
6 Steam Packet Races – Billown –
7 Bush Road Races – (Northern Ireland)
8 Athea Road Races(1) – (Republic of Ireland)
9 Skerries Road Races – (Northern Ireland)
10 Southern ‘100’ Road Races –
11 Cock o'the North – Oliver's Mount – Scarborough – (England)
12 Jurby ‘South’ Road Races –
13 Walderstown Road Races – (Republic of Ireland)
14 Kells Road Races – (Republic of Ireland)
15 Faugheen Road Races – (Republic of Ireland)
16 Dundalk Road Races – (Republic of Ireland)
17 Dundrod ‘150’ Road Races – (Northern Ireland)
18 Ulster Grand Prix – (Northern Ireland)
19 Manx Grand Prix –
20 Killalane Road Races – (Republic of Ireland)
21 Boyne ‘100’ Road Races – (Republic of Ireland)
22 Gold Cup International – Oliver's Mount – Scarborough – (England)
23 Athea Road Races(2) – (Republic of Ireland)

== Previous winners ==
=== 2007 ===
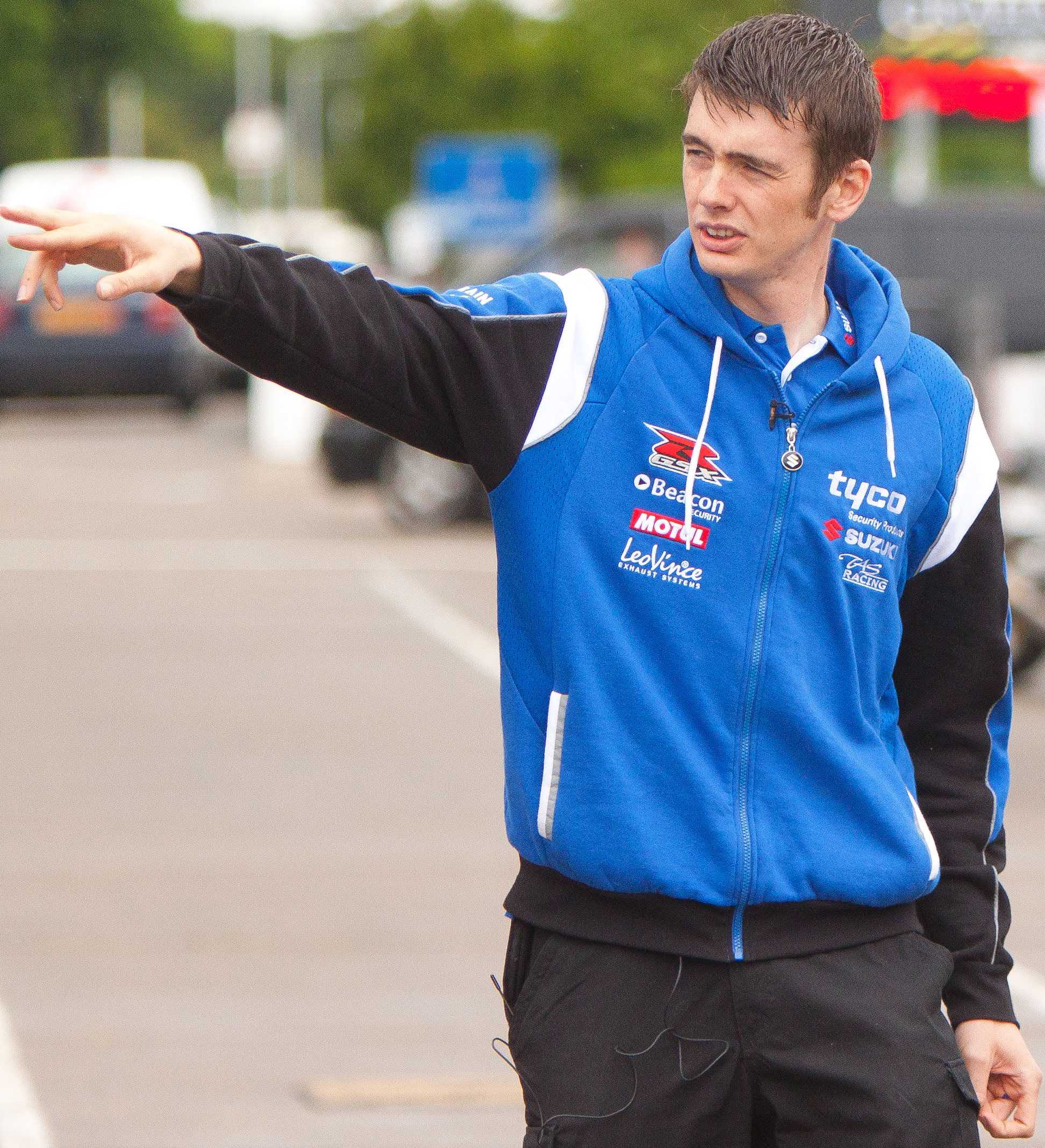
Cummins at TT paddock in 2012

One of the upcoming riders from the Centenary TT races secured the Geoff Duke Trophy. Manxman Conor Cummins, who placed fifth, two sixths and an eighth at TT, secured the top position in the rankings during his first full-year of pure road racing.

Guy Martin, who secured three podium finishes at the Centenary TT, finished in second place, 138 points behind, but 281 points ahead of third placed William Dunlop.

Pos	Name	Total
1	(Isle of Man) Conor Cummins	1936
2	(England) Guy Martin	1798
3	(Northern Ireland) William Dunlop	1517
4	(Wales) Ian Lougher	1380
5	(England) Chris Palmer	1131
6	(England) John McGuinness	1042
7	(Australia) Cameron Donald	961
8	(Northern Ireland) Ryan Farquhar	908
9	(Republic of Ireland) Darren Burns	852
10	(England) Ivan Lintin	825

=== 2006 ===
The twenty-five round series were held at all national and international road races in the north and south of Ireland, the Isle of Man and England. At the conclusion 147 points separated the champion and second place man, Martin Finnegan, who in turn was just nine points ahead of the late Darran Lindsay.

Pos	Name	Total
1	(Wales) Ian Lougher	1719
2	(Northern Ireland) Martin Finnegan	1572
3	(Northern Ireland) Darran Lindsay	1563
4	(England) Guy Martin	1382
5	(Northern Ireland) Raymond Porter	1245
6	(Australia) Cameron Donald	1090
7	(Northern Ireland) Michael Dunlop	1049
8	(Northern Ireland) John Burrows	956
9	(Northern Ireland) William Dunlop	852
10	(Northern Ireland) Robert Dunlop	830

=== 2005 ===
Pos	Name	Total
1	(Wales) Ian Lougher	2699
2	(Northern Ireland) Ryan Farquhar	2229
3	(England) Guy Martin	1798
4	(Republic of Ireland) Richard Britton	1400
5	(England) Chris Palmer	1183
6	(Northern Ireland) Martin Finnegan	973
7	(Northern Ireland) Adrian Archibald	873
8	(England) John McGuinness	782
9	(Wales) Jason Griffiths	739
10	(New Zealand) Bruce Anstey	728

=== 2004 ===
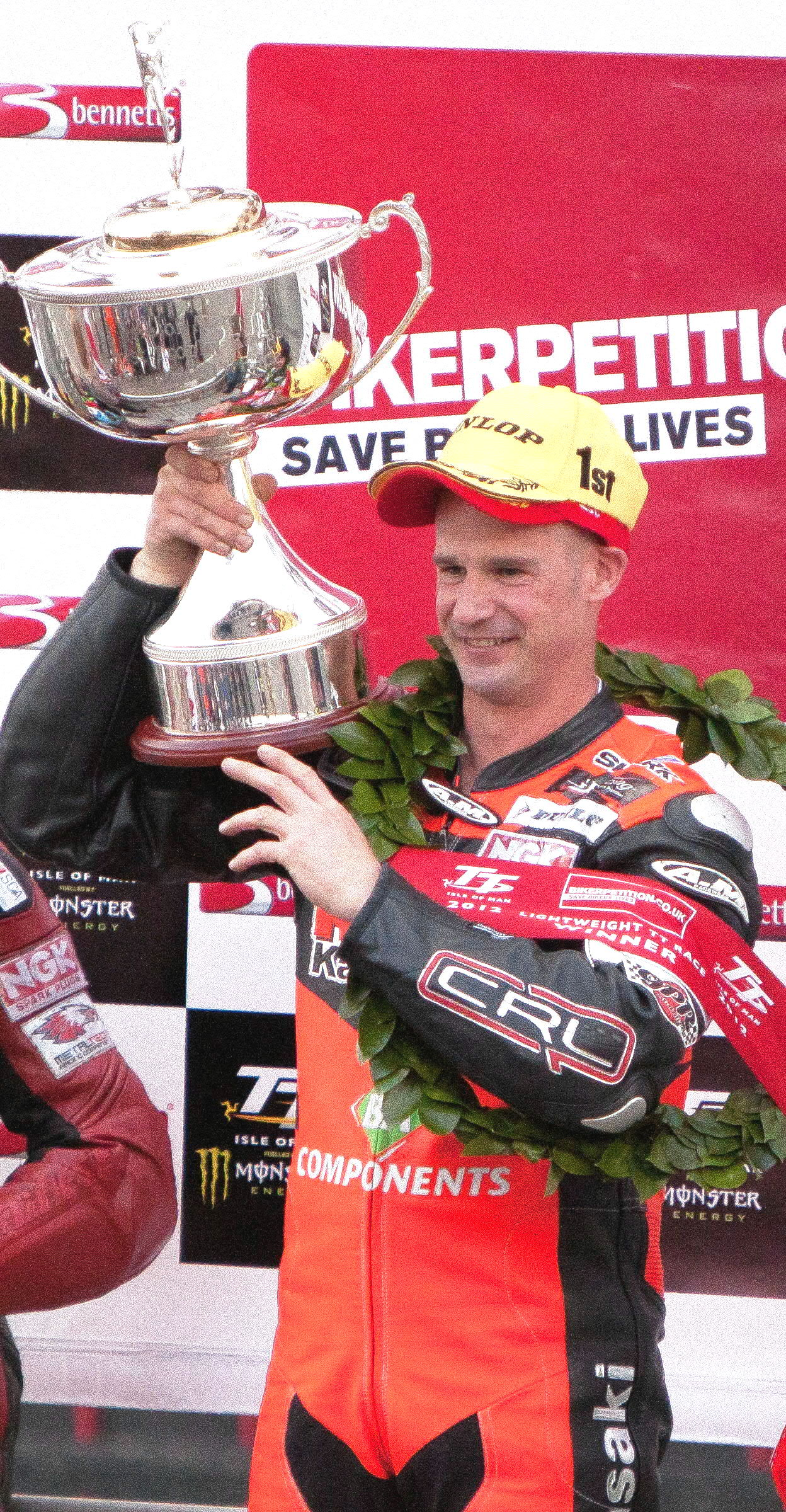
Farquhar at TT podium in 2012

Pos	Name	Total
1	(Northern Ireland) Ryan Farquhar	2031
2	(Northern Ireland) Darran Lindsay	1647
3	(Wales) Ian Lougher	1597
4	(England) John McGuinness	1051
5	(England) Guy Martin	1016
6	(Northern Ireland) Martin Finnegan	952
7	(New Zealand) Bruce Anstey	930
8	(England) Chris Palmer	898
9	(Republic of Ireland) Richard Britton	816
10	(Northern Ireland) Adrian Archibald	606

=== 2003 ===
Pos	Name	Total
1	(Northern Ireland) Ryan Farquhar	1981
2	(Wales) Ian Lougher	1539
3	(Northern Ireland) Adrian Archibald	807
4	(England) Chris Palmer	791
5	(Republic of Ireland) Richard Britton	708
6	(Wales) Jason Griffiths	669
7	(New Zealand) Bruce Anstey	448
8	(Northern Ireland) Martin Finnegan	379
9	(England) John McGuinness	368
10	(Northern Ireland) Robert Dunlop	330

=== 2002 ===
Pos	Name	Total
1	(Wales) Ian Lougher	2652
2	(Northern Ireland) Ryan Farquhar	1464
3	(Northern Ireland) Darran Lindsay	1267
4	(Republic of Ireland) Richard Britton	1097
5	(Northern Ireland) Adrian Archibald	938
6	(Wales) Jason Griffiths	893
7	(England) Chris Palmer	892
8	(Northern Ireland) Gary Jess	760
9	(Northern Ireland) David Jefferies	650
10	(Northern Ireland) Robert Dunlop	460

=== By rider ===
Rank	Riders	Wins	Years
1	(Northern Ireland) Ryan Farquhar	6	2003, 2004, 2008, 2009, 2011, 2012
2	(Wales) Ian Lougher	3	2002, 2005, 2006,
2	(England) Dean Harrison	3	2016, 2017, 2023
3	(Northern Ireland) Michael Dunlop	2	2013, 2025
3	(England) Davey Todd	2	2022, 2024
4	(Isle of Man) Conor Cummins	1	2007
4	(England) James Cowton	1	2014
4	(Northern Ireland) William Dunlop	1	2015
4	(Republic of Ireland) Derek McGee	1	2018
4	(Republic of Ireland) Michael Sweeney	1	2019
