= 2008 Isle of Man TT =

Annual motorcycle racing event

2008 Isle of Man TT Races
- Isle of Man TT Mountain Course layout

Race details
- Date: 24 May – 7 June 2008
- Location: Douglas, Isle of Man
- Course: Isle of Man TT Mountain Course; 37.733 mi / 60.73 km

Senior TT
Pole Position	Fastest Lap
(England) John McGuinness	(England) John McGuinness
128.611 mph	129.517 mph
Podium
1. (England) John McGuinness
2. (Australia) Cameron Donald	3. (England) Ian Hutchinson

Junior TT 600 cc
Pole Position	Fastest Lap
(Northern Ireland) Ryan Farquhar	(England) Steve Plater
122.951 mph	124.127 mph
Podium
1. (England) Steve Plater
2. (England) John McGuinness	3. (England) Keith Amor

Lightweight TT 250 cc
Pole Position	Fastest Lap
	(England) Ian Lougher
	102.321 mph
Podium
1. (Wales) Ian Lougher
2. (Northern Ireland) Ryan Farquhar	3. (England) Chris Palmer

Superstock TT
Pole Position	Fastest Lap
(Northern Ireland) Ryan Farquhar	(Australia) Cameron Donald
126.657 mph	127.544 mph
Podium
1. (Australia) Cameron Donald
2. (England) John McGuinness	3. (England) Guy Martin

2008 Isle of Man TT Festival was held between Saturday 24 May and Saturday 7 June on the 37.733-mile Snaefell Mountain Course and was the 89th Isle of Man TT Race. After the 2007 Centenary TT Races, the 2008 event included a second 600cc Supersport Junior TT race and the re-introduction of two-stroke motor-cycle racing with a Lightweight TT and Ultra-Lightweight TT race on the (4.25 mile) Billown Circuit in the Isle of Man.

For the 2008 Isle of Man TT Races, following the deaths of a race competitor and two spectators at the 26th Milestone during the 2007 Senior TT a number of changes occurred in spectator safety and road widening occurred at Braddan Bridge and a new link road and mini-roundabout at Governor's Bridge. The race organisation changed with the Manx Motor Cycle Club (MMCC) replaced by ACU Events Ltd a subsidiary of the Auto-Cycle Union (ACU). A contract for the official course vehicles was awarded to Audi in a 3-year deal to celebrate the win by the pre-war Audi satellite company DKW by Ewald Kluge in the 1938 Isle of Man TT Races. A further contract was awarded to Yamaha UK to provide motor-cycles and support for the TT Travelling Marshalls. The Isle of Man TT competitor Martin Finnegan was killed while racing at the Tandragee 100 Races on 3 May 2008 and this was followed by the former Isle of Man TT and Manx Grand Prix winner Robert Dunlop who died in an accident on 16 May 2008 at Mather's Cross during practice for the 2008 North West 200 Races.

== TT Practice Week 2008 ==
The first practice session for 2008 Isle of Man TT Races featured an evening untimed session and Newcomers control lap on Saturday 24 May 2008. It was Guy Martin, despite a crash at the 2008 Pre-TT Classic earlier in the day, that dominated the first timed practice session on Monday 26 May 2008 with a lap of 17 minutes and 57.83 seconds an average speed of 126.020 mph on a 1000cc Honda for the Superbike TT race. The 2008 TT Newcomer, James McBride had a high speed crash at Gorse Lea on Monday evening practice suffering leg fractures. The Italian competitor Angelo Conti crashed at the 33rd Milestone and suffered minor injuries. There was a 2-day interlude to practice during Tuesday and Wednesday of practice caused by weather conditions on the Mountain Section of the course. It is announced that the replacement to the injured James McBride would be Michael Dunlop after the recent death of his father Robert Dunlop and his recent win in the 250cc class at the 2008 North West 200 Races had decided to compete at the 2008 Isle of Man TT races after all.

== TT Race Week 2008 ==
=== Superbike TT Race ===
With problems with cancellations due to poor weather on the Snaefell Mountain Course the pole time for the Superbike TT race was set by John McGuinness in 17 minutes, 32.24 seconds an average speed of 129.085 mph. The 6 lap (226.38 miles) Superbike TT Race was scheduled for mid-day start on Saturday 31 May 2008 and the first competitor away from the TT Grandstand was Guy Martin who was delayed by 10 seconds from his designated start-time due to confusion in the pre-stage area. The next competitor, Conor Cummins riding a 1000cc Yamaha with a start interval of 10.00 seconds was delayed by about 4 seconds and John McGuinness at number 3 was delayed by 7 seconds and McGuinness said;- "....still pulling one of my gloves on when I heard Martin's bike going down towards Bray Hill. I screamed at the boys to get the warmers off. I think everyone thought there was a delay. No one had called us forward." The delays were accounted for in the lap-timing, although John McGuinness and 1000cc Honda was sidelined with an electrical mis-fire and pulled-in at Glen Helen on lap 2 and Guy Martin retired on lap 4 at Sulby with an oil-leak to his Honda motor-cycle.

The early lead was held by Ian Hutchinson at Glen Helen on lap 1 riding a 1000cc Yamaha and only 8 seconds covered the top 12 competitors. Despite the delayed start, Guy Martin stormed to the lead by Parliament Square in Ramsey on lap1 by 0.43 seconds from John McGuinness with the Australian Cameron Donald riding a 1000cc Suzuki in 3rd place. Despite the delay and the standing-start, Guy Martin set a new lap record for the Superbike TT in 17 minutes and 32.09 seconds an average speed of 129.103 and led John McGuinness by 3.98 seconds and Cameron Donald by 6.75 seconds in 3rd place on corrected time on lap 1. The old lap record was broken by McGuinness on lap 1 at an average speed of 128.617 mph, although was reported touring at Laurel Bank on lap 2 retiring at Glen Helen and McGuinness explained that;- "....The Bike suffered a slight misfire at the top of the Mountain. It got progressively worse after that and I could't continue after Ballacraine." After the retirement of John McGuinness, the lead was extended by Guy Martin to 8.9 seconds over Cameron Donald in 2nd place and his New Zealand teammate Bruce Anstey in 3rd place. Another new lap record was established by Guy Martin for the Superbike TT on lap 2 at an average speed of 129.540 mph and after the pit-stop at the TT Grandstand led Cameron Donald by 14 seconds.

The lead was reduced to 10.21 seconds by Ramsey Hairpin by Cameron Donald on lap 3 and fellow Suzuki rider Adrian Archibald replaced Ryan Farquhar in 4th place. The Yamaha motor-cycle of Ian Hutchinson suffered an oil-leak at Union Mills forcing him to retire from the race. With the retirement of Guy Martin at Sulby Village on lap 4, also with an oil leak, the 2008 Superbike TT Race became the " Down under Dice " with Suzuki teammates Cameron Donald and Bruce Anstey increased their pace to produce laps at an average speed of 128.558 mph and 128.601 mph respectively. On the last lap, Bruce Anstey tried to increase his pace to wrestle the lead from his Suzuki teammate, "I tried to pull away in the last-lap, but could't manage it so I let Cameron back in front again and just followed him home." The 2008 Superbike TT was won by Cameron Donald in 1hour, 47 minutes and 5.89 seconds to set a new race record at an average race speed 126.82 mph and become the first Australian winner of an Isle of Man TT race since Graeme McGreggor won the 1984 Junior TT and Formula 2 TT races. In second place was Bruce Anstey at an average race speed of 126.826 mph. In 3rd place, Adrian Archibald also riding a 1000cc Suzuki motor-cycle at an average race speed of 126.826 mph to produce a Suzuki 1-2-3 win at the 2008 Superbike TT Race. Run in warm weather and the winner Cameron Donald mentioned;- "It was hot out there. The tar was melting in place."

=== Sidecar TT Race 'A' ===
The 3 lap (113.00 miles) Sidecar TT Race 'A' was run in the same warm weather conditions as the Superbike TT Race. It was the 600c LCR Honda outfit of Nick Crowe/ Mark Cox that had dominated practice with a fastest time of 19 minutes, 35.66 seconds an average speed of 115.534 set on Friday evening practice. The first competitor away from the TT Grandstand was the 600cc DMR Suzuki sidecar outfit of Dave Molyneux/Dan Sayle that immediately retired at the end of the pit-lane with clutch problems. The 600cc LCR Suzuki of John Holden/Andrew Winkle led the Sidecar TT Race 'A' at Glen Helen by 1.86 seconds on lap 1 from the LCR outfit of Nick Crowe/ Mark Cox with the 600cc LCR Honda of Klaus Klaffenbock/Christian Parzer in third place a further 3.36 seconds behind the leaders. At Ballaugh Bridge on the first lap, John Holden/Andrew Winkle had extended their lead to 3.5 seconds and to 6 seconds by Ramsey Hairpin over Nick Crowe/Mark Cox. The 600cc LCR Honda sidecar of Klaus Klaffenbock/Christian Parzer retired just before Parliament Square in Ramsey and the 600cc Yamaha of Steve Norbury/Rick Long now moved into 3rd place and the 600cc Suzuki of Simon Neary/Jamie Winn into 4th place. As Nick Crowe/Mark Cox increased their race pace, the lead of John Holden/Andrew Winkle fell from 5.3 seconds at the Bungalow to 3.1 seconds at the end of lap 1 at the TT Grandstand.

At Glen Helen on lap 2, the lead for John Holden/Andrew Winkle was now reduced to 0.19 seconds. Due to the increasing race speed of Nick Crowe/Mark Crowe and problems experienced by John Holden/Andrew Winkle with a failing rear shock absorber they slipped 4.19 seconds behind the new leaders of Crowe/Cox at Ramsey Hairpin on lap 2. The Yamaha sidecar of Steve Norbury/Rick Long retired at Handley's Corner on lap 2 allowing Simon Neary/Jamie Winn to claim 3rd place and to lead the 600cc LCR Suzuki of Tim Reeves/Patrick Farrance by just 0.23 seconds in 4th place. A lap of 19 minutes, 40.43 seconds an average race speed of 115.066 mph on lap 2 by Nick Crowe/Mark Cox was the fastest of the race and now led John Holden/Andrew Winkle by 9.8 seconds. This lead increased to 12 seconds by Glen Helen on lap 3 for Crowe/Cox and the Yamaha sidecar of Simon Neary/Jamie Winn retired at Union Mills allowing TT newcomer Tim Reeves/Patrick Farrance into 3rd place. On the final climb of the Mountain Section, Nick Crowe/Mark Cox extended their lead to 16.49 seconds to win Sidecar TT Race 'A' in 59 minutes and 22.80 seconds at an average race speed of 114.372 mph from John Holden/Andrew Winkle in 2nd place at an average race speed of 113.751 mph and the former World Sidecar Champion Tim Reeves/Patrick Farrance in 3rd place at an average race speed of 111.096 mph. Despite the fast race pace, Nick Crowe commented that;- "The bike did not feel very fast today....It wouldn't pull top gear properly. I may have overgeared it, but perhaps it was the heat.". The 3rd place for Tim Reeves was the first podium place for a sidecar driver as a TT newcomer since Rolf Biland and Ken Williams finished 2nd in the 1977 Sidecar Race 'B.' In respect to his decision to enter the Isle of Man TT Races, Tim Reeves had some harsh comments;- "I had some many doubters. So many said I wouldn't cut it here so this has just pi**ed in their Corn Flakes."

=== Superstock TT Race ===
The first race on Monday 2 June 2008 was the 4 lap (150.92 miles) Superstock TT Race for 1000cc motor-cycles conforming to the 2008 MCRCB Superstock Regulations. The practice leaderboard for the Superstock TT Race was headed by Ryan Farquhar riding a 1000cc Kawasaki motor-cycle with a time of 17 minutes and 52.41 seconds an average speed of 126.657 mph set on Thursday evening practice. With low mist on the Mountain Section course the 2008 Superstock TT Race went ahead without a delay in the start-time and race officials cleared the grid at the 2-minute race-start signal to prevent the problems that occurred at the start of the Superbike TT Race. At Glen Helen in mixed road conditions on lap 1, the 1000cc Honda motor-cycle of John McGuinness led Gary Johnson with a race number 16 and a start interval of 2 minutes 30 seconds, by 2.3 seconds from the Suzuki of Bruce Anstey in 3rd place. By the time that McGuinness arrived at Ramsey Hairpin on lap 1 the other competitors had increased their race pace and he now only led by 0.16 seconds from the Suzuki of Cameron Donald. With further damp patches between Ramsey Hairpin and the Water Works Corner and mixed weather including mist on the Mountain Section, it was Cameron Donald that seized the initiative and now led McGuinness at the Bungalow by a narrow margin of 1.10 seconds. The first lap was completed in 17 minutes and 53.12 seconds an average speed of 126.573 mph by Cameron Donald to lead John McGuinness by 1.75 seconds in 2nd place, the Kawasaki of Ryan Farquhar in 3rd place and the Honda of Gary Johnson relegated to 4th place.

Although Guy Martin riding a Honda completed lap 1 in 6th place with a lap of 125.090 mph, he increased his race speed during lap 2 to 126.926 mph to move into 3rd place on the Mountain Section pushing the Yamaha of Conor Cummins into 3rd place. Race leader, Cameron Donald produced the fastest lap of the 2008 Supersport race in 17 minutes and 44.5 seconds an average speed of 127.544 mph. A delay caused by an overflow of petrol for McGuinness during refuelling at a pit-stop at the end of lap 2 increased the lead for Cameron Donald to 8 seconds. Problems with a fuel-cap lost 5 seconds for Conor Cummins in pit-lane and allowed Ryan Farquhar to claim 4th place. The winner of the 2007 Superstock race, Bruce Anstey retired on lap 2 at the TT Grandstand after suffering with the effects of flu, while both Keith Amor and Gary Johnson retired at Governor's Bridge after running-out of petrol. On lap 3, Cameron Donald increased the lead to 17.5 seconds, although on lap 4 McGuinness lapped at a speed of 126.619 mph to reduce the margin to 15.07 seconds on the last lap and Cameron Donald riding for Suzuki won the 2008 Superstock TT race in 1hour, 11 minutes and 59.69 seconds an average race speed of 125.776. After missing the 2007 Centenary TT races through injury, Cameron Donald celebrated a double-win and said the race was won due to the weather conditions;- "...I was a bit surprised about the fog on the mountain....Then I thought there is no traffic coming the other way and no kangaroos, so I put my head down and went for it."

=== Supersport Junior TT Race 1 ===
Held in improving weather conditions the second race of the day was the 4 lap (150.92 mph) Junior TT race 1 for 600cc motor-cycles conforming to the 2008 MCRCB Supersport Regulations. The practice leaderboard for the Junior TT Race was headed by Ryan Farquhar riding a 600cc Kawasaki motor-cycle with a time of 18 minutes and 25.06 seconds an average speed of 122.915 mph set on Friday evening practice. The first competitor away from the TT Grandstand was the 600cc Honda of Guy Martin who retired on lap 1 at the Highlander. The pre-race favourite, the 600cc Suzuki of Bruce Anstey led at Glen Helen by 1.7 seconds from the 600cc Yamaha of Ian Hutchinson and John McGuinness riding a Honda in 3rd place. After reaching the official timing point at Ballaugh Bridge on lap 1, Bruce Anstey now led by 6 seconds from McGuinness in 2nd place. The lead increased to 9.32 seconds by Ramsey Hairpin on lap 1 and the places behind the leader Anstey continued to change as Ryan Farquhar moved into 3rd place only 0.3 seconds behind McGuinness. On the mountain section of the course the 600cc Honda of Keith Amor passed McGuinness for second place and Bruce Anstey completed lap 1 in 18 minutes and 9.04 seconds at an average speed of 124.723 mph to lead by 11.76 seconds. While Anstey continued to increase his lead to 15.2 seconds on lap 2 at Glen Helen, Keith Amor in 2nd place had only managed to marginally increase his lead over McGuinness from 1.19 to 1.3 seconds. At the Ramsey Hairpin on lap 2, Bruce Anstey led on the road and on corrected race-time by 23 seconds from Keith Amor and John McGuinness, Ian Hutchinson passed Farquhar for 4th place only to retire at Sulby on lap 3.

A lap of 123.600 mph on lap 3 by Steve Plater riding a 600cc Yamaha, passed Ian Lougher and Conor Cummins to claim 5th place. The fast race pace was continued by Bruce Anstey, completing lap 2 in 18 minutes and 3.40 seconds an average speed of 125.372 and breaking the lap record previously held by Guy Martin for the Junior TT by 1.63 seconds. At the pit-stop at the end of lap 2, Bruce Anstey led by 24.82 seconds from McGuinness who had regained 2nd place with a slender lead of 0.08 second of Keith Amor. A much faster pit-stop by McGuinness reduced the lead of Bruce Anstey by 5 seconds, although this advantage was reduced by Ballaugh Bridge on lap 3 and Anstey's lead was now back to 21 seconds. Another lap of 119.040 mph on lap 3 by Steve Plater elevated him to 4th place, passing the Kawasaki of Ryan Farquhar. This was followed by another lap of 124.363 mph by Steve Plater on lap 4, passing Keith Amor at Glen Helen on corrected time for 3rd place and only 9 seconds behind McGuinness in 2nd place reducing the gap between Plater and McGuinness to 5 seconds at Ramsey Hairpin on the last lap. The Mountain Section again proved to be conclusive as Steve Plater passed McGuinness to claim 2nd place on corrected time by 0.87 seconds at the finish-line and 21.27 seconds behind the 1st place of Bruce Anstey with an average race speed of 122.927 mph. A post-race technical inspection of the 600cc Suzuki of Bruce Anstey discovered an oversized exhaust-cam lifter at 8.75 mm as the Supersport regulations define a maximum limit of 8.00 mm. The TT race organiser accepted that a mistake by the race engine builder caused by a mis-labelled exhaust cam part resulted in the breach of the race homologation rules and the subsequent disqualification of the 600cc Suzuki of Bruce Anstey from first place. The revised result for the 2008 Supersport TT Race 1 elevated Steve Plater riding a 600cc Yamaha to 1st place in a race time of 1 hour, 14 minutes and 1.07 seconds at an average race speed of 122.338 mph. After his achievement to claim second place and then elevated to winner, Steve Plater said that;- "I can't believe it. It's been a rollercoaster of emotions for me....My head is a big snowball. I need to let it sink in for a while."

=== Supersport Junior TT Race 2 ===
The 4 lap (150.92 mph) Junior TT race 2 held on Wednesday 4 June 2008 was run in the shadow of the exclusion of Bruce Anstey for a technical infringement from Mondays Supersport race 1. Determined to make amends and again race favourite for Supersport race 2, Bruce Anstey found that it was the 600cc Yamaha of Ian Hutchinson that led by 0.4 second at Glen Helen on lap 1. This was increased to 1.0 seconds at Ballaugh Bridge and Ian Hutchinson led the 600cc Hondas of John McGuinness and Guy Martin in 3rd place. As the official timing-point at Ramsey Hairpin was reached on lap 1, the 600cc Suzuki of Bruce Anstey now led by 0.41 second from Ian Hutchinson and Guy Martin. The 600cc Kawasaki of Ryan Farquhar was now in 4th place and was timed on the Sulby Straight at 172.50 mph as the 600cc Honda of John McGuinness slowed with an oil-leak and eventually retired at the end of the first lap. The winner of Mondays Superport race, Steve Plater retired his 600cc Yamaha at the Bungalow along with the 600cc Honda of Keith Amor on lap 1 after he had experienced a small fire on the descent down Bray Hill after a lead from the wiring-loom worked loose and melted on the carbon-fibre bodywork. It was Ian Hutchinson that produced a lap of 18 minutes and 13.09 seconds an average speed of 124.261 mph to lead Bruce Anstey by 0.83 seconds at the TT Grandstand on lap 1. As the pace increased, Bruce Anstey lapped in a new record time of 18 minutes and 3.51 seconds an average speed of 125.359 to lead Ian Hutchinson by 7.96 seconds. At the pits stops at the end of lap 2, Matts Nilsson was awarded a 5-second penalty for over-shooting the stop-box. At the Mountain Box on lap 3, Cameron Donald retired with mechanical problems as his teammate, Bruce Anstey continued to dominate the remainder of the Supersport Race to win in 1 hour, 13 minutes and 35.71 seconds at an average race speed of 123.041 mph. An obviously relieved Anstey said; -"I wanted to put Monday behind me. The bike felt better than it did on Monday. If it had not been so windy on the Mountain Mile I could have gone faster and perhaps broken the race record."

=== Sidecar TT Race 'B' ===
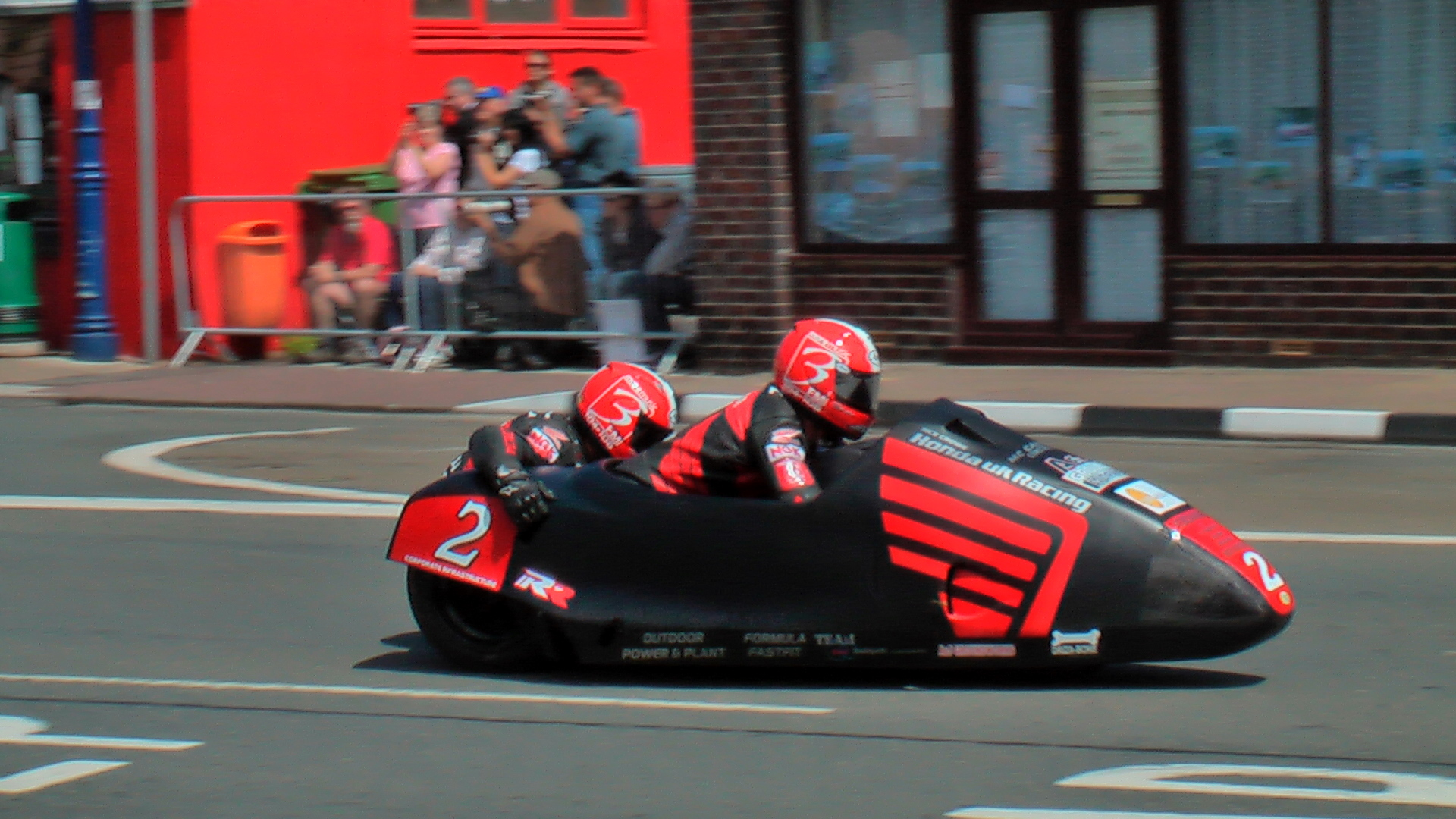
Sidecar TT Race 'B' winners, Nick Crowe and Mark Cox

The 3 lap (113.00 miles) Sidecar TT Race 'B' it was again the 600c LCR Honda outfit of Nick Crowe/ Mark Cox that had dominated the race and led the 600cc LCR Suzuki of John Holden/Andrew Winkle by 2.4 seconds at Glen Helen on lap 1 and the DMR 600cc Suzuki of Dave Molyneux/Dan Sayle in 3rd place. At Ballaugh Bridge the sidecar outfit of Dave Molyneux/Dan Sayle passed Holden/Winkle on corrected race time and were a full 5 seconds behind the leading sidecar crew of Nick Crowe/ Mark Cox. As the leaders approached the official timing at the Bungalow, the LCR outfit of Nick Crowe/Mark Cox had almost made-up the 10 second road starting difference completing lap 1 in 19 minutes and 48.35 seconds an average speed of 114.300 mph with a lead of 8.95 seconds. Passing Molyneux/Dan Sayle on the road at Braddan Bridge the lead for Nick Crowe/Mark Cox was 10.47 seconds ahead on lap 2 at Glen Helen. The 600cc Suzuki outfit of Kenny Howles/Doug Jewell crashed at the 11th Milestone on lap 2 and the sidecar crew were air-lifted to Nobles Hospital. The 600cc DMR Suzuki of Roy Hanks/Dave Wells retired at the Windy Corner on the same lap. The 2nd place crew of Dave Molyneux/Dan Sayle made a number of attempts to try to pass the leaders on lap 2 & 3 and Nick Crowe/Mark Cox won the Sidecar TT Race 'B' in 59 minutes and 34.76 seconds an average race speed of 112.989 mph. The winner Nick Crowe said the close racing with Dave Molyneux that;- "....you could not have put a cigarette paper between us at times – in fact I'sure we did touch fairings in places."

=== Senior TT Race ===
The Blue Riband event of TT Race week was the Senior TT race over 6 lap (226.38 miles) of the Snaefell Mountain Course held on Friday 6 June 2008. A parade lap for Ducati racing motor-cycles held before the start of the Senior TT included former World Superbike Champion and TT race winner Carl Fogarty along with Trevor Nation, Frank Rutter and Michael Rutter. The former 1950s TT competitor Sammy Miller crashed a twin-cylinder 1978 Ducati 900SS motor-cycle at the Water Works Corner during the parade lap and was unhurt.

The 12 noon start for the much anticipated Senior TT was expected to be a battle between the 2008 double TT winner Cameron Donald and his Suzuki teammate Bruce Anstey after claiming his 7th TT win a couple of days earlier to equal the number of wins of former TT competitor Mick Grant. The first competitor away from the TT Grandstand was the 1000cc Honda of Guy Martin. The local Isle of Man TT rider, Conor Cummins retired at the 2nd Milestone on lap 1 near Union Mills after his 1000cc Yamaha suffered an oil-leak. At Glen Helen on lap 1, despite also having a suspected oil-leak the 1000cc Honda of John McGuinness led by 0.4 seconds from the 1000cc Yamaha of Ian Hutchinson and the 1000cc Suzuki of Bruce Anstey in 3rd place. As the leaders of the Senior TT reached the official timing-point in Ramsey on lap 1, the Honda of McGuinness now led Bruce Anstey by 0.15 seconds and his Suzuki teammate Cameron Donald in 3rd place, followed by Guy Martin and Ian Hutchinson slipping to 5th place. A lap of 128.631 mph by Bruce Anstey from a standing start gave him a lead of 1.98 seconds over john McGuinness at the end of lap 1, increasing his lead to 2.5 seconds at Ballaugh Bridge on lap 2 and then to 4.5 seconds at the Bungalow on fast Mountain Section of the course and recording another lap at an average speed of 129.445 mph.

The lap 2 pit-stops proved to be dramatic as Bruce Anstey promptly retired with a slipping-clutch and Guy Martin retired at the Quarterbridge after his pit-stop with a failed alternator. This left John McGuinness with a 4-second lead over the Suzuki of Cameron Donald on lap 3 and a 34-second lead over Ian Hutchinson in 3rd place. As the pace of the Senior TT race increased, the lead that McGuinness held fell to 2.0 seconds at Ballaugh Bridge on lap 3 to a lead of 0.1 seconds at the Ramsey Hairpin over Cameron Donald. At the start of lap 4, John McGuinness held onto a lead of 0.78 seconds at the TT Grandstand which he held until Ramsey on the same lap. The run over the Mountain Section proved to be crucial as with Bruce Anstey on lap 1 his Suzuki teammate, Cameron Donald claiming a lead of 3.1 seconds over the Honda of John McGuinness at the official timing-point at the Bungalow. A lap of 129.231 mph by Cameron Donald gave him a health lead going into the second pit-stop at the end of lap 4. Despite, John McGuinness having a slightly faster pit-stop he remained in 2nd place and the deficit was increased to 4.12 seconds at Glen Helen on lap 5 and by Ramsey this had increased to 6.74 seconds. As the Australian, Cameron Donald was on course for a prestigious hat-trick of TT wins on the last lap of the Senior TT the 6.74 second lead at the TT Grandstand fell dramatically to a 9.27 second deficit as the Honda of John McGuinness became the new leader at Glen Helen on lap 6. As Cameron Donald slowed his pace with an oil-leak from a split crankcase on the last lap, John McGuinness produced the fastest lap of the race in 17 minutes and 28.54 seconds an average speed of 129.517 mph which was only 6.73 seconds slower than the 130.354 mph outright record set during the 2007 Centenary TT Races. After 6 laps of the Snaefell Mountain Course, John McGuinness won the 2008 Senior TT race in 1 hour, 46 minutes and 47.69 seconds at an average race speed of 127.186 mph, the most dramatic Senior TT race since 1992 when Steve Hislop won the Senior TT after beating Carl Fogarty. After claiming his 14th Isle of Man TT win and equalling the record of Mike Hailwood, in the winners enclosure John McGuinness said that;- "It was the closest big-bike TT race I have been in....I was relieved to hear the British National anthem as I was getting tried of listening to the New Zealand and Australian ones."

=== National Road Race Meeting 2008 ===
The National Road Race Meeting, now the traditional final event of the Isle of Man TT Festival and was the venue for the re-introduction of two-stroke motor-cycle racing with a Lightweight TT and Ultra-Lightweight TT race on the Billown Circuit on Saturday 7 June 2008. Held in almost perfect weather and evening sunshine, the first race was the 12 lap (51.00 miles) 125cc Ultra-Lightweight TT race on the 4.25-mile Billown Circuit in Castletown. The leader from the start was the 125cc Honda of Chris Palmer leading by 3 seconds from Ian Lougher on lap 1, increasing his lead to 12 seconds over Lougher by lap 4. Despite being only in 7th place on lap 1 at Ballabeg Hairpin, Dan Sayle changing from a sidecar TT passenger to the solo class moved up to 3rd place by lap 3. With only 2 laps remaining, Chris Palmer led Ian Lougher by 20 seconds only for Lougher to have his chain break of his 125cc Honda on the exit of Castletown Corner. The 2008 Lightweight TT Race was won by Chris Palmer in 32 minutes and 32.309 seconds at an average race speed of 94.042 mph from Dan Sayle and Nigel Moore in 3rd place. After the TT Race debut at the Billown Circuit, Chris Palmer was delighted with his win and said;- "That last lap was a very long way, indeed 12 laps of this course is a heck of a distance for the little two-strokes as there is so much accelerating, braking and clutch-slipping. It is also pretty demanding as a rider. I reckon 12 laps of this course is harder than four laps of the Mountain."

The 2nd race of the Billown TT was the 12 lap (51.00 miles) 250cc Lightweight TT race and was closely contested event with Chris Palmer the race 1 winner grabbing the holeshot down to Ballakeighen Corner and to lead lap 1. The leader for the next 2 laps was Ian Lougher from Ryan Farquhar, Michael Dunlop and Chris Palmer in 4th place. By lap 4, Michael Dunlop claimed the lead from Ryan Farquhar who later led lap 6 by 0.1 second from Ian Lougher and Michael Dunlop. A broken crankshaft ended Michael Dunlop's race at Ballabeg Hairpin on lap 9, while Ian Lougher edged away from the opposition in the remaining laps to win the 2008 Lightweight TT Race in 30 minutes and 22.495 seconds at an average race speed of 100.741 mph. In 2nd place was Ryan Farquhar who finished the 2008 National Road Meeting with a win on a 1000cc Kawasaki in the 9 lap (38.25 miles) support race in 21 minutes and 39.200 seconds at an average race speed of 105.988 mph.

== Results ==
=== Practice Times ===
==== Superbike/Senior TT Leaderboard and Practice Times ====
Rank	Rider	Mon 26 May	Tues 27 May	Wed 28 May	Thurs 29 May	Fri 30 May
1	(England) John McGuinness; 1000cc Honda	17' 58.34; 125.960 mph	– No Time	Cancelled; No Time	17' 52.08; 126.696 mph	17' 36.11; 128.611 mph
2	(Australia) Cameron Donald; 1000cc Suzuki	17' 59.53; 125.882 mph	– No Time	Cancelled; No Time	17' 57.37; 126.074 mph	17' 37.45; 128.448 mph
3	(New Zealand) Bruce Anstey; 1000cc Suzuki	17' 59.97; 125.771 mph	– No Time	Cancelled; No Time	17' 53.97; 126.472 mph	17' 46.65; 127.820 mph
4	(England) Guy Martin; 1000cc Honda	17' 57.83; 126.020 mph	– No Time	Cancelled; No Time	17' 48.84; 127.080 mph	17' 43.07; 127.770 mph
5	(England) Ian Hutchinson; 1000cc Yamaha	– No Time	– No Time	Cancelled; No Time	17' 55.45; 126.299 mph	17' 49.86; 126.959 mph
6	(Northern Ireland) Ryan Farquhar; 1000cc Kawasaki	18' 03.62; 125.346 mph	– No Time	Cancelled; No Time	17' 52.41; 126.657 mph	18' 30.87; 122.272 mph
7	(Northern Ireland) Adrian Archibald; 1000cc Suzuki	17' 59.14; 125.867 mph	– No Time	Cancelled; No Time	18' 05.78; 125.097 mph	17' 15.11; 126.339 mph
8	(England) Gary Johnson; 1000cc Honda	18' 23.88; 123.046 mph	– No Time	Cancelled; No Time	18' 10.13; 124.598 mph	18' 01.35; 125.610 mph
9	(Isle of Man) Conor Cummins; 1000cc Suzuki	18' 58.95; 119.257 mph	– No Time	Cancelled; No Time	18' 15.53; 123.984 mph	18' 02.83; 125.438 mph
10	(England) Daniel Stewart; 1000cc Honda	18' 20.86; 123.383 mph	– No Time	Cancelled; No Time	18' 13.58; 121.974 mph	18' 08.48; 124.795 mph
11	(Scotland) Keith Amor; 1000cc Honda	18' 23.61; 123.076 mph	– No Time	Cancelled; No Time	18' 44.74; 120.671 mph	18' 11.96; 124.389 mph
12	(Scotland) Les Shand; 1000cc Yamaha	18' 39.11; 121.371 mph	– No Time	Cancelled; No Time	18' 44.93; 120.744 mph	18' 13.20; 124.248 mph
13	(Wales) Ian Lougher; 1000cc Yamaha	18' 23.76; 123.059 mph	– No Time	Cancelled; No Time	18' 13.47; 124.218 mph	18' 15.32; 124.007 mph
14	(England) Carl Rennie; 1000cc Honda	18' 29.62; 122.410 mph	– No Time	Cancelled; No Time	17' 23.68; 123.069 mph	– No Time
15	(England) Mark Parrett; 1000cc Yamaha	– No Time	– No Time	Cancelled; No Time	18' 48.57; 120.354 mph	18' 28.27; 122.599 mph
16	(England) James McBride; 1000cc Yamaha	18' 30.16; 122.349 mph	– No Time	Cancelled; No Time	– No Time	– No Time
17	(Isle of Man) Gary Carswell; 1000cc Suzuki	18' 58.45; 119.309 mph	– No Time	Cancelled; No Time	19' 01.89; 118.950 mph	18' 35.00; 121.819 mph
18	(England) Paul Owen; 1000cc Kawasaki	18' 52.63; 119.992 mph	– No Time	Cancelled; No Time	18' 58.17; 119.339 mph	18' 39.73; 121.304 mph
19	(Northern Ireland) John Burrows; 1000cc Honda	19' 02.890; 118.847 mph	– No Time	Cancelled; No Time	18' 55.69; 119.600 mph	18' 43.93; 120.851 mph
20	(England) Ian Pattinson; 1000cc Yamaha	18' 48.93; 120.361 mph	– No Time	Cancelled; No Time	18' 47.97; 120.419 mph	18' 43.93; 120.737 mph

==== Sidecar TT ====
Rank	Rider	Mon 26 May
1	(Isle of Man) Nick Crowe/Mark Cox; LCR Honda 600cc	20' 03.61; 112.851 mph
2	(England) John Holden/Andrew Winkle; LCR Suzuki 600cc	20' 16.94; 111.614 mph
3	(Austria) Klaus Klaffenböck/Christian Parzer; LCR Honda 600cc	20' 44.56; 109.137 mph
4	(England) Simon Neary/Jamie Winn; 600cc Suzuki	20' 48.06; 108.831 mph
5	(England) Phil Dongworth/Stuart Castles; 600cc Ireson Honda	20' 57.07; 108.054 mph
6	(Isle of Man) Dave Molyneux/Dan Sayle; DMR Suzuki 600cc	21' 03.22; 107.526 mph
7	(England) Conard Harrison/Kerry Williams; Honda 600cc	21' 14.82; 106.546 mph
8	(England) Greg Lambert/Sally Wilson; DMR Suzuki 600cc	21' 28.25; 105.436 mph
9	(England) Nigel Connole/Dipash Chauhan; LCR Honda 600cc	21' 32.11; 105.121 mph
10	(England) Andy Laidlow/Martin Hull; LCR Suzuki 600cc	21' 38.38; 104.172 mph
11	(England) Gary Bryan/Robert Bell; Yamaha 600cc	21' 43.99; 103.718 mph
12	(England) Tim Reeves/Patrick Farrance; LCR Suzuki 600cc	21' 49.59; 103.718 mph

=== Race results ===
==== 2008 Superbike TT final standings. ====
31 May 2008 6 Laps (236.38 Miles) Mountain Course.

Rank	Rider	Team	Speed	Time
1	(Australia) Cameron Donald	Suzuki GSXR 1000cc	126.826 mph	1:47.16.66
2	(New Zealand) Bruce Anstey	Suzuki GSXR 1000cc	126.614 mph	1:48.16.66
3	(Northern Ireland) Adrian Archibald	Suzuki GSXR 1000cc	125.034 mph	1:49.37.97
4	(England) Gary Johnson	Honda Fireblade 1000cc	124.372 mph	1:49.12.67
5	(Wales) Ian Lougher	Yamaha R1 1000cc	124.018 mph	1:49.31.38
6	(Northern Ireland) Ryan Farquhar	Kawasaki ZX10-R 1000cc	123.936 mph	1:49.35.70
7	(Scotland) Keith Amor	Honda Fireblade 1000cc	122.838 mph	1:50.34.50
8	(England) Daniel Stewart	Honda CBR 1000cc	122.815 mph	1:50.35.73
9	(England) Carl Rennie	Suzuki GSXR 1000cc	122.423 mph	1:50.57.00
10	(England) Steve Plater	Yamaha R1 1000cc	122.233 mph	1:51.07.34

Fastest Lap and New Lap Record: Guy Martin – 129.540 mph (17'28.54) on lap 2.

==== 2008 Sidecar TT Race 'A' TT final standings ====
31 May 2008 3 Laps (113.00 Miles) Mountain Course.

Rank	Rider	Team	Speed	Time
1	(Isle of Man) Nick Crowe/ Mark Cox	LCR Honda 600cc	114.372 mph	59' 22.80
2	(England) John Holden/Andrew Winkle	LCR Suzuki 600cc	113.751 mph	59' 42.24
3	(England) Tim Reeves/Patrick Farrance	LCR Suzuki 600cc	111.096 mph	1:01.07.84
4	(England) Phil Dongworth/Stuart Castles	Ireson Honda 600cc	111.011 mph	1:01.10.68
5	(England) Nigel Connole/Dipash Chauhan	LCR Honda 600cc	109.926 mph	1:01.46.90
6	(England) Douglas Wright/Stuart Bond	Honda 600cc	109.817 mph	1:01.50.57
7	(England) Gary Bryan/Robert Bell	Yamaha 600cc	108.347 mph	1:02.36.68
8	(England) Tony Elmer/Darren Marshall	Ireson Yamaha 600cc	108.347 mph	1:02.40.93
9	(England) Roy Hanks/Dave Wells	DMR Suzuki 600cc	108.141 mph	1:02.48.08
10	(England) Greg Lambert/Sally Wilson	DMR Honda 600cc	107.954 mph	1:02.54.60

Fastest Lap: Nick Crowe and Mark Cox – 115.066 mph (19'40.43) on lap 2.

==== 2008 Superstock TT final standings. ====
2 June 2008 4 Laps (150.73 Miles) Mountain Course.

Rank	Rider	Team	Speed	Time
1	(Australia) Cameron Donald	Suzuki GSXR 1000cc	125.776 mph	1:11.59.68
2	(England) John McGuinness	Honda 1000cc	125.338 mph	1:12.14.76
3	(England) Guy Martin	Honda 1000cc	125.253 mph	1:12.17.71
4	(Northern Ireland) Ryan Farquhar	Kawasaki ZX10 1000cc	124.776 mph	1:13.34.98
5	(Isle of Man) Conor Cummins	Yamaha R1 1000cc	124.605 mph	1:12.40.28
6	(Northern Ireland) Adrian Archibald	Suzuki GSXR 1000cc	123.596 mph	1:13.15.87
7	(Wales) Ian Lougher	Yamaha R1 1000cc	123.103 mph	1:13.33.48
8	(England) Steve Plater	Yamaha R1 1000cc	122.897 mph	1:13.40.87
9	(England) Carl Rennie	Suzuki GSXR 1000cc	122.732 mph	1:13.46.81
10	(England) Daniel Stewart	Yamaha R1	120.001 mph	1:14.13.33

Fastest Lap: Cameron Donald – 127.544 mph (17'44.95) on lap 2.

==== 2008 Supersport Junior TT Race 1 (Revised Result) ====
2 June 2008 4 Laps (150.73 Miles) Mountain Course.

Rank	Rider	Team	Speed	Time
1	(England) Steve Plater	Yamaha R6 600cc	122.338 mph	1:14.01.07
2	(England) John McGuinness	Honda 600cc	122.245 mph	1:14.04.46
3	(Scotland) Keith Amor	Honda CBR 600cc	122.030 mph	1:14.12.28
4	(Northern Ireland) Ryan Farquhar	Kawasaki ZX6 600cc	121.976 mph	1:14.14.26
5	(Wales) Ian Lougher	Yamaha R6 600cc	121.942 mph	1:14.15.50
6	(England) Gary Johnson	Honda CBR 600cc	120.981 mph	1:14.15.89
7	(England) Mark Parrett	Yamaha R6 600cc	120.020 mph	1:15.26.86
8	(Sweden) Mats Nilsson	Honda 600cc	119.879 mph	1:15.32.36
9	(Australia) Cameron Donald	Suzuki GSXR 600cc	119.853 mph	1:15.33.15
10	(Northern Ireland) Michael Dunlop	Yamaha R6 600cc	119.850 mph	1:15.33.26

Fastest Lap: Steve Plater – 124.127 mph (18'12.19) on lap 4.

==== 2008 Supersport Junior TT Race 2 result ====
4 June 2008 4 Laps (150.73 Miles) Mountain Course.

Rank	Rider	Team	Speed	Time
1	(New Zealand) Bruce Anstey	Suzuki GSXR 600cc	123.041 mph	1:13.35.71
2	(England) Ian Hutchinson	Honda 600cc	122.099 mph	1:14.09.76
3	(Northern Ireland) Ryan Farquhar	Kawasaki ZX6 600cc	121.733 mph	1:14.23.14
4	(Wales) Ian Lougher	Yamaha R6 600cc	121.258 mph	1:14.40.63
5	(England) Gary Johnson	Honda CBR 600cc	121.138 mph	1:14.45.05
6	(England) Guy Martin	Honda 600cc	120.958 mph	1:14.51.73
7	(Isle of Man) Conor Cummins	Yamaha R6 600cc	120.455 mph	1:15.10.49
8	(Northern Ireland) Michael Dunlop	Yamaha R6 600cc	119.838 mph	1:15.33.71
9	(Northern Ireland) Adrian Archibald	Yamaha R6 600cc	119.179 mph	1:15.58.79
10	(England) Daniel Stewart	Yamaha R6 600cc	119.118 mph	1:16.01.11

Fastest Lap and New Lap Record: Bruce Anstey – 125.359 mph (18'03.51) on lap 2.

==== 2008 Sidecar TT Race 'B' final standings ====
4 June 2008 3 Laps (113.00 Miles) Mountain Course.

Rank	Rider	Team	Speed	Time
1	(Isle of Man) Nick Crowe/Mark Cox	LCR Honda 600cc	113.989 mph	59' 34.76
2	(Isle of Man) Dave Molyneux/Dan Sayle	DMR Suzuki 600cc	113.654 mph	59' 45.31
3	(England) John Holden/Andrew Winkle	LCR Suzuki 600cc	112.585 mph	1:00.19.33
4	(England) Steve Norbury/Rick Long	Yamaha 600cc	112.144 mph	1:00.33.58
5	(Austria) Klaus Klaffenböck/Christian Parzer	LCR Honda 600cc	112.177 mph	1:00.34.47
6	(England) Tim Reeves/Patrick Farrance	LCR Suzuki 600cc	111.324 mph	1:00.59.76
7	(England) Phil Dongworth/Stuart Castles	Ireson Honda 600cc	110.830 mph	1:01.16.66
8	(England) Simon Neary/Jamie Winn	Suzuki 600cc	110.071 mph	1:01.19.27
9	(England) Nigel Connole/Dipash Chauhan	LCR Honda 600cc	109.801 mph	1:01.51.10
10	(England) Douglas Wright/Stuart Bond	Honda 600cc	109.049 mph	1:02.16.71

Fastest Lap: Nick Crowe and Mark Cox – 114.544 mph (19'45.81) on lap 2.

==== 2008 Senior TT final standings. ====
6 June 2008 6 Laps (236.38 Miles) Mountain Course.

Rank	Rider	Team	Speed	Time
1	(England) John McGuinness	Honda 1000cc	127.186 mph	1:46.47.69
2	(Australia) Cameron Donald	Suzuki GSXR 1000cc	126.183 mph	1:47.38.64
3	(England) Ian Hutchinson	Yamaha R1 1000cc	125.198 mph	1:48.29.44
4	(Northern Ireland) Ryan Farquhar	Kawasaki ZX10 1000cc	124.852 mph	1:48.47.45
5	(England) Steve Plater	Yamaha R1	124.195 mph	1:49.22.02
6	(England) Gary Johnson	Yamaha R1 1000cc	123.810 mph	1:49.42.39
7	(Wales) Ian Lougher	Yamaha R1 1000cc	123.493 mph	1:49.59.30
8	(England) Carl Rennie	Suzuki GSXR 1000cc	123.180 mph	1:50.16.08
9	(England) Daniel Stewart	Honda CBR 1000cc	122.905 mph	1:50.39.08
10	(Northern Ireland) Michael Dunlop	Yamaha R1 998cc	122.301 mph	1:51.03.62

==== 2008 Ultra-Lightweight TT final standings. ====
7 June 2008 12 Laps (51.00 Miles) Billown Circuit.

Rank	Rider	Team	Speed	Time
1	(England) Chris Palmer	Honda 125cc	94.042 mph	32' 32.309
2	(Isle of Man) Dan Sayle	Honda 125cc	92.414 mph	33' 06.716
3	(Northern Ireland) Nigel Moore	Honda 125cc	91.548 mph	33' 25.500
4	(England) James Ford	Honda 125cc	90.912 mph	33' 39.525
5	(England) Chris McGahan	Honda 125cc	90.379 mph	33' 51.452
6	(England) Peter Wakefield	Honda 125cc	90.371 mph	33' 51.633
7	(Northern Ireland) Samuel Dunlop	Honda 125cc	89.120 mph	34' 20.136
8	(Northern Ireland) Barry Davidson	Honda 125cc	89.092 mph	34' 20.787
9	(New Zealand) Paul Dobbs	Honda 125cc	89.043 mph	34' 21.931
10	(England) Robert Knight	Honda 125cc	88.825 mph	34' 26.982

==== 2008 Lightweight TT final standings. ====
7 June 2008 12 Laps (51.00 Miles) Billown Circuit.

Rank	Rider	Team	Speed	Time
1	(Wales) Ian Lougher	Honda 250cc	100.741 mph	30' 22.495
2	(Northern Ireland) Ryan Farquhar	Honda 250cc	100.265 mph	30' 31.151
3	(England) Chris Palmer	Honda 250cc	98.607 mph	31' 01.940
4	(Northern Ireland) Andrew Neill	Honda 250cc	98.546 mph	31' 03.093
5	(Northern Ireland) Davy Morgan	Honda 250cc	96.314 mph	31' 46.270
6	(Wales) Gary Owen	Honda 250cc	95.722 mph	31' 58.045
7	(England) Phil Harvey	Honda 250cc	94.405 mph	32' 24.803
8	(England) Paul Shoesmith	Honda 250cc	92.576 mph	30' 17.957
9	(Northern Ireland) Sam Dunlop	Honda 250cc	92.470 mph	30' 20.051
10	(England) Chris Barrett	Yamaha 250cc	91.630 mph	30' 36.733

==== 2008 600cc/1000cc Support Race final standings. ====
7 June 2008 9 Laps (38.25 Miles) Billown Circuit.

Rank	Rider	Team	Speed	Time
1	(Northern Ireland) Ryan Farquhar	Kawasaki	105.988 mph	21' 39.200
2	(Wales) Ian Lougher	Yamaha R1 1000cc	104.547 mph	21' 57.108
3	(Scotland) Mark Buckley	Honda 1000cc	103.720 mph	22' 07.615
4	(England) Mark Parrett	Honda 1000cc	103.073 mph	22' 15.948
5	(Isle of Man) Gary Carswell	Suzuki 1000cc	102.907 mph	22' 18.104
6	(Northern Ireland) Paul Cranston	Honda 1000cc	102.766 mph	22' 19.937
7	(England) Roy Richardson	Yamaha 599cc	102.745 mph	22' 20.206
8	(New Zealand) Paul Dobbs	Suzuki 1000cc	102.627 mph	22' 21.448
9	(Northern Ireland) Michael Dunlop	Suzuki 1000cc	101.946 mph	22' 30.712
10	(Isle of Man) Stephen Oates	Suzuki 600cc	101.256 mph	22' 30.712

== Bibliography ==
- "Island Racer 2008: Ultimate Isle of Man TT Racing Guide". Island Racer. Mortons Media Group. 2008 – via Kelsey Publishing.
