= 2009 Ulster Grand Prix =

Motorcycle race in Northern Ireland

The 2009 Ulster Grand Prix incorporating the Dundrod 150 National Road Races took place between Wednesday 12 August and Saturday 15 August 2009 on the 7.401 mile Dundrod Circuit, County Antrim, Northern Ireland. Six races were held with Ian Hutchinson, Ryan Farquhar, Guy Martin, William Dunlop (two wins) and Conor Cummins sharing the victories. Farquhar also took a class win in the Supertwins.

== Race results ==
=== Race 1; 2009 1000cc Superstock race final standings ===
Saturday 18 August 2009 6 laps – 44.406 miles Dundrod Circuit

Rank	Rider	Team	Time	Speed
1	(England) Ian Hutchinson	Honda 1000cc	21' 08.383	125.329 mph
2	(Northern Ireland) Ryan Farquhar	Kawasaki 1000cc	+ 0.339	125.296 mph
3	(Scotland) Keith Amor	Honda 1000cc	+ 13.010	124.057 mph
4	(England) Guy Martin	Honda 1000cc	+ 17.825	123.592 mph
5	(Isle of Man) Conor Cummins	Kawasaki 1000cc	+ 18.979	122.481 mph
6	(New Zealand) Bruce Anstey	Suzuki 1000cc	+ 25.973	122.814 mph
7	(England) Gary Johnson	Honda 1000cc	+ 59.674	119.698 mph
8	(England) James McBride	Yamaha 1000cc	+ 1' 12.797	118.526 mph
9	(Northern Ireland) Stephen Thompson	Honda 1000cc	+ 1' 18.289	118.043 mph
10	(England) Rob Denver	Suzuki 1000cc	+ 1' 31.150	116.926 mph

Fastest Lap and new lap record: Ian Hutchinson, 3' 24.770 130.117 mph on lap 6

=== Race 2; 2009 600cc Supersport race final standings ===
Saturday 18 August 2009 7 laps – 51.807 miles Dundrod Circuit

Rank	Rider	Team	Time	Speed
1	(Northern Ireland) Ryan Farquhar	Kawasaki 600cc	24' 46.527	125.163 mph
2	(England) Ian Hutchinson	Honda 600cc	+ 0.001	125.163 mph
3	(Northern Ireland) Michael Dunlop	Yamaha 600cc	+ 0.662	125.107 mph
4	(Wales) Ian Lougher	Yamaha 600cc	+ 0.797	125.096 mph
5	(England) Guy Martin	Honda 600cc	+ 1.621	125.027 mph
6	(Isle of Man) Conor Cummins	Kawasaki 600cc	+ 1.804	125.011 mph
7	(England) Gary Johnson	Honda 600cc	+ 40.167	121.870 mph
8	(Northern Ireland) Michael Pearson	Honda 600cc	+ 1' 08.369	119.660 mph
9	(Republic of Ireland) John Walsh	Yamaha 600cc	+ 1' 08.526	119.648 mph
10	(Czech Republic) Michal Dokoupil	Kawasaki 600cc	+ 1' 08.979	119.643 mph

Fastest Lap: Ian Lougher, 3' 29.949 126.907 mph on lap 6

=== Race 6; 2009 UGP Supporters Club Superbike race final standings ===
Saturday 18 August 2009 7 laps – 51.807 miles Dundrod Circuit

Rank	Rider	Team	Time	Speed
1	(England) Guy Martin	Honda 1000cc	23' 38.712	131.146 mph
2	(England) Gary Johnson	Honda 1000cc	+ 0.117	131.135 mph
3	(England) Ian Hutchinson	Honda 1000cc	+ 0.241	131.124 mph
4	(Isle of Man) Conor Cummins	Kawasaki 1000cc	+ 0.417	131.107 mph
5	(Wales) Ian Lougher	Yamaha 1000cc	+ 28.379	128.568 mph
6	(Northern Ireland) Adrian Archibald	Suzuki 1000cc	+ 28.453	128.568 mph
7	(Northern Ireland) Michael Dunlop	Yamaha 1000cc	+ 44.050	127.197 mph
8	(England) James McBride	Yamaha 1000cc	+ 55.054	126.591 mph
9	(Northern Ireland) Michael Pearson	Honda 1000cc	+ 51.134	126.584 mph
10	(Czech Republic) Michal Dokoupil	Kawasaki 1000cc	+ 1' 17.037	124.391 mph

Fastest Lap: Gary Johnson, 3' 21.181 132.438 mph on lap 5

== See also ==
- North West 200
- Isle of Man TT
- Manx Grand Prix
