= Boyne 100 =

The Boyne 100 Road Races, held in Tullyallen, County Louth, Ireland, formed when a meeting of local enthusiasts got together in 2006 to revive the Tullyallen Motor Cycle Road Races, which were last held 40 years ago.

The first races took place in 1965 and 1966, organised by the Dublin-based Motor Enthusiasts Club. They intended to also run a car race but decided that the roads were too narrow, and so opted for a motorbike race instead. The 3.2 mile circuit includes a scenic view of the Boyne Valley and the new cable bridge from the paddock area. The circuit is located close to the town of Drogheda. Motorcycle road races, such as this, are unique to Ireland and the Isle of Man.

The local rider Pat Maloney raced on this circuit, coming second on a 350cc AJS. He narrowly missed out on first place due to the unforeseen obstruction of a farmer bringing cattle from one field to another.

Entrants for 2006 included Martin Finnegan who ran in the Open, 600 and Superbike races. The Dunlop's Michael, William and Robert, Ryan Farquhar and Adrian Archibald, then local riders Adrian O’Sullivan, Wayne Kirwan, Killian Galligan, Shane Connor, Steve O’Brien, and Leo Fitzgerald.

A parade lap on 22 September 2006 took place on the original circuit, first used in 1965 and again in 1966. Motorcycles of all types and ages were on display.

The Boyne 100 Road Races are the twenty-fifth and final round of the 2006 Duke Road Race Rankings Championship.

Davy Morgan holds the lap record for the races.
