= 2005 Isle of Man TT =

Annual motorcycle racing event

Isle of Man TT Mountain Course

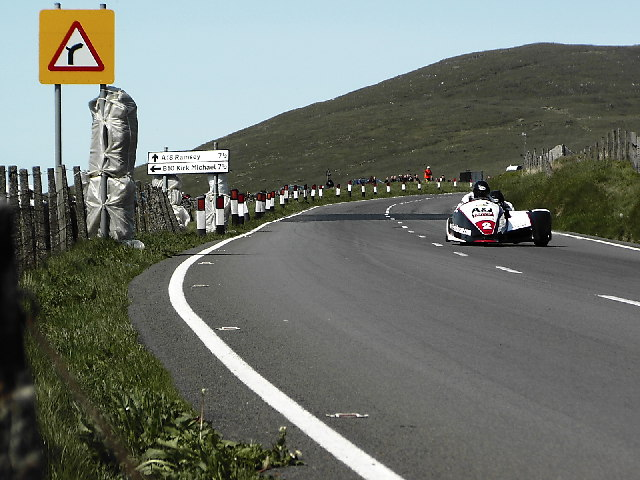
Sidecar TT Race A winners Nick Crowe and Darren Hope at Brandywell

The 2005 Isle of Man TT Festival was the 98th run and took place between Saturday 28 May and Friday 10 June on the 37.73 mile (60.72 km) Mountain course. The first week (between 28 May and 3 June) is known as the practice week, before the real action was due to commence on 4 June. Bad weather meant that the Superbike race was held over until Sunday (5 June). There were only 7 races in this year because this was the first year the smaller 250 bikes & Production models did not race at the TT, instead they were replaced with Superbike, Supersport & Superstock races.

The Sidecar TT Race A, was supposed to be race 2 but due to inclement weather forced the postponement of the Superbike TT for 24 hours, the Sidecars became the first race.

John McGuinness won the Superbike TT and Senior TT, and was the only competitor to win multiple races that year.

Three competitors died during the event: Joakim Karlsson, Les Harah and Gus Scott. Gus Scott, a rider-journalist participating in his first TT, died after colliding with Kirk Michael resident and marshall April Bolster, who was crossing the road to attend to another rider. Bolster also died instantly.

== Results ==
- Race 1 – TT Sidecar Race 'A' 4 June 2005 (3 laps – 113.00 miles) Mountain Course.

Rank	Rider	Team	Speed	Time
1	(Isle of Man) Nick Crowe / Darren Hope	Honda	109.85 mph (176.79 km/h)	1:01.49.3
2	(England) Steve Norbury / Andrew Smith	Yamaha	109.78 mph (176.67 km/h)	1:01.51.6
3	(England) John Holden / Jamie Winn	Honda	107.61 mph (173.18 km/h)	1:03.06.5
4	(England) Philip Dongworth / Stuart Castles	Ireson	105.61 mph (169.96 km/h)	1:04.18.6
5	(England) Simon Neary / Stuart Bond	Yamaha	105.47 mph (169.74 km/h)	1:04.23.2
6	(England) Tony Baker / Mark Hegarty	Yamaha	105.51 mph (169.8 km/h)	1:04.40.3
7	(England) Ben Dixon / Mark Lambert	Honda	104.89 mph (168.8 km/h)	1:04:44.6
8	(Austria) Klaus Klaffenböck / Christian Parzer	Honda	104.45 mph (168.1 km/h)	1:05.01.1
9	(England) Roger Stockton / Peter Alton	Shelbourne	103.43 mph (166.45 km/h)	1:05.39.7
10	(England) Bill Currie / Kerry Williams	Windle Yamaha	102.32 mph (164.67 km/h)	1:06.22.1

- Race 2 – TT Superbike Race 5 June (6 laps – 226.38 miles)

Rank	Rider	Team	Speed	Time
1	(England) John McGuinness	Yamaha R1	124.124 mph (199.758 km/h)	1:49.25.74
2	(Northern Ireland) Adrian Archibald	Suzuki GSX-R	123.441 mph (198.659 km/h)	1:50.02.04
3	(Republic of Ireland) Martin Finnegan	Honda CBR	122.034 mph (196.395 km/h)	1:51.18.16
4	(Wales) Ian Lougher	Honda CBR	121.587 mph (195.675 km/h)	1:51.42.70
5	(Republic of Ireland) Raymond Porter	Yamaha R1	121.109 mph (194.906 km/h)	1:52.09.16
6	(England) Guy Martin	Suzuki	120.863 mph (194.51 km/h)	1:52.22.87
7	(Wales) Jason Griffiths	Yamaha R1	120.791 mph (194.394 km/h)	1:52.26.88
8	(Chile) Chris Campbell	Honda CBR998	120.126 mph (193.324 km/h)	1:53.05.38
9	(Japan) Jun Maeda	Honda CBR	119.231 mph (191.884 km/h)	1:53.55.19
10	(England) Ian Armstrong	Yamaha R1	118.05 mph (189.98 km/h)	1:55.03.55

- Race 3 – TT Supersport, Race A 6 June (4 laps – 150.92 miles)

Rank	Rider	Team	Speed	Time
1	(Wales) Ian Lougher	Honda CBR	120.928 mph (194.615 km/h)	1:14.52.84
2	(England) John McGuinness	Yamaha R6	120.332 mph (193.656 km/h)	1:15.15.46
3	(Wales) Jason Griffiths	Yamaha R6	119.407 mph (192.167 km/h)	1:15.50.07
4	(New Zealand) Bruce Anstey	Suzuki GSX-R	119.249 mph (191.913 km/h)	1:15.56.10
5	(England) Guy Martin	Honda CBR	118.488 mph (190.688 km/h)	1:16.25.36
6	(Republic of Ireland) Raymond Porter	Yamaha R6	118.387 mph (190.525 km/h)	1:16.29.25
7	(Northern Ireland) Darran Lindsay	Honda CBR	118.235 mph (190.281 km/h)	1:16:35.18
8	(Northern Ireland) Adrian Archibald	Suzuki GSX-R	117.598 mph (189.256 km/h)	1:17.00.04
9	(Japan) Jun Maeda	Honda CBR	117.466 mph (189.043 km/h)	1:17.06.03
10	(Isle of Man) Nigel Beattie	Yamaha R6	117.252 mph (188.699 km/h)	1:17.13.69

- Race 4 – Superstock 6 June (3 laps – 113.00 miles)

Rank	Rider	Team	Speed	Time
1	(New Zealand) Bruce Anstey	Suzuki GSX-R	124.242 mph (199.948 km/h)	54.39.74
2	(Wales) Ian Lougher	Honda Fireblade	122.894 mph (197.779 km/h)	55:15.73
3	(Northern Ireland) Ryan Farquhar	Kawasaki ZX-10	122.853 mph (197.713 km/h)	55.16.82
4	(Wales) Jason Griffiths	Yamaha R1	122.21 mph (196.68 km/h)	55:34.28
5	(England) Guy Martin	Suzuki GSX-R	122.201 mph (196.663 km/h)	55.34.53
6	(Isle of Man) Paul Hunt	Suzuki GSX-R	122.096 mph (196.494 km/h)	55:37.39
7	(Republic of Ireland) Martin Finnegan	Honda CBR	121.993 mph (196.329 km/h)	55.40.22
8	(Northern Ireland) Richard Britton	Honda	121.363 mph (195.315 km/h)	55.57.54
9	(England) Ian Hutchinson	Honda	120.095 mph (193.274 km/h)	56.33.00
10	(Isle of Man) Chris Heath	Yamaha YZF R1	119.991 mph (193.107 km/h)	56.35.93

- Race 5 – Sidecar TT, Race B 8 June (3 laps – 113.00 miles)

Rank	Rider	Team	Speed	Time
1	(Isle of Man) Dave Molyneux / Daniel Sayle	DMR Honda	114.901 mph (184.915 km/h)	59.06.39
2	(Isle of Man) Nick Crowe / Darren Hope	DMR Honda	112.305 mph (180.737 km/h)	1:00.28.37
3	(England) Steve Norbury / Andrew Smith	Shelbourne	110.129 mph (177.235 km/h)	1:01.40.06
4	(England) Simon Neary / Stuart Bond	Yamaha	108.969 mph (175.369 km/h)	1:02.19.43
5	(England) Roy Hanks / David Wells	Molyneux-Rose	108.428 mph (174.498 km/h)	1:02.38.10
6	(England) Ben Dixon / Mark Lambert	Honda	107.999 mph (173.808 km/h)	1:02.53.00
7	(England) John Holden / Jamie Winn	Honda	107.498 mph (173.001 km/h)	1:03.10.60
8	(England) Tony Baker / Mark Hegarty	Yamaha	107.33 mph (172.73 km/h)	1:03.16.53
9	(England) Roger Stockton / Peter Alton	Shelbourne	106.355 mph (171.162 km/h)	1:03.51.34
10	(England) Bill Currie / Kerry Williams	Windle Yamaha	105.739 mph (170.17 km/h)	1:04.13.66

- Race 6 – TT Supersport, Race B 8 June (4 laps – 150.92 miles)

Rank	Rider	Team	Speed	Time
1	(Northern Ireland) Ryan Farquhar	Kawasaki ZX-6R	120.697 mph (194.243 km/h)	1:15.01.42
2	(Wales) Jason Griffiths	Yamaha R6	120.315 mph (193.628 km/h)	1:15.15.72
3	(Republic of Ireland) Raymond Porter	Yamaha R6	119.992 mph (193.108 km/h)	1:15.30.53
4	(England) Guy Martin	Honda CBR	119.252 mph (191.917 km/h)	1:15.55.99
5	(Republic of Ireland) Martin Finnegan	Honda CBR	119.121 mph (191.707 km/h)	1:16.01.00
6	(Japan) Jun Maeda	Honda CBR	118.454 mph (190.633 km/h)	1:16.26.66
7	(England) Ian Hutchinson	Honda CBR	118.397 mph (190.542 km/h)	1:16.28.89
8	(Isle of Man) Nigel Beattie	Yamaha R6	117.899 mph (189.74 km/h)	1:16.48.28
9	(Isle of Man) Gary Carswell	Yamaha R6	117.402 mph (188.94 km/h)	1:17.07.78
10	(England) Chris Palmer	Honda	117.332 mph (188.828 km/h)	1:17.10.52

- Race 7 – Senior TT 10 June (6 laps – 226.38 miles)

Rank	Rider	Team	Speed	Time
1	(England) John McGuinness	Yamaha R1	124.342 mph (200.109 km/h)	1:49.15.16
2	(Wales) Ian Lougher	Honda	123.67 mph (199.03 km/h)	1:49:49.84
3	(England) Guy Martin	Suzuki	123.362 mph (198.532 km/h)	1:50.08.19
4	(Republic of Ireland) Martin Finnegan	Honda Fireblade	123.302 mph (198.435 km/h)	1:50.09.50
5	(Northern Ireland) Richard Britton	Honda	123.083 mph (198.083 km/h)	1:50.21.24
6	(Japan) Jun Maeda	Honda CBR	122.237 mph (196.721 km/h)	1:51.07.10
7	(Wales) Jason Griffiths	Yamaha R1	121.944 mph (196.25 km/h)	1:51.23.12
8	(England) Ian Hutchinson	Honda	120.287 mph (193.583 km/h)	1:52.55.19
9	(Isle of Man) Nigel Beattie	Yamaha R1	119.884 mph (192.935 km/h)	1:53.20.24
10	(England) Chris Palmer	Yamaha R1	119.334 mph (192.049 km/h)	1:53.49.29

== Bibliography ==
- "Island Racer 2005: Official Isle of Man TT Preview". Island Racer. Mortons Media Group. 2005 – via Kelsey Publishing.
