= 2008 Southern 100 Races =

In 2008 the Southern 100 motorcycle races on the Isle of Man featured a Solo Championship race, won by the Welsh rider Ian Lougher on a 1000cc Yamaha.

== Race 11; Solo Championship Race ==
Thursday 10 July 2008 – Billown Circuit 4 laps (Reduced Race Distance) – 17.00 miles (25.76 km)

Rank	Rider	Team	Speed	Time
1	(Wales) Ian Lougher	1000cc Yamaha	101.205 mph	10' 04.715
2	(Northern Ireland) Ryan Farquhar	1000cc Kawasaki	99.656 mph	10' 14.675
3	(Isle of Man) Conor Cummins	1000cc Kawasaki	98.761 mph	10' 19.667
4	(Northern Ireland) Michael Dunlop	1000cc Yamaha	97.901 mph	10' 25.123
5	(Scotland) Mark Buckley	1000cc Honda	94.792 mph	10' 45.621
6	(Northern Ireland) John Burrows	1000cc Honda	94.591 mph	10' 46.996
7	(New Zealand) Paul Dobbs	1000cc Suzuki	94.022 mph	10' 50.912
8	(Isle of Man) Gary Carswell	1000cc Suzuki	93.801 mph	10' 52.442
9	(England) Tim Poole	1000cc Yamaha	93.626 mph	10' 53.667
10	(Northern Ireland) Adrian McFarland	600cc Honda	91.667 mph	11' 07.996

Fastest Lap; Ian Loughter – 2 minutes 28.301 seconds 103.169 mph
