= Billown Circuit =

Motorcycle road-race course on the Isle of Man

- Location: Castletown, Isle of Man
- Coordinates: 54°05′18″N 4°39′52″W
- Major events: Southern 100, Pre-TT Classic Races, National Road Races, Ultra-Lightweight TT, Lightweight TT
- Length: 4.25 mi (6.84 km)
- Turns: 14+
- Race lap record: 2:10.032 117.663 mph (189.360 km/h) (Dean Harrison, Honda, (2026))

The Billown Circuit is a motorcycle road-race course used for the Southern 100, the Pre-TT Classic races and the National Road Races meetings near Castletown on the Isle of Man. Racing is held on public roads closed for racing by an Act of Tynwald, the parliament of the Isle of Man.

The course is 4.25 miles (6.8 km) long and is in the parishes of Arbory and Malew. The course start-line is on the outskirts of Castletown and the course includes parts of the primary A5 New Castletown Road, the A28 Castletown to Ballabeg road, the A7 Ballasalla to Port Erin road and the A3 Castletown to Ramsey road.

== History ==
Following the closure of the former RAF Station at Andreas to motorcycle racing in 1954, and to celebrate the success of George 'Sparrow' Costain and Derek Ennett at the 1954 Manx Grand Prix, the Southern Motor Cycle Club (SMCC) proposed that a motorcycle circuit be developed in the area around Castletown in the Isle of Man.

The proposal for a "South TT" using roads around the new Castletown A5 by-pass and the Billown Mansion met with a lukewarm response, and an application for a grant of £500 for race expenditure was rejected by the Tynwald Race Committee in April 1955. A grant of £500 from local businesses, including T. H. Coleburn for a public address system, enabled the first Southern 100 road race event to be scheduled for July 1955 as a club-level race meeting.

The Billown Circuit became a regional registered circuit in 1956 and a National Racing circuit in 1957, with a maximum of 45 entries per class. In 1988 a new race meeting was introduced with the Pre-TT Classic races, followed by the National Road Races in 1990. The re-introduction of two-stroke racing at the 2008 Isle of Man TT, with a Lightweight TT and Ultra-Lightweight TT race, used the Billown Circuit to host Isle of Man TT races as part of the 2008 National Road Race meeting.

== Speed and race records ==
The lap record for the Billown Circuit is 2 minutes 10.032 seconds at a lap speed of 117.663 mph (189.360 km/h) set by Dean Harrison during the 2026 races. The current sidecar lap record, set in 2025, stands at 103.281 mph, achieved by Ryan and Callum Crowe.

== List of fatal accidents involving competitors ==
No.	Rider	Date	Place	Race	Event	Machine
1	(England) Maurice A.Bowdery	10 July 1958	Castletown Corner	1958 Southern 100	Junior	
2	(United Kingdom) Tom Swindlehurst	9 July 1964		1964 Southern 100	Senior	500cc Norton
3	(United Kingdom) Graham Naylor	July 1970	Williams Corner	1970 Southern 100	Senior	
4	(United Kingdom) Mike Pepper	July 1973	Great Meadow	1973 Southern 100		
5	(Northern Ireland) Jim Farlow.	9 July 1974	Church Bends	1974 Southern 100		
6	(England) Tony Dickinson	15 July 1981	Billown Dip (Black hole)	1981 Southern 100	250 Race	247 Yamaha (F)
7	(Wales) Graham Williams	July 1983	Church Bends	1983 Southern 100		
8	(Scotland) John Tawse	July 1985	Church Bends	1985 Southern 100	Practice	250cc Rotax
9	(United Kingdom) Steve Taylor	10 July 1988	Great Meadow	1988 Southern 100	Solo Championship	
10	(Isle of Man) Andy Bassett	July 1991	Billown Dip	1991 Southern 100	Practice	350cc Yamaha
11	(United Kingdom) Roger Allen	2 June 1992	Ballakeighan Corner	1992 Pre-TT Classic	Vintage Classic Race	498cc Triumph
12	(United Kingdom) Michael Bellerby	30 May 1995	Ballanorris	1995 Pre-TT Classic	Senior Classic Race	
13	(Isle of Man) Matthew Wood	30 May 1995	Ballanorris	1995 Pre-TT Classic	Senior Classic Race	
14	(United Kingdom) Rob Harrison	18 July 1994	Iron Gate	1994 Southern 100		
15	(United Kingdom) Graham Hayne	July 1996	Great Meadow	1996 Southern 100	Practice	600cc Yamaha
16	(Isle of Man) Michael Craig	July 1996	Great Meadow	1996 Southern 100	Practice	600cc Yamaha
17	(United Kingdom) Dave Pinkerton	July 1996	Great Meadow	1996 Southern 100	Practice	350cc Yamaha
18	(United Kingdom) Gavin Lee	13 July 1999	Williams Corner	1999 Southern 100		250cc Yamaha
19	(United Kingdom) Marc McDonald	13 July 1999	Williams Corner	1999 Southern 100		600cc Kawasaki
20	(United Kingdom) Andy Brown	9 July 2003	Ballawhetstone	2003 Southern 100		600cc — Ireson Yamaha
21	(United Kingdom) John Dowling	9 July 2003	Ballawhetstone	2003 Southern 100 (Sidecar Passenger)		600cc — Ireson Yamaha
22	(United Kingdom) Tony Smith	25 May 2006	Iron Gate	2006 Pre-TT Classic	Practice	
23	(United Kingdom) Barry Pepperrell	25 May 2006	Iron Gate	2006 Pre-TT Classic (Sidecar Passenger)	Practice	
24	(England) Phillip Dongworth	14 July 2009	Ballanorris	2009 Southern 100	Practice	600cc Ireson Honda
25	(Isle of Man) David Jukes	8 July 2013	Ballakeighan Corner	2013 Southern 100	Practice	600cc Yamaha
26	(Isle of Man) Mark Madsen-Mygdal	11 July 2013	Castletown Stadium	2013 Southern 100	600cc Race B	600cc Yamaha
27	(Isle of Man) Paul Thomas	11 July 2013	Osbourne's	2013 Southern 100 (Sidecar Passenger)	Sidecar Championship Race	600c Baker Yamaha
28	(Isle of Man) Dean Martin	28 May 2016	Billown Dip	2016 Pre-TT Classic	Practice	
29	(England) James Cowton	12 July 2018	Stadium Bends	2018 Southern 100	600cc Challenge Race	600cc Kawasaki
30	(Republic of Ireland) Alan Connor	11 July 2023	Castletown Bypass	2023 Southern 100	Practice	Suzuki
31	(England) Alan Oversby	24th May 2026	Hedges	2026 PreTT Classic	400cc Race	400cc Kawasaki

== List of riders by overall numbers of races won ==
Rider	Wins
Joey Dunlop, Ian Lougher	42
Dean Harrison	27
Michael Dunlop	26
Jason Griffiths, Chris Palmer,	22
Ryan Farquhar	21
Dave Madsen-Mygdal	19
Kenny Harrison	18
Dave Leech	17
Bob Heath, Dave Molyneux	15
William Dunlop, Bill Swallow	14
Bill Smith	13
Lowry Burton, Bob Jackson, Jason Griffiths, Guy Martin	12
Derek Walley	11
Barry Wood, Robert Dunlop, Tim Reeves, Davey Todd	10
Geoff Bell, Ray McCullough, Ivan Lintin, Dan Sayle	9
Mike Hose, Bud Jackson	8
Ian Bell, Nick Crowe, Selwyn Griffiths, Darran Lindsay	7
Charlie Freeman, Bob Jackson, Phillip McCallen, Alan Oversby, Tim Poole	6
Colin Bevan, Blair Degerholm, John Knowles, Dave Pither, Roy Richardson, Meryvn Stratford, Alan Steele, Charlie Williams, Derek Young, John Watson, Mark Wilkes, Alistair Howarth, Rob Hodson	5
Ian Bell, Tony Baker, Mick Burcombe, Bill Davie, Geoff Hands, Alan Oversby, Klaus Klaffenböck, Ben Birchall, Mike Browne	4
Terry Shepherd, Tim Poole, Darryl Tweed, Pete Founds, Jevan Walmsley	3
Bill Currie,(Pete & Ron Hardy) Kenny Howles, Greg Lambert, Geoff Young, Rob Bellas	2

== See also ==
- Isle of Man TT Races
- Manx Grand Prix
- Clypse Course
- St. John's Short Course
