= Skerries 100 =

Multi-race motorcycle event in Ireland

Coordinates: 53°33′44″N 6°08′08″W

- Venue: Road course (anti-clockwise)
- Location: Skerries, County Dublin, Ireland
- First race: 1946
- Most wins (rider): Joey Dunlop (17)

Circuit information
- Surface: Tarmac
- Length: 2.92 mi (4.70 km)
- Lap record: 110.373 mph (177.628 km/h) (Michael Dunlop)

The Skerries 100 is a multi-race event for motorcycles held annually on countryside roads local to the town of Skerries, County Dublin, Ireland, on the first Saturday in July.

== History ==
The inaugural Skerries 100 race was on Saturday 6 July, 1946. In the early years the race was run by a local development committee, and the Dublin and District Motor Cycle Club ran the event each year until 1986 when they handed it over to Loughshinny Motor Cycle Supporters Club who for a number of previous years had been providing local volunteers for running of the event. Since 1987 the Loughshinny Motor Cycle Supporters Club have been running the event.

In 2009, a major bend on the course was renamed from 'Dublin Corner' to Finnegan's Corner to honour Irish motorcycle road racer Martin Finnegan, who died in 2008 as a result of a crash during a race at the Tandragee 100 meeting on another road course in County Armagh.

== Layout ==
The original circuit was 7.1 miles long and ran through the main street of Skerries town to right hand corner at the turn-off for Lusk, on the Dublin road into Skerries. In later years the course was reduced to a shorter circuit which ran down to the railway bridge, turned right and exited at the old paddock at the top end of Skerries main street alongside the seawall. During the early 1970s the course was reduced further to its present circuit, but ran in the opposite direction to the present day event.

== Incidents ==
Samuel Thom, a 78 year old spectator, was seriously injured in 2008 when two motorcycles collided near him, spraying him with ignited fuel, inflicting severe burns. The motorcyclists involved were not badly injured. Thom later sued for damages.

An unnamed competitor was killed in 2010, while a spectator was taken to hospital with minor injuries.

John Hinds, a doctor, died in July 2015 after crashing his motorcycle whilst providing care at a practice session for race participants in the Skerries 100.

William Dunlop died following a crash during practice at the 2018 Skerries Road Races.

In 2026, John O'Donovan was competing in the Junior Support race, the second race of the day, when he was involved in a fatal crash.
