= Nick Crowe (sidecar racer) =

British motorcycle racer

- Nationality: Manx
Motorcycle racing career statistics
Isle of Man TT career
TTs contested	8 (2002 - 2009)
TT wins	5
First TT win	2005 Sidecar TT Race A
Last TT win	2008 Sidecar TT Race B
TT podiums	11

Nick Crowe (born 1971) is a 5-time Isle of Man TT Winner and 2008 British F2 Champion of sidecar racing. He started his career as a passenger before switching to driver in 2000, handing the passenger seat to his childhood friend Darren Hope.

In 2001, the TT races were cancelled due to Foot and Mouth, so Nick and Darren concentrated on different races in the UK and the Isle of Man. The next year was a good year for the pair. In 2004, with the purchase of Dave Molyneux's outfit, the team could go faster in the Southern 100, at Jurby, and in the TT. 2005 brought Nick's first TT win in Race A, beating rival Dave Molyneux, who finished second in Race B.

In 2006, the A & J Groundworks outfit won the Double, both Race A and B. In 2007, with new passenger Daniel Sayle, Crowe set what was then the fastest-ever sidecar lap. However, the team were forced to retire from the lead in both races. With another new passenger, Mark Cox, Crowe won both Race 1 and 2 in 2008. In 2009, Crowe and Cox were on a Honda HM Plant/Dave Hudspeth Carpets F2 600cc.

Crowe and Cox qualified in pole for the 2009 event but suffered mechanical failure whilst leading race one.

In race two, the pair crashed heavily at the 17 mile marker (Ballacob) on lap 1 and were taken to Noble's Hospital by air with serious fractures. The crash was caused by a hare running onto the course in front of the duo. The race was cancelled, as was the following practice for the Senior TT. Nick was flown to the United Kingdom where he had a number of operations. He eventually lost his right forearm and leg above the knee due to the crash.

Returning to the Island, Crowe became involved in sidecar racing, running his own team with Simon Neary and Paul Napton.

Nick is the father of sidecar racers Ryan and Callum Crowe, who are competing as a team in the Sidecar TT since 2019 and have as of 3 June 2025, won four Sidecar TTs.
