= Darran Lindsay =

British motorcycle racer (1972–2006)

- Nationality: Northern Irish
- Born: 1971
- Died: 2006 (aged 34–35)
Motorcycle racing career statistics
Isle of Man TT career
TTs contested	3 (1999-2000, 2005)
TT wins	0
TT podiums	0

Darran Lindsay (1971–2006) was a Northern Irish motorcycle road racer. He was killed on 9 September 2006 in practice for the Killalane road races, near Dublin. It is understood that his 600cc machine was in collision with another bike. He lived on the Dundrod Circuit. He was married to Kerry, and leaves three young children.

Lindsay had a reasonably successful career, winning two Manx Grand Prix races, one North West 200 race in 2005, Ulster Grand Prix races, and had four Irish National Championships. He had been racing since 1990.
