= Martin Finnegan =

Irish motorcycle racer (1979–2008)

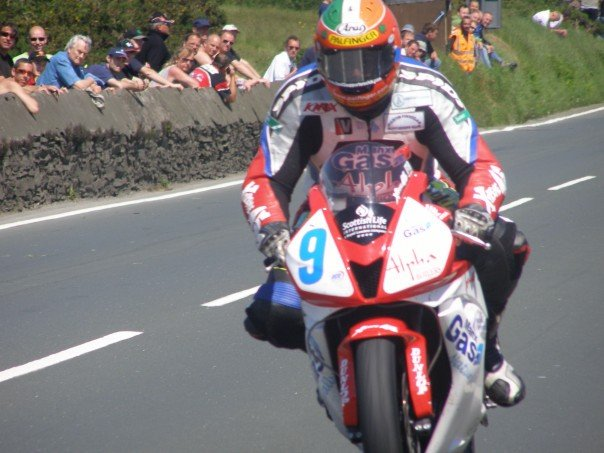
- Finnegan at the Isle of Man TT in 2007.
- Nationality: Irish
- Born: 8 October 1979; Lusk, County Dublin, Republic of Ireland
- Died: 3 May 2008 (aged 28); Tandragee, County Armagh, Northern Ireland
Motorcycle racing career statistics
Isle of Man TT career
TTs contested	6 (2002–2007)
TT wins	0
TT podiums	1

Martin Finnegan (8 October 1979 – 3 May 2008) was an Irish motorcycle racer.

== Career ==
Born in Lusk, County Dublin, Finnegan took up riding at a young age. At first he went grass track racing where he tasted success. In his later teens his boss at the time, Tony Carton, offered Finnegan the lend of a bike to try his hand at circuit racing. They went out that day and Finnegan did almost 100 laps and caught the bug.

A winner of 43 Irish road races since 1997, in addition to winning the 2000 Junior Newcomers Manx Grand Prix, Finnegan scored a podium at the 2005 Isle of Man TT where he became the fastest Irishman to lap the course at over 127 mph.

At the 2007 Isle of Man TT, Finnegan brought back to racing at competitive level on the island the Italian MV Agusta brand in the TT Superstock race, where he missed the podium reaching the fourth place on board of an F4 bike.

== Death and inquest ==
Finnegan died in Tandragee, Northern Ireland, in 2008 whilst competing in the Supersport race at the Tandragee 100 race meeting. As he approached a corner, his front brake failed. Whilst trying to stop the bike, his rear wheel hit a bump in the road which flipped Finnegan and his bike into a bank. Ryan Farquhar, who was directly behind Finnegan on the track, said that the rear tyre of Finnegan's bike was covered in oil. On 7 May 2008, Finnegan's funeral took place in his hometown of Lusk. About 2,000 motorcyclists travelled to Lusk to attend.

On 9 January 2012, the inquest into his death commenced. It was stated that after the crash a banjo bolt on the bike was found to be loose, however his mechanics and race scrutineers maintained that the bolt was tight before the start of the race and so could not have caused the brake failure which led to the crash. Instead, it was suggested by the scrutineer that brake knock-back was "the only logical explanation". Farquhar doubted that knock back was the cause, stating that he had not experienced it in over 500 races. The following day, coroner John Leckey delivered the verdict, stating "Having carefully considered all the evidence in conjunction with the agreed position of the experts, I am able to conclude that, on the balance of probabilities, the loose banjo bolt was the cause of failure of the front brake."

== Legacy ==
In 2009, Adrian Archibald received the inaugural Martin Finnegan Trophy for achieving the fastest lap by an Irishman at the Isle of Man TT. Michael Dunlop then won the award for two consecutive years in 2010 and 2011.

=== Winners of the Martin Finnegan Trophy ===
Year	Winner	Ref.
2009	Adrian Archibald	
2010	Michael Dunlop	
2011	Michael Dunlop	
2012	Michael Dunlop	
2013	Michael Dunlop	

== See also ==
- Richard Britton
