= Ian Lougher =

Welsh motorcycle racer

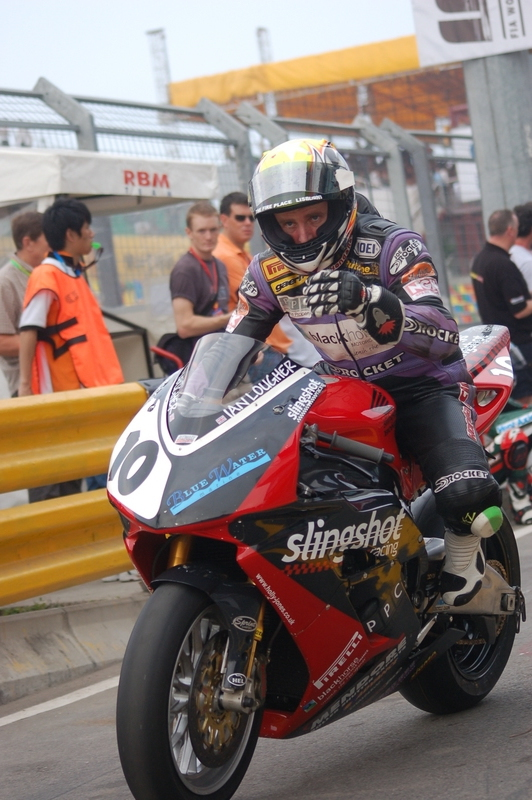
- Ian on the Slingshot Racing Honda at the 2006 Macau Grand Prix.
- Nationality: Welsh
- Born: 10 July 1963 (age 63); Cardiff, Wales
Motorcycle racing career statistics
Isle of Man TT career
TTs contested	139 (1984 - 2000, 2002 - 2025)
TT wins	10
First TT win	1990 350cc Junior TT
Last TT win	2009 Lightweight TT
TT podiums	30

Ian Lougher (born 10 July 1963) is a retired Welsh motorcycle racer, noted for eight victories at the North West 200, ten wins at the Isle of Man TT Races and 32 wins at the Southern 100 Races in his career.

== Racing career ==
Born in Cardiff, Lougher competed in club motor-cycle events in South Wales from 1982 until 1989. Lougher's first race was at Llandow on a Yamaha RD400, and his first race win was in 1983 at Pembrey.

== After racing career ==
Team owner of Team ILR (Ian Lougher Racing), in 2015 his riders were Dan Hegerty in real road racing, with Vasco van der Valk and Joe Thomas in the British Motostar Championship. In 2016, Team ILR had Nadieh Jonee Schoots, Holland, in the Stock 1000 Class, with Connall Courtney, Ireland, in the Motostar standard class.

A point on the Oliver's Mount race track was named Lougher's in 2014.

=== Manx Grand Prix ===
The first race in the Isle of Man for Lougher was the 1983 Manx Grand Prix in the Newcomers 350cc Junior Race. This Newcomers Race is now seen as a classic Manx Grand Prix race which was won by Robert Dunlop from Steve Hislop in second place and Lougher in third place at an average race speed of 100.62 mph.

=== 1983 Manx Grand Prix Newcomers Junior Race Results ===
Rank	Rider	Team	Speed	Time
1	(Northern Ireland) Robert Dunlop	Yamaha	102.46 mph	1:28.22.2
2	(Scotland) Steve Hislop	Yamaha	101.27	1:29.24.8
3	(Wales) Ian Lougher	Yamaha	100.62	1:29.59.2

A return visit by Lougher for the 1984 Manx Grand Prix resulted in a broken-collar bone after a crash on the Mountain Mile while riding a 250cc Armstrong during the 1984 Junior Manx Grand Prix.

Lougher announced his retirement from competitive racing on 14 October 2025, describing his career as "an incredible journey".

== Isle of Man TT Race Career ==
=== TT victories ===
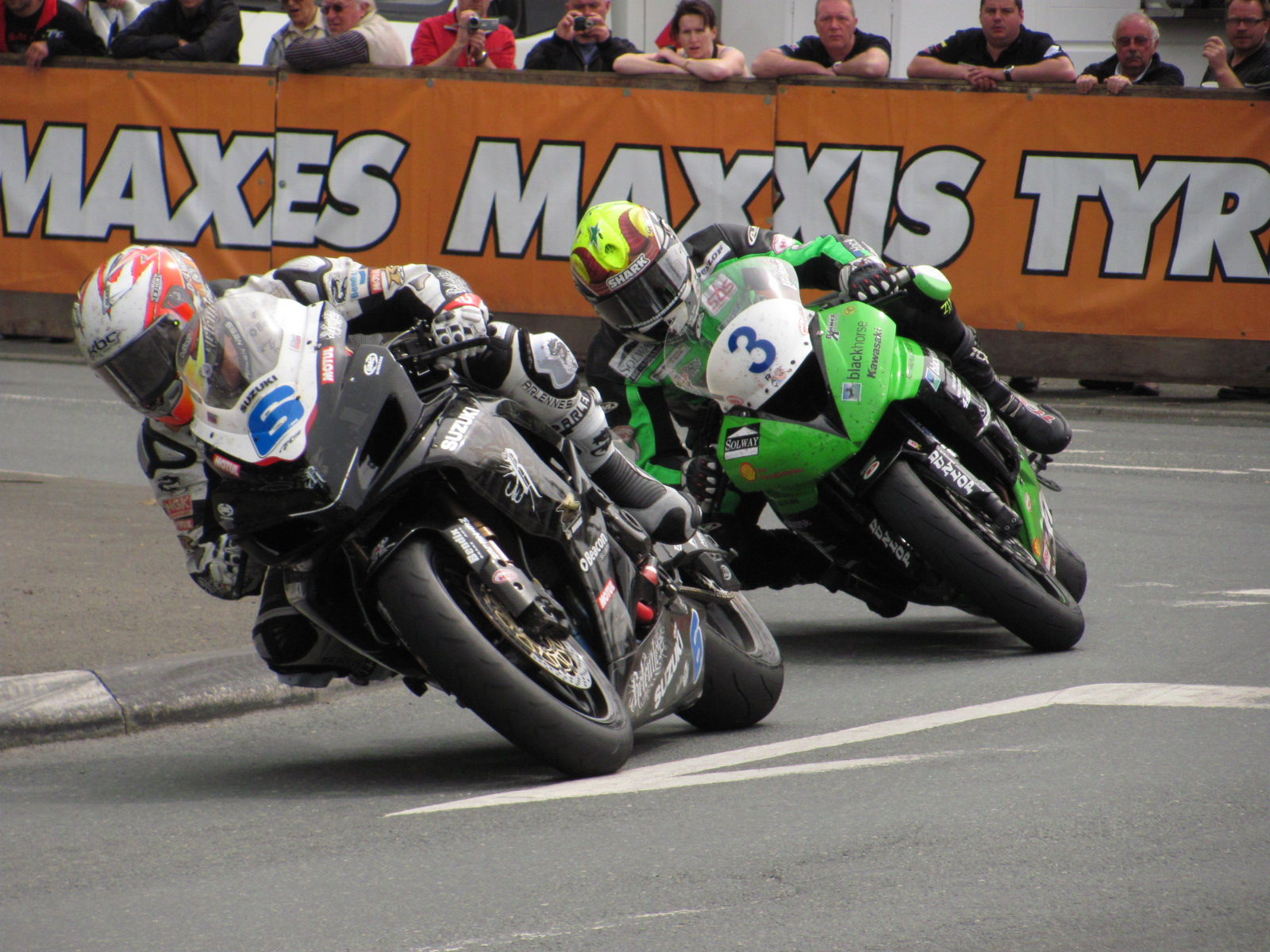
Lougher (#3) trailing Cameron Donald during the first Supersport race at the 2010 Isle of Man TT.

Year	Race & Capacity	Motorcycle	Average Speed
1990	Junior TT 250cc	Yamaha	115.16 mph
1997	Ultra-Lightweight TT 125cc	Honda	107.89 mph
1999	Ultra-Lightweight TT 125cc	Honda	107.43 mph
2002	Production TT 600cc	Suzuki	118.85 mph
2002	Ultra-Lightweight 125cc	Honda	108.65 mph
2005	Supersport Junior 'A' TT 600cc	Honda	120.928 mph
2008	Lightweight TT 250cc *	Honda	100.741 mph
2009	Ultra-Lightweight TT 125cc #1 *	Honda	94.911 mph
2009	Lightweight TT 250cc **	Honda	101.168 mph

- * – Indicates win on the Billown Circuit.
- ** – Indicates win over 2 legs on a points scoring basis.

=== TT career summary (top 6 only) ===
Finishing Position	1st	2nd	3rd	4th	5th	6th
Number of times	9	13	6	10	8	5

== Duke Road Race Rankings ==
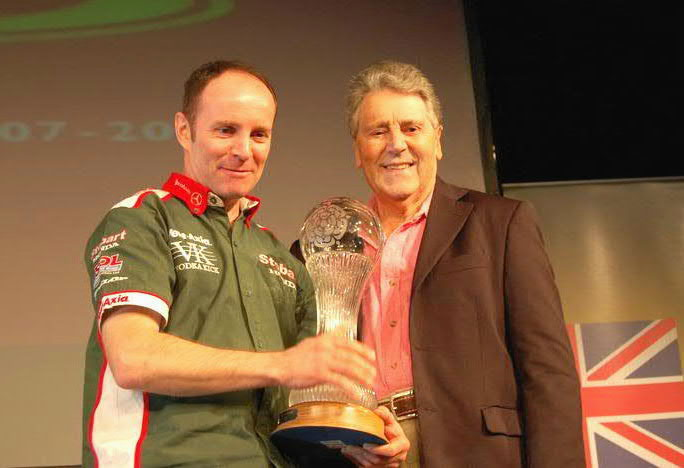
Ian receives his 2007 award

Lougher was the most successful rider in the early years of the Duke Road Racing Rankings after its inception in 2002, winning a then-record three times in 2002, 2005 and 2006. This is in part due to both Ian Lougher's international successes and his willingness to travel, competing at races all over Ireland, the Isle of Man, England, and his native Wales. Lougher's record was subsequently beaten by rival Ryan Farquhar, who went on to win the rankings a total of seven times.

== Career statistics ==
=== British 125 Championship ===
Year	Bike	1	2	3	4	5	6	7	8	9	10	11	12	Pos	Pts
2009	Honda	BHI	OUL	DON	THR	SNE	KNO	MAL	BHGP	CAD	CRO	SIL; 13	OUL	22nd	3
2011	Honda	BRH	OUL	CRO	THR	KNO	SNE	OUL	BRH	CAD	DON	SIL; 17	BRH	39th	0
