= Adrian Archibald =

British motorcycle racer

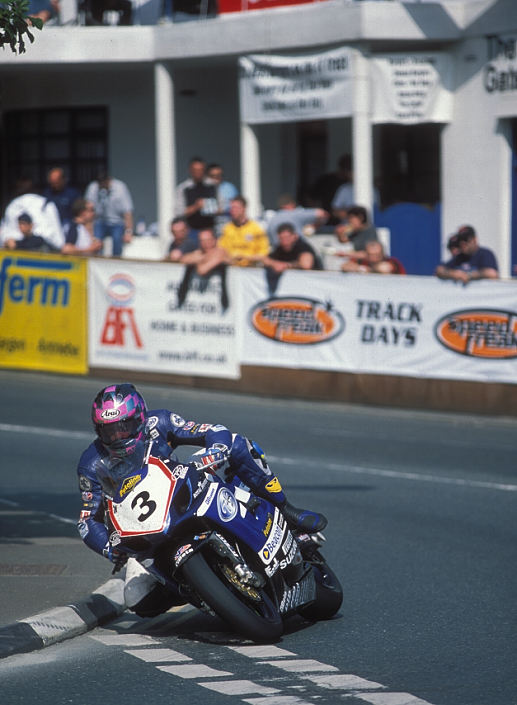
- Archibald took his first TT victory in the 2003 Formula One TT.
- Nationality: Northern Irish
- Born: 1969 (age 56–57); Ballymoney
Motorcycle racing career statistics
Isle of Man TT career
TTs contested	15 (1997-2012)
TT wins	3
First TT win	2003 Formula One TT
Last TT win	2004 Senior TT
TT podiums	8

Adrian James Archibald (born 1969) is a motorcycle racer from Northern Ireland.

Archibald, who was born in Ballymoney, has three career wins in the Isle of Man TT, including two races in 2003 riding for TAS Suzuki. The 2003 races were overshadowed by the death of Archibald's team-mate, David Jefferies. Archibald left the TAS team at the end of 2005 to move to AIM Racing Yamaha for the 2006 season, but when Ryan Farquhar was injured at the Cookstown 100 races at the end of April, he rejoined the TAS Suzuki team, after the North West 200 races. He remained with TAS in 2007, and rode with his own AMA Racing Team for 2008–10.

Archibald has also had four wins in the Ulster Grand Prix.
