= 2009 North West 200 Races =

The 2009 North West 200 Races took place on Saturday 16 May 2009 at the 8.966 mile circuit, dubbed "The Triangle", based around the towns of Coleraine, Portrush and Portstewart, in Northern Ireland. The 2009 race week was the 80th anniversary of the festival, when Malcolm McQuigg, Harry Meagen and Ernie Nott picked up the race wins in 1929.

Steve Plater and William Dunlop took double victories at the meeting, with Alastair Seeley winning the other race held. Two races were cancelled due to adverse weather conditions.

== Practice ==
=== Superbike ===
Bruce Anstey topped the timesheets on Tuesday, on his Relentless Suzuki ahead of the Hondas of John McGuinness, Keith Amor and Steve Plater. Anstey's team-mate Cameron Donald rounded out the top five, ahead of the first Yamaha of Michael Rutter and the Kawasakis of Ryan Farquhar and Conor Cummins.

In the Thursday session affected by rain, Guy Martin topped the timesheets on the Hydrex Honda CBR1000RR, just ahead of a similar bike ridden by Ian Hutchinson. Denver Robb was third on his Suzuki GSX-R1000, as times were over ten seconds slower than Tuesday.

Rank	Rider	Team	Time	Speed
1	(New Zealand) Bruce Anstey	Suzuki 1000cc	4:25.371	121.632 mph
2	(England) John McGuinness	Honda 1000cc	+ 1.400	120.994 mph
3	(Northern Ireland) Alastair Seeley	Suzuki 1000cc	+ 3.383	120.101 mph
4	(Scotland) Keith Amor	Honda 1000cc	+ 3.843	119.896 mph
5	(England) Steve Plater	Honda 1000cc	+ 4.774	119.483 mph
6	(Australia) Cameron Donald	Suzuki 1000cc	+ 4.898	119.428 mph
7	(England) Michael Rutter	Yamaha 1000cc	+ 5.739	119.057 mph
8	(Northern Ireland) Ryan Farquhar	Kawasaki 1000cc	+ 5.977	118.953 mph
9	(Isle of Man) Conor Cummins	Kawasaki 1000cc	+ 6.250	118.833 mph
10	(Wales) Ian Lougher	Yamaha 1000cc	+ 6.637	118.664 mph

=== Superstock ===
Carrickfergus-born Alastair Seeley dominated the first Tuesday Superstock session, setting a lap of 4:28.754, giving him an advantage of over 2.5 seconds. The lap was also good enough for the third fastest lap in the Superbike/Superstock session. Dungannon's Farquhar was second on a Kawasaki, while an all-Irish top three was completed by Kilkenny's John Walsh on his Yamaha. Cummins was fourth on his Kawasaki while William Dunlop's Yamaha rounded out the top five.

In the second session, Donald set the fastest time, just 0.7 seconds behind his team-mate Seeley, with the third Relentless Suzuki of Anstey in third.

Thursday's session was affected by adverse weather conditions, with Derek Brien topping the timesheets but was some nine seconds off the pace of Seeley. Seeley was only sixteenth in the session, as he would only set three laps in the session. Les Shand was second, just edging out another Yamaha, ridden by Michael Pearson.

Rank	Rider	Team	Time	Speed
1	(Northern Ireland) Alastair Seeley	Suzuki 1000cc	4:28.754	120.101 mph
2	(Australia) Cameron Donald	Suzuki 1000cc	+ 0.724	119.778 mph
3	(New Zealand) Bruce Anstey	Suzuki 1000cc	+ 2.115	119.163 mph
4	(Northern Ireland) Ryan Farquhar	Kawasaki 1000cc	+ 2.594	118.953 mph
5	(England) Gary Johnson	Honda 1000cc	+ 3.092	118.735 mph
6	(Scotland) Keith Amor	Honda 1000cc	+ 3.333	118.630 mph
7	(Republic of Ireland) John Walsh	Yamaha 1000cc	+ 3.550	118.535 mph
8	(Scotland) Les Shand	Yamaha 1000cc	+ 3.896	118.385 mph
9	(Isle of Man) Conor Cummins	Kawasaki 1000cc	+ 4.788	117.999 mph
10	(England) Guy Martin	Honda 1000cc	+ 5.509	117.688 mph

=== Supersport ===
After a decent session with his 250cc bike, Michael Dunlop surprised the rest of the field by setting the fastest lap in the Tuesday Supersport session. His 4:33.664 lap was over a second and a half faster than the next best lap, by Plater on the HM Plant Honda. Amor was third ahead of Anstey, Ian Hutchinson, William Dunlop and McGuinness.

Thursday's session was cancelled due to adverse weather conditions.

Rank	Rider	Team	Time	Speed
1	(Northern Ireland) Michael Dunlop	Yamaha 600cc	4:33.664	117.946 mph
2	(England) Steve Plater	Honda 600cc	+ 1.745	117.199 mph
3	(Scotland) Keith Amor	Honda 600cc	+ 2.914	116.703 mph
4	(New Zealand) Bruce Anstey	Suzuki 600cc	+ 4.521	116.029 mph
5	(England) Ian Hutchinson	Honda 600cc	+ 4.626	115.985 mph
6	(Northern Ireland) William Dunlop	Yamaha 600cc	+ 4.749	115.934 mph
7	(England) John McGuinness	Honda 600cc	+ 5.115	115.782 mph
8	(Republic of Ireland) John Walsh	Yamaha 600cc	+ 7.199	114.923 mph
9	(England) Gary Johnson	Honda 600cc	+ 8.580	114.361 mph
10	(Northern Ireland) Ryan Farquhar	Kawasaki 600cc	+ 9.180	114.118 mph

=== 250cc ===
Sunny conditions marked the start of the 250cc session on Tuesday, in which Christian Elkin topped the timesheets. Elkin's Honda lapped the circuit in a time of 5:02.594, edging out defending race winner Michael Dunlop's Honda by just over a tenth of a second. McGuinness was third, with a lap of 5:05.326, narrowly shading another Honda, ridden by Belfast's Mark Lunney. The first Yamaha rounded out the top five, with David Craig edging out Darren Burns.

Thursday's session was completed before adverse weather conditions curtailed the day. Elkin continued his good form, with a lap of 4:56.654, nearly eight seconds faster than the next competitor. Denver Robb was second, ahead of McGuinness and Phil Harvey. Paul Robinson rounded out the top five on his Honda.

Rank	Rider	Team	Time	Speed
1	(England) Christian Elkin	Honda 250cc	4:56.654	108.806 mph
2	(Northern Ireland) Michael Dunlop	Honda 250cc	+ 6.059	106.628 mph
3	(Northern Ireland) Denver Robb	Honda 250cc	+ 7.850	106.001 mph
4	(England) John McGuinness	Honda 250cc	+ 8.206	105.877 mph
5	(Northern Ireland) Mark Lunney	Honda 250cc	+ 8.719	105.699 mph
6	(England) Phil Harvey	Honda 250cc	+ 8.764	104.824 mph
7	(Northern Ireland) David Craig	Yamaha 250cc	+ 10.219	105.182 mph
8	(Northern Ireland) Darren Burns	Honda 250cc	+ 10.323	105.147 mph
9	(Northern Ireland) Davy Morgan	Honda 250cc	+ 11.669	104.688 mph
10	(Northern Ireland) Barry Davidson	Honda 250cc	+ 11.760	104.657 mph

=== 125cc ===
The only Aprilia in the field topped the Tuesday timesheets, with Ballywalter's David Lemon riding it to a lap of 5:20.756 and the only 100 mph lap of the session. Although, William Dunlop recorded a 100 mph lap, he did not complete enough laps to qualify. Lemon's time was good enough to give him a three-second advantage over Oliver Linsdell's Honda, with Chris Palmer, Paul Robinson and James Ford, all on Hondas, rounding out the top five.

Thursday's session was completed before adverse weather conditions curtailed the day. William Dunlop topped the session, improving on his non-qualifying time from Tuesday, but was still over a second shy from the best time of the week, set by Lemon. Lemon was only fourth in the session, with Palmer and Robinson both slotting in between.

Rank	Rider	Team	Time	Speed
1	(Northern Ireland) David Lemon	Aprilia 125cc	5:20.756	100.630 mph
2	(Northern Ireland) William Dunlop	Honda 125cc	+ 1.205	100.253 mph
3	(England) Chris Palmer	Honda 125cc	+ 2.058	99.988 mph
4	(England) Oliver Linsdell	Honda 125cc	+ 3.104	99.665 mph
5	(Northern Ireland) Paul Robinson	Honda 125cc	+ 4.099	99.360 mph
6	(Northern Ireland) Mark Lunney	Honda 125cc	+ 10.457	97.453 mph
7	(England) James Ford	Honda 125cc	+ 10.993	97.295 mph
8	(England) Jon Vincent	Honda 125cc	+ 14.687	96.224 mph
9	(Northern Ireland) Nigel Moore	Honda 125cc	+ 15.160	96.088 mph
10	(Northern Ireland) Graham Wilson	Honda 125cc	+ 15.366	96.029 mph

== Races ==
=== Race 1; 250cc Race final standings ===
Saturday 16 May 2009 3 laps – 26.79 miles

Rank	Rider	Team	Time	Speed
1	(Northern Ireland) William Dunlop	Honda 250cc	14' 48.194	108.455 mph
2	(England) Chris Palmer	Honda 250cc	+ 6.149	107.709 mph
3	(England) Phil Harvey	Honda 250cc	+ 7.174	107.586 mph
4	(Northern Ireland) Mark Lunney	Honda 250cc	+ 8.400	107.439 mph
5	(Northern Ireland) Denver Robb	Honda 250cc	+ 10.234	107.219 mph
6	(England) John McGuinness	Honda 250cc	+ 14.900	106.665 mph
7	(Northern Ireland) Paul Robinson	Honda 250cc	+ 22.986	105.719 mph
8	(Northern Ireland) Andrew Neill	Honda 250cc	+ 29.812	104.933 mph
9	(Northern Ireland) Barry Davidson	Honda 250cc	+ 37.496	104.062 mph
10	(Northern Ireland) David Mateer	Yamaha 250cc	+ 1 lap	103.344 mph

Fastest Lap: Michael Dunlop, 4'55.591 on lap 2 (109.197 miles per hour (175.736 km/h))

=== Race 2; Superbike Race Race final standings ===
Saturday 16 May 2009 2 laps – 17.862 miles

Rank	Rider	Team	Time	Speed
1	(England) Steve Plater	Honda 1000cc	8' 45.964	121.779 mph
2	(New Zealand) Bruce Anstey	Suzuki 1000cc	+ 0.639	121.631 mph
3	(England) John McGuinness	Honda 1000cc	+ 2.019	121.313 mph
4	(Australia) Cameron Donald	Suzuki 1000cc	+ 2.488	121.205 mph
5	(Isle of Man) Conor Cummins	Kawasaki 1000cc	+ 3.266	121.027 mph
6	(England) Guy Martin	Honda 1000cc	+ 4.516	120.742 mph
7	(Scotland) Keith Amor	Honda 1000cc	+ 5.351	120.552 mph
8	(Northern Ireland) Ryan Farquhar	Kawasaki 1000cc	+ 5.823	120.445 mph
9	(England) Gary Johnson	Honda 1000cc	+ 7.969	119.961 mph
10	(England) Ian Hutchinson	Honda 1000cc	+ 9.515	119.540 mph

Fastest Lap: Steve Plater, 4'22.577 on lap 2 (122.926 miles per hour (197.830 km/h))

=== Race 3; Supersport Race final standings ===
Saturday 16 May 2009 4 laps – 35.725 miles

Rank	Rider	Team	Time	Speed
1	(England) Steve Plater	Honda 600cc	18' 16.091	117.332 mph
2	(New Zealand) Bruce Anstey	Suzuki 600cc	+ 0.515	117.277 mph
3	(Northern Ireland) Michael Dunlop	Yamaha 600cc	+ 2.632	117.051 mph
4	(England) John McGuinness	Honda 600cc	+ 3.144	116.996 mph
5	(Northern Ireland) William Dunlop	Yamaha 600cc	+ 9.420	116.332 mph
6	(England) Ian Hutchinson	Honda 600cc	+ 9.761	116.296 mph
7	(England) Michael Rutter	Yamaha 600cc	+ 10.588	116.209 mph
8	(England) Gary Johnson	Honda 600cc	+ 11.070	116.159 mph
9	(Northern Ireland) Ryan Farquhar	Kawasaki 600cc	+ 17.337	115.505 mph
10	(Wales) Ian Lougher	Yamaha 600cc	+ 28.697	114.338 mph

Fastest Lap: Steve Plater, 4' 33.126 on lap 2 (118.178 miles per hour (190.189 km/h))

=== Race 4; 125cc Race final standings ===
Saturday 16 May 2009 4 laps – 35.864 miles

Rank	Rider	Team	Time	Speed
1	(Northern Ireland) William Dunlop	Honda 125cc	21' 26.004	100.005 mph
2	(England) Chris Palmer	Honda 125cc	+ 7.243	99.445 mph
3	(England) Oliver Linsdell	Honda 125cc	+ 12.846	99.016 mph
4	(Northern Ireland) Mark Lunney	Honda 125cc	+ 26.632	97.976 mph
5	(Netherlands) Stephan Savelkouls	Honda 125cc	+ 28.534	97.799 mph
6	(England) James Ford	Honda 125cc	+ 29.009	97.779 mph
7	(England) Jon Vincent	Honda 125cc	+ 41.470	96.881 mph
8	(England) Phil Harvey	Honda 125cc	+ 57.258	95.742 mph
9	(Northern Ireland) Andrew Neill	Honda 125cc	+ 57.376	95.733 mph
10	(Northern Ireland) Graham Wilson	Honda 125cc	+ 1' 00.132	95.537 mph

Fastest Lap: William Dunlop, 5' 18.482 on lap 2 (101.348 miles per hour (163.104 km/h))

=== Race 5; Superstock Race final standings ===
Saturday 16 May 2009 2 laps – 17.862 miles

Rank	Rider	Team	Time	Speed
1	(Northern Ireland) Alastair Seeley	Suzuki 1000cc	8' 50.296	120.784 mph
2	(Northern Ireland) Ryan Farquhar	Kawasaki 1000cc	+ 0.899	120.579 mph
3	(Scotland) Keith Amor	Honda 1000cc	+ 3.802	119.924 mph
4	(Australia) Cameron Donald	Suzuki 1000cc	+ 4.242	119.825 mph
5	(England) Guy Martin	Honda 1000cc	+ 5.133	119.626 mph
6	(England) Ian Hutchinson	Honda 1000cc	+ 5.717	119.496 mph
7	(Isle of Man) Conor Cummins	Kawasaki 1000cc	+ 5.984	119.436 mph
8	(Scotland) Les Shand	Yamaha 1000cc	+ 6.722	119.272 mph
9	(England) Gary Johnson	Honda 1000cc	+ 11.226	118.280 mph
10	(Northern Ireland) James McBride	Honda 1000cc	+ 20.942	116.195 mph

Fastest Lap: Alastair Seeley, 4' 27.40 on lap 2 (120.872 miles per hour (194.525 km/h))

== Notes ==
- The final two races of the day were cancelled due to adverse weather conditions.
- There were a number of serious crashes during the week. Firstly, during the Supersport session on Tuesday, John Anderton fell off his bike at around 120 mph at Station Corner, and suffered leg and head injuries. During a restart of the opening race of Saturday, Christian Elkin crashed out while battling Michael Dunlop for the lead. Both riders fell and Dunlop ploughed into the Macclesfield rider. Elkin suffered a broken leg in the incident. In the original start of that particular race, Cookstown's Mark Young fell off at Mather's Cross, the infamous corner that killed Robert Dunlop at the 2008 North West 200 Races. Young was taken to hospital with internal injuries, Sadly, he would succumb to his injuries to become the fourteenth fatality in the history of the North West 200. An inquiry into the accident is under way.

== See also ==
- North West 200 – History and results from the event
