= 2011 North West 200 Races =

(United Kingdom) 2011 North West 200 Races
Race details
Date	21 May 2011
Location	Northern Ireland
Course	Road Course; 8.970 mi (14.436 km)

Supersport Race 1
Pole Position	Fastest Lap
(Northern Ireland) Alastair Seeley	(Northern Ireland) Alastair Seeley
115.937 mph	109.155 mph
Podium
1. (Northern Ireland) Alastair Seeley
2. (Australia) Cameron Donald	3. (New Zealand) Bruce Anstey

The 2011 Relentless International North West 200 was the 72nd running of the road racing event and took place on Saturday 21 May 2011 at the circuit, known as "The Triangle", based around the towns of Portstewart, Coleraine and Portrush, in Northern Ireland. As with 2010, the event featured daytime practice on the Thursday rather than during the evening. Traditionally only the main NW200 race has been run over six laps, however in 2011 all five events were to be six lap races. For the first time since 1989 there was no scheduled 125 cc event.

There were significant delays due to a hoax bomb alert and then an extensive oil spill on the track together with bad weather caused racing to be cancelled after the completion of only one race.

== Results ==
The first race of the day was a switch from the Superbikes to the less powerful Supersports due to wet conditions. The race was also reduced from six to five laps with two sighting laps. The race was won by Alastair Seeley after a last lap battle with Cameron Donald. The paddock was evacuated after the race because of a bomb hoax. The second delayed race of the day was for the Superbike race. However, due to deteriorated conditions a number of riders, including the pole sitter Michael Rutter, decided not to take part. Seeley was leading Michael Dunlop when the race was stopped after one lap due to an oil spill. The event was abandoned at 17:20 BST.

=== Practice ===
==== Practice Times & Leaderboard Race 2 & 5 – 1000cc Superbike class ====
Rank	Rider	Tue 17 May	Thurs 19 May
1	(England) Michael Rutter; 1000cc Ducati	4' 32.096; 118.679 mph	4' 26.336; 121.245 mph
2	(England) Martin Jessopp; 1000cc Ducati	4' 36.121; 111.245 mph	4' 26.906; 120.986 mph
3	(Northern Ireland) Michael Dunlop; 1000cc Kawasaki	4' 32.096; 118.679 mph	4' 40.707; 115.308 mph
4	(England) Guy Martin; 1000cc Suzuki	4' 40.279; 115.214 mph	4' 29.083; 120.008 mph
5	(Australia) Cameron Donald; 1000cc Honda	4' 47.144; 112.459 mph	4' 29.227; 119.943 mph
6	(England) Gary Johnson; 1000cc Honda	4' 37.336; 116.436 mph	4' 30.420; 119.414 mph
7	(New Zealand) Bruce Anstey; 1000cc Honda	4' 43.498; 113.906 mph	4' 31.582; 118.903 mph
8	(Northern Ireland) William Dunlop; 1000cc Honda	4' 40.424; 115.154 mph	4' 32.710; 115.154 mph
9	(England) Simon Andrews; 1000cc BMW	5' 24.135; 99.625 mph	4' 32.802; 118.372 mph
10	(England) James Hillier; 1000cc Kawasaki	4' 57.634; 108.496 mph	4' 33.699; 117.984 mph

=== Race results ===
==== Race 1; 600cc Supersport Race final standings ====
Saturday 21 May 2011 5 laps – 44.71 miles

Rank	Rider	Team	Time	Speed
1	(Northern Ireland) Alastair Seeley	Suzuki 600cc	24' 50.702	107.973 mph
2	(Australia) Cameron Donald	Honda 600cc	+ 0.844	109.061 mph
3	(New Zealand) Bruce Anstey	Honda 600cc	+ 14.081	106.963 mph
4	(Northern Ireland) Michael Dunlop	Yamaha 600cc	+ 23.104	106.325 mph
5	(England) Gary Johnson	Yamaha 600cc	+ 25.227	106.176 mph
6	(Northern Ireland) William Dunlop	Honda 600cc	+ 28.845	105.924 mph
7	(Northern Ireland) Ryan Farquhar	Kawasaki 600cc	+ 42.558	104.976 mph
8	(England) Guy Martin	Suzuki 600cc	+ 58.777	103.877 mph
9	(Northern Ireland) Lee Johnston	Honda 600cc	+ 58.891	103.870 mph
10	(Isle of Man) Conor Cummins	Yamaha 600cc	+ 59.185	103.850 mph

Fastest Lap: Alastair Seeley – Suzuki, 4 minutes, 55.835 seconds 109.155 mph on lap 5

== See also ==
- North West 200 – History and results from the event
