= 2012 North West 200 Races =

(United Kingdom) 2012 North West 200 Races
Race details
Date	13–19 May 2012
Location	Northern Ireland
Course	Road Course; 8.970 mi (14.436 km)

The 2012 Relentless International North West 200 was the 73rd running of the motorcycle road racing event which took place between 13 and 19 May 2012 at the circuit, known as "The Triangle", based around the towns of Portstewart, Coleraine and Portrush, in Northern Ireland. All practice sessions took place during the day and the event was extended to include races on the Thursday evening.

The Northern Ireland First Minister, Peter Robinson, and Minister for Tourism, Arlene Foster joined Technical Director Mervyn Whyte along with many top riders at the launch of the event. Thursday night also included two races for the first time: a Superstock and newly introduced Supertwin race. Saturday saw a total of five races and all races except the Supertwin was held over six laps.

BBC Northern Ireland continued as the official media partner of the event and provided extensive coverage to the North West 200 across all three platforms: on-line, television and radio.

== Results ==
=== Practice ===
During practice on Tuesday Alastair Seeley set the fastest times in both the Superbike and Supersport classes. Also during Tuesday practice session Martin Jessopp set a new fastest speed trap record of 208 mph (335 km/h).

=== Race results ===
==== Race 1; 1000cc Superstock Race final standings ====
Thursday 17 May 2012 6 laps – 53.656 miles

Rank	Rider	Team	Time	Speed
1	(Northern Ireland) Alastair Seeley	Suzuki 1000cc	29' 00.810	111.010 mph
2	(Northern Ireland) Lee Johnson	Ducati 1000cc	+ 22.511	109.593 mph
3	(Australia) Cameron Donald	Honda 1000cc	+ 24.226	106.487 mph
4	(Northern Ireland) Ryan Farquhar	Kawasaki 1000cc	+ 24.311	109.481 mph
5	(Italy) Stefano Bonetti	Kawasaki 1000 cc	+ 24.677	109.459 mph
6	(England) James Hillier	Kawasaki 1000cc	+ 35.386	108.799 mph
7	(England) Michael Rutter	Kawasaki 1000cc	+ 35.852	108.770 mph
8	(Northern Ireland) Michael Dunlop	Kawasaki 1000cc	+ 39.097	108.572 mph
9	(England) Guy Martin	Suzuki 1000cc	+ 45.679	108.172 mph
10	(Wales) Ian Lougher	Kawasaki 1000cc	+ 47.923	108.036 mph

Fastest Lap: Alastair Seeley – Suzuki, 4 minutes, 49.008 seconds; 111.734 mph (179.818 km/h) on lap 6

==== Race 2; 650cc Supertwins Race final standings ====
Thursday 17 May 2012 4 laps – 35.724 miles

Rank	Rider	Team	Time	Speed
1	(Northern Ireland) Ryan Farquhar	Kawasaki 650cc	21' 23.294	100.261 mph
2	(Northern Ireland) Jeremy McWilliams	Kawasaki 650cc	+ 2.940	100.032 mph
3	(England) Michael Rutter	Kawasaki 650cc	+ 3.554	99.984 mph
4	(England) James Hillier	Kawasaki 650cc	+ 4.270	99.928 mph
5	(Northern Ireland) Adrian Archibald	Kawasaki 650 cc	+ 4.568	99.905 mph
6	(Northern Ireland) James Hamilton	Kawasaki 650cc	+ 32.497	97.785 mph
7	(Wales) Ian Lougher	Kawasaki 650cc	+ 33.181	97.734 mph
8	(Republic of Ireland) Michael Sweeney	Suzuki 650cc	+ 34.351	97.647 mph
9	(Northern Ireland) William Davison	Kawasaki 650cc	+ 34.463	97.639 mph
10	(England) Simon Andrews	Kawasaki 1000cc	+ 37.454	97.418 mph

Fastest Lap: Ryan Farquhar – Kawasaki, 5 minutes, 21.356 seconds; 100.487 mph (161.718 km/h) on lap 2

==== Race 3; 600cc Supersport Race final standings ====
Saturday 19 May 2012 4 laps – 35.724 miles

Rank	Rider	Team	Time	Speed
1	(Northern Ireland) William Dunlop	Honda 600cc	18' 36.494	115.239 mph
2	(Northern Ireland) Alastair Seeley	Suzuki 600cc	+ 2.660	114.965 mph
3	(England) John McGuinness	Honda 600cc	+ 3.774	114.851 mph
4	(Australia) Cameron Donald	Honda 600cc	+ 9.050	114.313 mph
5	(England) Gary Johnson	Honda 600cc	+ 9.940	114.222 mph
6	(Northern Ireland) Michael Dunlop	Suzuki 600cc	+ 18.861	113.525 mph
7	(New Zealand) Bruce Anstey	Honda 600cc	+ 23.679	112.846 mph
8	(Isle of Man) Dan Kneen	Suzuki 600cc	+ 41.489	111.110 mph
9	(England) Ben Wylie	Yamaha 600cc	+ 42.182	111.044 mph
10	(England) Ian Hutchinson	Yamaha 600cc	+ 42.360	111.027 mph

Fastest Lap: William Dunlop – Honda, 4 minutes, 39.142 seconds; 115.683 mph (186.174 km/h) on lap 3

==== Race 4; 1000cc Superbike (I) Race final standings ====
Saturday 19 May 2012 6 laps – 53.656 miles

Rank	Rider	Team	Time	Speed
1	(England) John McGuinness	Honda 1000cc	26' 51.976	119.883 mph
2	(Northern Ireland) Alastair Seeley	Suzuki 1000cc	+ 4.202	119.571 mph
3	(Australia) Cameron Donald	Honda 1000cc	+ 12.038	118.994 mph
4	(England) Michael Rutter	Kawasaki 1000cc	+ 12.836	118.936 mph
5	(Northern Ireland) Ryan Farquhar	Kawasaki 1000 cc	+ 13.920	118.856 mph
6	(New Zealand) Bruce Anstey	Honda 1000cc	+ 15.345	118.752 mph
7	(Isle of Man) Conor Cummins	Suzuki 1000cc	+ 19.533	118.447 mph
8	(England) James Hillier	Kawasaki 1000cc	+ 20.577	118.372 mph
9	(England) Simon Andrews	Honda 1000cc	+ 23.429	118.165 mph
10	(Northern Ireland) Michael Dunlop	Honda 1000cc	+ 26.485	117.945 mph

Fastest Lap: Alastair Seeley – Suzuki, 4 minutes, 25.570 seconds; 121.595 mph (195.688 km/h) on lap 4

== See also ==
- North West 200 - History and results from the event
