= 2020 North West 200 Races =

Race details
Date	10–16 May 2020 (original schedule)
Location	Northern Ireland
Course	Road Course; 8.970 mi (14.436 km)

The 2020 International North West 200 is a motorcycle road racing event which was originally scheduled to take place between 10 and 16 May 2020 at the circuit, known as "The Triangle", based around the towns of Portstewart, Coleraine and Portrush, in Northern Ireland.

On 17 March the organisers postponed the event due to the COVID-19 pandemic in Northern Ireland with a view to looking at a new date during the 2020 racing calendar. The meeting was cancelled on 11 May 2020.

== See also ==
- North West 200 - History and results from the event
