= 2026 North West 200 Races =

(United Kingdom) 2026 North West 200 Races
Race details
Date	6-9 May 2025
Location	Northern Ireland
Course	Road Course 8.970 mi (14.436 km)

2026 International North West 200 was the 87th running of the motorcycle road racing event which took place between 6–9 May 2026 at the circuit, known as "The Triangle", based around the towns of Portstewart, Coleraine and Portrush, in Northern Ireland.

== Results ==
Following the death of Czech rider Kamil Holan in the Superbike qualifying session, Thursday races were cancelled.

=== Race 1; 650cc Supertwin Race 1 final standings ===
Saturday 9 May 2026 4 laps – 35.724 miles

Rank	Rider	Team	Time	Speed
1	(England) Peter Hickman	Yamaha	19' 23.691	110.565 mph
2	(Northern Ireland) Jeremy McWilliams	Yamaha	+ 0.460	110.522 mph
3	(Northern Ireland) Alastair Seeley	Aprilia	+ 0.623	110.506 mph
4	(Northern Ireland) Paul Jordan	Aprilia	+ 0.938	110.476 mph
5	(England) Jamie Coward	Paton	+ 9.938	109.629 mph
6	(England) Christian Elkin	Aprilia	+ 10.435	109.583 mph
7	(South Africa) Allann Venter	Aprilia	+ 22.532	108.465 mph
8	(Republic of Ireland) Michael Sweeney	Aprilia	+ 26.918	108.066 mph
9	(England) Franco Bourne	Paton	+ 29.626	107.820 mph
10	(Switzerland) Mauro Poncini	Aprilia	+ 29.755	107.809 mph

Fastest Lap: Paul Jordan – Aprilia, 4 minutes, 47.728 seconds; 112.231 mph (180.618 km/h) on lap 3

=== Race 2; 1000cc Superbike Race 2 final standings ===
Saturday 9 May 2026 6 laps – 53.656 miles

Rank	Rider	Team	Time	Speed
1	(Northern Ireland) Glenn Irwin	Ducati	25' 54.332	124.329 mph
2	(England) Dean Harrison	Honda	+ 0.181	124.314 mph
3	(Northern Ireland) Michael Dunlop	Honda	+ 14.571	123.174 mph
4	(England) Peter Hickman	BMW	+ 15.027	123.138 mph
5	(Australia) Josh Brookes	Honda	+ 15.622	123.092 mph
6	(England) Ian Hutchinson	BMW	+ 21.038	122.668 mph
7	(England) Storm Stacey	Ducati	+ 40.199	121.194 mph
8	(England) John McGuinness	Honda	+ 41.434	121.100 mph
9	(Republic of Ireland) Mike Browne	Honda	+ 1' 02.688	119.509 mph
10	(Republic of Ireland) Michael Sweeney	BMW	+ 1' 02.825	119.499 mph

Fastest Lap: Glenn Irwin – Ducati, 4 minutes, 18.343 seconds; 124.997 mph (201.163 km/h) on lap 3

=== Race 3; 600cc Supersport Race 2 final standings ===
Saturday 9 May 2026 6 laps – 53.656 miles (Note: Red flag after 4 laps - result declared)

Rank	Rider	Team	Time	Speed
1	(Northern Ireland) Michael Dunlop	Ducati	18' 10.887	117.944 mph
2	(England) Dean Harrison	Honda	+ 0.292	117.913 mph
3	(Australia) Josh Brookes	Suzuki	+ 8.252	117.059 mph
4	(Northern Ireland) Alastair Seeley	Ducati	+ 8.724	117.009 mph
5	(Northern Ireland) Carl Phillips	Ducati	+ 31.817	114.602 mph
6	(New Zealand) Mitch Rees	Honda	+ 37.780	113.996 mph
7	(Republic of Ireland) Mike Browne	Yamaha	+ 37.869	113.987 mph
8	(England) Dominic Herbertson	Triumph	+ 38.591	113.915 mph
9	(France) Pierre Yves Bian	Triumph	+ 40.165	113.756 mph
10	(Isle of Man) Michael Evans	Triumph	+ 41.936	113.578 mph

Fastest Lap: Dean Harrison – Honda, 4 minutes, 31.938 seconds; 118.748 mph (191.106 km/h) on lap 4

=== Race 4; 1000cc Superstock Race 2 final standings ===
Saturday 9 May 2026 4 laps – 35.724 miles

Rank	Rider	Team	Time	Speed
1	(England) Storm Stacey	BMW	17' 21.681	123.516 mph
2	(Northern Ireland) Michael Dunlop	BMW	+ 1.260	123.367 mph
3	(Australia) Josh Brookes	Honda	+ 1.499	123.338 mph
4	(England) Ian Hutchinson	BMW	+ 15.896	121.659 mph
5	(England) John McGuinness	Honda	+ 16.102	121.636 mph
6	(Republic of Ireland) Mike Browne	Honda	+ 23.457	120.796 mph
7	(England) Dominic Herbertson	BMW	+ 31.696	119.868 mph
8	(England) Peter Hickman	BMW	+ 37.299	119.246 mph
9	(Isle of Man) Marcus Simpson	Honda	+ 38.836	119.076 mph
10	(New Zealand) Mitch Rees	Honda	+ 39.756	118.975 mph

Fastest Lap: Storm Stacey – BMW, 4 minutes, 19.378 seconds; 124.498 mph (200.360 km/h) on lap 4

=== Race 5; 650cc Supertwin Race 2 final standings ===
Saturday 9 May 2026 4 laps – 35.724 miles

Rank	Rider	Team	Time	Speed
1	(Northern Ireland) Jeremy McWilliams	Yamaha	19' 16.999	111.205 mph
2	(Northern Ireland) Paul Jordan	Aprilia	+ 5.805	110.650 mph
3	(Northern Ireland) Alastair Seeley	Aprilia	+ 11.109	110.147 mph
4	(England) Jamie Coward	Paton	+ 12.556	110.011 mph
5	(England) Franco Bourne	Paton	+ 18.774	109.429 mph
6	(England) Christian Elkin	Aprilia	+ 19.271	109.383 mph
7	(South Africa) Allann Venter	Aprilia	+ 21.800	109.148 mph
8	(England) Joey Thompson	Aprilia	+ 30.997	108.303 mph
9	(Italy) Andrea MAJOLA	Paton	+ 34.260	108.007 mph
10	(England) Dominic Herbertson	Triumph	+ 34.666	107.970 mph

Fastest Lap: Paul Jordan – Aprilia, 4 minutes, 47.420 seconds; 112.351 mph (180.811 km/h) on lap 2

=== Race 6; NW200 1000cc Superbike final standings ===
Saturday 9 May 2026 6 laps – 53.656 miles (Note: Red flag after 3 laps - result declared)

Rank	Rider	Team	Time	Speed
1	(England) Storm Stacey	BMW	13' 01.756	123.276 mph
2	(England) Dean Harrison	Honda	+ 0.667	123.171 mph
3	(Northern Ireland) Glenn Irwin	Ducati	+ 1.146	123.096 mph
4	(England) Peter Hickman	BMW	+ 1.647	123.017 mph
5	(Australia) Josh Brookes	Honda	+ 1.937	122.972 mph
6	(England) Ian Hutchinson	BMW	+ 8.369	121.971 mph
7	(England) John McGuinness	Honda	+ 16.342	120.752 mph
8	(Republic of Ireland) Mike Browne	Honda	+ 21.841	119.926 mph
9	(Northern Ireland) Carl Phillips	BMW	+ 23.038	119.747 mph
10	(Isle of Man) Michael Evans	Honda	+ 30.358	118.668 mph

Fastest Lap: Peter Hickman – BMW, 4 minutes, 20.823 seconds; 123.808 mph (199.250 km/h) on lap 2

== See also ==
- North West 200 – History and results from the event
