= 2008 North West 200 Races =

The 2008 North West 200 took place on Saturday 17 May at the 8.966 mile circuit, dubbed "The Triangle", based around the towns of Coleraine, Portrush and Portstewart, in Northern Ireland. The meeting was overshadowed by the death of Northern Irish rider Robert Dunlop, the record-holder for wins at the circuit, who was killed in a practice crash on 15 May. The 47-year-old had been travelling in a group of three riders at the Mather's Cross section of the course, when his bike seized at 160 mph. He would later succumb to his injuries in a Coleraine hospital. Robert's sons Michael and William continued to race at the meeting, with Michael winning the 250cc race.

== Practice ==
John McGuinness dominated qualifying for the 250cc race, the first to be contested on race day. McGuinness went round the 8.966 mile circuit in a time of 4'57.791, the only rider to break five minutes and qualified on pole by over 3 seconds from the Hondas of Michael Dunlop and Paul Robinson. Hondas took the first eight places on the grid, with Henrik Voit's Aprilia the best non-Honda in ninth. McGuinness also dominated Superbike practice, being fastest both on Tuesday and on Thursday. Having achieved a 4'25.377 on Tuesday, he lowered that mark by over 3 seconds to a 4'22.342 on Thursday. Michael Rutter on the NW200-backed Ducati qualified 2nd on a 4'22.999, with the rest in the 4'24s or higher. This session sets the grid for both Superbike races. Steve Plater qualified on pole for the Supersport races, recording a lap of 4'33.749 on Thursday to put him half a second clear of Alastair Seeley, who qualified second, with Keith Amor qualifying 3rd, to give three different nations placed in the top three places. Amor would go two places better in the qualifying session for the Superstock race. In the fourth session, he set a time of 4'26.446, which would give him the pole by over 1.5 seconds. Seeley was second with his time of 4'28.029 coming in session three and Rutter was third, with a 4'28.138 set in session four. Michael Wilcox was the clear pacesetter in the 125cc qualifying, setting a pole lap of 5'17.528 and was on top by nearly three seconds from the Aprilia of David Lemon with the Hondas of Mark Curtin, Michael Dunlop and Chris Palmer rounding out the top five. Leo Aldersley's Yamaha was fastest in the 400cc session, which occurred at the same time as the 125cc session as those two races are contested in the one race, albeit separated on track. His 5'15.329 was almost three seconds faster than second placed qualifier and fellow Yamaha rider, Oliver Linsdell. Les Shand's Kawasaki was third, with the best Honda belonging to Manxman David Madsen-Mygdal lining up fourth.

== Races ==
=== Race 1; 250cc Race final standings ===
Saturday 17 May 2008 4 laps – 35.724 miles

Rank	Rider	Team	Time	Speed
1	(Northern Ireland) Michael Dunlop	Honda 250cc	19' 34.316	109.516 mph
2	(England) Christian Elkin	Honda 250cc	+ 1.029	109.420 mph
3	(England) John McGuinness	Honda 250cc	+ 1.763	109.352 mph
4	(Northern Ireland) Paul Robinson	Honda 250cc	+ 22.725	107.437 mph
5	(Northern Ireland) Andrew Neill	Honda 250cc	+ 24.543	107.274 mph
6	(Northern Ireland) Davy Morgan	Honda 250cc	+ 24.614	107.268 mph
7	(Northern Ireland) Denver Robb	Honda 250cc	+ 39.308	105.969 mph
8	(Northern Ireland) Mark Lunney	Honda 250cc	+ 42.014	105.733 mph
9	(Republic of Ireland) Emlyn Hughes	Honda 250cc	+ 42.504	105.961 mph
10	(England) Neil Richardson	Yamaha 250cc	+ 44.434	105.531 mph

Fastest Lap: Michael Dunlop, 4'51.975 on lap 4 (110.549 mph; 177.911 km/h)

=== Race 2; 1000cc Superbike Race final standings ===
Saturday 17 May 2008 *5 laps – 44.690 miles

Rank	Rider	Team	Time	Speed
1	(England) Michael Rutter	Ducati	21' 52.169	122.609 mph
2	(England) Guy Martin	Honda	+ 0.810	122.534 mph
3	(England) John McGuinness	Honda	+ 0.956	122.510 mph
4	(England) Steve Plater	Yamaha YZF-R	+ 1.192	121.658 mph
5	(England) Gary Johnson	Honda	+ 10.257	120.979 mph
6	(New Zealand) Bruce Anstey	Suzuki GSX-R1000	+ 17.682	120.979 mph
7	(England) Ian Hutchinson	Yamaha	+ 17.970	120.953 mph
8	(Northern Ireland) Ryan Farquhar	Kawasaki ZX-10R	+ 18.386	120.915 mph
9	(Northern Ireland) Denver Robb	Suzuki	+ 27.118	120.127 mph
10	(Scotland) Keith Amor	Honda	+ 41.841	118.820 mph

Fastest Lap: Michael Rutter, 4'20.729 on lap 5 (123.798 mph; 199.234 km/h)

=== Race 3; Supersport Race final standings ===
Saturday 17 May 2008 5 laps – 44.690 miles

Rank	Rider	Team	Time	Gap
1	(England) Steve Plater	Yamaha YZF-R6	22'46.632	
2	(Northern Ireland) Alastair Seeley	Yamaha	22'49.619	+ 2.987
3	(Wales) Ian Lougher	Yamaha	22'50.366	+ 3.734
4	(England) Ian Hutchinson	Yamaha	22'50.813	+ 4.181
5	(Northern Ireland) Ryan Farquhar	Kawasaki	22'51.092	+ 4.460
6	(Scotland) Keith Amor	Honda	22'51.288	+ 4.656
7	(England) Guy Martin	Honda	22'51.866	+ 5.234
8	(England) Gary Johnson	Honda	22'52.396	+ 5.764
9	(England) John McGuinness	Honda	22'54.799	+ 8.167
10	(Isle of Man) Conor Cummins	Yamaha	22'55.173	+ 8.541

Fastest Lap and New Lap Record: Steve Plater, 4'30.792 on lap 5 (119.197 mph; 191.829 km/h)

=== Race 4; 125cc Race final standings ===
Saturday 17 May 2008 4 laps – 35.724 miles

Rank	Rider	Team	Time	Gap
1	(England) Michael Wilcox	Honda	21'10.496	
2	(England) Chris Palmer	Honda	21'10.673	+ 0.177
3	(England) James Ford	Honda	21'20.006	+ 9.510
4	(Northern Ireland) Mark Lunney	Honda	21'23.032	+ 12.536
5	(Republic of Ireland) Mark Curtin	Honda	21'23.596	+ 13.100
6	(Northern Ireland) Graham Wilson	Honda	21'24.652	+ 14.156
7	(Netherlands) Stephan Savelkouls	Honda	21'47.464	+ 36.968
8	(Northern Ireland) David Ferguson	Honda	21'50.154	+ 39.658
9	(Northern Ireland) Tim Stott	Honda	21'50.437	+ 39.941
10	(Northern Ireland) Nigel Moore	Honda	21'50.668	+ 40.172

Fastest Lap: Chris Palmer, 5'16.672 on lap 4 (101.928 mph; 164.037 km/h)

=== Race 5; 400cc Race final standings ===
Saturday 17 May 2008 4 laps – 35.724 miles

Rank	Rider	Team	Time	Gap
1	(England) Oliver Linsdell	Yamaha	20'38.949	
2	(New Zealand) Paul Dobbs	Yamaha	21'03.441	+ 24.492
3	(Scotland) Les Shand	Kawasaki	21'04.150	+ 25.201
4	(Northern Ireland) Joe Phillips	Kawasaki	21'04.319	+ 25.370
5	(England) John Barton	Kawasaki	21'05.398	+ 26.449
6	(Northern Ireland) Alan Brown	Suzuki	21'10.235	+ 31.286
7	(Isle of Man) David Madsen-Mygdal	Honda	21'13.993	+ 35.044
8	(Republic of Ireland) Michael Sweeney	Honda	21'17.834	+ 38.885
9	(Northern Ireland) Coyles Wright	Suzuki	21'29.098	+ 50.149
10	(England) Ian Whitlow	Suzuki	21'55.007	+ 1'16.058

Fastest Lap and New Lap Record: Oliver Linsdell, 5'06.838 on lap 3 (105.194 mph; 169.293 km/h)

=== Race 6; 1000cc Superstock Race final standings ===
Saturday 17 May 2008 5 laps – 44.690 miles

Rank	Rider	Team	Time	Gap
1	(Northern Ireland) Alastair Seeley	Yamaha	22'08.828	
2	(New Zealand) Bruce Anstey	Suzuki	22'09.363	+ 0.535
3	(Australia) Cameron Donald	Suzuki	22'09.583	+ 0.755
4	(England) Guy Martin	Honda	22'10.136	+ 1.308
5	(Scotland) Keith Amor	Honda	22'10.269	+ 1.441
6	(Northern Ireland) Ryan Farquhar	Kawasaki	22'11.671	+ 2.843
7	(England) Gary Johnson	Honda	22'16.745	+ 7.917
8	(Isle of Man) Conor Cummins	Yamaha	22'23.426	+ 14.598
9	(England) Rob Frost	Yamaha	22'29.852	+ 21.024
10	(Scotland) Les Shand	Yamaha	22'30.633	+ 21.805

Fastest Lap and New Lap Record: Guy Martin, 4'24.682 on lap 3 (121.949 mph; 196.258 km/h)

=== Race 7; North West 200 Superbike Race ===
Saturday 17 May 2008 6 laps – 53.656 miles

Rank	Rider	Team	Time	Gap
1	(England) Steve Plater	Yamaha	26'17.157	
2	(Australia) Cameron Donald	Suzuki	26'17.744	+ 0.587
3	(England) Michael Rutter	Ducati	26'18.495	+ 1.338
4	(New Zealand) Bruce Anstey	Suzuki	26'18.692	+ 1.535
5	(England) John McGuinness	Honda	26'18.915	+ 1.758
6	(England) Gary Johnson	Honda	26'20.874	+ 3.717
7	(Scotland) Keith Amor	Honda	26'30.113	+ 12.956
8	(England) Ian Hutchinson	Yamaha	26'31.163	+ 14.006
9	(Northern Ireland) Ryan Farquhar	Kawasaki	26'50.132	+ 32.975
10	(Northern Ireland) Denver Robb	Suzuki	26'51.260	+ 34.103

Fastest Lap: John McGuinness (lap 5) and Steve Plater (lap 6), 4'21.686 (123.345 mph; 198.505 km/h)

=== Race 8; Supersport Race ===
Saturday 17 May 2008 5 laps – 44.690 miles

Rank	Rider	Team	Time	Gap
1	(England) Steve Plater	Yamaha	22'41.258	
2	(Northern Ireland) Alastair Seeley	Yamaha	22'41.391	+ 0.133
3	(Wales) Ian Lougher	Yamaha	22'43.218	+ 1.960
4	(England) Steve Brogan	Honda	22'46.694	+ 5.436
5	(Scotland) Keith Amor	Honda	22'46.795	+ 5.537
6	(England) Gary Johnson	Honda	23'02.936	+ 21.678
7	(Australia) Cameron Donald	Suzuki	23'03.409	+ 22.151
8	(England) John McGuinness	Honda	23'06.462	+ 25.204
9	(Scotland) Les Shand	Suzuki	23'28.676	+ 47.418
10	(England) James McBride	Yamaha	23'32.998	+ 51.740

Fastest Lap: Keith Amor, 4'31.745 on lap 4 (118.779 mph; 191.156 km/h)
