= 2025 North West 200 Races =

(United Kingdom) 2025 North West 200 Races
Race details
Date	7-10 May 2025
Location	Northern Ireland
Course	Road Course 8.970 mi (14.436 km)

2025 International North West 200 was the 86th running of the motorcycle road racing event which took place between 7–10 May 2025 at the circuit, known as "The Triangle", based around the towns of Portstewart, Coleraine and Portrush, in Northern Ireland.

== Results ==
=== Race results ===
==== Race 1; 1000cc Superbike Race 1 final standings ====
Thursday 8 May 2025 4 laps – 35.724 miles

Rank	Rider	Team	Time	Speed
1	(England) Davey Todd	BMW	17' 20.056	123.867 mph
2	(England) Dean Harrison	Honda	+ 0.215	123.683 mph
3	(England) Peter Hickman	BMW	+ 1.639	123.514 mph
4	(Northern Ireland) Michael Dunlop	BMW	+ 2.135	123.455 mph
5	(England) Ian Hutchinson	BMW	+ 22.812	121.054 mph
6	(England) Jamie Coward	BMW	+ 24.353	120.878 mph
7	(Finland) Erno Kostamo	BMW	+ 24.677	120.842 mph
8	(England) John McGuinness	Honda	+ 36.163	119.552 mph
9	(Northern Ireland) Paul Jordan	Honda	+ 36.929	119.467 mph
10	(Republic of Ireland) Michael Sweeney	BMW	+ 38.398	119.304 mph

Fastest Lap: Dean Harrison – Honda, 4 minutes, 20.158 seconds; 124.125 mph (199.760 km/h) on lap 2

==== Race 2; 600cc Supersport Race 1 final standings ====
Thursday 8 May 2025 4 laps – 35.724 miles

Rank	Rider	Team	Time	Speed
1	(Northern Ireland) Michael Dunlop	Ducati	18' 18.335	117.145 mph
2	(England) Richard Cooper	Yamaha	+ 0.378	117.104 mph
3	(England) Davey Todd	Honda	+ 0.499	117.091 mph
4	(England) Dean Harrison	Honda	+ 1.046	117.033 mph
5	(England) Peter Hickman	Triumph	+ 4.014	116.718 mph
6	(England) Jamie Coward	Triumph	+ 4.328	116.685 mph
7	(Republic of Ireland) Mike Browne	Yamaha	+ 12.745	115.801 mph
8	(Northern Ireland) Adam McLean	Yamaha	+ 13.304	115.743 mph
9	(Northern Ireland) Alastair Seeley	Kawasaki	+ 14.113	115.658 mph
10	(Northern Ireland) Paul Jordan	Honda	+ 15.649	115.499 mph

Fastest Lap: Michael Dunlop – Ducati, 4 minutes, 32.162 seconds; 118.650 mph (190.949 km/h) on lap 4

==== Race 3; 1000cc Superstock Race 1 final standings ====
Thursday 8 May 2025 4 laps – 35.724 miles

Rank	Rider	Team	Time	Speed
1	(Northern Ireland) Michael Dunlop	BMW	17' 22.763	123.388 mph
2	(England) Dean Harrison	Honda	+ 2.659	123.074 mph
3	(England) Ian Hutchinson	BMW	+ 8.474	122.393 mph
4	(England) Davey Todd	BMW	+ 13.412	121.821 mph
5	(England) Peter Hickman	BMW	+ 21.225	120.926 mph
6	(Australia) Josh Brookes	Honda	+ 22.711	120.758 mph
7	(Isle of Man) Conor Cummins	BMW	+ 27.518	120.215 mph
8	(Isle of Man) Michael Evans	Honda	+ 28.235	120.135 mph
9	(England) John McGuinness	Honda	+ 30.384	119.894 mph
10	(Northern Ireland) Paul Jordan	Honda	+ 30.550	119.876 mph

Fastest Lap: Michael Dunlop – BMW, 4 minutes, 19.598 seconds; 124.392 mph (200.190 km/h) on lap 4

==== Race 4; 650cc Supertwin Race 1 final standings ====
Saturday 10 May 2025 4 laps – 35.724 miles

Rank	Rider	Team	Time	Speed
1	(England) Richard Cooper	Kawasaki	19' 25.817	110.364 mph
2	(Northern Ireland) Adam McLean	Yamaha	+ 0.280	110.337 mph
3	(Northern Ireland) Jeremy McWilliams	Aprilia	+ 8.336	109.580 mph
4	(Republic of Ireland) Michael Sweeney	Aprilia	+ 27.741	107.799 mph
5	(England) Barry Furber	Yamaha	+ 28.188	107.758 mph
6	(South Africa) Allann Venter	Kawasaki	+ 29.024	107.683 mph
7	(England) Michael Rutter	Yamaha	+ 1 Lap	107.463 mph
8	(England) Christian Elkin	Kawasaki	+ 1 Lap	106.963 mph
9	(Northern Ireland) Darryl Tweed	Aprilia	+ 1 Lap	106.284 mph
10	(Scotland) Maurizio Bottalico	Paton	+ 1 Lap	106.155 mph

Fastest Lap: Adam McLean – Yamaha, 4 minutes, 51.111 seconds; 110.927 mph (178.520 km/h) on lap 3

==== Race 5; 1000cc Superbike Race 2 final standings ====
Saturday 10 May 2025 6 laps – 53.656 miles

Rank	Rider	Team	Time	Speed
1	(Northern Ireland) Michael Dunlop	BMW	26' 05.717	123.425 mph
2	(England) Davey Todd	BMW	+ 1.984	123.268 mph
3	(England) Peter Hickman	BMW	+ 7.005	122.875 mph
4	(Northern Ireland) Alastair Seeley	BMW	+ 15.486	122.216 mph
5	(England) Dean Harrison	Honda	+ 21.880	121.724 mph
6	(England) Ian Hutchinson	BMW	+ 32.181	120.939 mph
7	(England) John McGuinness	Honda	+ 35.953	120.654 mph
8	(Finland) Erno Kostamo	BMW	+ 37.533	120.535 mph
9	(Australia) Josh Brookes	Honda	+ 51.487	119.495 mph
10	(Isle of Man) Michael Evans	Honda	+ 57.228	119.072 mph

Fastest Lap: Michael Dunlop – BMW, 4 minutes, 17.226 seconds; 125.539 mph (202.035 km/h) on lap 5

==== Race 6; 600cc Supersport Race 2 final standings ====
Saturday 10 May 2025 4 laps – 35.724 miles

Rank	Rider	Team	Time	Speed
1	(England) Richard Cooper	Yamaha	18' 14.560	117.549 mph
2	(England) Dean Harrison	Honda	+ 0.140	117.534 mph
3	(Northern Ireland) Michael Dunlop	Ducati	+ 0.294	117.517 mph
4	(England) Davey Todd	Honda	+ 11.062	116.373 mph
5	(England) Peter Hickman	Triumph	+ 11.289	116.349 mph
6	(Northern Ireland) Alastair Seeley	Kawasaki	+ 11.483	116.328 mph
7	(Australia) Josh Brookes	Honda	+ 11.766	116.298 mph
8	(Northern Ireland) Paul Jordan	Honda	+ 12.106	116.263 mph
9	(England) Ian Hutchinson	Yamaha	+ 23.043	115.125 mph
10	(Republic of Ireland) Kevin Keyes	Yamaha	+ 39.812	113.423 mph

Fastest Lap: Michael Dunlop – Ducati, 4 minutes, 32.932 seconds; 118.315 mph (190.410 km/h) on lap 3

==== Race 7; 1000cc Superstock Race 2 final standings ====
Saturday 10 May 2025 6 laps – 53.656 miles

Rank	Rider	Team	Time	Speed
1	(England) Davey Todd	BMW	26' 07.005	123.323 mph
2	(England) Dean Harrison	Honda	+ 0.586	123.277 mph
3	(England) Peter Hickman	BMW	+ 0.823	123.258 mph
4	(Northern Ireland) Alastair Seeley	BMW	+ 6.792	122.791 mph
5	(England) Ian Hutchinson	BMW	+ 19.031	121.843 mph
6	(Northern Ireland) Paul Jordan	Honda	+ 19.213	121.829 mph
7	(Finland) Erno Kostamo	BMW	+ 29.404	121.052 mph
8	(England) John McGuinness	Honda	+ 36.711	120.500 mph
9	(Isle of Man) Michael Evans	Honda	+ 39.762	120.271 mph
10	(Republic of Ireland) Michael Sweeney	BMW	+ 40.638	120.206 mph

Fastest Lap: Peter Hickman – BMW, 4 minutes, 19.924 seconds; 124.236 mph (199.938 km/h) on lap 5

==== Race 8; 650cc Supertwin Race 2 final standings ====
Saturday 10 May 2025 4 laps – 35.724 miles

Rank	Rider	Team	Time	Speed
1	(Northern Ireland) Paul Jordan	Kawasaki	19' 33.581	109.634 mph
2	(Republic of Ireland) Michael Sweeney	Aprilia	+ 9.818	108.724 mph
3	(England) Barry Furber	Yamaha	+ 15.547	108.200 mph
4	(South Africa) Allann Venter	Kawasaki	+ 15.673	108.189 mph
5	(Northern Ireland) Darryl Tweed	Aprilia	+ 37.687	106.223 mph
6	(France) Jonathan Goetschy	Aprilia	+ 39.368	106.075 mph
7	(Switzerland) Mauro Poncini	Yamaha	+ 54.357	104.781 mph
8	(Scotland) Kris Duncan	Aprilia	+ 56.418	104.605 mph
9	(England) Daniel Ingham	Yamaha	+ 56.522	104.596 mph
10	(Republic of Ireland) Dean McMaster	Kawasaki	+ 56.789	104.573 mph

Fastest Lap: Adam McLean – Yamaha, 4 minutes, 50.565 seconds; 111.135 mph (178.854 km/h) on lap 2

==== Race 9; NW200 1000cc Superbike final standings ====
Saturday 10 May 2025 6 laps – 53.656 miles (Note: Red flag after 5 laps - result declared)

Rank	Rider	Team	Time	Speed
1	(England) Davey Todd	BMW	26' 07.005	123.323 mph
2	(England) Dean Harrison	Honda	+ 0.586	123.277 mph
3	(Northern Ireland) Alastair Seeley	BMW	+ 6.792	122.791 mph
4	(England) Ian Hutchinson	BMW	+ 19.031	121.843 mph
5	(Australia) Josh Brookes	Honda	+ 0.823	123.258 mph
6	(England) John McGuinness	Honda	+ 36.711	120.500 mph
7	(Finland) Erno Kostamo	BMW	+ 29.404	121.052 mph
8	(England) Michael Rutter	BMW	+ 19.213	121.829 mph
9	(Isle of Man) Conor Cummins	BMW	+ 39.762	120.271 mph
10	(Australia) David Johnson	Kawasaki	+ 40.638	120.206 mph

Fastest Lap: Michael Dunlop – BMW, 4 minutes, 17.348 seconds; 125.480 mph (201.940 km/h) on lap 2

== See also ==
- North West 200 – History and results from the event
