= Malachi Mitchell-Thomas =

British motorcycle racer (1995–2016)

- Nationality: English
- Born: 23 September 1995
- Died: 14 May 2016 (aged 20); Coleraine, Northern Ireland

Malachi Mitchell-Thomas (23 September 1995 – 14 May 2016) was a motorcycle racer from Blackrod, Greater Manchester.

== Career ==
Mitchell-Thomas started racing in supermoto at the age of 13. He took part in the Simoncelli Foundation Supermoto Charity event, in Italy, at the age of 16.

Mitchell-Thomas started pure road racing back in 2014 at the Isle of Man, in the Southern 100. Mitchell-Thomas made his debut at the Snaefell Mountain Course in the same year, finishing in fourth position at the Manx Grand Prix. He then won the Senior Manx Grand Prix in 2015, aged just 19, setting a new race lap record in the process.

In 2016, Mitchell-Thomas was signed by Cookstown Burrows Engineering Racing to race in the upcoming motorcycling season, a deal that included a participation in the Isle of Man TT. Mitchell-Thomas won three races at the Mid Antrim 150, and finished on the podium at the Cookstown 100 and Tandragee 100. At the 2016 North West 200, he finished in fifth place in the Thursday Supertwin race, and in fourth place in the Saturday Supersport race, a few hours before his death.

== Death ==
Mitchell-Thomas died of injuries received at the North West 200 on 14 May 2016, in a Supertwin race. The 20-year-old crashed his Kawasaki on the approach to Black Hill. The race was immediately red flagged and Mitchell-Thomas was treated by medical staff from the MCUI Medical team but died at the scene. No other riders were involved in the incident. Racing was subsequently abandoned. Around 200 motorcycles and cars were part of an escort for Mitchell-Thomas' funeral. His ashes were scattered by his father Kevin, at the 2016 Isle of Man TT festival.

Mitchell-Thomas was leading the 2016 Duke Road Racing Rankings at the time of his death.

== Career statistics ==
=== British Supersport Championship ===
(key) (Races in bold indicate pole position; races in italics indicate fastest lap)

Year	Bike	1	2	3	4	5	6	7	8	9	10	11	12	13	14	15	16	17	18	19	20	21	22	23	24	Pos	Pts
2015	Kawasaki	DON	DON	BRH	BRH	OUL	OUL	SNE	SNE	KNO	KNO	BRH	BRH	THR	THR	CAD	CAD	OUL	OUL	ASS	ASS	SIL; Ret	SIL; Ret	BRH; 17	BRH; 17	NC	0
