= Derek Chatterton =

British motorcycle racer

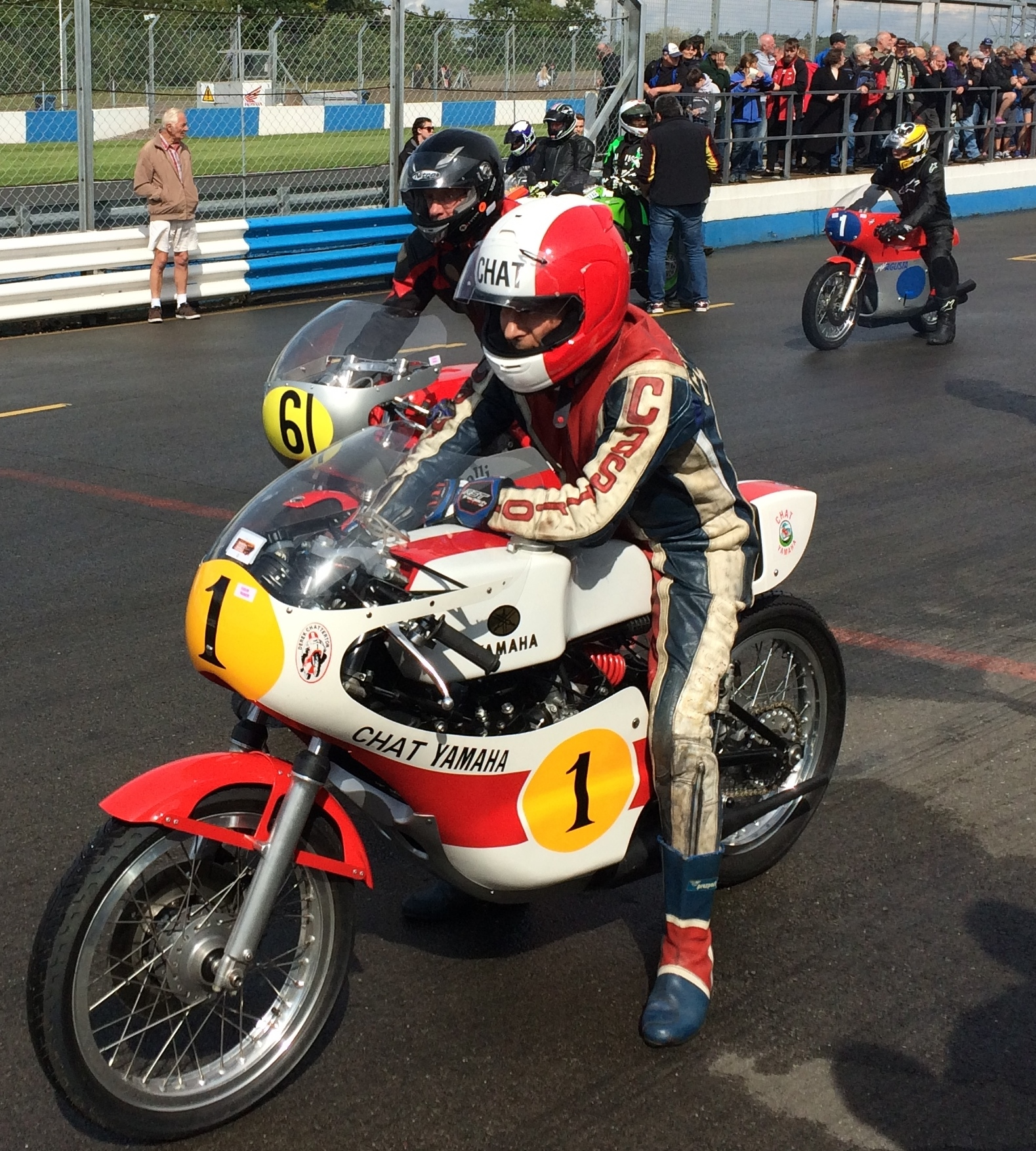
- Derek Chatterton at the Donington Classic Motorcycle Festival August 2017
- Nationality: (United Kingdom) British
Motorcycle racing career statistics
Grand Prix motorcycle racing
Active years	1967 - 1977
First race	1967 Isle of Man 250cc Lightweight TT
Last race	1977 500cc British Grand Prix
Starts / Wins / Podiums / Poles / F. laps / Points; 12 / 0 / 1 / N/A / N/A / 71

Derek Chatterton (Born 31 January 1945) is a British former professional motorcycle road racer.

== Motorcycle racing career ==
Born in Lincolnshire, England, Chatterton's motorcycle road racing career spanned thirty years, beginning in 1961 at the age of 16. His first race was at Cadwell Park in Lincolnshire on a 1949 250 cc (15 cu in) Velocette, early promise that year didn't initially translate to good results until Mallory Park at the end of the season where Chatterton, riding an NSU Sportmax, finished third in the Junior race collecting 'Rider of the Meeting' in the process. In 1967, riding a Ducati framed Yamaha TD1, he won the British 250cc National championship. Chatterton also won the 1970 British 350cc National championship. In 1974, Chatterton scored an impressive 500cc class victory over multi-time world champion Giacomo Agostini at Cadwell Park.

Chatterton also competed in Grand Prix motorcycle racing. His best season was in 1975 when he finished the year in 15th place in the 250cc world championship. At the 1977 500cc British Grand Prix, Chatterton finished in seventh place on a Suzuki RG500. He was also a two-time winner of the North West 200 road race in Northern Ireland, winning the 250cc event in 1971 and 1975 on a Yamaha. Chatterton was a regular Isle of Man TT competitor from 1968 until 1991, his best result was a second-place finish in the 1975 Lightweight 250cc race on a Chat Yamaha. During practice for the 1991 Isle of Man TT races, he suffered a high speed crash on a Honda RS250 at Ballaspur which resulted in multiple injuries which ended his racing career.

== Later career ==
Chatterton is still involved in the motorcycle industry however, running his long-standing motorcycle business Chatterton Motors and is still active in historic motorsport events such as; the 1998 Dutch TT Centennial meeting at Assen, the 60th anniversary Scarborough meeting at Olivers Mount, the 2014 Cadwell Park 80th anniversary meeting and at the Donington Park Classic Motorcycle Festival where he paraded a Yamaha TZ 350cc racebike.
