= North West 200 =

Motorcycle road race in Northern Ireland

Coordinates: 55°11′34.7″N 6°41′51.27″W

International North West 200
- Venue: The Triangle
- Location: Northern Ireland
- First race: 1929
- Most wins (rider): Alastair Seeley (29)
- Most wins (manufacturer): Honda (96)

The International North West 200 is a motorcycle road race first held in 1929 on a 8.970 mi (14.436 km) street circuit known as "the Triangle" between the towns of Portstewart, Coleraine and Portrush in Causeway Coast and Glens. It is the largest annual sporting event in Northern Ireland, with the race weekend attracting over 150,000 visitors from all over the world. The course is one of the fastest in the world, with average speeds of 120 mph (190 km/h) and top speeds in excess of 200 mph (320 km/h).

Originally intended to be held somewhere in the north west of Ireland and organised by the City of Derry & District Motor Club, the initial meeting was moved to the north coast but the name was never changed. Since 1964 the event has been organised by the Coleraine and District Motor Club. In 2010, the meeting featured daytime practice on the Thursday for the first time.

During the 2011 on Saturday the 21st of May there were significant delays due to a hoax bomb alert. An extensive oil spill on the track then caused any and all racing to be cancelled after the completion of only one race.

In 2022 the event returned as the fonaCab & Nicholl Oils North West 200 after having been cancelled for the two previous years due to the COVID-19 pandemic.

On 9 February 2023, an announcement was made by the Motorcycle Union of Ireland about the 2023 event. This followed a significant increase in the insurance premium required to cover the event and consequently placed the race schedule under threat of being cancelled.

However, on 15 March 2023, the event organisers issued a statement that, following a sizeable donation by a prominent businessman and a revised insurance premium quote, the event would take place.

== Race format ==
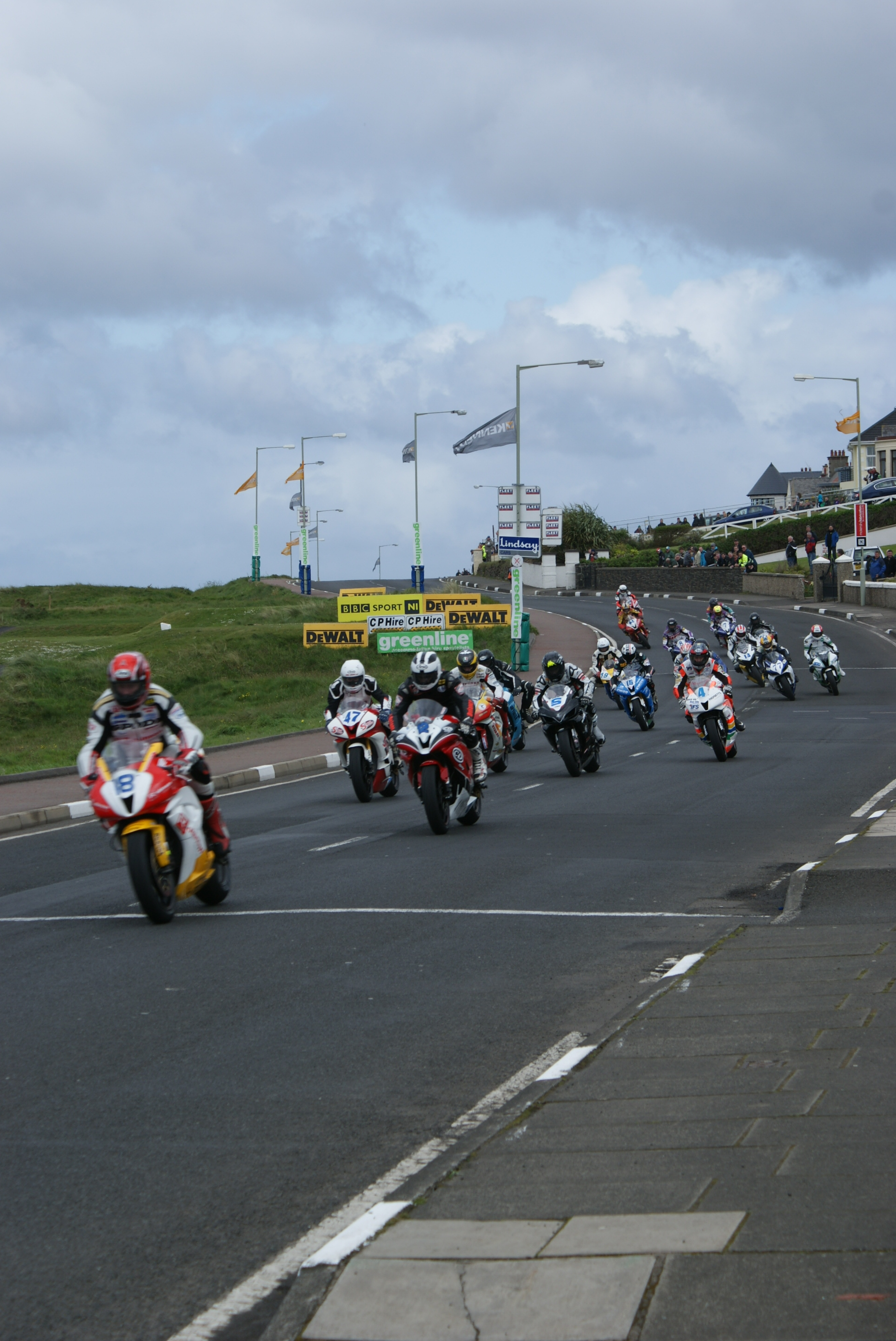
Riders approaching York from Juniper Hill during the 2009 event.

The North West 200 was originally run over two hundred miles as a handicap race, before changing to its current format of several separate races, each running 4–6 laps during Saturday afternoon. Practice is held on the Tuesday and Thursday evenings before the race. Both the practice and races are held on closed roads, but unlike the Isle of Man TT races which are run in a time-trial format, riders race each other as in normal circuit racing.

Over the years the number and the classes of races has varied according to the latest regulations. From 1990 until 2010, there was always a 125 cc race and since 1992 the North West 200 race has been for Superbikes.

From 2012 onwards, all practice sessions would take place during the day, and the racing programme has been extended to include two races on a Thursday evening. All of the races would be held over the course of six laps, except for the newly introduced Supertwin event.

== The course ==
The street circuit is made up almost entirely of public roads (A2, B185 & A29) but does include three speed-reducing chicanes. The route, running anti-clockwise enters the outskirts of the towns passing many private houses. To help improve track safety street signs are removed at parts of the track and bales of hay are used to wrap the base of lampposts and telegraph poles.

The circuit is 8.970 mi (14.436 km) long, with a distance of 8.834 mi (14.217 km) being covered on the first lap of every race. The original start/finish line was located near Magherabouy but moved to the Portmore Road in Portstewart in 1930. The elevation ranges from 6 to 75 metres (20 to 245 ft) above sea level.

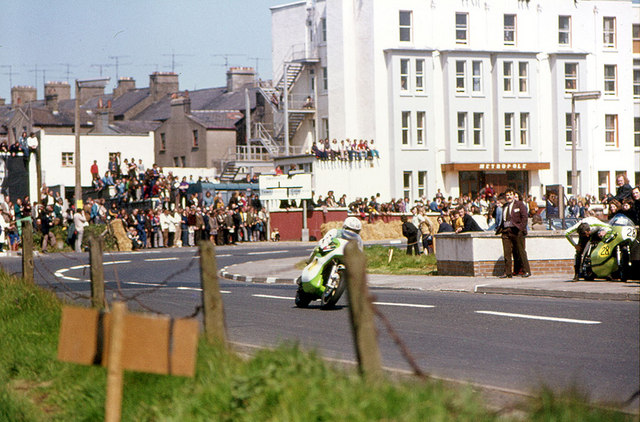
Mick Grant passes the Railway Bank at Metropole Corner, Portrush, 1975

1973 saw the first major changes to the course, which include the exclusion of the Promenade at Portstewart from the route and the moving of the start/finish line to its current location between Juniper Hill and Millbank Avenue. These changes meant the route used Station Road (B185) for the first time and saw the introduction of York Corner. Shell Hill Bridge, an iconic part of the original course was used for the last time in 1979. In 1980, a new link road, from University Corner to Ballysally Roundabout, was introduced. A chicane was introduced just before the approach to the Juniper Hill corner in 1983 and in 1988 improvements were made to Mather's Cross and the start/finish chicane was introduced to reduce the speeds around Primrose Hill as well as allowing safer access to the pitlane.

At the end of 2009 Mather's Cross was widened in order improve safety at the corner. For 2010 additional modifications were made to the circuit to improve safety. A new purpose-built chicane at Mather's Cross was introduced to reduce speeds at the corner and safety improvements made to the area at Station corner.

Jack Brett recorded the first 100 mph (160 km/h) lap of the course on a Manx Norton 500 cc in 1957. The fastest recorded lap at 127.63 mph (205.40 km/h) was set by Tom Herron during the 1978 North West 200 race.

Peter Hickman holds the outright lap record for the circuit configuration with four chicanes, set during the 2022 Superbike event, at 124.799 mph (200.845 km/h).

In 2004, Michael Rutter became the first rider to record a top speed in excess of 200 mph (320 km/h) on the course. During Tuesday's practice at the 2012 event Martin Jessopp set a new fastest speed trap time, reaching 208 mph (335 km/h) on the approach to University Corner.

== Controversies ==
In 2022, Richard Cooper won two Supertwin races but was disqualified after scrutineers found a fairing bracket to be non-standard and deemed it to be a breach of regulations. The team's appeal was successful and in November 2023 Cooper was re-instated as winner of both legs, with prize monies awarded retrospectively. Prior to the announcement, Cooper had won both legs at the same event in May, tallying his wins to four.

In 2023, Faye Ho's FHO team riders Peter Hickman and Josh Brookes were disqualified immediately before the start of the Superstock class for using standard wheels on the road-bike based M1000 RRs. Regulations stated the standard carbon fibre road wheels were not allowed, even though the team had raced with them in previous years and successfully completed 2023 scrutineering and practice. As non-standard wheels are not allowed, the team could not use race-specification metal wheels as fitted to the Superbike class machines, so Ho withdrew the team as a protest, with no more classes entered.

In 2025, there was controversy in the Superbike race surrounding the eventual winner Michael Dunlop. Both Dunlop and fellow competitor Peter Hickman missed the Mather's Cross chicane and event rules stipulate that any rider cutting a chicane must put their foot down in the stop-box before proceeding, otherwise a 10-second penalty will be issued to the offending rider. Hickman stopped at the penalty box but Dunlop carried on, retrospectively claiming it would not have been possible for him to do so given his track position. The event organisers initially issued Dunlop with the 10-second penalty which meant that Hickman's teammate Davey Todd was declared the winner. However, upon Dunlop's protest and explanation of his reasons for not stopping, the penalty was rescinded and Dunlop was ultimately awarded the race win.

== Deaths at the event ==
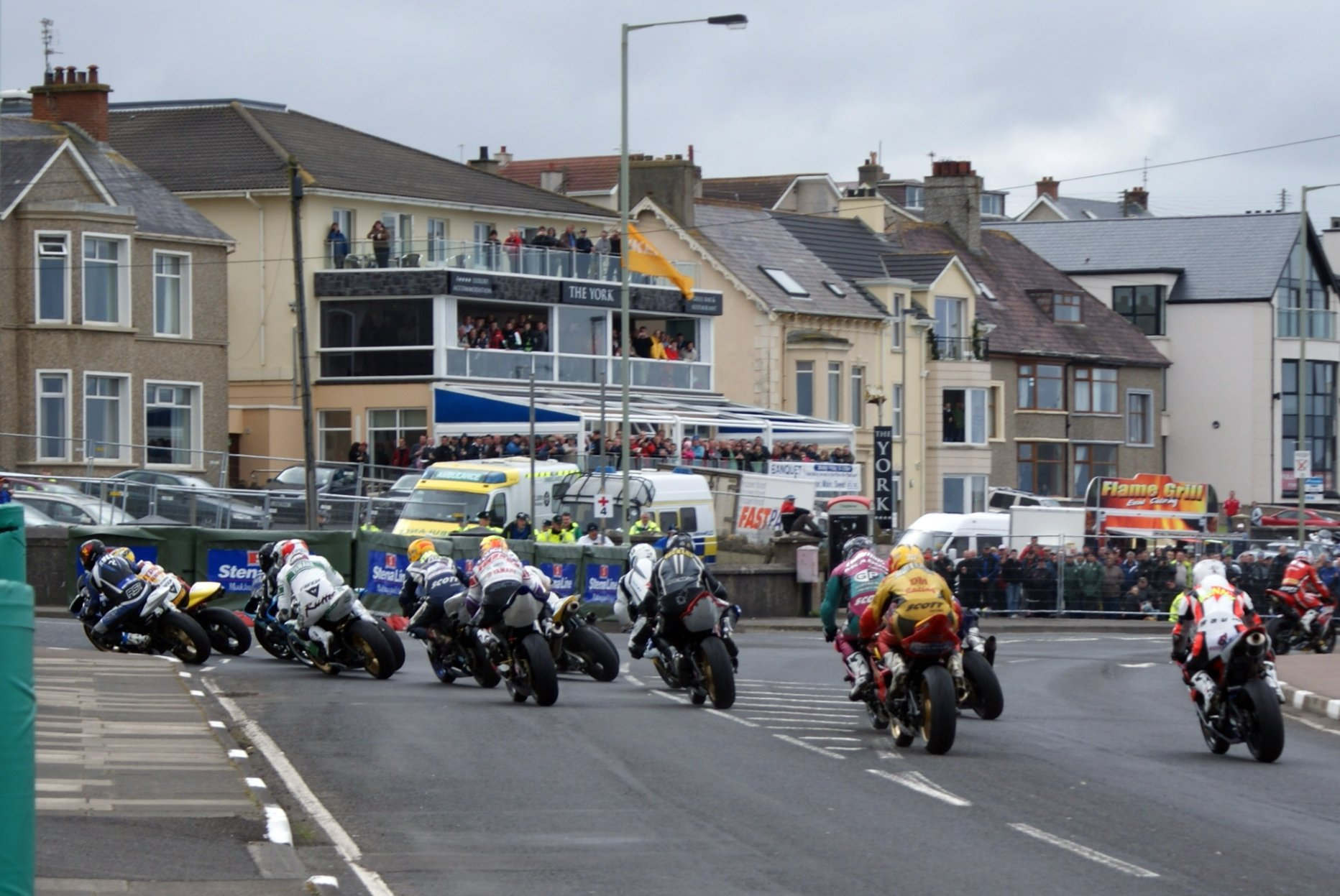
A group of riders entering York Corner during the 2009 event

The first recorded death at the event was Norman Wainwright who was killed in 1939.

=== 1979 ===
Black Saturday as it is known, is regarded as the darkest day in the event's history after crashes claimed the lives of three riders, Tom Herron, Brian Hamilton and Frank Kennedy who died months later from his injuries.

=== Robert Dunlop ===
Robert Dunlop died on 15 May 2008 while practising in the 250cc class. The incident occurred as he was approaching Mather's Cross during the 125/250/400cc practice session. It is understood his bike seized and Robert was thrown over his handlebars at approximately 160 mph (260 km/h). Fellow rider Darren Burns was following immediately behind and collided with Robert, suffering a broken leg and suspected concussion. Robert suffered severe chest injuries and died in hospital shortly afterwards.

=== Mark Young ===
Mark Young died during the 2009 event on 17 May 2009. It was Young's first race at the North West 200 although he had road racing experience.

=== Mark Buckley ===
Mark Buckley suffered a fatal crash on Millbank Avenue outside Portstewart during the Superstock race on 19 May 2012. He was taken to hospital but later died from his injuries. No other competitors were involved with this incident.

=== Simon Andrews ===
Simon Andrews was airlifted to a hospital in Northern Ireland in critical condition after suffering a serious crash while competing in the North West 200 on Saturday, 17 May 2014. Andrews came off his bike and slid down the asphalt until he collided head-first with a section of raised concrete pavement while curbing at high speed in Portrush, County Antrim. After receiving immediate medical intervention from the race doctors and medics, Andrews was airlifted to the Royal Victoria Hospital in Belfast in a critical condition after suffering the high-speed accident on the approach to Metropole corner. Andrews was competing in the second Superstock race of the event aboard his BMW. He died in hospital on 19 May 2014 as a result of his injuries, aged 31.

=== Malachi Mitchell-Thomas ===
Malachi Mitchell-Thomas died as a result of a crash on the third lap of the Supertwins race at the Vauxhall International North West 200 on 14 May 2016. The 20-year-old from Chorley in Lancashire crashed his Burrows Engineering Kawasaki on the approach to Black Hill. The race was immediately red flagged and Malachi was treated by medical staff from the MCUI Medical team but succumbed to his injuries at the scene. No other riders were involved in the incident. Racing was subsequently abandoned.

=== Kamil Holán ===
Kamil Holán died on 7 May 2026 after an incident in Superbike qualifying. The 48-year-old Czech rider had a crash at the fast Station Corner and died at the scene. His family gave their permission for racing to continue for the remainder of the event.

=== All competitor deaths ===
No	Rider	Date	Place	Race	Event	Machine
1	Norman Wainwright	May 1939	Drumslade	1939 North West 200 Races		500cc Norton
2	P.L.Phillips	15 May 1949	Portstewart	1949 North West 200 Races		
3	William Bennison	May 1951	BallySally	1951 North West 200 Races	Lightweight 350cc	350cc
4	L.G.Aislabie	27 May 1956		1956 North West 200 Races		
5	Andrew Manship	23 May 1970	Primrose Hill	1970 North West 200 Races	Practice	350cc Yamaha
6	Graham Fish	27 May 1973	Station Corner	1973 North West 200 Races	Practice	Yamaha
7	Brian Hamilton	26 May 1979	Black Hill	1979 North West 200 Races	350cc Race	350cc Yamaha
8	Tom Herron	26 May 1979	Juniper Hill	1979 North West 200 Races	Superbike Race	750cc Suzuki
9	Frank Kennedy	26 May 1979	University Corner	1979 North West 200 Races	Superbike Race	500cc Suzuki
10	Mervyn Robinson	May 1980	Mather's Cross	1980 North West 200 Races	500cc Race	350cc Yamaha
11	John Newbold	15 May 1982	Juniper Hill	1982 North West 200 Races	Superbike Race	1000cc Suzuki
12	Pat McLaughlin	May 1986	Mather's Cross	1986 North West 200 Races	Lightweight Race	250cc Rotax
13	Steve Bull	9 May 1987	Mather's Cross	1987 North West 200 Races	Practice	750cc Yamaha
14	Donny Robinson	11 May 1999	Station Road	1999 North West 200 Races	Practice	125cc Yamaha
15	Robert Dunlop	15 May 2008	Mather's Cross	2008 North West 200 Races	Practice	250cc Yamaha
16	Mark Young	16 May 2009	Mather's Cross	2009 North West 200 Races	250cc Race	250cc Honda
17	Mark Buckley	19 May 2012	Millbank Avenue	2012 North West 200 Races	Superstock Race	1000cc Aprilia
18	Simon Andrews	19 May 2014	Coleraine Road	2014 North West 200 Races	Superstock Race	1000cc BMW
19	Malachi Mitchell-Thomas	14 May 2016	Dhu Varren	2016 North West 200 Races	Supertwins Race	649cc Kawasaki
20	Kamil Holán	7 May 2026	Station Corner	2026 North West 200 Races	Superbike Qualifying	1000cc BMW

== Winners ==
Alastair Seeley from Northern Ireland, holds the record number of 29 wins. Robert Dunlop was the previous record holder with 15 wins. Michael Rutter won fourteen races. Joey Dunlop (Robert's brother) won thirteen races. Michael Dunlop and William Dunlop (both sons of Robert) have also won races at the North West 200.

The early years of the event was dominated by British motorcycle manufacturers, in particular Norton. It was only in 1964 that Honda claimed their first victory. 2010 saw BMW score their first victory at the event and also the first non-Japanese manufacturer to claim a victory since 1997. Yamaha is the only manufacturer to have a clean sweep, winning all five races in 1979.

=== Multiple winners ===
# Wins	Riders							
29	Alastair Seeley							
15	Robert Dunlop							
14	Michael Rutter							
13	Joey Dunlop							
12	Glenn Irwin							
11	Phillip McCallen							
10	Bruce Anstey							
9	Tony Rutter	Davey Todd	Michael Dunlop					
8	Ian Lougher	Steve Plater						
6	Steve Cull	John McGuinness						
5	Arthur Wheeler	Tommy Robb	John Williams	Mick Grant	Woolsey Coulter	Ian Simpson	Ryan Farquhar	Lee Johnston
5	Peter Hickman							
4	Bob McIntyre	David Jefferies	Jimmie Guthrie	Ernie Nott	Eddie Laycock	William Dunlop	Richard Cooper	Jeremy McWilliams
3	Alan Shepherd	Artie Bell	Callum Ramsey	Geoff Duke	Charlie Williams	Jim Moodie	Eric Fernihough	Ray McCullough
3	Rod Gould	Trevor Nation	Tom Herron	Sammy Miller	Ian Hutchinson	Martin Jessopp		
2	Alistair King	Andy Watts	Bob Anderson	Carl Fogarty	Charlie Manders	John White	Derek Chatterton	Donny Robinson
2	Fred Stevens	Gary Cowan	Graham Wood	Ian Newton	Jack Brett	John Blanchard	Kevin Mitchell	Peter Williams
2	Phelim Owens	Dick Creith	Robert Holden	Roger Marshall	Steve Hislop	Walter Rusk	Olie Linsdell	Ivan Lintin
2	Storm Stacey							

=== By year ===
	Supersport (I)	Superstock (I)	Supertwins (I)	Supersport (II)	Superbike (I)	Superbike (II)	Supertwins (II)	Superstock (II)	NW 200
2026	Cancelled	Cancelled	(England) Peter Hickman	(Northern Ireland) Michael Dunlop	Cancelled	(Northern Ireland) Glenn Irwin	(Northern Ireland) Jeremy McWilliams	(England) Storm Stacey	(England) Storm Stacey
2025	(Northern Ireland) Michael Dunlop	(Northern Ireland) Michael Dunlop	(Northern Ireland) Paul Jordan	(England) Richard Cooper	(Northern Ireland) Michael Dunlop	(England) Davey Todd	(England) Richard Cooper	(England) Davey Todd	(England) Davey Todd
2024	(England) Richard Cooper	(England) Davey Todd	(England) Peter Hickman	(England) Davey Todd	(Northern Ireland) Glenn Irwin	(Northern Ireland) Glenn Irwin	(England) Peter Hickman	(England) Davey Todd	(Northern Ireland) Glenn Irwin
2023	(England) Davey Todd	(Northern Ireland) Alastair Seeley	(England) Richard Cooper	(England) Davey Todd	(Northern Ireland) Glenn Irwin		(England) Richard Cooper	(Northern Ireland) Alastair Seeley	(Northern Ireland) Glenn Irwin
2022	(Northern Ireland) Alastair Seeley	(Northern Ireland) Alastair Seeley	(England) Richard Cooper	(Northern Ireland) Lee Johnston	(Northern Ireland) Glenn Irwin		(England) Richard Cooper	(Northern Ireland) Alastair Seeley	(Northern Ireland) Glenn Irwin
2021	Cancelled due to the COVID-19 pandemic.								
2020	Cancelled due to the COVID-19 pandemic.								
2019	(Northern Ireland) Lee Johnston	(England) Peter Hickman	(Italy) Stefano Bonetti	(England) Davey Todd	(Northern Ireland) Glenn Irwin		(Northern Ireland) Jeremy McWilliams	(England) James Hillier	Cancelled
2018	(Northern Ireland) Alastair Seeley	(England) Peter Hickman	(England) Martin Jessopp	(Northern Ireland) Alastair Seeley	(Northern Ireland) Glenn Irwin		(England) James Cowton	(Northern Ireland) Alastair Seeley	(Northern Ireland) Glenn Irwin
2017	(England) Martin Jessopp	(Northern Ireland) Alastair Seeley	(England) Martin Jessopp	(Northern Ireland) Alastair Seeley	(Northern Ireland) Alastair Seeley		(England) Michael Rutter	(Northern Ireland) Alastair Seeley	(Northern Ireland) Glenn Irwin
2016	(Northern Ireland) Alastair Seeley	(England) Ian Hutchinson	(England) Ivan Lintin	(Northern Ireland) Alastair Seeley	(Northern Ireland) Michael Dunlop		(England) Ivan Lintin	Cancelled	Cancelled
2015	(Northern Ireland) Alastair Seeley	Abandoned	(Northern Ireland) Ryan Farquhar	(Northern Ireland) Alastair Seeley	(Northern Ireland) Alastair Seeley		(Northern Ireland) Jeremy McWilliams	(Northern Ireland) Lee Johnston	Cancelled
2014	(Northern Ireland) Alastair Seeley	(Northern Ireland) Alastair Seeley	(Northern Ireland) Lee Johnston	(New Zealand) Bruce Anstey	(Northern Ireland) William Dunlop		(Northern Ireland) Lee Johnston	(Northern Ireland) Michael Dunlop	(Northern Ireland) Michael Dunlop
2013	(Northern Ireland) Alastair Seeley	(Northern Ireland) Alastair Seeley	(Northern Ireland) Jeremy McWilliams	(Northern Ireland) Michael Dunlop	Cancelled		Cancelled	Cancelled	Cancelled
2012	(Northern Ireland) William Dunlop	(Northern Ireland) Alastair Seeley	(Northern Ireland) Ryan Farquhar	(Northern Ireland) Alastair Seeley	(England) John McGuinness			(England) Michael Rutter	(Northern Ireland) Alastair Seeley
2011	(Northern Ireland) Alastair Seeley	Cancelled		Cancelled	Cancelled				Cancelled

	125cc	250cc	400cc	Supersport/600cc (I)	Supersport/600cc (II)	Superstock/Production	Superbike	NW 200
2010	(Northern Ireland) Paul Robinson			(Northern Ireland) Alastair Seeley	(England) Ian Hutchinson	(Scotland) Keith Amor	(England) John McGuinness	(Northern Ireland) Alastair Seeley
2009	(Northern Ireland) William Dunlop	(Northern Ireland) William Dunlop		(England) Steve Plater	Cancelled	(Northern Ireland) Alastair Seeley	(England) Steve Plater	Cancelled
2008	(England) Michael Wilcox	(Northern Ireland) Michael Dunlop	(England) Olie Linsdell	(England) Steve Plater	(England) Steve Plater	(Northern Ireland) Alastair Seeley	(England) Michael Rutter	(England) Steve Plater
2007	(England) Olie Linsdell	(England) Christian Elkin	Combined with 125cc	(New Zealand) Bruce Anstey	(New Zealand) Bruce Anstey	(New Zealand) Bruce Anstey	(England) John McGuinness	(England) Steve Plater
2006	(Northern Ireland) Robert Dunlop	(Isle of Man) Nigel Beattie	Combined with 125cc	(England) Ian Hutchinson	(New Zealand) Bruce Anstey	(New Zealand) Bruce Anstey	(England) Steve Plater	(England) Steve Plater
2005	(Northern Ireland) Darran Lindsay	(Northern Ireland) Davy Morgan	Combined with 125cc	(Republic of Ireland) Raymond Porter	(Northern Ireland) Ryan Farquhar	(Wales) Ian Lougher	(England) Michael Rutter	(New Zealand) Bruce Anstey
2004	(Wales) Ian Lougher		(England) John McGuinness	(New Zealand) Bruce Anstey	(England) John McGuinness	(New Zealand) Bruce Anstey	(England) Michael Rutter	(England) Michael Rutter
2003	(Wales) Ian Lougher		Combined with 125cc	(Northern Ireland) Ryan Farquhar	(Northern Ireland) Ryan Farquhar	(Northern Ireland) Adrian Archibald	(England) Michael Rutter	Cancelled
2002	(Wales) Ian Lougher			(Scotland) Jim Moodie	(Wales) Ian Lougher	(New Zealand) Bruce Anstey	(England) David Jefferies	(Scotland) Iain Duffus
2001	Cancelled due to the 2001 United Kingdom foot-and-mouth outbreak.							

	125cc	250/400cc (I)	250/400cc (II)	600cc	Production	Superbike	NW 200
2000	(Wales) Ian Lougher	(England) John McGuinness		(England) Michael Rutter	(Northern Ireland) Richard Britton	(England) Michael Rutter	(England) Michael Rutter
1999	(Wales) Ian Lougher	(Scotland) Callum Ramsey	(Scotland) Callum Ramsey	(England) David Jefferies		(England) David Jefferies	(England) David Jefferies
1998	Abandoned	(Northern Ireland) Woolsey Coulter		(Scotland) Ian Simpson	(England) Michael Rutter	(Scotland) Ian Simpson	(England) Michael Rutter
1997	(Northern Ireland) Phelim Owens	(Scotland) Callum Ramsey	(Northern Ireland) Owen McNally	(England) Michael Rutter	(Scotland) Ian Simpson	(Northern Ireland) Phillip McCallen	(England) Michael Rutter
1996	(England) Mick Lofthouse	(Northern Ireland) Woolsey Coulter	(Northern Ireland) Woolsey Coulter	(Northern Ireland) Phillip McCallen		(Scotland) Ian Simpson	(Northern Ireland) Phillip McCallen

1995	125 cc (United Kingdom) Phelim Owens	250/400 cc (I) (United Kingdom) Phillip McCallen	250/400 cc (II) (United Kingdom) Ian Newton	600 cc (United Kingdom) Phillip McCallen	Supermono (New Zealand) Robert Holden	Superbikes (United Kingdom) Ian Simpson	NW 200 (New Zealand) Robert Holden
1994	125 cc (United Kingdom) Robert Dunlop	250/400 cc (I) (United Kingdom) Woolsey Coulter	250/400 cc (II) (United Kingdom) Ian Newton	600 cc (United Kingdom) Mike Edwards	Supermono (United Kingdom) Alan Carter	Superbikes (United Kingdom) Robert Dunlop	NW 200 (United Kingdom) Robert Dunlop
1993	125 cc (United Kingdom) Robert Dunlop	250/350 cc (I) (United Kingdom) Robert Dunlop	250/350 cc (II) (United Kingdom) Robert Dunlop	400 cc (United Kingdom) Jim Moodie	600 cc (United Kingdom) Jim Moodie	Superbikes (United Kingdom) Carl Fogarty	NW 200 (United Kingdom) Carl Fogarty
1992	125 cc (United Kingdom) Robert Orme	250/350 cc (I) (United Kingdom) Phillip McCallen	250/350 cc (II) (United Kingdom) Robert Dunlop	400 cc (United Kingdom) Phillip McCallen	600 cc (United Kingdom) Phillip McCallen	Superbikes (United Kingdom) Phillip McCallen	NW 200 (United Kingdom) Phillip McCallen
1991	125 cc (United Kingdom) Robert Dunlop	250/350 cc (I) (United Kingdom) Robert Dunlop	250/350 cc (II) (United Kingdom) Ian Lougher	400 cc (United Kingdom) Dave Leach	600 cc (United Kingdom) Phillip McCallen	750 cc (United Kingdom) Robert Dunlop	NW 200 (United Kingdom) Trevor Nation
1990	125 cc (United Kingdom) Robert Dunlop	250 cc (I) (Republic of Ireland) Eddie Laycock	250 cc (II) (Republic of Ireland) Eddie Laycock	Superbikes (United Kingdom) Robert Dunlop	NW 200 (United Kingdom) Robert Dunlop		
1989	250/350 cc (I) (United Kingdom) Kevin Mitchel	250/350 cc (II) (United Kingdom) Woolsey Coulter	600 cc (Republic of Ireland) Brian Reid	Production (United Kingdom) James Whitham	750 cc (United Kingdom) Steve Hislop	NW 200 (United Kingdom) Steve Hislop	
1988	250/350 cc (I) (United Kingdom) Steve Cull	250 cc (II) (United Kingdom) Gary Cowan	750 cc (United Kingdom) Joey Dunlop	1300 cc (United Kingdom) Kenny Irons	Superbikes (United Kingdom) Steve Cull	NW 200 (United Kingdom) Steve Cull	
1987	250/350 cc (I) (United Kingdom) Gary Cowan	250 cc (II) (Republic of Ireland) Eddie Laycock	Superstock (United Kingdom) Roger Hurst	750 cc (United Kingdom) Joey Dunlop	1300 cc (United Kingdom) Trevor Nation	Superbikes (United Kingdom) Joey Dunlop	NW 200 (United Kingdom) Joey Dunlop
1986	250 cc (I) (Republic of Ireland) Eddie Laycock	250 cc (II) (United Kingdom) Andy Watts	350 cc (United Kingdom) Robert Dunlop	Superstock (United Kingdom) Trevor Nation	Superbikes (United Kingdom) Roger Marshall	NW 200 (United Kingdom) Joey Dunlop	
1985	250 cc (I) (United Kingdom) Joey Dunlop	250 cc (II) (United Kingdom) Steve Cull	350 cc (United Kingdom) Steve Cull	Superbikes (United Kingdom) Roger Marshall	NW 200 (United Kingdom) Joey Dunlop		
1984	250 cc (United Kingdom) Andy Watts	350 cc (United Kingdom) Kevin Mitchel	Superbikes (United Kingdom) Joey Dunlop	NW 200 (United Kingdom) Graham Wood			
1983	250 cc Courtney Junk	350 cc (United Kingdom) Norman Brown	500 cc (United Kingdom) Joey Dunlop	Superbikes (United Kingdom) Graham Wood	NW 200 (United Kingdom) Joey Dunlop		
1982	250 cc (United Kingdom) Donny Robinson	350 cc (United Kingdom) Tony Rutter	500 cc (New Zealand) Stu Avant	Superbikes (United Kingdom) Ron Haslam	1000 cc NW 200 (United Kingdom) Mick Grant		
1981	250 cc (United Kingdom) Steve Tonkin	350 cc (United Kingdom) Donny Robinson	500 cc (United Kingdom) Charlie Williams	1000 cc NW 200 (United Kingdom) Joey Dunlop			
1980	250 cc (United Kingdom) Steve Cull	350 cc (United Kingdom) Charlie Williams	500 cc (United Kingdom) Mick Grant	1000 cc NW 200 (United Kingdom) Keith Huewen			
1979	Match Race (United Kingdom) Joey Dunlop	250 cc (United Kingdom) Bob Jackson	350 cc (United Kingdom) Tony Rutter	500 cc (United Kingdom) Tony Rutter	1000 cc NW 200 (United Kingdom) Joey Dunlop		
1978	250 cc (United Kingdom) Tom Herron	350 cc (United Kingdom) Tony Rutter	500 cc (United Kingdom) John Newbold	750 cc #1 (United Kingdom) Tom Herron	750 cc #2 (United Kingdom) Tony Rutter		
1977	250 cc (United Kingdom) Tony Rutter	350 cc (United Kingdom) Ray McCullough	500 cc (United Kingdom) John Williams	750 cc #1 (United Kingdom) Mick Grant	750 cc#2 (United Kingdom) John Williams		
1976	250 cc (United Kingdom) Ian Richards	350 cc (United Kingdom) Ray McCullough	500 cc (United Kingdom) Martin Sharpe	750 cc (United Kingdom) Percy Tait			
1975	250 cc (United Kingdom) Derek Chatterton	350 cc (United Kingdom) Charlie Williams	500 cc (United Kingdom) Mick Grant	750 cc (United Kingdom) Mick Grant			
1974	250 cc (United Kingdom) Ray McCullough	350 cc (United Kingdom) John Williams	500 cc (United Kingdom) John Williams	750 cc (United Kingdom) John Williams			
1973	200 cc Jackie Robinson	250 cc (United Kingdom) Tony Rutter	350 cc (United Kingdom) Tony Rutter	500 cc (United Kingdom) Billy Guthrie	750 cc (United Kingdom) Geoff Barry		
1972	Not held						
1971	250 cc (United Kingdom) Derek Chatterton	350 cc (United Kingdom) Paul Smart	500 cc (United Kingdom) John Cooper				
1970	250 cc (Race) (United Kingdom) Ralph Bryans	350 cc (Race) (United Kingdom) Tom Herron	500 cc (Race) (United Kingdom) Peter Williams	250 cc (Production) (United Kingdom) Cliff Carr	500 cc (Production) (United Kingdom) Stuart Graham	750 cc (Production) (United Kingdom) Malcolm Uphill	
1969	250 cc (United Kingdom) Rod Gould	350 cc (United Kingdom) Rod Gould	500 cc (United Kingdom) John Blanchard				
1968	250 cc (United Kingdom) Rod Gould	350 cc (United Kingdom) Bill Smith	500 cc (United Kingdom) John Cooper				
1967	250 cc (United Kingdom) Steve Murray	350 cc (United Kingdom) Fred Stevens	500 cc (United Kingdom) Fred Stevens				
1966	250 cc (United Kingdom) John Blanchard	350 cc (United Kingdom) George Buchan	500 cc (United Kingdom) Peter Williams				
1965	250 cc (United Kingdom) Tommy Robb	350 cc (United Kingdom) Ian McGregor	500 cc (United Kingdom) Dick Creith				
1964	250 cc (United Kingdom) Ralph Bryans	350 cc (United Kingdom) Ralph Bryans	500 cc (United Kingdom) Dick Creith				
1963	Not held						
1962	250 cc (United Kingdom) Arthur Wheeler	350 cc (United Kingdom) Alan Shepherd	500 cc (United Kingdom) Alan Shepherd				
1961	250 cc (United Kingdom) Tommy Robb	350 cc (United Kingdom) Bob McIntyre	500 cc (United Kingdom) Bob McIntyre				
1960	250 cc (United Kingdom) Tommy Robb	350 cc (United Kingdom) Alan Shepherd	500 cc (United Kingdom) Derek Minter				
1959	125 cc (United Kingdom) Tommy Robb	250 cc (United Kingdom) Tommy Robb	350 cc (United Kingdom) Alistair King	500 cc (United Kingdom) Bob McIntyre			
1958	250 cc (United Kingdom) Sammy Miller	350 cc (United Kingdom) Alistair King	500 cc (United Kingdom) Jack Brett				
1957	250 cc (United Kingdom) Sammy Miller	350 cc (United Kingdom) Bob Anderson	500 cc (United Kingdom) Jack Brett				
1956	250 cc (United Kingdom) Sammy Miller	350 cc (Isle of Man) Derek Ennett	500 cc (United Kingdom) Bob Anderson				
1955	250 cc (United Kingdom) Alan Lyons	350 cc (United Kingdom) Jackie Wood	500 cc (United Kingdom) Geoff Duke				
1954	250 cc (United Kingdom) Arthur Wheeler	350 cc (Isle of Man) Derek Ennett	500 cc (Republic of Ireland) Reg Armstrong				
1953	250 cc (United Kingdom) Arthur Wheeler	350 cc (United Kingdom) Bob McIntyre	500 cc (United Kingdom) Syd Lawton				
1952	250 cc (United Kingdom) Arthur Wheeler	350 cc (United Kingdom) Harry Pearce	500 cc (United Kingdom) Ivor Arber				
1951	250 cc (United Kingdom) Arthur Wheeler	350 cc (United Kingdom) Dickie Dale	500 cc (United Kingdom) Geoff Duke				
1950	250 cc (United Kingdom) Ron Mead	350 cc (United Kingdom) Geoff Duke	500 cc (United Kingdom) Artie Bell				
1949	250 cc (United Kingdom) Harold Kirby	350 cc (United Kingdom) Harold Daniell	500 cc (United Kingdom) Artie Bell				
1948	Not held						
1947	250 cc (United Kingdom) Peter Gill	350 cc (United Kingdom) Malcolm Templeton	500 cc (United Kingdom) Artie Bell				
1940– 1946	Not held						
1939	250 cc (United Kingdom) Dennis Parkinson	350 cc (United Kingdom) Jimmy Little	500 cc (Republic of Ireland) Ernie Lyons				
1938	250 cc (Republic of Ireland) H. G. Tyrell Smith	350 cc (United Kingdom) Bob Foster	500 cc (United Kingdom) Jack Moore				
1937	250 cc (United Kingdom) Samuel Smith	350 cc (United Kingdom) John White	500 cc (United Kingdom) Jimmie Guthrie				
1936	250 cc (Republic of Ireland) Charlie Manders	350 cc (United Kingdom) John White	500 cc (United Kingdom) Jimmie Guthrie				
1935	250 cc (Republic of Ireland) Charlie Manders	350 cc (United Kingdom) Walter Rusk	500 cc (United Kingdom) Jimmie Guthrie				
1934	250 cc (United Kingdom) Michael McSorley	350 cc (United Kingdom) Walter Rusk	500 cc (United Kingdom) Jimmie Guthrie				
1933	250 cc (United Kingdom) Joe Woodside	350 cc (United Kingdom) Tim Hunt	500 cc (Republic of Ireland) Stanley Woods				
1932	250 cc (United Kingdom) Eric Fernihough	350 cc (United Kingdom) Wal Handley	500 cc (United Kingdom) Ernie Nott				
1931	250 cc (United Kingdom) Eric Fernihough	350 cc (United Kingdom) Graham Walker	500 cc (United Kingdom) Ernie Nott				
1930	250 cc (United Kingdom) Eric Fernihough	350 cc (United Kingdom) Tim Hunt	500 cc (United Kingdom) Ernie Nott				
1929	250 cc (United Kingdom) Malcolm McQuigg	350 cc (United Kingdom) Harry Meagen	500 cc (United Kingdom) Ernie Nott				

=== Manufacturers ===
# Wins	Manufacturer				
97	Honda				
73	Yamaha				
37	Norton				
34	Kawasaki				
32	Suzuki				
18	BMW				
16	Ducati				
10	Excelsior				
8	Aprilia	Rudge			
6	AJS				
4	Matchless	Moto Guzzi	NSU	Velocette	
3	Bultaco	EMC	GMS		
2	Gilera	Hannah-Paton	Seeley	Triumph	
1	Armstrong	BSA	Cotton	JAP	Ossa
1	Zenith	Spartan	Waddon	Yamsel	

== Media coverage ==
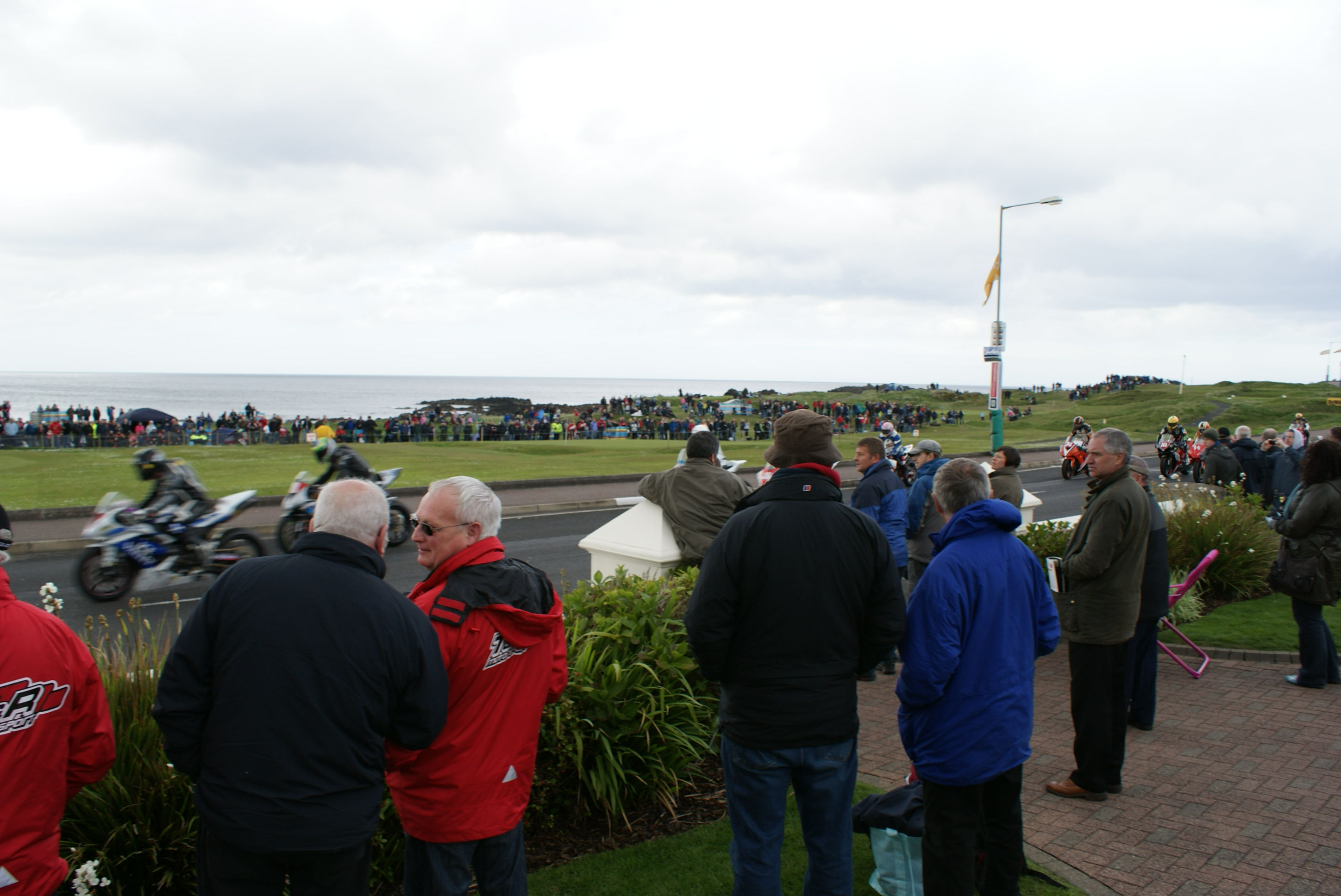
Spectators enjoying the 2009 event.

The event is covered by BBC Northern Ireland having previously been covered by UTV. All races are live on the BBC iPlayer. There is also live radio coverage on BBC Radio Ulster and live text commentary on the BBC Sport NI website. BBC NI also show highlights programmes presented by Stephen Watson, usually on the Sunday and Monday nights after the event. BBC Commentators include BBC MotoGP commentator Steve Parrish and five-time winner on a single day Phillip McCallen. In 2026 it was announced that BBC Sport NI had extended its contract to provide coverage of the event until 2029.

== Video game ==
The North West 200 features in Jester Interactive's PlayStation 2 title TT Superbikes: Real Road Racing Championship released at the end of May 2008. It is the sequel to their top 10 game TT Superbikes released in 2005. It is also featured in Milestone srl's Ride 2, Ride 3 Ride 4 and Ride 5 for PlayStation 4, Xbox One and PC.

== See also ==
- Clady Circuit
- Dundrod Circuit
- Isle of Man TT Races
- Ulster Grand Prix
