= Cameron Donald =

Australian motorcycle racer

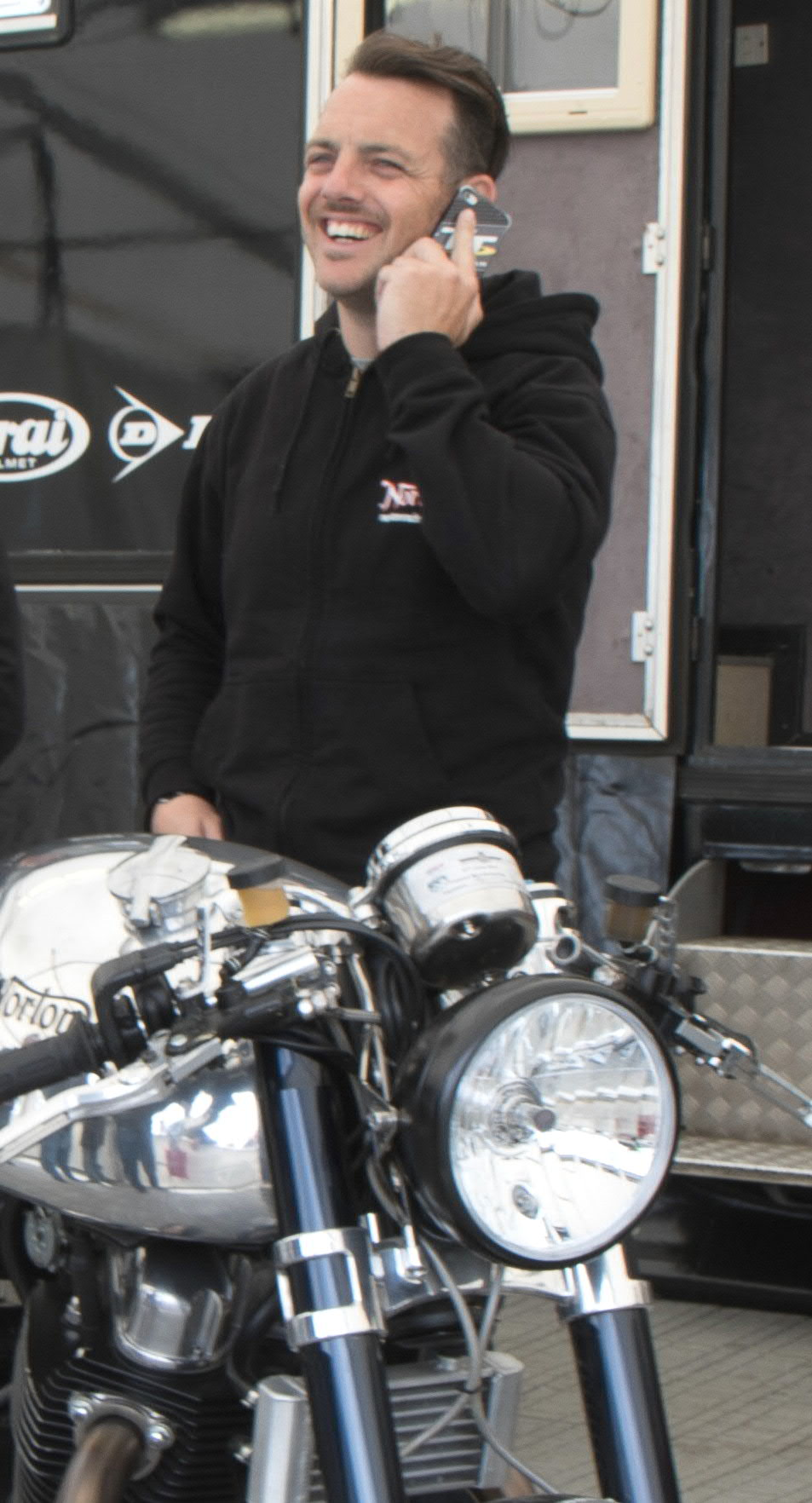
- Donald standing behind a Norton Domiracer, in the Norton paddock area, Isle of Man TT races, 2015
- Nationality: Australian
- Born: 28 September 1977 (age 49); Melbourne, Australia
- Current team: Wilson Craig Racing
- Bike number: 11
- Website: http://www.camerondonald.com/
Motorcycle racing career statistics
Isle of Man TT career
TTs contested	7 (2005, 2006, 2008, 2010–2013)
TT wins	2
First TT win	2008 Superbike TT
Last TT win	2008 Superstock TT
TT podiums	10

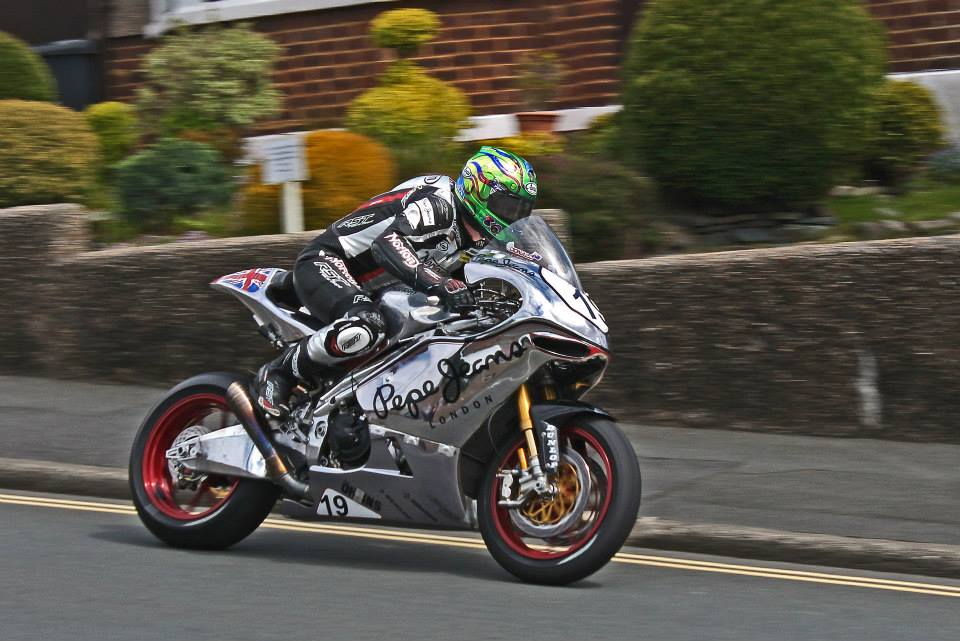
Donald descending Bray Hill on a Norton during the 2015 Isle of Man TT

Cameron Donald (born 28 September 1977 in Melbourne, Australia) is a professional motorcycle racer who has raced at the Macau Grand Prix, the North West 200 and the Isle of Man TT races. Donald has not raced at the TT since 2016, but has worked as a television presenter and commentator, also entering the Classic TT, part of the Manx Grand Prix races. He lives in Warrandyte, Victoria, Australia.

== Selected achievements ==
Donald has had many racing achievements, including

- 1st Victorian Dirt Track Champion (1996, 1997, 1998)
- 1st Macau Grand Prix - 600cc (2001)
- 1st (race 1 & 2) National Supersport support race Moto GP Phillip Island (2001)
- 1st Australian Formula Xtreme Privateer Cup - 600cc (2002)
- 1st Victorian Supersport Championship (2002)
- 2nd Oceanic Challenge Series NZ - 600cc (2002)
- 2nd Macau Grand Prix - 600CC (2002 and 2004)
- 1st Privateer in the Australian Formula Xtreme Championship (2003)
- 1st (Round 4) Australian Formula Xtreme Championship (2003)
- 1st Victorian Superbike Championship (2003)
- 1st Macau Grand Prix - 600cc (2003)
- 2nd FIM Asian Road Racing Championship (2003 and 2004)
- 1st Singapore Enduro Race (November 2003)
- 1st Newcomer Isle of Man TT (2005) - Race #1 - 16th position / Race #2 - 11th position
- 1st Newcomer North West 200 (2005) - Race #1 - 13th position / Race #2 - 12th position
- 1st Isle of Man TT Superbike Race (2008)
- 1st Isle of Man TT Superstock Race (2008)

== Uel Duncan Racing ==
Donald rode for Uel Duncan in 2007, after a highly successful 2006 season with them. His dreams of a TT win in 2007 were shattered at the North West 200, where he broke a collarbone in an incident at the Juniper Chicane. Donald was back on board the Honda at the Skerries races and left with two wins. Despite many promising performances, Donald has yet to win an International road race.

== Relentless Suzuki ==
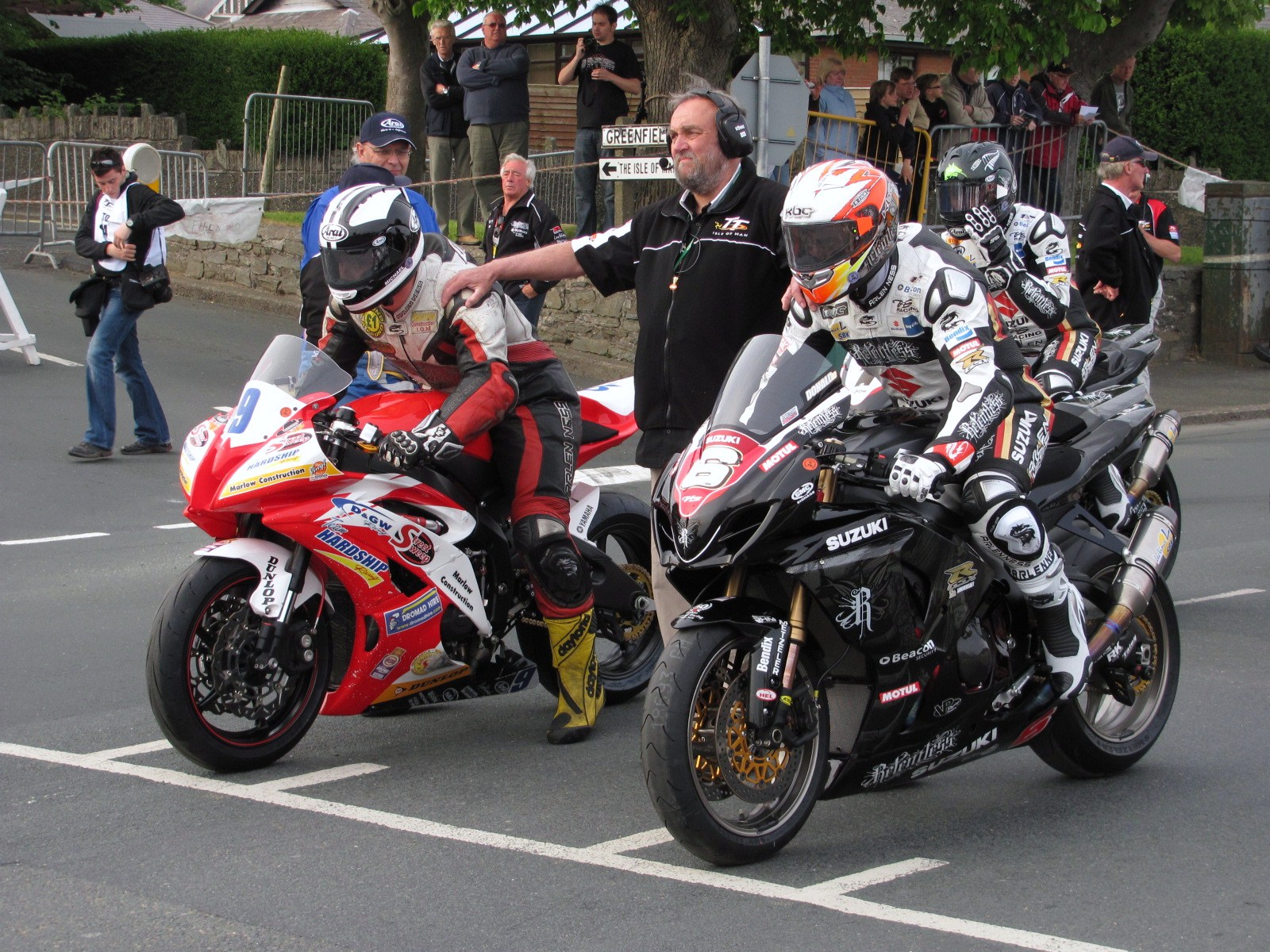
Donald (right) alongside Michael Dunlop during practice for the 2010 Isle of Man TT.

On 4 September 2007, Donald and Relentless Suzuki signed a deal together in which he would represent and race for them in 2008. The deal made was to ride at the North West 200, Isle of Man TT, Ulster Grand Prix and at selected rounds of the British Championship. This move afforded him a greater chance at International success. After his first test session with the Relentless Suzuki team, he seemed very happy with the move. "It just doesn't get any better than this – I'm rapt! I feel privileged to ride for Relentless Suzuki team and it's a great opportunity for me. Once we'd sorted out the deal I was anxious to get out on track and try the bikes. We all know how good the supersport and superstock Suzukis are, but when I came in after riding the superbike I couldn't stop smiling. I just thought, I can definitely win on this bike. I haven't stopped smiling to be honest. It's a new challenge for me and I'm also really looking forward to riding at the British circuits in 2008."

== 2008 season ==
This season had been Donald's most successful to date. He achieved his first podiums at the North West 200, finishing in third place in the Superstock race, and a close second in the main Superbike race, being passed by Steve Plater at the Juniper Chicane on the last lap.

Despite missing the 2007 TT through injury, Donald returned to the island and won his first ever TT races. He won the opening Superbike race and also the Superstock race. He was in contention for the blue riband event as well, the Senior TT, but his bike suffered an oil leak while he was leading, forcing him to surrender the lead to John McGuinness. He managed to hold on to second place to cap a great week for himself and the Relentless Suzuki by TAS Racing Team.

== 2015 season ==
Donald joined the Valvoline Racing by Padgetts Honda Team to contest the 2015 Isle of Man TT races in the 600 cc Supersport class, and rode Nortons in the Superbike and Senior classes.

== Career statistics ==
=== British Superbike Championship ===
(key) (Races in bold indicate pole position; races in italics indicate fastest lap)

Year	Class	Bike	1		2		3		4		5		6		7		8		9		10		11		12		13		Pos	Pts
Year	Class	Bike	R1	R2	R1	R2	R1	R2	R1	R2	R1	R2	R1	R2	R1	R2	R1	R2	R1	R2	R1	R2	R1	R2	R1	R2	R1	R2	Pos	Pts
2004	BSB	Suzuki	SIL	SIL	BHI	BHI	SNE	SNE	OUL	OUL	MON; 18	MON; 15	THR; 18	THR; 15	BHGP	BHGP	KNO	KNO	MAL	MAL	CRO	CRO	CAD	CAD	OUL	OUL	DON	DON	34th	2
