= William Dunlop (motorcyclist) =

British motorcycle racer (1985-2018)

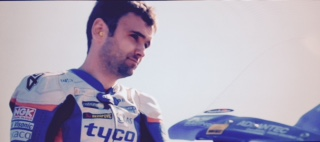
- Dunlop at the North West 200
- Nationality: Northern Irish
- Born: 23 July 1985
- Died: 7 July 2018 (aged 32)
Motorcycle racing career statistics
250cc World Championship
Active years	2009
Manufacturers	Honda
Starts / Wins / Podiums / Poles / F. laps / Points; 1 / 0 / 0 / 0 / 0 / 0
Isle of Man TT career
TTs contested	9 (2006–2007, 2009–2017)
TT wins	0
TT podiums	6

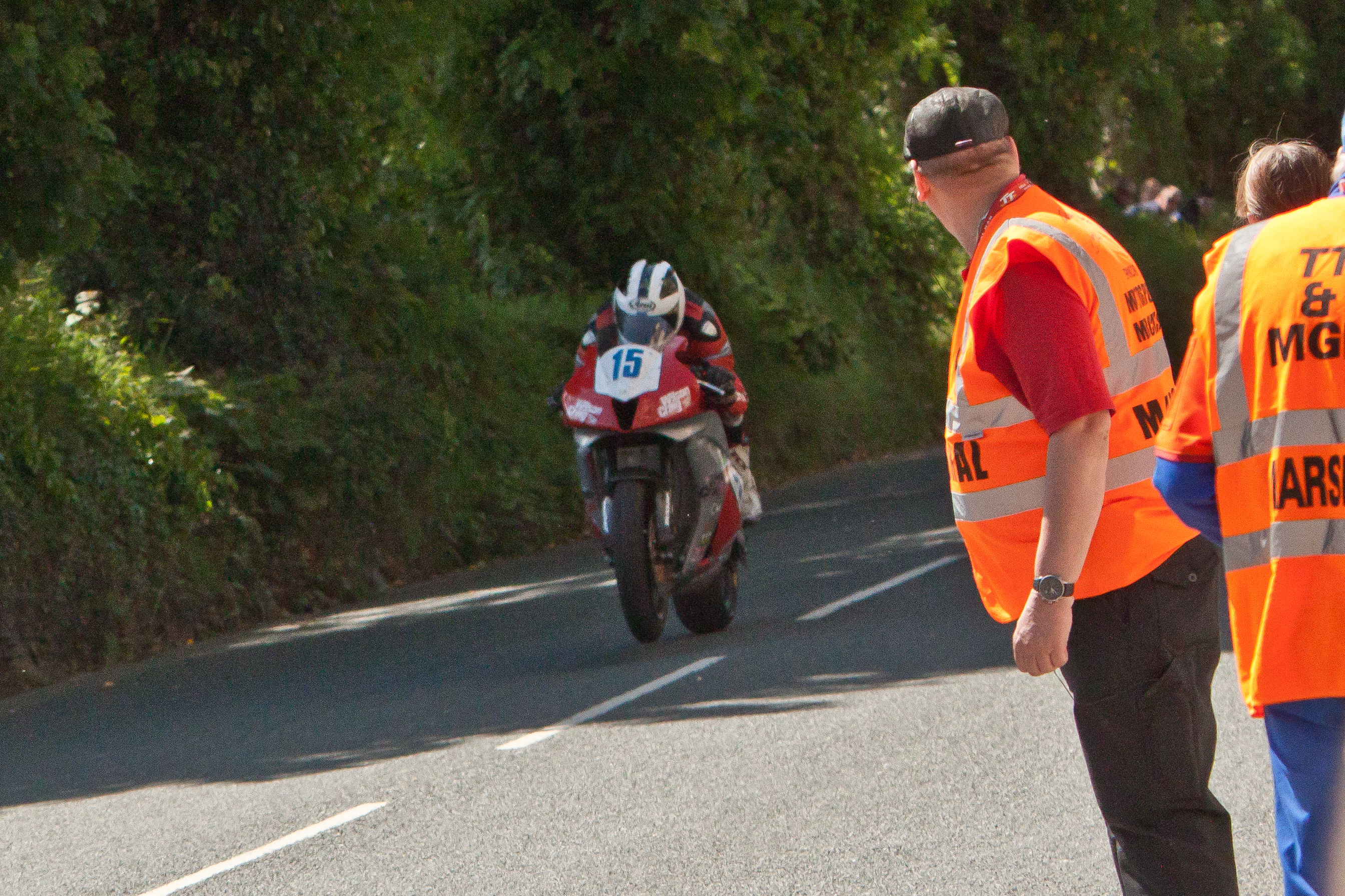
Dunlop at the Sulby Straight, the fastest point on the Isle of Man TT course, riding a 600 Honda on his way to a podium finish in 2012 Supersport Race 1

William Dunlop (23 July 1985 – 7 July 2018) was a professional motorcycle racer from Northern Ireland. Part of a motorcycle racing dynasty, William was the elder brother of Michael Dunlop; both were sons of the late Robert Dunlop, and nephews of the late Joey Dunlop. He died as a result of a crash during practice for the Skerries 100 road races in County Dublin, Republic of Ireland.

== Career ==
Dunlop started racing 125 cc bikes in 2000 when he was 15 years old. During his racing career, he accumulated 108 Irish National Road Race wins.

Dunlop also achieved numerous victories at two of Ireland's prestigious road racing events, the North West 200 (4) and the Ulster Grand Prix (7). His best results at the Isle of Man TT saw him securing the third tier on the podium on four occasions with his best result being the runner up position in the 2016 TT Zero.

Until late 2015, Dunlop had raced for Tyco BMW Motorrad Racing campaigning the BMW S1000RR and a Suzuki GSX-R600. The 2016 season saw him competing at the main International Road Races aboard Yamaha YZF-R1 and Yamaha YZF-R6 in the Superbike and Supersport categories.

Dunlop campaigned a Kawasaki ZX-10R Superstock machine, provided by a different team, during selected rounds of the British Championship.

Dunlop competed in eleven TT race seasons between 2006 and 2017, with a second place and four third places being his best results, in the 125 cc, SuperSport and Classic races. He won two races at the North West 200 with his first victory being in the 2009 250 cc event. 2009 also saw Dunlop take part in the last ever 250cc Grand Prix race at Valencia finishing 18th on a P J Flynn Bigman Racing Honda.

== 2014 ==
Dunlop crashed his Tyco Suzuki Superbike in the final race of the week at the 2014 Isle of Man TT, during the Senior TT event. He led the race on time briefly during the first lap, but ran wide through the Graham Memorial corner on the mountain section on the third lap, running off the road up against the adjacent embankment, resulting in two fractures to his left leg.

== 2015 ==
Dunlop won two races at a rain-soaked Tandragee 100. In the Supersport Class, Dunlop put in a very convincing performance on board the CD Racing Yamaha YZF-R6 and rounded the meeting off by taking victory in the Senior Open Race on the TAS BMW S1000RR.

Dunlop topped the Duke Road Racing Rankings in 2015 and therefore became the season's Champion and received the Geoff Duke Trophy, only two years apart from his younger brother Michael, who did so in 2013.

== Death ==
Dunlop sustained fatal head injuries on 7 July 2018 as a result of a crash during practice for the Skerries 100 Road Races in County Dublin. His Yamaha YZF-R1 bike spilled oil from the engine sump onto the back wheel, and as a result, Dunlop lost control and crashed into a ditch and trees at the Sam's Tunnel part of the circuit. In 2023, a jury at the inquest into Dunlop's death returned a verdict of misadventure.

Dunlop's funeral was held on 11 July at Garryduff Presbyterian Church near his hometown of Ballymoney. Following the service, he was buried alongside his father, Robert, in the church’s graveyard.

On 25 February 2022, a statue of Dunlop was unveiled in the Memorial Gardens in Ballymoney, where it now stands, along with memorials to his father, Robert, and uncle, Joey.

== Career statistics ==
=== By season ===
Season	Class	Motorcycle	Team	Number	Race	Win	Podium	Pole	FLap	Pts	Plcd
2009	250cc	Honda	Bigman Racing	33	1	0	0	0	0	0	NC
Total					**1**	**0**	**0**	**0**	**0**	**0**	

=== Races by year ===
Year	Class	Bike	1	2	3	4	5	6	7	8	9	10	11	12	13	14	15	16	Pos	Points
2009	250cc	Honda	QAT	JPN	SPA	FRA	ITA	CAT	NED	GER	GBR	CZE	INP	RSM	POR	AUS	MAL	VAL; 18	NC	0

=== British 125 Championship ===
Year	Bike	1	2	3	4	5	6	7	8	9	10	11	12	13	Pos	Pts
2010	Honda	BRH; 6	THR; 5	OUL; 10	CAD; 7	MAL; 17	KNO; C	SNE	BRH	CAD	CRO	CRO	SIL	OUL	**17th**	**36**

=== British Supersport Championship ===
Year	Bike	1		2		3		4		5		6		7		8		9		10		11		12			Pos	Pts
Year	Bike	R1	R2	R1	R2	R1	R2	R1	R2	R1	R2	R1	R2	R1	R2	R1	R2	R1	R2	R1	R2	R1	R2	R1	R2	R3	Pos	Pts
2011	Honda	BRH	BRH	OUL	OUL	CRO	CRO	THR	THR	KNO	KNO	SNE	SNE	OUL	OUL; C	BRH	BRH	CAD	CAD	DON	DON	SIL; 22	SIL; 17	BRH	BRH	BRH	**NC**	**0**

=== British Superbike Championship ===
(key) (Races in bold indicate pole position; races in italics indicate fastest lap)

Year	Make	1		2		3			4		5		6			7		8			9			10		11		12			Pos	Pts
Year	Make	R1	R2	R1	R2	R1	R2	R3	R1	R2	R1	R2	R1	R2	R3	R1	R2	R1	R2	R3	R1	R2	R3	R1	R2	R1	R2	R1	R2	R3	Pos	Pts
2018	Yamaha	DON; 27	DON; Ret	BHI	BHI	OUL	OUL		SNE	SNE	KNO	KNO	BHGP	BHGP		THR	THR	CAD	CAD		SIL	SIL	SIL	OUL	OUL	ASS	ASS	BHGP	BHGP	BHGP	NC	0

== Complete TT record ==
2018	Superbike TT DNF						
2017	Superbike TT 9	Supersport 1 TT 4	Superstock TT 7	Senior TT 10			
2016	Superbike TT DNF	Supersport 1 TT 7	Superstock TT 8	Supersport 2 TT DNF	TT Zero 2	Senior TT DNF	
2015	Superbike TT 5	Supersport TT 1 DNF					
2014	Superbike TT 6	Supersport TT 1 5	Superstock TT DNF	Supersport TT 2 3	Senior TT DNF		
2013	Superbike TT 9	Supersport TT 1 3	Supersport TT 2 4	Superstock TT 9	Senior TT 7		
2012	Superbike TT 6	Supersport TT 1 3	Superstock TT DNF	Supersport TT 2 DNF	Lightweight TT 6	Senior TT Cancelled	
2011	Superbike TT 7	Superstock TT 5	Supersport TT 2 DNF	Senior TT 8			
2010	Superbike TT DNF	Supersport TT 1 6	Superstock TT 16	Supersport TT 2 7	Senior TT DNF		
2009	Ultra Lightweight 125 TT 4	Lightweight 250 TT DNF	Superstock TT 11	Supersport TT 1 9	Supersport TT 2 DNF	Superbike TT 12	Senior TT DNF
2007	Supersport TT DNF	Senior TT 34					
2006	Supersport TT 26	Senior TT 35					

== See also ==
- Robert Dunlop
- Joey Dunlop
- Michael Dunlop
- 2009 Grand Prix motorcycle racing season
- North West 200
- Isle of Man TT
- Road (2014 film)
- Isle of Man
