= Alastair Seeley =

Northern Irish motorcycle racer

- Nationality: Northern Irish
- Born: 4 October 1979 (age 47); Carrickfergus, County Antrim Northern Ireland
- Current team: Synetiq BMW

Alastair Seeley (born 4 October 1979) is a motorcycle road racer from Carrickfergus, Northern Ireland. At the close of the North West 200 2023, Seeley had won a record 29 races in the event. He competes in the Superstock 1000 class for Northern Ireland based Synetiq BMW.

In 2021, Seeley competed in Northern Ireland, winning the Ulster Superbike and Supersport Championships.

During 2017, Seeley competed in the inaugural British GP2 category within the British Supersport National Championship riding a Spirit motorcycle having a Triumph 675 engine.

Seeley competed in the 2016 British Superbike Championship aboard a BMW S1000R, having switched from Tyco BMW in the Superstock class. He was the 2009 British Superstock champion and the 2011 British Supersport champion, and also has a strong record in road racing.

== Early career ==
Seeley began circuit racing in 2000 in club events in Northern Ireland. In 2002, he racked up 20 wins, including his first national 125cc win and several 600 and Open class wins. His main 2003 focus was the Regal Championship, in which he regularly finished in the top-ten, while he also won the Wirral Club Wales 600 and Powerbike Championship.

Seeley first came to wider attention by taking two wins in the 600cc class of the British Superbike Championship's Mondello Park round in 2004. That year, he also made his first appearance at the North West 200, and won a 6-hour Pembury endurance race for Team Twilight. In 2005, he won the Irish Superbike Championship and contested in various other races. He successfully defended this in 2006, also winning the Irish Supersport title and taking two top-five finishes in the 600cc class at the North West 200. He also did some racing in America.

== Move to racing in Great Britain ==
=== Superstock 1000 ===
For 2007, Seeley moved to England finishing tenth overall in the British Superstock Championship on a Yamaha. He improved to fourth in 2008, also taking his first North West 200 victory in the Superstock class and winning the Monarch of Mondello title for the biggest payday of his career. In 2009, he dominated the championship for the Relentless TAS Suzuki team, winning the first nine rounds and sealing the title with three rounds to spare, regularly setting what would be competitive lap times on a Superbike. He finished the season with two outings on an Evo Class Suzuki GSX-R1000, doing enough to earn a full-time ride for them in the main class.

=== British Superbike Championship 2010 ===
Seeley made a flying start to his 2010 campaign, qualifying third and finishing third and fourth in the opening meeting at the Brands Hatch Indy circuit. He scored consistent points in the early part of the season, although his second podium did not come until round 13 at Snetterton. He took his first win at the Brands Hatch Grand Prix circuit, in a rain-affected race, before failing to finish in the two Sunday races.

=== British Supersport Championship 2011– ===
For 2011, Seeley chose to stay with Relentless TAS Suzuki which meant that he was demoted to the supersport class.

== Career statistics ==
Stats correct as of 9 July 2012

=== All Time ===
Series	Years active	Races	Poles	Podiums	Wins	2nd place	3rd place	Fast Laps	Titles
Superstock 1000	^{2009}	21	7	12	9	0	3	7	1
British Superbike (BSB)	^{2009–10, 2012–}	43	2	4	1	1	2	3	0
British Supersport (BSS)	^{2011}	24	8	18	9	8	1	9	1
Total		88	17	34	19	9	6	19	2

=== By championship ===
==== AMA Formula Xtreme Championship ====
Year	Class	Bike	1	2	3	4	5	6	7	8	9	10	11	Pos	Pts
2006	Formula Xtreme	Yamaha	DAY; Ret	BAR; 26	FON	INF	RAM; 9	MIL	LAG	OHI; 14	VIR; 12	RAT	OHI	21st	63

=== AMA Supersport Championship ===
==== By year ====
Year	Class	Bike	1	2	3	4	5	6	7	8	9	10	11	Pos	Pts
2006	Supersport	Yamaha	DAY; 9	BAR; 16	FON	INF; C	RAM; 16	MIL	LAG	OHI; 12	VIR; 12	RAT	OHI	17th	90

=== AMA Superbike Championship ===
Year	Class	Team	1	2		3		4		5		6		7	8		9		10		11	Pos	Pts
Year	Class	Team	R1	R1	R2	R1	R2	R1	R2	R1	R2	R1	R2	R1	R1	R2	R1	R2	R1	R2	R1	Pos	Pts
2008	SuperBike	Suzuki	DAY	BAR	BAR	FON	FON	INF	INF	MIL	MIL	RAM; 10	RAM; 9	LAG	OHI	OHI	VIR	VIR	RAT	RAT	LAG	23rd	43

==== National Superstock 1000 ====
Year	Bike	1	2	3	4	5	6	7	8	9	10	11	12	Pos	Pts	Ref
2008	Yamaha	THR; 7	OUL; 4	BHGP; 4	DON; 4	SNE; 3	OUL; Ret	OUL; 6	KNO; 9	CAD; DNS	CRO; 5	SIL; 16	BHI; 3	4th	108	
2009	Yamaha	BHI; 1												1st	241	
2009	Suzuki		OUL; 1	DON; 1	THR; 1	SNE; 1	KNO; 1	KNO; 1	BHGP; 1	CAD; 1	CRO; 3	SIL	OUL	1st	241	

==== British Superbike Championship ====
Year	Bike	1		2		3			4		5		6			7			8			9		10		11		12			Pos	Pts	Ref
Year	Bike	R1	R2	R1	R2	R1	R2	R3	R1	R2	R1	R2	R1	R2	R3	R1	R2	R3	R1	R2	R3	R1	R2	R1	R2	R1	R2	R1	R2	R3	Pos	Pts	Ref
2009	Suzuki	BHI	BHI	OUL	OUL	DON	DON		THR	THR	SNE	SNE	KNO	KNO		MAL	MAL		BHGP	BHGP	BHGP	CAD	CAD	CRO	CRO	SIL; Ret	SIL; 10	OUL; Ret	OUL; 13	OUL; DNS	32nd	9	
2010	Suzuki	BHI; 4	BHI; 3	THR; 12	THR; 9	OUL; 4	OUL; 6		CAD; 9	CAD; 7	MAL; 10	MAL; 11	KNO; 5	KNO; C		SNE; 5	SNE; 3	SNE; Ret	BHGP; 1	BHGP; Ret	BHGP; Ret	CAD; 8	CAD; 9	CRO; Ret	CRO; 15	SIL; 6	SIL; 4	OUL; 15	OUL; 5	OUL; 7	6th^{1}	550	
2012	Suzuki	BHI; 2	BHI; C	THR; 15	THR; 21	OUL; 4	OUL; 6	OUL; 11	SNE; 16	SNE; 16	KNO; 7	KNO; 7	OUL; Ret	OUL; 8	OUL; 13	BHGP; 9	BHGP; 11		CAD; 14	CAD; 13		DON; DNS	DON; Ret	ASS; 19	ASS; 20	SIL; 17	SIL; 18	BHGP; 19	BHGP; Ret	BHGP; 19	13th	95	

===== Notes =====
1. – Seeley qualified for "The Showdown" part of the BSB season, thus before the Croft round he was awarded 500 points plus the podium credits he had gained throughout the season. Podium credits are given to anyone finishing 1st, 2nd or 3rd, with 3,2 and 1 points awarded respectively.

==== British Supersport Championship ====
Year	Bike	1		2		3		4		5		6		7		8		9		10		11		12			Pos	Pts	Ref
Year	Bike	R1	R2	R1	R2	R1	R2	R1	R2	R1	R2	R1	R2	R1	R2	R1	R2	R1	R2	R1	R2	R1	R2	R1	R2	R3	Pos	Pts	Ref
2011	Suzuki	BRH; Ret	BRH; 1	OUL; 2	OUL; 2	CRO; 5	CRO; 4	THR; 2	THR; Ret	KNO; 2	KNO; 2	SNE; 1	SNE; 1	OUL; 3	OUL; C	BRH; 1	BRH; 1	CAD; 2	CAD; 2	DON; 1	DON; 1	SIL; 1	SIL; 1	BRH; Ret	BRH; 2	BRH; 1	1st	450	

Year	Make	1		2		3			4		5		6			7		8			9			10		11		12			Pos	Pts
Year	Make	R1	R2	R1	R2	R1	R2	R3	R1	R2	R1	R2	R1	R2	R3	R1	R2	R1	R2	R3	R1	R2	R3	R1	R2	R1	R2	R1	R2	R3	Pos	Pts
2016	BMW	SIL; Ret	SIL; 14	OUL; 5	OUL; Ret	BHI; 17	BHI; 14		KNO; 15	KNO; 18	SNE; 14	SNE; Ret	THR; Ret	THR; 22		BHGP; 16	BHGP; 18	CAD; 15	CAD; 16		OUL; Ret	OUL; 15	OUL; 13	DON; Ret	DON; DNS	ASS; 21	ASS; Ret	BHGP; 9	BHGP; 12	BHGP; 13	21st	37
2017	BMW	DON	DON	BHI	BHI	OUL; 17	OUL; Ret		KNO	KNO	SNE	SNE	BHGP	BHGP		THR	THR	CAD	CAD		SIL	SIL	SIL	OUL	OUL	ASS	ASS	BHGP	BHGP	BHGP	NC	0
