= 2007 Isle of Man TT =

Annual motorcycle racing event

2007 Isle of Man TT Races
- Isle of Man TT Mountain Course layout

Race details
- Date: 26 May – 8 June 2007
- Location: Douglas, Isle of Man
- Course: Isle of Man TT Mountain Course; 37.73 mi / 60.20 km

Senior TT
Pole Position	Fastest Lap
(England) John McGuinness	(England) John McGuinness
129.085 mph	130.354 mph
Podium
1. (England) John McGuinness
2. (England) Guy Martin	3. (England) Ian Hutchinson

Junior TT 600 cc
Pole Position	Fastest Lap
(England) John McGuinness	(England) Guy Martin
122.423 mph	125.161 mph
Podium
1. (England) Ian Hutchinson
2. (England) John McGuinness	3. (England) Guy Martin

Superstock TT
Pole Position	Fastest Lap
(England) Ian Hutchinson	(New Zealand) Bruce Anstey
125.570 mph	128.400 mph
Podium
1. (New Zealand) Bruce Anstey
2. (England) John McGuinness	3. (England) Ian Hutchinson

Senior TT winner John McGuinness at Rhencullen

The 2007 Isle of Man Tourist Trophy was the Centenary race event held from 26 May to 8 June 2007.

The Blue Riband race of the meeting, the Senior TT was won by John McGuinness recording the first lap at an average speed of 130 mph lap of the Isle of Man TT Mountain Course. The Superstock TT race of the Centenary meeting was won by Bruce Anstey and the 600cc Junior TT race by Ian Hutchinson. The Sidecar TT Races A & B were both won by the combination of Dave Molyneux/Rick Long and John McGuinness also completed a double after winning the Superbike TT race. During the Senior TT race, a race accident resulted in the death of a competitor and two spectators. A further serious race accident occurred during the Post TT race with a race competitor and four spectators being injured.

For the 2007 Centenary TT Races, a number of special events where held to commemorate 100 years of the Isle of Man TT Races. This include a Centenary TT race re-enactment, a display by the Battle of Britain Memorial Flight over Douglas Bay and a music festival with the headline act of the UK group The Who. The 2007 Isle of Man TT race festival was the first event that a one-way traffic flow was introduced on the mountain section of A18 Snaefell Mountain Road between Ramsey Hairpin and the Creg-ny-Baa road junction.

== Centenary Re-enactment ==
To celebrate the first 1907 Isle of Man TT held on 28 May of that year, a special Re-enactment of the 1907 event was held on the village green next to Tynwald Hill in St. Johns on Monday 28 May 2007. The vintage parade of 100 classic motor-cycles for the Centenary Re-enactment of one lap on closed public roads on the original St. John's Short Course were flagged away by former FIM World Motor-Cycle Champion Geoff Duke. The first of the participants to start the Re-enactment parade was Dr George Cohen riding the recently restored twin-cylinder Peugeot-Norton. ridden by Rem Fowler during the first Isle of Man TT Race in 1907. Also participating in the 2007 Re-enactment were former TT competitors including Alan Cathcart, Sammy Miller, Guy Martin, Nick Jefferies and Mick Grant.

== Practice week ==
The first two competitors to start practice for the Centenary event from the TT Grandstand included Steve Plater and Keith Amor on their Solo Newcomers' speed control lap followed by an untimed practice session for Solo competitors and sidecar crews.

Despite the 2007 Isle of Man TT being the first practice and races not interrupted by the weather since the Golden Jubilee event of 1957, after the cancellation of the Wednesday evening practice. The Australian TT rider Cameron Donald is forced to miss the 2007 Isle of Man TT Races after breaking a collar-bone while competing during the 2007 North West 200 Superbike Race. Carl Rennie was also forced to miss the 2007 Isle of Man TT Races included after breaking a collar bone at the Cookstown 100 Races.

During Monday's evening practice session, Ian Hutchinson riding for Honda recorded a speed of 192.838 mph through the speed trap in Sulby. Also during Monday opening practice, TT riders Steve Pooley and Andy King slipped off at the 32nd Milestone suffering minor abrasions to hand and arms. At Laurel Bank, Ian Hutchinson suffered an injury to an elbow. After an accident at the Water Works Corner near Ramsey, Marc Ramsbotham was taken to Nobles Hospital for an X-Ray for a suspected injury.

Tuesday's evening practice is held in slightly overcast conditions and John McGuinness riding a Honda in the Superbike class records a lap at an average speed 128.492 mph to lead practice. The practice times for Supersport and Superstock classes are both led by New Zealander Bruce Anstey recording lap times of 121.33 mph (Yamaha) and 125.34 mph (Suzuki) respectively. The sidecar class is dominated by Nick Crowe/Dan Sayle riding a 600cc Honda outfit recording a lap of 114.208 mph. The sidecar of Dave Molyneux / Rick Long stopped on Bray Hill on the first Sidecar TT practice lap with continuing mechanical problems. At the Quarterbridge, Karsten Schmidt slipped off during Tuesday evening practice, William Dunlop and Roger Maher at the Waterworks and Conor Cummins and Alan Chamley collided at Laurel Bank.

After the cancellation of Wednesday evening practice session due to low-lying mist on the primary A18 Mountain Road section of the TT Course the next TT Race practice was held on the evening of Thursday 31 May 2007. The traditional Thursday afternoon practice session held since 1937 was moved to an evening practice session in line with the Manx Grand Prix to increase the availability of race marshals. The Thursday evening TT practice session was dominated again by John McGuinness who posted a lap of an average speed of 129.084 mph which was slightly slower than his outright TT lap record of an average speed of 129.45 mph. The Sidecar TT practice was dominated again by the local Isle of Man crew of Nick Crowe/Dan Sayle with a lap at an average speed of 114.125 mph. At Cruickshanks corner in Ramsey, James Coward suffered fractures to the lower leg after an accident and John Crellin hit a seagull on the Mountain Section.

== Centenary TT Race Week ==
=== Superbike TT Race ===
The Superbike Race was first delayed by 30 minutes due to spilt oil at the Bungalow and then by damp-patches, low-lying mist and high winds on the Mountain Section of the course. The Superbike TT Race is postponed until Monday 4 June 2007 after the deterioration of the weather and controversy over the TT Race regulations the bans the use of hand-cut slicks. As the difficult weather conditions demanded hand-cut slick racing tyres, it was alleged that Honda would withdraw if the Superbike TT race was not postponed or that John McGuinness and Ian Hutchinson would start the race on slicks and then turn off the course at Bray Hill and return to the race paddock.

The rescheduled Superbike TT race was to be run on Monday 4 June 2007 with Michael Rutter riding a 1000cc ZX 10 Kawasaki the first competitor to start the Centenary TT Races. The first retirements were the Isle of Man competitor Nigel Beattie riding a Yamaha R1 with a broken gear-linkage at the TT Grandstand. At Crosby, Bruce Anstey also retired on lap 1 of the Superbike TT with a failed ignition amplifier on his 1000cc Suzuki and Michael Rutter with an engine failure at Isle of Man. After leading the race by 2 seconds at Glen Helen, John McGuinness records a lap-time of 17 minutes and 42.79 seconds an average speed of 127.804 for lap 1 of the Superbike race and leads Guy Martin by 4.81 seconds and Ian Hutchinson by 11.79 seconds both riding Honda motor-cycles. At Kerrowmoar, near Sulby on the first lap, local competitor Paul Hunt slipped-off and was taken to Nobles Hospital with minor injuries. By lap 2 and the first of the pit-stops at the TT Grandstand, John McGuinness leads Guy Martin in second place by 10.55 seconds and laps in 17 minutes and 38.85 seconds an average speed of 128.279 mph. Riding a Honda, Ryan Farquhar displaces Ian Lougher for 5th place with Martin Finnegan and Ian Hutchinson in 3rd and 4th places respectively. Also on lap 2, James Edmeades crashed at Ballacraine and Mark Parrett at Cruickshanks Corner in Ramsey and both were uninjured. Through the speed-trap at the TT Grandstand, John McGuinness records a speed of 172 mph on lap 3 and now leads Guy Martin by 22.06 seconds and Ian Hutchinson by 42.75 seconds in third place. Also, Ian Lougher retakes 5th place and leads Ryan Farquhar by 10.26 seconds. The damp patches on the TT Course dominated the rest of the race and John McGuinness records an average speed for lap 4 of 127.207 mph and 126.513 mph for lap 6 and wins the TT Superbike race in 1 hour and 48 minutes, 11.17 seconds at an average race speed of 125.550 mph. A finish in 10th place at an average race speed of 119.657 mph produced a silver TT replica award for TT Newcomer Steve Plater.

=== Sidecar TT Race 'A' ===
The second race of the Centenary TT Races was the Sidecar TT Race 'A' over 3 laps (113.00 miles) of the Isle of Man TT Mountain Course. The Sidecar race produced a and closely contested event with local Isle of Man competitors Nick Crowe/Dan Sayle leading from the start and quickly passing race favourites Dave Molyneux/Rick Long on the road at the 11th Milestone on lap 1. The Austrian pair of Klaus Klaffenblock/Christian Parzer retired at Ballacraine on lap 1 and this was quickly followed by race leaders Nick Crowe/Dan Sayle at Sulby Crossroads with gearbox problems. This left the Suzuki power outfit of John Holden/Andrew Winkle to lead lap 1 of the Sidecar TT Race 'A' in 20 minutes 19.56 minutes at an average race speed of 111.374 by 8.81 seconds from the sidecar outfit of Dave Molyneux/Rick Long in second place and by 10.05 seconds from the third place outfit of Simon Neary/Stuart Bond. The combination of John Holden and Andrew Winkle increased the lead to over 12 seconds at Glen Helen on lap 2. This lead was reduced to 3.78 seconds by Dave Molyneux/Rick Long in 2nd place at the Bungalow on lap 2 and to 1.86 seconds at the TT Grandstand at the end of lap. Despite the technical problems during practice and a return to racing from a serious practice accident at Rhencullen during the 2006 Isle of Man TT, the 3rd lap of Sidecar TT Race 'A' produced the fastest lap of the race in 20 minutes and 4.83 seconds by the sidecar outfit of Dave Molyneux/Rick Long an average speed of 112.738 mph. After leading the Sidecar race for 2 laps, despite lapping at an average speed of 111.959 mph, John Holden/Andrew Winkle only trailed the leaders by 3.8 seconds at the official timing-point at Ramsey Hairpin on the last lap. After a dramatic race, Dave Molyneux and Rick Long won the Sidecar TT Race 'A' by 6.5 seconds from John Holden and Andrew Winkle in 1 hour and 49.6 seconds at an average race speed of 111.688 mph. After the race Dave Molyneux said that "I would have been happy with sixth. I really rode my heart out and I have never been so committed going into bends".

=== Superstock TT Race ===
The delayed Superstock TT Race was held over to Tuesday 5 June 2007 and was over 4 laps (150.92 miles) of the Isle of Man TT Mountain Course. Despite the windy conditions, the race favourite Bruce Anstey riding a Suzuki motor-cycle established a 5-second lead at Glen Helen on lap 1 and shattered the lap record for the race from a standing start, lapping in 17 minutes and 38.70 seconds an average speed of 128.29 mph. The fast race pace and blustery windy conditions caused both Ryan Farquhar to Guy Martin to run out of fuel on lap 2 and Bruce Anstey increased the pace to produce another Superstock lap record in 17 minutes 37.85 seconds an average speed of 128.400 mph and a lead of 23.15 seconds. The Honda team-mates of John McGuinness and Ian Hutchinson occupied 2nd and 3rd places, Martin Finnegan in 4th place riding an MV Agusta motor-cycle and 5th place Conor Cummins who now held the record for the fastest local Isle of Man competitor after lapping at 18 minutes and 10.78 seconds from a standing start on lap 1 of the 2007 Superstock Race. Despite a reduce race pace which produced laps at an average speed of 121.299 mph and 125.771 mph on the 3rd and 4th laps, the New Zealander Bruce Anstey won the 2007 Superstock TT Race in 1 hour, 11 minutes and 56.29 seconds at an average race speed of 125.875 mph. The winning margin was 40.3 seconds over 2nd place John McGuinness stated that;- "....Bruce has taken Superstock racing to a new level. He pulled our pants down on the first lap and that was it". At Union Mills on the last lap, former New Zealand TT winner Shaun Harris crashed while in 13th place and was taken to Nobles Hospital with critical injuries.

=== Supersport TT Race ===
The 4 lap (150.92 miles) Supersport Junior TT race for 600cc motor-cycles, the New Zealander, Bruce Anstey initially led the Junior TT race on lap 1 at Glen Helen by 1.8 seconds from the Honda teammates of John McGuinness and Ian Hutchinson. Increasing his lead to 3 seconds at the official timing-point at Ballaugh Bridge on the first lap Bruce Anstey led John McGuinness and Guy Martin also riding a Honda replaced Ian Hutchinson for 3rd place. At Ramsey Hairpin on lap 1, Bruce Anstey riding for Suzuki had increased the lead to 3.4 seconds and completed lap 1 in 18 minutes, 14.90 seconds at an average speed of 124.055 breaking the previous lap record held by Ryan Farquhar for the 600cc Junior TT Supersport class. At Glen Helen on lap 2, Anstey increased the lead over John McGuinness to 4.47 and Guy Martin led Ian Hutchinson at the Bungalow timing-point by the small margin of three-tenths of a second. After setting a new lap record of 18 minutes, 6.27 seconds an average speed of 125.041 on lap 2, Bruce Anstey lost 23 seconds and the race lead after having to be pushed down the pit-lane after a refuelling stop by team mechanics after the Suzuki motor-cycle refused to restart immediately. Although John McGuinness led initially on lap 3, it was Honda team-mate Ian Hutchinson at Glen Helen replaced him as race leader by one-third of second and gradually pulled-out a lead of 5.03 seconds by the end of lap 3. During last lap, John McGuinness reduced the lead to 2.84 seconds at the Bungalow and Ian Hutchinson managed to hang-on to become a first-time Isle of Man TT winner in 1 hour, 13 minutes and 29.11 seconds at an average race speed of 123.225 mph. In second place was Honda teammate John McGuinness who said that "....I really enjoyed the race....but I seemed to have bad run with the back markers. I also lost one of my knee-sliders and every time I put my knee down it scraped the road". Completing a Honda 1–2–3 was Guy Martin in third place and also set a new lap record for the Supersport TT race of 18 minutes, 5.23 seconds at an average speed of 125.161 mph. Eventually finishing in 4th place was the early race leader Bruce Anstey in 1 hour, 13 minutes and 38.27 at an average race speed of 122.969 mph.

=== Sidecar TT Race 'B' ===
The 3 lap (113.00 miles) Sidecar TT Race 'B,’ the race start was delayed by 15 minutes due to a stray dog on the TT Course at the Glen Lough campsite near to the Ballagarey Corner in Crosby. The delay allowed Dave Molyneux the winner of the first sidecar TT race of the week to replace the ECU dashboard unit after his sidecar outfit suffered electrical failure while warming the engine shortly before the start of the Sidecar TT Race. It was the sidecar outfit of Nick Crowe/Dan Sayle that repeated their initial race pace from Sidecar Race 'A' and led by 14.7 seconds on lap 1 from Dave Molyneux/Rick Long and by 17 seconds from the 3rd place outfit of the Suzuki of John Holden/Andrew Winkle. The 2nd lap of the Sidecar TT race 'B' the lead for Holden /Winkle had increased to about 25 seconds and the sidecar pair of Nick Crowe/Dan Sayle also produced the fastest lap of the race in 19 minutes 24.24 seconds an average speed of 116.667 mph breaking the Sidecar TT record. On lap 3, Nick Crowe/Dan Sayle suffering engine failure at the top of the Ballahutchin Hill just outside Union Mills, followed by Klaus Klaffenblock/Christian Parzer outfit also suffering engine failure in the same area on the last lap. This handed the lead to Dave Molyneux/Rick Long to complete his 13th Sidecar TT win in 59 minutes and 39.11 seconds at an average speed of 113.851 mph. As for the initial 15 minute race delay, Dave Molyneux said that;- "It gave me just the breathing space I needed to fit the new dashboard and get the bike restarted, which it did perfectly....I’m not a big animal lover, but if I could find that dog I’d love it for life".

=== Senior TT Race ===
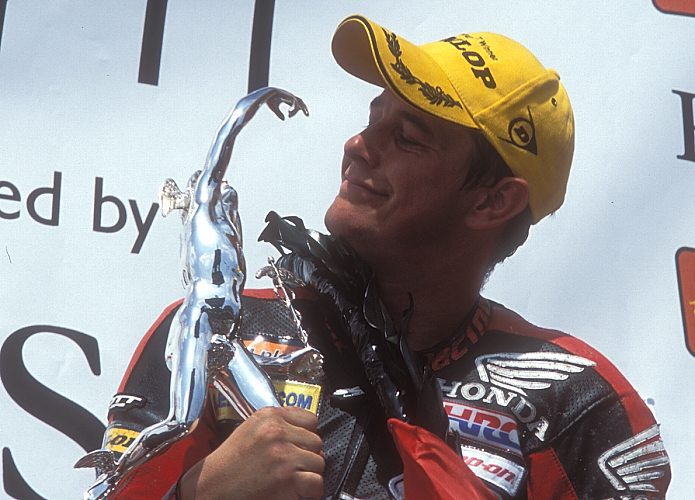
John McGuinness with the Senior Tourist Trophy

The Blue Riband event of the Isle of Man Centenary TT Race week was the Senior TT race over 6 lap (226.38 miles) of the TT Course. The first lap quickly produced retirements for three of the race favourites with Ryan Farquhar retiring at the Hawthorn near to Greeba Bridge, Martin Finnegan at Ballig and the winner of the 2007 Superstock TT Race when Bruce Anstey retired at the TT Grandstand at the end of lap 1 with handling problems. Despite cement dust on the road at Guthrie's Memorial and at Sarah's Cottage and also some low cloud on the higher sections of the Mountain Section of the course, John McGuinness completed lap 1 in a time of 17 minutes 25.77 seconds at an average speed of 129.883 mph of the 2007 Isle of Man Senior TT race and led Guy Martin in 2nd place, also riding a Honda by 10 seconds and in 3rd place Ian Hutchinson with an average speed of 128.414 mph. Although the time for lap 1 of the Senior TT was only 4.5 seconds short of an average speed of 130 mph, John McGuinness completed the second lap at a faster pace and lapped in 17 minutes, 21.99 seconds at an average speed of 130.354 mph to finally break the 130 mph speed barrier setting a new class and TT Course outright lap record.

With a pit stop at the end of lap 2, John McGuinness extended his lead over Guy Martin to 20.5 seconds at Glen Helen on lap 3. For the rest of the race, John McGuinness produced a further 3 laps of average speed of 129.296 mph, 122.867 mph and 128.207 mph to win the 2007 Centenary Senior TT Race in 1 hour, 46 minutes and 44.23 seconds at an average speed of 127.255 mph. The Senior TT Race was also completed a Honda 1–2–3 clean sweep with Guy Martin in 2nd place, 32.73 behind the winner and Ian Hutchinson in 3rd place. The Senior TT win was described by John McGuinness as;- "Absolutely amazing....If there was going to be a time to crack the 130. I knew this was it with a rolling start and just about perfect conditions."

The 2007 Senior TT Race was followed by a TT Centenary Parade of Champions which included former world motor-cycle champions, Giacomo Agostini, John Surtees and Jim Redman. The parade was also completed by World Superbike champions Carl Fogarty and Neil Hodgson and fellow superbike rider Noriyuki Haga also finishing the TT Centenary lap. After the Parade of Champions it was announced by the Isle of Man TT Race organisers that on lap 5 of the 2007 Senior TT Race that a serious incident had occurred at the 26th Milestone. As a result of an accident involving a race competitor, Marc Ramsbotham riding a Suzuki was killed along with two spectators Dean Jacob and Gregory Kenzig. The accident also resulted in injuries to TT Race marshals, Hilary Musson and Janice Phillips.

== Further events ==
The Isle of Man Constabulary investigating the deaths of a race competitor and two spectators at the 26th Milestone during the 2007 Senior TT race arrested a marshal on suspicion of manslaughter, although the individual was later released without charge. Further safety work was carried-out at the 26th Milestone for the 2007 Manx Grand Prix with the removal of part of a grass bank on the eastern-side road embankment and a new race-marshal lay-by and shelter on the western side road of the roadway.

The acting Manx Grand Prix press officer, Geoff Cannell a former Member of the House of Keys (MHK), sports broadcaster, journalist and former lead Manx Radio Isle of Man TT race commentator died on 24 September 2007 after a short illness. The Manx Motor Cycle Club (MMCC) resigned on 27 September 2007 as organiser of the TT races after contractual difficulties and problems with 2007 Isle of Man TT races, a shortage of marshals at the 2007 Manx Grand Prix and the cancellation of the subsequent 2007 Senior Manx Grand Prix.

During October 2007 the Isle of Man Department of Transport began road widening and creation of a roundabout at Braddan Bridge on the Isle of Man TT Mountain Course.

After the MMCC had anticipated a renegotiation of the terms of the contract with the Isle of Man Department of Tourism and Leisure to organise the 2008 TT races, they were surprised to discover that the contract was awarded to ACU Events Ltd, a subsidiary of the Auto-Cycle Union (ACU). It was also announced by the Isle of Man Department of Tourism and Leisure that a second 600 cc Supersport Junior TT race would be an addition to the schedule for the 2008 Isle of Man TT races, and the return of the Ultra-Lightweight TT and Lightweight TT events to be held at the Post-TT Races on the Billown circuit in Castletown.

The Isle of Man TT race Clerk of the Course, Neil Hanson, resigned on 17 January 2008 ending a 40-year involvement as a committee member of the Manx Motor Cycle Club (MMCC). The new organisers of the Isle of Man TT races had been unable to offer him a position and the ACU Events Ltd felt that a change was needed. The official press launch for the 2008 Isle of Man TT races was held on 18 February 2008 attended by regular competitors, Ian Lougher, Bruce Anstey, Ryan Farquhar, Martin Finnegan and John McGuinness. It was also announced that BSB competitor Sean Emmett and former 250 cc British Champion Jamie Robinson would compete.

The Isle of Man Department of Transport started building a new section of road for the TT Course with a link road from the Nook to Governor's Bridge using the pre-existing A18 Bemahague Road. This road widening scheme and creation of a roundabout began in February 2008 with removal of trees on the former Bemahague farm estate which includes Government House, the official residence of the Lieutenant Governor of the Isle of Man.

An inquest held by Coroner Michael Moyle gave a verdict of misadventure into the deaths of race competitor Marc Ramsbotham and spectators Dean Adrian Jacob and Gregory John Kenzig at the 26th Milestone during lap 5 of the 2007 Senior TT Race. The verdict given on 20 March 2008 by Coroner Michael Moyle is described as a "blistering attack on TT Race Management." A working group was announced on 26 March 2008 by Isle of Man Chief Minister Tony Brown to oversee lines of responsibility and TT Course improvements in response to criticism in the coroner's report. The Chief Sector Marshall for Sector 9, which included the 26th Milestone, resigned their position on 31 March 2007 due to criticism in the Coroners report. This was followed on 9 April 2008 by the Chief Course Marshal, Roger Hurst who also resigned from his position in the Isle of Man TT Marshals Association. The Minister for the Isle of Man Department of Tourism and Leisure, Adrian Earnshaw MHK, made a statement that the Isle of Man TT races have a "sound future" and "....everything possible will be done...." to address the points made in the Coroners report.

It was announced by ACU Events Ltd. on 3 April 2008 that a contract for the official course vehicles had been awarded to Audi UK in a 3-year deal to celebrate the win by the pre-war Audi satellite company DKW ridden by Ewald Kluge in the 1938 Isle of Man TT. This was followed by the resignation by the MMCC official course driver. A further contract was awarded to Yamaha UK to provide motor-cycles and support for the Isle of Man TT Travelling Marshals. The former British Superbike competitor Sean Emmett withdrew from the 2008 Isle of Man TT races after general comments made by Coroner Michael Moyle encouraging potential competitors to consider carefully their position.

The Isle of Man TT competitor Martin Finnegan was killed while racing at the Tandragee 100 Races on 3 May 2008 and this was followed by former Isle of Man TT and Manx Grand Prix winner Robert Dunlop who died in an accident on 16 May 2008 at Mather's Cross during practice for the 2008 North West 200 races.

== Practice Times ==
=== Superbike/Senior TT Leaderboard and Practice Times ===
Rank	Rider	Mon 28 May	Tues 29 May	Wed 30 May	Thurs 31 May	Fri 1 June	Mon 4 June
1	(England) John McGuinness; 1000cc Honda	18' 06.77; 124.983 mph	17' 37.09; 128.492 mph	Cancelled; No Time	17' 32.24; 129.085 mph	—— No Time	17' 42.79; 127.804 mph
2	(England) Guy Martin; 1000cc Honda	—— No Time	17' 50.10; 126.931 mph	Cancelled; No Time	17' 39.78; 128.116 mph	—— No Time	17' 47.30; 127.264 mph
3	(England) Ian Hutchinson; 1000cc Honda	18' 19.91; 123.558 mph	17' 55.70; 126.269 mph	Cancelled; No Time	17' 44.93; 127.546 mph	17' 49.10; 127.049 mph	17' 53.58; 126.519 mph
4	(Wales) Ian Lougher; 1000 Honda	18' 40.25; 121.248 mph	17' 55.05; 126.346 mph	Cancelled; No Time	17' 40.00; 128.140 mph	19' 15.32; 117.567 mph	18' 12.89; 124.283 mph
5	(Republic of Ireland) Martin Finnegan; 1000cc Honda	18' 32.27; 122.118 mph	18' 10.32; 124.576 mph	Cancelled; No Time	17' 47.06; 127.292 mph	18' 13.57; 124.206 mph	18' 08.84; 124.745 mph
6	(New Zealand) Bruce Anstey; 1000cc Suzuki	18' 51.63; 120.028 mph	19' 06.56; 118.446 mph	Cancelled; No Time	17' 54.07; 126.461 mph	17' 57.85; 126.017 mph	—— No Time
7	(England) Michael Rutter; 1000cc Suzuki	—— No Time	—— No Time	Cancelled; No Time	18' 06.60; 125.003 mph	18' 14.38; 124.114 mph	—— No Time
8	(Northern Ireland) Adrian Archibald; 1000cc Suzuki	18' 42.74; 120.979 mph	18' 14.02; 124.155 mph	Cancelled; No Time	18' 08.44; 124.791 mph	18' 13.62; 124.201 mph	—— No Time
9	(Northern Ireland) Ryan Farquhar; 1000c Honda	18' 47.06; 120.516 mph	18' 20.29; 123.447 mph	Cancelled; No Time	18' 26.68; 122.735 mph	18' 12.59; 124.317 mph	18' 38.07; 124.263 mph
10	(Isle of Man) Paul Hunt; 1000cc Yamaha	—— No Time	18' 38.62; 121.425 mph	Cancelled; No Time	18' 16.20; 123.908 mph	—— No Time	—— No Time

Fastest Practice Laps Superbike TT/Senior TT

== Race results ==
=== 2007 Superbike TT final standings. ===
4 June 2007 6 Laps (236.38 Miles) Isle of Man TT Mountain Course.

Rank	Rider	Team	Speed	Time
1	(England) John McGuinness	Honda 1000cc	125.550 mph	1:48.11.17
2	(England) Guy Martin	Honda 1000cc	125.051 mph	1:48.37.11
3	(England) Ian Hutchinson	Honda 1000cc	124.284 mph	1:49.17.33
4	(Republic of Ireland) Martin Finnegan	Honda 1000cc	123.936 mph	1:49.35.71
5	(Wales) Ian Lougher	Honda 1000cc	123.843 mph	1:50.34.23
6	(Northern Ireland) Ryan Farquhar	Suzuki 1000cc	122.464 mph	1:50.54.77
7	(Northern Ireland) Adrian Archibald	Suzuki 1000cc	121.869 mph	1:51.27.25
8	(Isle of Man) Conor Cummins	Yamaha 1000cc	120.933 mph	1:52.19.0
9	(England) Ian Armstrong	Yamaha 1000cc	120.066 mph	1:53.07.65
10	(England) Steve Plater	Yamaha 1000cc	119.657 mph	1:53.30.84

Fastest Lap: John McGuinness – 128.279 mph (206.445 km/h) (18' 38.35) on lap 2.

=== Sidecar TT Race 'A' final standings ===
4 June 2007 3 laps (113.00 miles) Isle of Man TT Mountain Course.

Rank	Rider	Team	Speed	Time
1	(Isle of Man) Dave Molyneux/Rick Long	Honda 600cc	111.688 mph	1:00.49.06
2	(England) John Holden/Andrew Winkle	Suzuki 600cc	111.470 mph	1.00.55.56
3	(England) Steve Norbury/Scott Parnell	Yamaha 600cc	110.737 mph	1:01.19.73
4	(England) Simon Neary/Stuart Bond	Yamaha 600cc	110.038 mph	1:01.43.11
5	(England) Allan Scofield/Peter Founds	Suzuki 600cc	109.983 mph	1:01.44.97
6	(England) Nigel Connole/Jamie Winn	Honda 600cc	108.946 mph	1:02.20.23
7	(England) Conrad Harrison/Kerry Williams	Honda 600cc	108.589 mph	1:02.32.54
8	(England) Tony Elmer/Darren Marshall	Yamaha 600cc	108.101 mph	1:02.49.49
9	(Isle of Man) Glyn Jones/Chris Lake	Honda 600cc	107.286 mph	1:03.18.12
10	(England) Andrew Laidlow/Patrick Farrance	Suzuki 600cc	107.227 mph	1:03.20.19

Fastest Lap: Dave Molyneux/Rick Long – 112.736 mph (181.431 km/h) (20' 04.83) on lap 3.

=== 2007 Superstock TT final standings ===
5 June 2007 4 Laps (150.73 Miles) Isle of Man TT Mountain Course.

Rank	Rider	Team	Speed	Time
1	(New Zealand) Bruce Anstey	Suzuki 1000cc	125.875 mph	1:11.56.29
2	(England) John McGuinness	Honda 1000cc	124.710 mph	1:12.36.59
3	(England) Ian Hutchinson	Honda 1000cc	124.075 mph	1:12.58.91
4	(Republic of Ireland) Martin Finnegan	MV Agusta 1000cc	123.519 mph	1:13.81.61
5	(Isle of Man) Conor Cummins	Yamaha 1000cc	122.360 mph	1:14.00.26
6	(England) Mark Parrett	Yamaha 1000cc	122.267 mph	1:14.03.65
7	(England) James McBride	Yamaha 1000cc	121.787 mph	1:14.21.17
8	(England) Ian Pattinson	Suzuki 1000cc	121.695 mph	1:14.24.54
9	(Isle of Man) Gary Carswell	Suzuki 1000cc	120.953 mph	1:14.51.91
10	(England) Daniel Stewart	Yamaha 1000cc	120.953 mph	1:14.51.91

Fastest Lap: Bruce Anstey – 128.400 mph (206.640 km/h) (17' 37.85) on lap 2.

=== 2007 Supersport Junior TT final standings ===
6 June 2007 4 Laps (150.73 Miles) Isle of Man TT Mountain Course.

Rank	Rider	Team	Speed	Time
1	(England) Ian Hutchinson	Honda 600cc	123.225 mph	1:13.29.11
2	(England) John McGuinness	Honda 600cc	123.145 mph	1:13.31.95
3	(England) Guy Martin	Honda 600cc	123.035 mph	1:13.35.92
4	(New Zealand) Bruce Anstey	Suzuki 600cc	122.969 mph	1:13.38.27
5	(Isle of Man) Nigel Beattie	Yamaha 600cc	120.640 mph	1:15.03.59
6	(Isle of Man) Conor Cummins	Yamaha 600cc	120.446 mph	1:15.10.08
7	(Northern Ireland) Ryan Farquhar	Kawasaki 600cc	120.349 mph	1:15.14.46
8	(England) Steve Plater	Yamaha 600cc	120.337 mph	1:15.14.93
9	(England) Chris Palmer	Honda 600cc	120.330 mph	1:15.15.20
10	(Wales) Ian Lougher	Honda 600cc	119.806 mph	1:15.34.94

Fastest Lap: Guy Martin – 125.161 mph (201.427 km/h) (18' 05.23) on lap 4.

=== Sidecar TT Race 'B' final standings ===
6 June 2007 3 laps (113.00 miles) Isle of Man TT Mountain Course.

Rank	Rider	Team	Speed	Time
1	(Isle of Man) Dave Molyneux/Rick Long	Honda 600cc	113.851 mph	59.39.11
2	(England) John Holden/Andrew Winkle	Suzuki 600cc	113.025 mph	1.00.05.26
3	(England) Steve Norbury/Scott Parnell	Yamaha 600cc	111.098 mph	1:01.07.80
4	(England) Simon Neary/Stuart Bond	Yamaha 600cc	110.638 mph	1:01.21.70
5	(England) Allan Scofield/Peter Founds	Suzuki 600cc	109.998 mph	1:01.44.80
6	(England) Nigel Connole/Jamie Winn	Honda 600cc	109.847 mph	1:01.49.55
7	(England) Conrad Harrison/Kerry Williams	Honda 600cc	109.485 mph	1:02.01.80
8	(Isle of Man) Glyn Jones/Chris Lake	Honda 600cc	108.493 mph	1:02.35.80
9	(England) Tony Elmer/Darren Marshall	Yamaha 600cc	108.445 mph	1:02.37.52
10	(England) Kenny Howles/Doug Jewell	Suzuki 600cc	107.825 mph	1:02.59.54

Fastest lap: Nick Crowe/Daniel Sayle – 116.667 mph (187.757 km/h) (19' 24.24) on lap 2.

=== 2007 Senior TT final standings ===
8 June 2007 6 Laps (236.38 Miles) Isle of Man TT Mountain Course.

Rank	Rider	Team	Speed	Time
1	(England) John McGuinness	Honda 1000cc	127.255 mph	1:46.44.23
2	(England) Guy Martin	Honda 1000cc	126.608 mph	1:47.16.96
3	(England) Ian Hutchinson	Honda 1000cc	125.677 mph	1:48.04.60
4	(Wales) Ian Lougher	Honda 1000cc	124.458 mph	1:49.08.12
5	(Northern Ireland) Adrian Archibald	Suzuki 1000cc	124.202 mph	1:49.21.61
6	(Isle of Man) Conor Cummins	Yamaha	123.708 mph	1:49.47.86
7	(England) Steve Plater	Yamaha 1000cc	123.067 mph	1:50.21.67
8	(England) Michael Rutter	Kawasaki 1000cc	122.695 mph	1:50.42.22
9	(England) Ian Armstrong	Yamaha 1000cc	121.346 mph	1:51.56.08
10	(England) James McBride	Yamaha 1000cc	121.290 mph	1:51.59.14

Fastest Lap and New Outright Course Record: John McGuinness – 130.354 mph (209.784 km/h) (17' 21.99) on lap 2.

== Bibliography ==
- "Island Racer 2007: Centenary TT Edition". Island Racer. Mortons Media Group. 2007 – via Kelsey Publishing.
- Haynes, John, ed. (2007). The Official Isle of Man TT Review 2007: Centenary TT. Sparkford, Yeovil, Somerset: Haynes Publishing. ISBN 978-1844254828.
