= 2004 Isle of Man TT =

Annual motorcycle racing event

Isle of Man TT Mountain Course

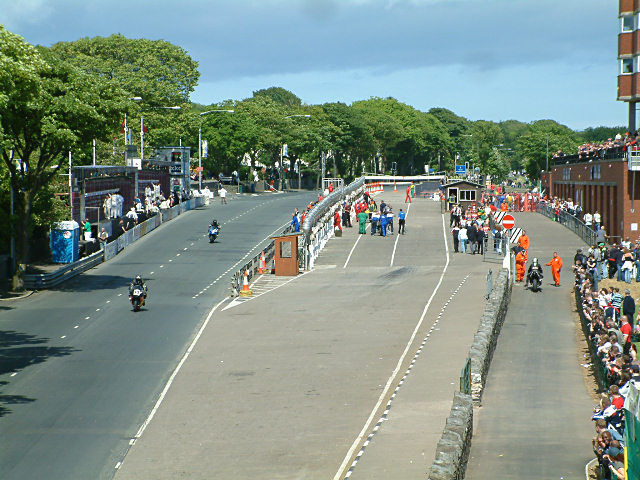
Pit-straight during the 2004 Isle of Man TT

The 2004 Isle of Man TT was the 97th edition of the event. John McGuinness won three TT races, more than anyone that year. Dave Molyneux and Daniel Sayle took the two sidecar races, while Adrian Archibald won the marquee Senior TT.

The event marked the last TT race for 125cc bikes on the Mountain Course.

Three competitors died during the event: 125cc rider Serge Le Moal and sidecar passenger Paul Cowley during practice, and Colin Breeze during the Formula One TT race.

== Results ==
=== Race 1 – Formula One TT ===
Rank	Number	Rider	Machine	Time	Speed (mph)
1	3	(England) John McGuinness	Yamaha	1 12 13.2	125.38
2	1	(Northern Ireland) Adrian Archibald	Suzuki	1 12 31.8	124.84
3	5	(New Zealand) Bruce Anstey	Suzuki	1 12 58.0	124.10
4	4	(Wales) Jason Griffiths	Yamaha	1 13 20.3	123.47
5	2	(Wales) Ian Lougher	Honda	1 13 27.7	123.26
6	8	(Northern Ireland) Richard Britton	Suzuki	1 13 53.1	122.55

=== Race 2 – Sidecar Race A ===
Rank	Number	Rider	Passenger	Machine	Time	Speed (mph)
1	1	(Isle of Man) Dave Molyneux	Daniel Sayle	DRM Honda	1 01 00.0	111.33
2	3	(Isle of Man) Nick Crowe	Darren Hope	DRM Honda	1 01 59.0	109.56
3	5	(England) Steve Norbury	Scott Parnell	Shelbourne Yamaha	1 02 51.8	108.03
4	4	(England) Roy Hanks	Dave Wells	DMR Yamaha	1 03 02.5	107.72
5	15	(England) Greg Lambert	Ivan Murray	DMR Honda	1 03 23.4	107.13
6	8	(England) Philip Dongworth	Stuart Castles	Ireson Kawasaki	1 03 44.8	106.53

=== Race 3 – Lightweight 400cc ===
Rank	Number	Rider	Machine	Time	Speed (mph)
1	41	(England) John McGuinness	Honda	1 22 06.4	110.28
2	47	(England) Steve Linsdell	Yamaha	1 22 39.6	109.54
3	49	(England) Mark Parrett	Honda	1 22 42.4	109.48
4	67	(England) Roy Richardson	Honda	1 23 02.0	109.05
5	45	(Isle of Man) Johnny Barton	Yamaha	1 23 44.8	108.12
6	48	(Isle of Man) Derran Slous	Yamaha	1 24 04.7	107.69

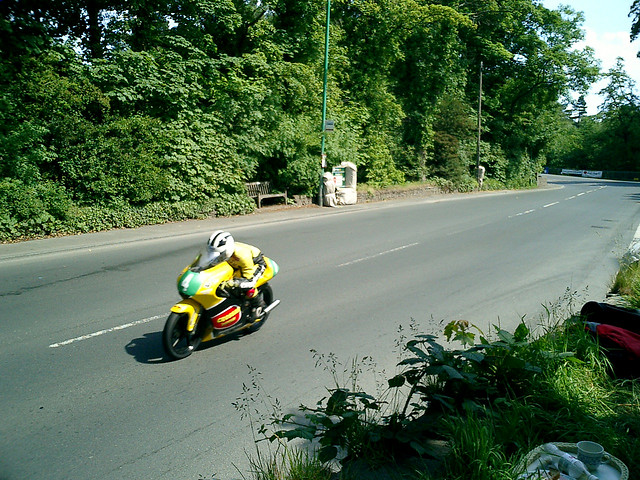
Robert Dunlop took second place for his last Isle of Man TT

=== Race 4 – Ultralightweight 125cc ===
Rank	Number	Rider	Machine	Time	Speed (mph)
1	1	(England) Chris Palmer	Honda	1 23 07.6	108.93
2	4	(Northern Ireland) Robert Dunlop	Honda	1 24 05.5	107.68
3	7	(Isle of Man) Nigel Beattie	Honda	1 25 56.4	105.36
4	6	(England) Garry Bennett	Honda	1 26 05.1	105.18
5	16	(England) Matt Jackson	Honda	1 26 20.6	104.87
6	10	(England) Mark Tyrrell	Honda	1 26 47.2	104.33

=== Race 5 - International Production 1000 ===
Rank	Number	Rider	Machine	Time	Speed (mph)
1	5	(New Zealand) Bruce Anstey	Suzuki	54 53.5	123.72
2	3	(England) John McGuinness	Yamaha	55 11.5	123.05
3	4	(Wales) Jason Griffiths	Yamaha	55 17.3	122.83
4	2	(Wales) Ian Lougher	Honda	55 22.7	122.63
5	1	(Northern Ireland) Adrian Archibald	Suzuki	55 49.5	121.65
6	8	(Northern Ireland) Richard Britton	Suzuki	56 24.5	120.39

=== Race 6 - Junior 600cc ===
Rank	Number	Rider	Machine	Time	Speed (mph)
1	3	(England) John McGuinness	Yamaha	1 15 06.0	120.57
2	5	(New Zealand) Bruce Anstey	Suzuki	1 15 23.0	120.12
3	4	(Wales) Jason Griffiths	Yamaha	1 15 45.6	119.52
4	8	(Northern Ireland) Richard Britton	Honda	1 16 10.8	118.86
5	10	(England) Mark Parrett	Yamaha	1 16 27.3	118.43
6	12	(Republic of Ireland) Martin Finnegan	Yamaha	1 16 53.9	117.75

=== Race 7 - Sidecar Race B ===
Rank	Number	Rider	Passenger	Machine	Time	Speed (mph)
1	1	(Isle of Man) Dave Molyneux	Daniel Sayle	DRM Honda	1 01 04.2	111.20
2	3	(Isle of Man) Nick Crowe	Darren Hope	DRM Honda	1 01 41.6	110.08
3	5	(England) Steve Norbury	Scott Parnell	Shelbourne Yamaha	1 02 22.3	108.88
4	4	(England) Roy Hanks	Dave Wells	DRM Honda	1 02 32.7	108.58
5	6	(England) Gary Bryan	Steven Hedison	Baker Yamaha	1 03 04.9	107.66
6	15	(England) Greg Lambert	Ivan Murray	DRM Honda	1 03 11.0	107.48

=== Race 8 - Production 600 ===
Rank	Number	Rider	Machine	Time	Speed (mph)
1	6	(Northern Ireland) Ryan Farquhar	Kawasaki	57 46.6	117.54
2	5	(New Zealand) Bruce Anstey	Suzuki	57 48.9	117.46
3	3	(England) John McGuinness	Yamaha	57 57.9	117.16
4	4	(Wales) Jason Griffiths	Yamaha	58 07.9	116.82
5	2	(Wales) Ian Lougher	Honda	58 21.1	116.38
6	7	(Republic of Ireland) Raymond Porter	Suzuki	58 44.0	115.63

=== Race 9 - Senior TT ===
Rank	Number	Rider	Machine	Time	Speed (mph)
1	1	(Northern Ireland) Adrian Archibald	Suzuki	1 13 08.1	123.81
2	5	(New Zealand) Bruce Anstey	Suzuki	1 13 38.3	122.96
3	14	(Isle of Man) Gary Carswell	Suzuki	1 15 03.3	120.64
4	10	(England) Mark Parrett	Yamaha	1 15 09.9	120.47
5	12	(Republic of Ireland) Martin Finnegan	Yamaha	1 15 10.7	120.44
6	9	(England) Chris Heath	Honda	1 15 22.1	120.14

== Bibliography ==
- "Island Racer 2004: The Inaugural TT Bookazine Edition". Island Racer. Mortons Media Group. 2004 – via Kelsey Publishing.
