= 2015 Isle of Man TT =

Annual motorcycle racing event

2015 Isle of Man TT Races
- Isle of Man TT Mountain Course layout

Race details
- Date: 30 May – 12 June 2015
- Location: Douglas, Isle of Man
- Course: Isle of Man TT Mountain Course; 37.733 mi (60.725 km)

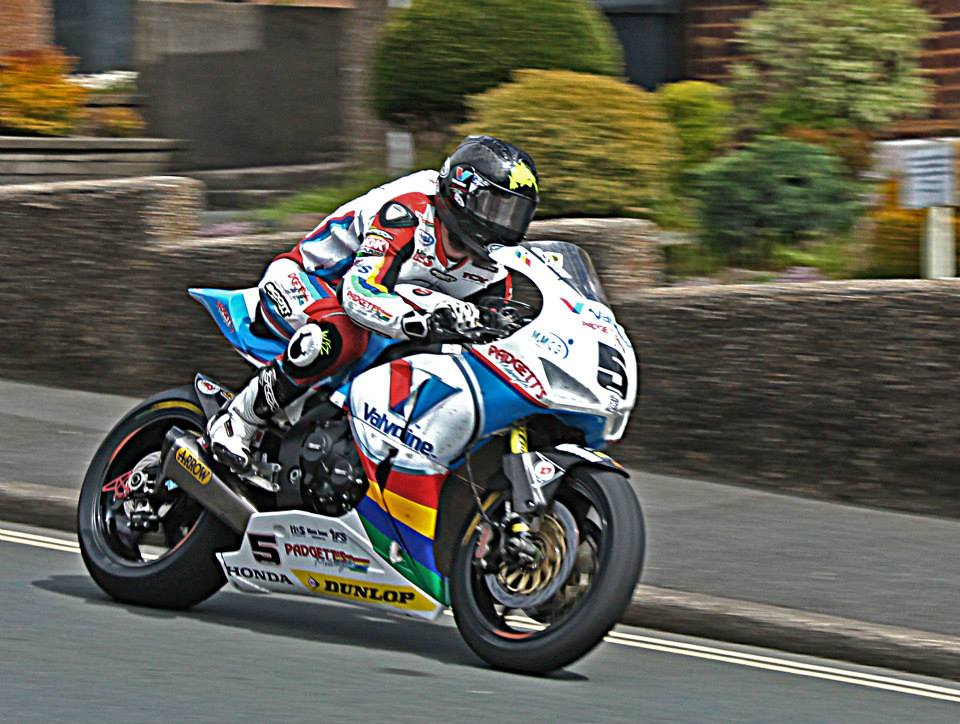
Superbike TT winner Bruce Anstey

The 2015 Isle of Man TT was held between 30 May and 12 June 2015, on the Isle of Man TT Mountain Course.

Ian Hutchinson took 3 wins in the event, more than anyone that year.

The Senior TT was red-flagged due to the career-ending accident of Jamie Hamilton. John McGuinness won the re-started race, his 23rd, and, as of 2023, last victory at the Isle of Man TT.

The event was marred by the death of 32 year-old French rider Franck Petricola during qualifying.

== Results ==
=== Superbike TT ===
Rank	Number	Rider	Machine	Time	Speed (mph)
1	5	(New Zealand) Bruce Anstey	Honda	01:45:29.902	128.749
2	9	(England) Ian Hutchinson	Kawasaki	01:45:40.879	128.526
3	2	(England) James Hillier	Kawasaki	01:46:29.410	127.550
4	1	(England) John McGuinness	Honda	01:46:42.757	127.284
5	6	(Northern Ireland) William Dunlop	BMW	01:47:41.221	126.132
6	4	(England) Michael Rutter	BMW	01:48:04.608	125.677
7	15	(Isle of Man) Dan Kneen	Honda	01:30:20.463	125.292
8	17	(England) Peter Hickman	BMW	01:30:50.199	124.608
9	13	(Northern Ireland) Lee Johnston	BMW	01:31:01.982	124.339
10	16	(Australia) David Johnson	BMW	01:31:06.559	124.235

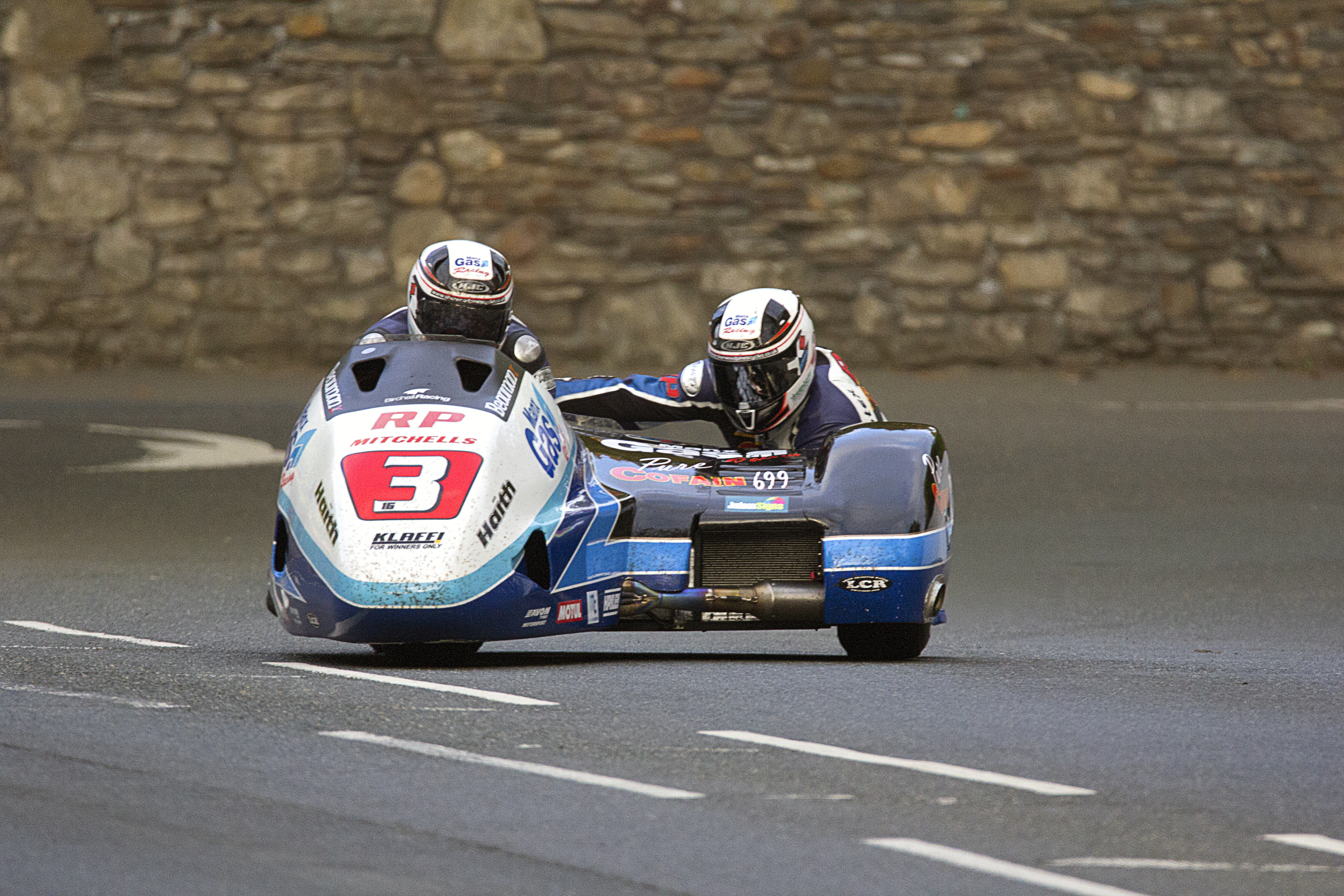
Sidecar TT 1 and 2 winners Ben Birchall & Tom Birchall (pictured in practice)

=== Sidecar TT 1 ===
Rank	Number	Rider & Passenger	Machine	Time	Speed (mph)
1	3	(England) Ben Birchall & Tom Birchall	LCR	58:39.776	115.770
2	5	(England) John Holden & (Isle of Man) Daniel Sayle	LCR Honda	59:03.889	114.982
3	2	(England) Conrad Harrison & Mike Aylott	Shelbourne Honda	59:35.636	113.961
4	8	Ian Bell & Carl Bell	LCR Yamaha	01:00:36.205	112.063
5	18	(England) Alan Founds & Tom Peters	LCR Suzuki	01:00:56.899	111.429
6	6	Gary Bryan & Jamie Winn	Baker Honda	01:00:56.906	111.429
7	11	Gary Knight & Jason Crowe	DMR Kawasaki	01:01:42.389	110.060
8	29	Matthew Dix & Shaun Parker	Baker Yamaha	01:02:10.797	109.222
9	14	Robert Handcock & Aki Aalto	Baker Honda	01:02:11.953	109.188
10	9	Wayne Lockey & Mark Sayers	Ireson Honda	01:02:19.958	108.954

=== Supersport TT 1 ===
Rank	Number	Rider	Machine	Time	Speed (mph)
1	9	(England) Ian Hutchinson	Yamaha	01:12:10.872	125.451
2	5	(New Zealand) Bruce Anstey	Honda	01:12:18.595	125.228
3	7	(England) Gary Johnson	Yamaha	01:12:35.811	124.733
4	13	(Northern Ireland) Lee Johnston	Triumph	01:12:48.591	124.368
5	8	(England) Guy Martin	Triumph	01:12:58.110	124.097
6	10	(England) James Hillier	Kawasaki	01:13:24.531	123.353
7	1	(England) John McGuinness	Honda	01:13:29.156	123.224
8	4	(Isle of Man) Conor Cummins	Honda	01:13:51.604	122.599
9	15	(Isle of Man) Dan Kneen	Honda	01:14:12.448	122.025
10	14	(England) Michael Rutter	Kawasaki	01:14:22.389	121.754

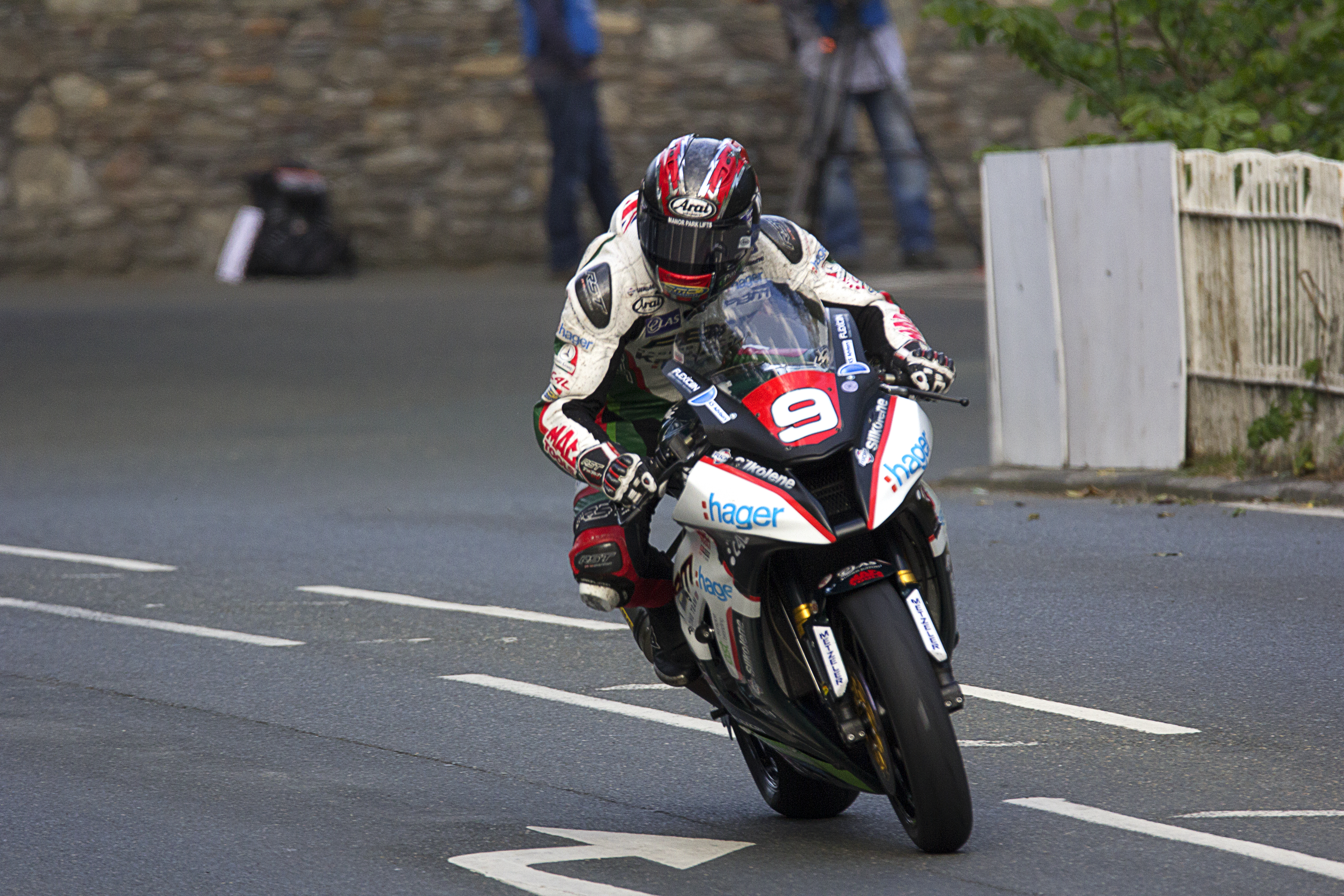
Superstock TT winner Ian Hutchinson (pictured in practice)

=== Superstock TT ===
Rank	Number	Rider	Machine	Time	Speed (mph)
1	9	(England) Ian Hutchinson	Kawasaki	01:10:05.298	129.197
2	3	(Northern Ireland) Michael Dunlop	BMW	01:10:22.437	128.673
3	13	(Northern Ireland) Lee Johnston	BMW	01:10:30.677	128.422
4	2	(England) James Hillier	Kawasaki	01:10:30.947	128.414
5	17	(England) Peter Hickman	BMW	01:10:50.444	127.825
6	16	(Australia) David Johnson	BMW	01:11:00.805	127.514
7	8	(England) Guy Martin	BMW	01:11:10.217	127.233
8	1	(England) John McGuinness	Honda	01:11:35.129	126.495
9	5	(New Zealand) Bruce Anstey	Honda	01:11:47.731	126.125
10	10	(Isle of Man) Conor Cummins	Honda	01:11:50.172	126.053

=== TT Zero ===
Rank	Number	Rider	Machine	Time	Speed (mph)
1	1	(England) John McGuinness	Mugen	18:58.743	119.279
2	5	(New Zealand) Bruce Anstey	Mugen	19:02.785	118.857
3	3	(Northern Ireland) Lee Johnston	Brammo	20:16.881	111.620
4	6	(England) Guy Martin	Victory	20:37.987	109.717
5	7	(Scotland) Robert Wilson	Sarolea	21:15.256	106.510
6	10	(Republic of Ireland) Michael Sweeney	University of Nottingham	30:56.695	73.156

=== Supersport TT 2 ===
Rank	Number	Rider	Machine	Time	Speed (mph)
1	9	(England) Ian Hutchinson	Yamaha	01:11:58.750	125.803
2	5	(New Zealand) Bruce Anstey	Honda	01:12:13.570	125.373
3	8	(England) Guy Martin	Triumph	01:12:30.775	124.877
4	10	(England) James Hillier	Kawasaki	01:12:39.835	124.618
5	7	(England) Gary Johnson	Yamaha	01:12:53.400	124.231
6	13	(Northern Ireland) Lee Johnston	Triumph	01:13:07.207	123.840
7	4	(Isle of Man) Conor Cummins	Honda	01:13:27.145	123.280
8	1	(England) John McGuinness	Honda	01:13:27.187	123.279
9	15	(Isle of Man) Dan Kneen	Honda	01:13:29.162	123.223
10	16	(Australia) David Johnson	Triumph	01:13:31.628	123.155

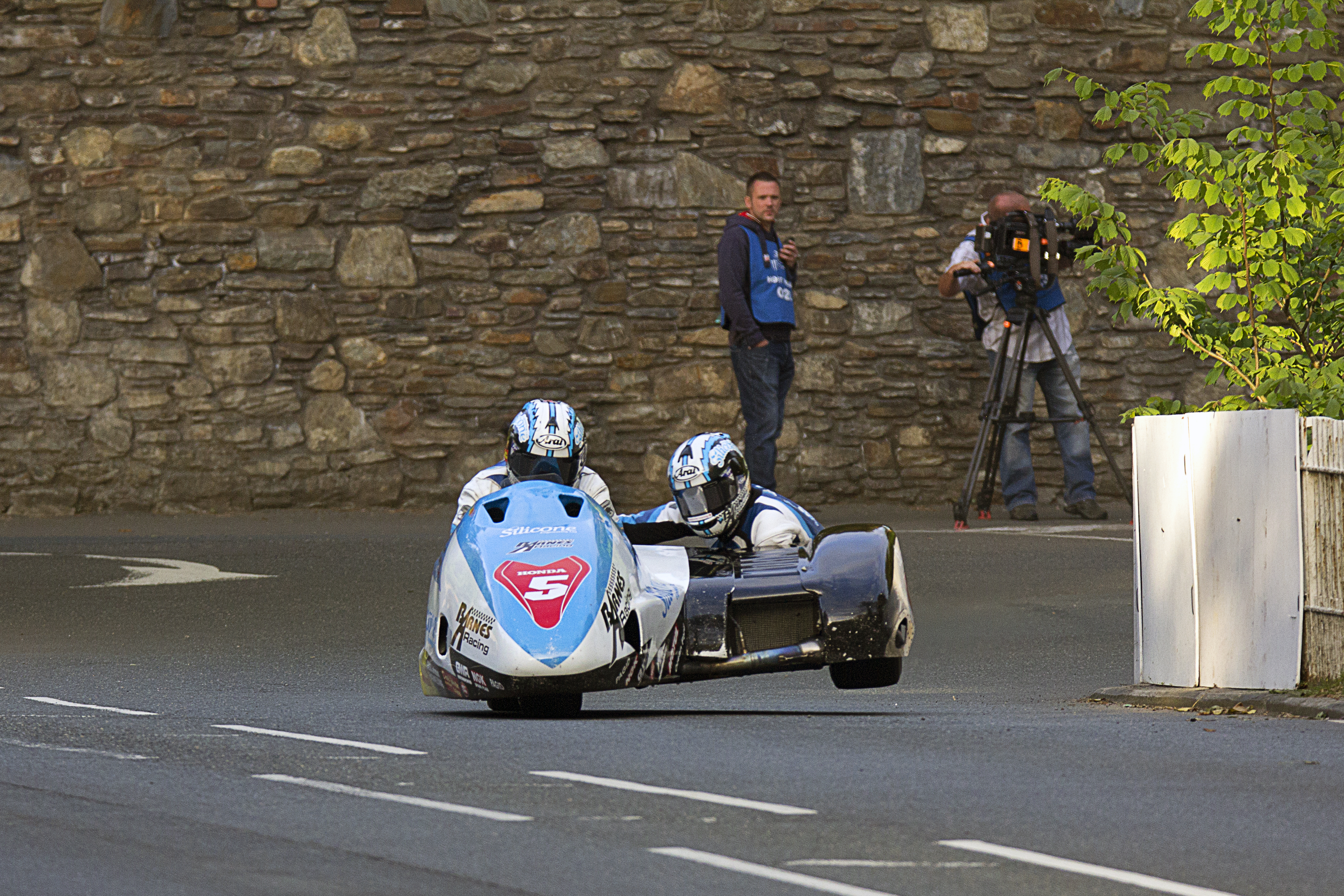
John Holden and Daniel Sayle (pictured in practice) took their second podium of the week in second sidecar race

=== Sidecar TT 2 ===
Rank	Number	Rider & Passenger	Machine	Time	Speed (mph)
1	3	(England) Ben Birchall & Tom Birchall	LCR	58:24.971	116.259
2	1	(Isle of Man) Dave Molyneux & Benjamin Binns	Suzuki DMR	58:32.555	116.008
3	5	(England) John Holden & (Isle of Man) Daniel Sayle	LCR Honda	58:44.836	115.604
4	2	(England) Conrad Harrison & Mike Aylott	Shelbourne Honda	01:00:00.881	113.162
5	8	Ian Bell & Carl Bell	LCR Yamaha	01:00:58.065	111.393
6	29	Matthew Dix & Shaun Parker	Baker Yamaha	01:01:51.854	109.779
7	9	Wayne Lockey & Mark Sayers	Ireson Honda	01:02:37.392	108.449
8	40	Stephen Ramsden & Matty Ramsden	LCR	01:02:52.696	108.009
9	14	Robert Handcock & Aki Aalto	Baker Honda	01:03:03.752	107.693
10	19	Tony Baker & Fiona Baker-Milligan	Suzuki	01:03:14.313	107.393

=== Lightweight TT ===
Rank	Number	Rider	Machine	Time	Speed (mph)
1	6	(England) Ivan Lintin	Kawasaki	57:06.070	118.936
2	2	(England) James Hillier	Kawasaki	57:09.945	118.802
3	4	(England) Michael Rutter	Paton	57:43.318	117.657
4	8	(England) James Cowton	Kawasaki	58:05.032	116.924
5	7	(Northern Ireland) Jamie Hamilton	Kawasaki	58:15.457	116.575
6	10	(England) Daniel Cooper	Kawasaki	58:19.594	116.438
7	12	(England) Michael Russell	Kawasaki	59:05.750	114.922
8	33	(United States) Mark Miller	Kawasaki	59:53.262	113.402
9	9	(England) Connor Behan	Kawasaki	59:56.166	113.311
10	17	(England) Danny Webb	Kawasaki	59:58.353	113.242

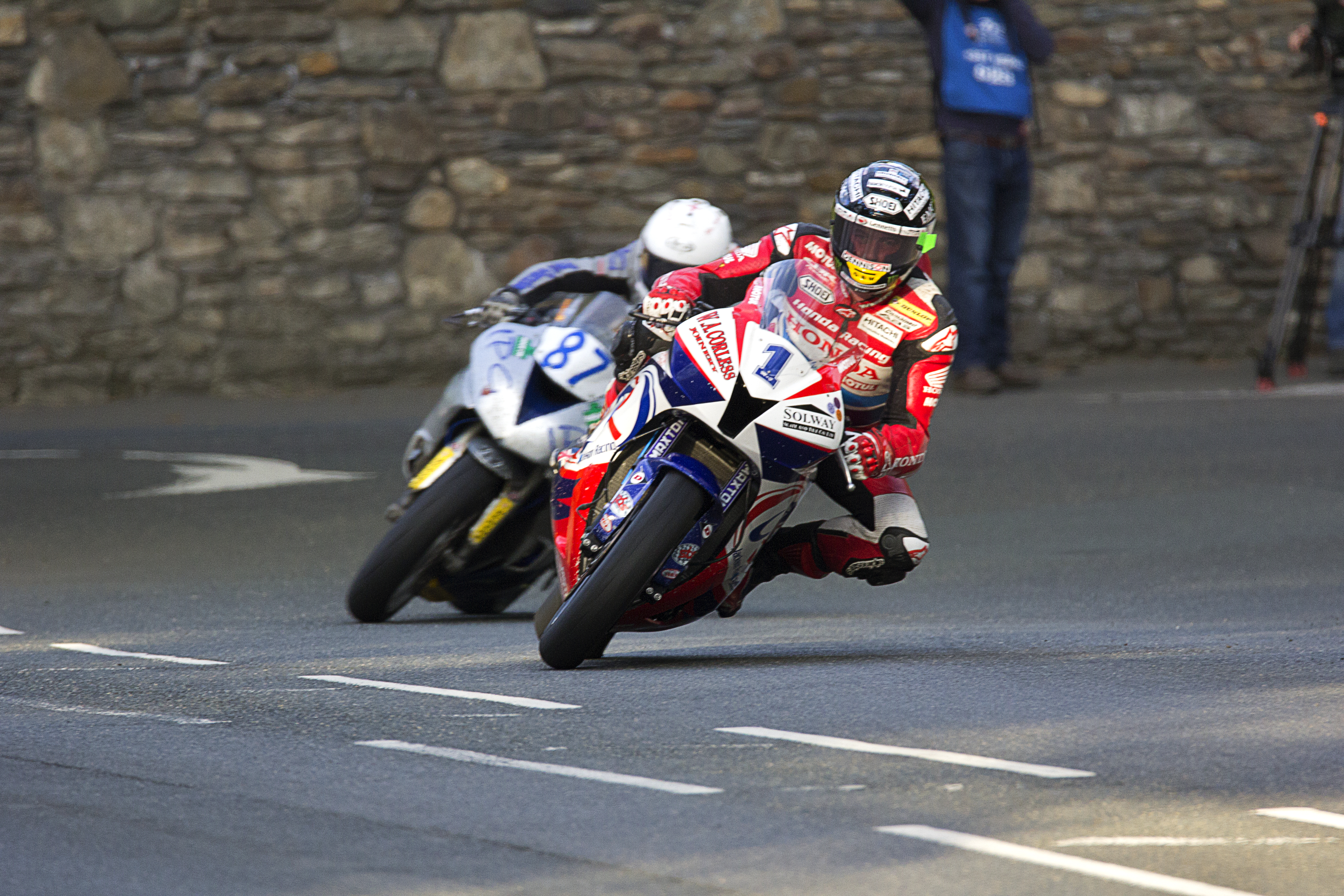
Senior TT winner John McGuinness (pictured in practice)

=== Senior TT ===
Rank	Number	Rider	Machine	Time	Speed (mph)
1	1	(England) John McGuinness	Honda	01:09:23.903	130.481
2	2	(England) James Hillier	Kawasaki	01:09:38.117	130.038
3	9	(England) Ian Hutchinson	Kawasaki	01:09:44.730	129.832
4	8	(England) Guy Martin	BMW	01:09:52.148	129.602
5	3	(Northern Ireland) Michael Dunlop	BMW	01:10:03.010	129.267
6	10	(Isle of Man) Conor Cummins	Honda	01:10:07.202	129.139
7	17	(England) Peter Hickman	BMW	01:10:09.836	129.058
8	5	(New Zealand) Bruce Anstey	Honda	01:10:13.264	128.953
9	16	(Australia) David Johnson	BMW	01:10:20.869	128.720
10	4	(England) Michael Rutter	BMW	01:10:23.255	128.648

== Bibliography ==
- "Island Racer 2015: Your Guide to the TT Races". Island Racer. Mortons Media Group. 2015. SKU: 2519401 – via Kelsey Publishing.
