= John McGuinness (motorcyclist) =

British motorcycle racer

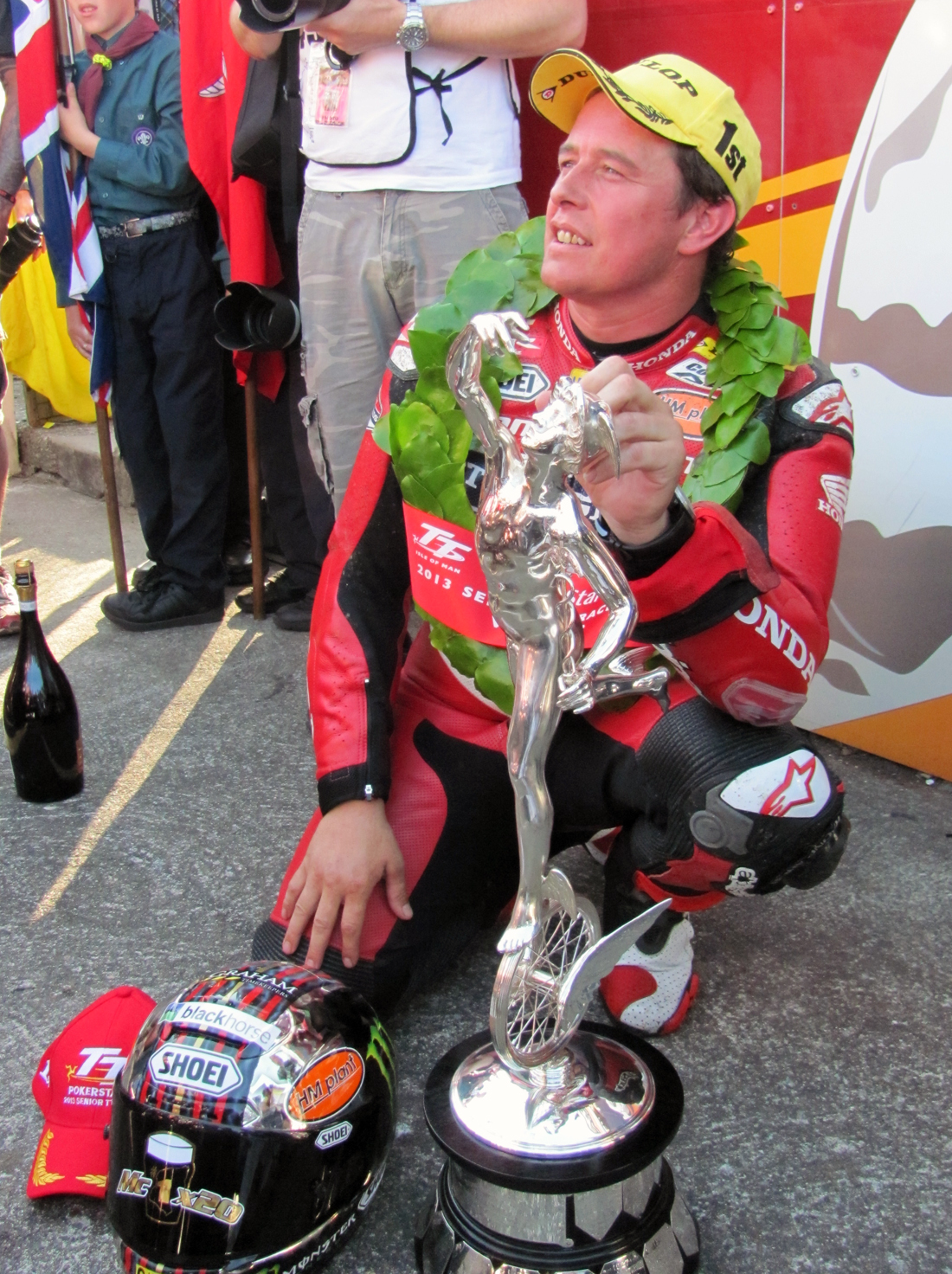
- McGuinness after winning the 2013 Senior TT
- Nationality: English
- Born: 16 April 1972 (age 54); Morecambe, Lancashire, England
- Current team: Honda Racing UK
- Bike number: 1
- Website: johnmcguinness.co.uk
Motorcycle racing career statistics
Isle of Man TT career
TTs contested	24 (1996–2000, 2002–2016, 2019, 2022–2024)
TT wins	23
First TT win	1999 Lightweight 250 TT
Last TT win	2015 Senior TT
TT podiums	47
- TT Course personal fastest lap 132.701 mph or 213.562 km/h

John Warren McGuinness MBE (16 April 1972) is an English motorcycle road racer, best known as a specialist at the Isle of Man TT, where he has won 23 races and sits third in the all-time win list behind Michael Dunlop and Joey Dunlop. He and Mike Hailwood hold the record for the most Senior TT wins with seven.

Until early 2017, McGuinness had a long association with Honda machines, having factory support in road races like the Isle of Man TT, the North West 200 and the Macau Grand Prix, and also on the short tracks in the British Superstock and Supersport series.

In May 2017, McGuinness suffered serious injuries during practice for a race in Northern Ireland, ending his race participation for the remainder of the season. The accident occurred shortly after the release of his book.

In January 2018, McGuinness announced his intended return as a TT rider, but had not sufficiently recovered to compete, and in April announced that a setback had prevented any competitive riding. He was able to complete a Parade lap of the TT circuit on a Norton SG4 during the June 2018 event, but returned in August to win the 2018 Classic TT on the 500 cc Paton.

In May/June 2019, McGuinness returned to the TT races, riding a large capacity Norton without success, but again renewed his association with smaller-capacity Hondas, finishing in places 15 and 17 in the two Supersport 600 races, second place in the TT Zero electric race, and another win in August's Classic TT, part of the Manx Grand Prix race weeks.

In 2013, a left-hand bend on the Snaefell Mountain Course used for the TT races before the top of Barregarrow on the main A3 road was named McGuinness's in recognition of his wins, together with Dave Molyneux who was similarly honoured.

McGuinness was part of a multi-rider motorcycle endurance-racing team called Honda TT Legends. In April 2016, the RAC announced McGuinness as recipient of the Segrave Trophy for 2015.

== Early life ==
McGuinness was born and raised in Morecambe, Lancashire. He started competing in motocross at around seven, and continued until his teens. He withdrew from what was supposed to be his first race a few seconds before the start, due to anxiety. His first experience of motorcycle road racing was in 1982, at the age of ten, with his father, who was competing in the Jurby races, in the Isle of Man.

His father owned a motorcycle repair shop but advised John to train as a bricklayer. Graduating in 1990, the resultant recession forced him into cockle fishing with his future father-in-law. McGuinness’ first race on tarmac was a club road race at Aintree in 1990, at the age of 18. He finished in last position.

== Isle of Man TT ==
McGuinness’ first Isle of Man TT race was in 1996 on a Honda RS250R, finishing 15th. He took his first win in the Lightweight 250cc race three years later, the year he also became British 250 Champion.

=== 2006 ===
TT 2006 proved to be the best ever for McGuinness. He won three races (Senior, Superbike and Supersport) and he lowered the outright lap record four times during the festival. This all started in the TT Superbike race on 3 June, recording 17:42.53 from a standing start, then 17:41.71 on the second lap. His record lap stood at 127.933 mph to take in the 37.73 miles of the Mountain course, before another record-breaking performance in the Senior TT race on 9 June. McGuinness set a time of 17:39.95 from a standing start (already 1.76 seconds faster than a racing lap) and then blitzed the course in 17:29.26, 10.69 seconds faster than his opening lap and at an average speed of 129.451 mph.

=== 2007 ===
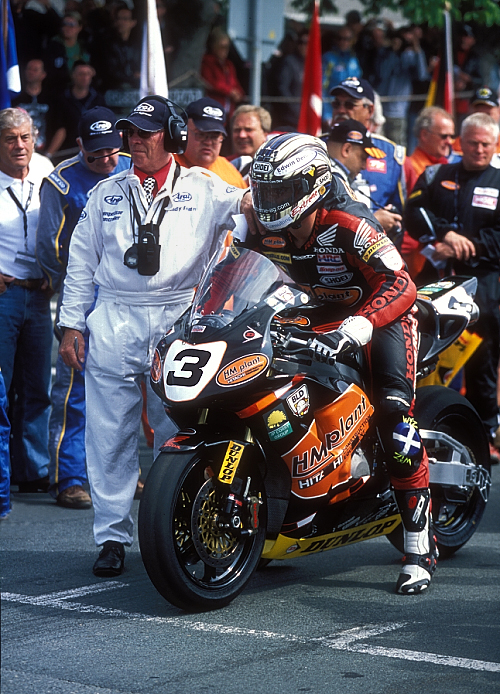
McGuinness at the start of the 2007 Senior TT; the race in which he became the first rider to lap the Snaefell Mountain Course at over 130 miles per hour in race conditions.

TT 2007 was also a great year with McGuinness taking wins in the Superbike TT and the Senior TT with lap and race records in both, the Senior lap record of 17:21.99 averaging 130.354 mph. This did not beat the outright lap record, but it was the first to break the 130 mph barrier.

=== 2008 ===
The 2008 Isle of Man TT saw McGuinness struggle with reliability problems with his bikes, but did manage to pick up his 14th career win on the island, in the Senior TT. This win moved him alongside Mike Hailwood as the joint second-placed rider with most wins.

=== 2009 ===
McGuinness surpassed Hailwood's mark during the rain-delayed opening race of the 2009 Isle of Man TT on 8 June 2009. After Cameron Donald unofficially lapped the course at over 131 mph during practice, McGuinness broke the outright lap record by 0.7 seconds, taking the lap record to 17:21.29 or 130.442 mph. McGuinness held off team-mate Steve Plater by 18.11 seconds to record victory number fifteen. That was his only win and podium of the week; however, he did finish the week with a new outright lap record, and the fastest lap ever recorded with a 17:12.30 or 131.578 mph lap on the second lap of the Senior TT. A broken chain cost him a runaway victory, as Plater took his second career TT win.

McGuinness also finished on the podium at the Macau Grand Prix.

McGuinness also contested the British Superstock championship, taking victory at Croft after his team-mate Steve Brogan and champion Alastair Seeley tangled in the final corner. This was his first short-circuit race win since 2001 in the British Supersport series, which he finished in third place overall.

=== 2010 ===
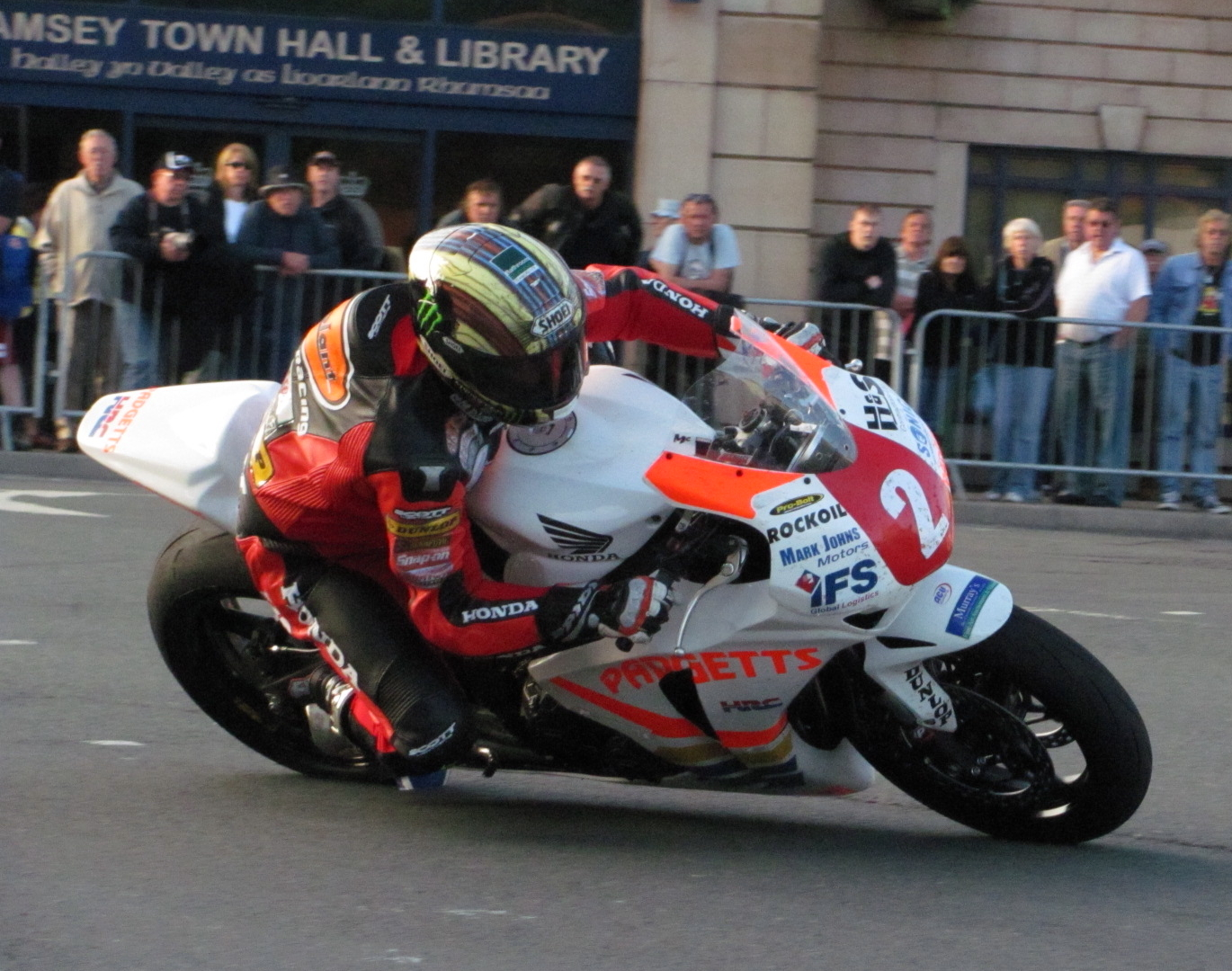
McGuinness during practice for the 2010 Isle of Man TT.

McGuinness was confirmed as part of the HM Plant Honda team for the North West 200 and Isle of Man TT events, also he is confirmed with Padgetts Motorcycles (Padgetts Grand Prix). Entered in the British superstock championship alongside new team mate's Glen Richards and Ian Hutchinson (road racing events).

At the 2010 North West 200 meeting, McGuinness took his fifth win around the 8.9-mile circuit when he took victory in the Superbike race and he followed this up with third in the feature race behind Alastair Seeley and Stuart Easton. He also took fifth and sixth in the two Supersport races and ninth in the Superstock.

=== 2011 ===
McGuinness secured his 16th TT success by winning the six-lap Superbike TT in perfect conditions. The Honda rider from England came home 56 seconds ahead of runner-up Cameron Donald, with Gary Johnson third. Keith Amor, Ballymoney's Michael Dunlop and Dan Stewart completed the top six leaderboard in the TT opener. New Zealander Bruce Anstey led for part of the race but retired on lap three after setting the fastest lap of the race at 131.05 mph. At the end of lap one, McGuinness led by 0.5 seconds from Anstey, with Johnson third and Guy Martin fourth. Anstey assumed the lead after the second circuit, thanks to his lap at over 131 mph, with Martin up to third and Johnson fourth. A quick pitstop by McGuinness saw him move into the lead again and then Anstey retired his Padgetts Honda at Quarry Bends. Morecambe-man McGuinness led Martin by 19 seconds after lap three and lap four.

McGuinness then went on to finish fifth in the Supersport TT Race 1 and scored second places in both the Supersport TT Race 2 and Superstock TT Race before claiming his 17th TT win in the Senior TT

=== 2012 ===
McGuinness was again representing the Honda spear-head at the 2012 TT. During the practice week, times were close between the various favoured entrants, but McGuinness topped the practice leader board in the Superbike class.

Initially lying second behind Cameron Donald by 2/10ths of a second at the end of the opening lap in the Superbike race, McGuinness brought all his experience to bear over the second lap to lead the race by 2.16 seconds following the pit stop at the end of lap two. By the end of the third lap, the lead had increased to 6.30 seconds. McGuinness continued his commanding performance throughout the remainder of the race, to clinch victory by 14.86 seconds by the end of the six laps.

McGuinness was congratulated on his Superbike triumph by his close friend, Mark Webber.

The Superstock TT had been until 2012, one of the few classes which had eluded McGuinness. However, aboard the Padgett's Honda Fireblade, McGuinness rode what was widely regarded as an imperious performance to clinch his initial win in the class, and to raise his overall tally to 19 wins.

McGuinness then recorded a respectable fourth place in the first Supersport race, which he then followed up with fifth place in the second race in the Supersport class.

=== 2013 ===
In 2013, McGuinness won the six-lap Senior TT, the final race of the event. It was his sixth victory in the Senior TT, one short of the record of seven victories held by Mike Hailwood. He also set the outright one lap record for the Mountain Course, 131.671 mph, in the final lap of the Superbike race in which he finished third during a week dominated by Ulsterman Michael Dunlop's four wins, reminiscent of Ian Hutchinson's five wins of 2010.

==== TT Zero ====
2012 also saw McGuinness make his debut in the TT Zero class. The involvement of McGuinness, together with that of Mugen was seen as a clear indication of the rising profile of a class of racing still in its infancy.

Riding the Mugen Motorsports experimental machine, McGuinness recorded a second place behind Michael Rutter on the MotoCzysz.

2013 again saw the same race result, with McGuinness second to winner Rutter, both riding similar machines to previously.

2014, a battered McGuinness who suffered a motocross accident weeks before the start of the Road Racing season, injuring his right wrist badly, and also suffered liver and other minor injuries. McGuinness struggled at his first international road racing meeting of the year the North West 200 and also posted disappointing results at the 2014 Isle of Man TT. On 4 June, McGuinness and Padgetts Racing announced he had withdrawn from the second Supersport race, but still raced the TT Zero class, and won it with an enormous lap record, 117.366 MP/H, beating the current Sidecar lap record, and came only 1.8 seconds shy to the current Lightweight 650cc Supertwin one lap record.

== 2017 accident ==
In May 2017, McGuinness suffered serious injuries during practice for the Superbike race at the North West 200 event in Northern Ireland, causing broken vertebrae, ribs and compound fractures to his right lower leg bones, requiring surgeons to remove 50 mm (2.0 in) and needing an external fixator cage to 'grow' new bone. McGuinness used a spanner to regularly adjust the cage, creating a 1 millimetre gap across which the new bone growth occurs.

In July 2017, Honda Racing, a British business based in Louth, Lincolnshire which provided the new model Honda Fireblade under early development, confirmed the accident was caused by an electronics fault in the special race-kit when the engine unexpectedly accelerated.

During an interview in late August 2017, McGuinness confirmed his treatment would be ongoing until early 2018, and that he was unsure if he would have the physical capability or confidence to race 1000 cc Superbikes again, but he did not discount the possibility of riding in the smaller Supertwin, electric and classic categories.

== 2018 return ==
In January 2018, McGuinness announced his intended-return as a TT rider with Norton Motorcycles as team-mate to Josh Brookes, but his recovery was not complete and in April announced via social media that he had suffered a setback that prevented any competitive riding. He was able to complete a Parade lap of the TT circuit on a Norton SG4 during the June 2018 event, but returned in August to win the 2018 Classic TT on the 500 cc Paton.

=== 2019 ===
In May/June 2019, McGuinness made a return to the TT races, riding Nortons in both Junior and large capacity races without success, but again renewed his association with Padgetts Hondas finishing in places 15 and 17 for the two Supersport 600 races, and second place in the TT Zero electric race with a Honda/Mugen. In August, he won the Classic TT on a Paton.

=== 2022 ===
After the cancellation of the 2020 and 2021 events due to the COVID-19 pandemic, McGuinness next competed at the TT in 2022. He made his 100th TT start in the Superbike race, finishing fifth.

== MotoGP ==
McGuinness entered four rounds of the MotoGP World Championship, one in 250 cc class and the other three in the 500 cc class, between 1997 and 2000 with a best result of 12th.

== Personal life ==
McGuinness and wife Becky have two children. They have been together since John was 16. Living in Morecambe, he was given the Freedom of the Town in 2007. His first book, an autobiography entitled Built for Speed, was released in May 2017.

In July 2017, McGuinness was awarded an Honorary Fellowship from Myerscough College in Preston for his achievements in motorcycling. He attended the ceremony despite still recuperating from his extensive injuries as a result of his major crash two months previously.

McGuinness was appointed Member of the Order of the British Empire (MBE) in the 2021 New Year Honours for services to motorcycle racing.

== Racing statistics ==
=== TT race victories ===
Year	Race & Capacity	Motorcycle	Average Speed
2015	Senior TT	Honda	130.48 mph
2015	TT Zero	Mugen	119.27 mph
2014	TT Zero	Mugen	117.36 mph
2013	Senior TT	Honda	128.94 mph
2012	Superstock TT	Honda	126.65 mph
2012	Superbike TT	Honda	128.07 mph
2011	Senior TT	Honda	128.42 mph
2011	Superbike TT	Honda	127.87 mph
2009	Superbike TT	Honda	127.99 mph
2008	Senior TT	Honda	127.18 mph
2007	Senior TT	Honda	127.25 mph
2007	Superbike TT	Honda	125.55 mph
2006	Senior TT	Honda	126.17 mph
2006	Supersport TT	Honda	122.26 mph
2006	Superbike TT	Honda	124.76 mph
2005	Senior TT	Yamaha	124.32 mph
2005	Superbike TT	Yamaha	124.12 mph
2004	Formula One TT	Yamaha	125.38 mph
2004	Lightweight 400cc TT	Honda	110.28 mph
2004	Junior 600cc TT	Yamaha	120.57 mph
2003	Lightweight 400cc TT	Honda	109.52 mph
2000	Singles TT	Chrysalis	109.63 mph
1999	Lightweight 250 TT	Honda	116.79 mph

=== TT career summary ===
Position	1st	2nd	3rd	4th	5th	6th	7th	8th	9th	10th	11th	12th	15th	17th	18th	24th	DNF
No of times	23	13	11	6	9	5	6	3	3	2	1	1	3	1	1	1	17

Last updated in June 2024

=== Grand Prix motorcycle racing ===
==== Races by year ====
(key) (Races in bold indicate pole position, races in italics indicate fastest lap)

Year	Class	Bike	1	2	3	4	5	6	7	8	9	10	11	12	13	14	15	16	17	Pos	Pts
1997	250cc	Aprilia	MAL	JPN	SPA	ITA	AUT	FRA	NED	IMO	GER	BRA	GBR; 14	CZE	CAT	INA	AUS			35th	2

=== British Superbike Championship ===
(key) (Races in bold indicate pole position; races in italics indicate fastest lap)

Year	Class	Bike	1		2		3		4		5		6		7		8		9		10		11		12		13		Pos	Pts
Year	Class	Bike	R1	R2	R1	R2	R1	R2	R1	R2	R1	R2	R1	R2	R1	R2	R1	R2	R1	R2	R1	R2	R1	R2	R1	R2	R1	R2	Pos	Pts
2004	BSB	Kawasaki	SIL	SIL	BHI	BHI	SNE	SNE	OUL	OUL	MON	MON	THR	THR	BHGP; 3	BHGP; 6	KNO; Ret	KNO; 7	MAL; 9	MAL; 9	CRO; 10	CRO; 7	CAD; 9	CAD; 9	OUL; 13	OUL; Ret	DON; Ret	DON; 11	14th	86

Year	Make	1			2			3			4			5			6			7			8			9			10			11			12			Pos	Pts
Year	Make	R1	R2	R3	R1	R2	R3	R1	R2	R3	R1	R2	R3	R1	R2	R3	R1	R2	R3	R1	R2	R3	R1	R2	R3	R1	R2	R3	R1	R2	R3	R1	R2	R3	R1	R2	R3	Pos	Pts
2009	Honda	BHI	BHI		OUL	OUL		DON	DON		THR	THR		SNE	SNE		KNO	KNO		MAL	MAL		BHGP	BHGP	BHGP	CAD; 12	CAD; Ret		CRO	CRO		SIL	SIL		OUL	OUL	OUL	33rd	4

== Bibliography ==
- Davison, Stephen; McGuinness, John (24 April 2015). John McGuinness: Isle of Man TT Legend. Blackstaff Press. ISBN 978-0856409370.
- McGuinness, John (4 May 2017). Built for Speed: Bikers, Beers and Balls of Steel. Ebury Press. ISBN 978-1785034800.

Sporting positions
Preceded by Michael Rutter	Macau Motorcycle Grand Prix; Winner; 2001	Succeeded by Michael Rutter
