= 2006 Isle of Man TT =

Annual motorcycle racing event

Isle of Man TT Mountain Course

The 99th anniversary Isle of Man TT Festival ran between Saturday 27 May and Friday 9 June on the 37.73-mile Mountain Course. The first week (between 27 May and 2 June) is known as the practice week, before the real action commenced on 3 June. There were 6 races in TT week. John McGuinness broke the lap record during practice for the Superbike race and then did it again in the race itself. He recorded a lap of 17:41.71, breaking the Superbike record from last year by 8.62 seconds and his outright lap record by 2.1 seconds.

McGuinness then went on to take his first TT hat-trick by winning the Senior TT on 9 June, destroying the lap record in the process. He set a lap of 17:39.95 from a standing start then 17:29.26 on his 2nd lap (breaking his own lap record by 10 seconds). However, the meeting was overshadowed by the death of Japanese rider Jun Maeda on 6 June due to injuries suffered in a practice crash.

== Results ==
- Race 1 – Jester Interactive TT Superbike Race 3 June (6 laps – 226.38 miles)

Rank	Rider	Team	Speed	Time
1	(England) John McGuinness	Honda	124.764 mph	1:48.52.06
2	(Wales) Ian Lougher	Honda	124.021 mph	1:49.31.20
3	(England) Ian Hutchinson	Kawasaki	123.58 mph	1:49.54.61
4	(Republic of Ireland) Martin Finnegan	Honda	122.385 mph	1:50.59.02
5	(Australia) Cameron Donald	Honda	122.881 mph	1:51.26.54
6	(Wales) Jason Griffiths	Yamaha	121.821 mph	1:51.59.67
7	(England) Carl Rennie	Kawasaki	121.217 mph	1:52.03.19
8	(Isle of Man) Paul Hunt	Yamaha	120.925 mph	1:52.19.41
9	(Northern Ireland) Davy Morgan	Honda	120.425 mph	1:52.45.90
10	(Republic of Ireland) Raymond Porter	Yamaha	120.427 mph	1:52.47.28

New Outright Lap Record: John McGuinness, 127.933 mph

- Race 2 – Scottish Life International TT Superstock Race 5 June (4 laps – 150.92 miles)

Rank	Rider	Team	Speed	Time
1	(New Zealand) Bruce Anstey	Suzuki	124.147 mph	1:12.56.34
2	(England) Ian Hutchinson	Kawasaki	123.912 mph	1:13.04.64
3	(Wales) Jason Griffiths	Yamaha	123.25 mph	1:13.28.19
4	(England) Guy Martin	Yamaha	122.946 mph	1:13.39.09
5	(England) John McGuinness	Honda	122.106 mph	1:14.09.48
6	(Wales) Ian Lougher	Honda	121.209 mph	1:14.42.43
7	(Republic of Ireland) Martin Finnegan	Honda	120.602 mph	1:15.04.30
8	(England) Mark Parrett	Yamaha	119.972 mph	1:15.28.65
9	(Isle of Man) Gary Carswell	Suzuki	119.923 mph	1:15.30.51
10	(England) Rob Frost	Honda	119.627 mph	1:15.41.70

- Race 3 – Hilton Hotel & Casino Sidecar TT, Race A 5 June (3 laps – 113.00 miles)

Rank	Rider	Team	Speed	Time
1	(Isle of Man) Nick Crowe / Darren Hope	Honda	113.342 mph	1:00:27.15
2	(England) Steve Norbury / Scott Parnell	Yamaha	110.902 mph	1:01:14.26
3	(England) John Holden / Andrew Winkle	Honda	109.635 mph	1:01:56.71
4	(England) Roy Hanks / David Wells	Yamaha	109.321 mph	1:02:07.38
5	(England) Gary Bryan / Colin Hardman	Yamaha	109.098 mph	1:02:15.02
6	(England) Andrew Laidlow / Patrick Farrance	LCR Suzuki	108.562 mph	1:02:33.45
7	(England) Philip Dongworth / Stuart Castles	Ireson Yamaha	108.321 mph	1:02:42.13
8	(England) Tony Elmer / Darren Marshall	Ireson Yamaha	107.584 mph	1:03:07.57
9	(Isle of Man) Glyn Jones / Chris Lake	DMR Honda	106.824 mph	1:03:34.50
10	(England) David Wallis / Sally Wilson	Honda	106.492 mph	1:03:46.40

- Race 4 – Isle of Man Steam Packet Supersport Junior TT 7 June (4 laps – 150.92 miles)

Rank	Rider	Team	Speed	Time
1	(England) John McGuinness	Honda	122.264 mph	1:14:03.73
2	(New Zealand) Bruce Anstey	Suzuki	121.542 mph	1:14:30.13
3	(Wales) Jason Griffiths	Yamaha	120.707 mph	1:15:01.08
4	(Wales) Ian Lougher	Honda	120.388 mph	1:15:13.00
5	(Australia) Cameron Donald	Honda	119.552 mph	1:15:44.56
6	(Republic of Ireland) Martin Finnegan	Honda	119.207 mph	1:15:57.70
7	(Isle of Man) Nigel Beattie	Yamaha	119.116 mph	1:16:01.19
8	(England) Dan Stewart	Yamaha	118.524 mph	1:16:23.97
9	(England) Mark Parrett	Yamaha	118.329 mph	1:16:31.53
10	(Isle of Man) Chris Palmer	Honda	117.952 mph	1:16:46.20

New Lap Record: John McGuinness, 123.975 mph

Note: Ian Hutchinson did finish 2nd in the Supersport race, but was later disqualified, as his Kawasaki ZX-6 was deemed to be illegal due to a 0.2mm (0.02 cm) difference in cam dimensions. However, McAdoo Racing (Hutchinson's team) have lodged an appeal to have the position re-instated.

- Race 5 – Hilton Hotel & Casino Sidecar TT, Race B 7 June (3 laps – 113.19 miles)

Rank	Rider	Team	Speed	Time
1	(Isle of Man) Nick Crowe / Darren Hope	DMR Honda	111.467 mph	1:00:55.64
2	(England) Steve Norbury / Scott Parnell	Yamaha	110.376 mph	1:01:31.78
3	(England) Roy Hanks / Dave Wells	DMR Honda	108.67 mph	1:02:29.73
4	(England) Bill Currie / Mark Cox	Windle Yamaha	107.312 mph	1:03:17.16
5	(England) Tony Baker / Mark Hegarty	Yamaha	107.181 mph	1:03:21.81
6	(England) Conrad Harrison / Kris Hibberd	Honda	106.426 mph	1:03:48.78
7	(England) Roger Stockton / Pete Alton	Yamaha	105.614 mph	1:04:18.23
8	(England) Kenny Howles / Doug Jewell	Suzuki	105.582 mph	1:04:19.39
9	(England) John Holden / Andrew Winkle	Honda	105.569 mph	1:04:19.85
10	(England) Nigel Connole / Jamie Winn	Honda	105.362 mph	1:04:27.46

- Race 6 – Jester Interactive Senior TT 9 June (6 laps – 226.38 miles)

Rank	Rider	Team	Speed	Time
1	(England) John McGuinness	Honda	126.178 mph	1:47:38.84
2	(Australia) Cameron Donald	Honda	125.68 mph	1:47:59.45
3	(New Zealand) Bruce Anstey	Suzuki	125.596 mph	1:48:08.79
4	(Wales) Ian Lougher	Honda	125.396 mph	1:48:19.11
5	(England) Guy Martin	Yamaha	123.841 mph	1:49:40.71
6	(England) Carl Rennie	Kawasaki	122.411 mph	1:50:57.62
7	(Northern Ireland) Davy Morgan	Honda	121.646 mph	1:51:39.48
8	(Republic of Ireland) Raymond Porter	Yamaha	121.439 mph	1:51:50.90
9	(Isle of Man) Nigel Beattie	Yamaha	121.137 mph	1:52:07.60
10	(Isle of Man) Gary Carswell	Suzuki	121.027 mph	1:52:13.76

New Outright Lap Record: John McGuinness, 129.451 mph

== Notes ==
- Major alterations to the Snaefell mountain course are carried out for the 2006 TT Races with road widening at the Windy Corner carried-out over the winter of 2005–2006.
- Ryan Farquhar misses the 2006 TT Races after breaking an arm after crashing a 250cc motor-cycle at the Cookstown Races. His place is taken by Adrian Archibald in the Suzuki team. However, Ryan Farquhar makes a return to the Mountain Course when he races in the 2006 Manx Grand Prix.
- Practice for the 2006 Isle of Man TT Races is the first complete all dry session since 1957.
- During Thursday afternoon practice, Dave Molyneux and Daniel Sayle crashed at Rhencullen after the sidecar outfit experiences a 145 mph backward flip. Molyneux suffered shoulder injuries and withdrew from the event.

== Bibliography ==
- "Island Racer 2006: The Ultimate Isle of Man TT Guide". Island Racer. Mortons Media Group. 2006 – via Kelsey Publishing.
