= Colin Hardman =

British motorcycle racer

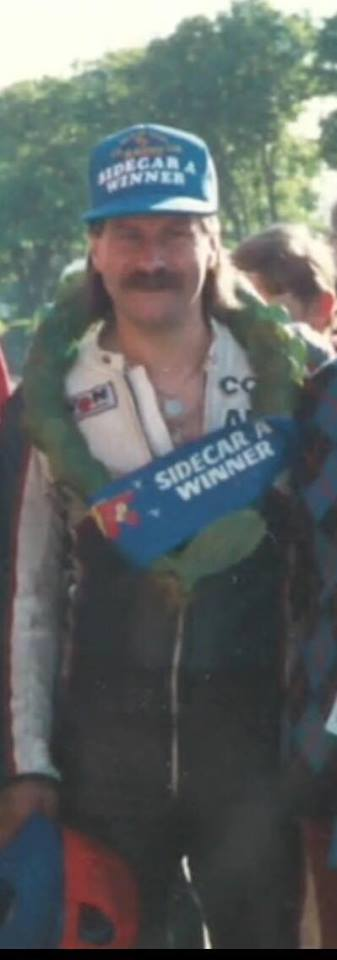
- Hardman wearing 1989 Sidecar TT Race 'A' winner's garland
- Nationality: British
- Born: 24 February 1947; St Helens, Lancashire
- Died: 8 July 2006 (aged 59) Oliver's Mount, Scarborough
Motorcycle racing career statistics
Isle of Man TT career
TTs contested	19 (1982 – 1989, 1993, 1995 – 2006)
TT wins	1
First TT win	1989 Sidecar TT Race 'A'
TT podiums	4
- Relatives: Alan Hardman (brother)

Colin Hardman (24 February 1947 – 8 July 2006) was a British motorcycle racer who competed in both the solo and sidecar classes.

== Biography ==
Nicknamed "Cocker", Hardman was born in St Helens, Lancashire and was the younger brother of the rugby league player, Alan Hardman.

=== Racing career ===
==== Solo Racing ====
===== 1974–1981 =====
Inspired by motorcycle racers such as Geoff Duke, Hardman began his solo racing career in 1966 on a Triumph at Croft, subsequently competing at the Aintree Motor Racing Circuit and Cadwell Park amongst others, before making his debut on the Isle of Man at the 1974 Manx Grand Prix where he competed in the Lightweight race, securing 52nd place on board a Ducati.

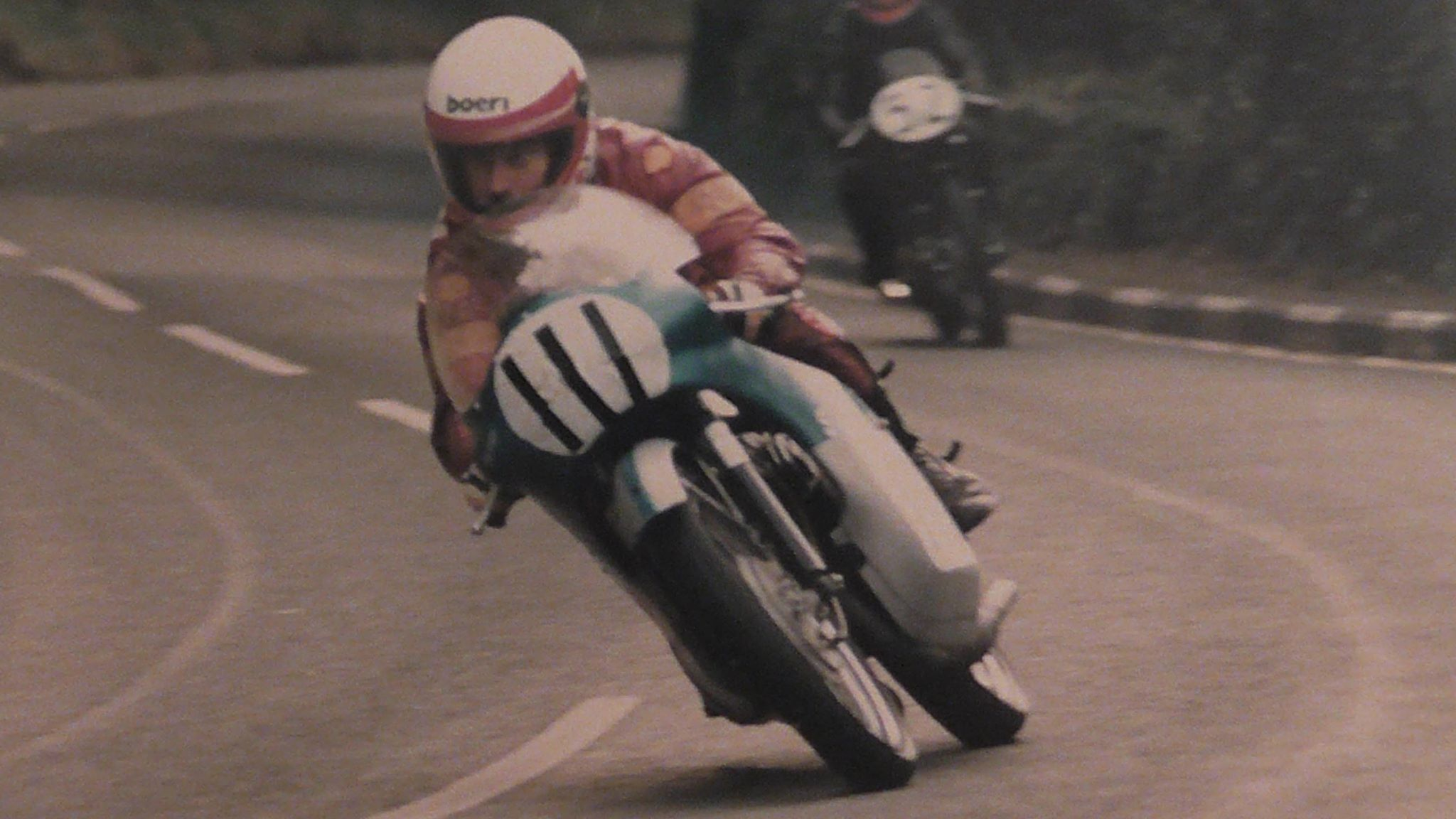
Hardman on a Suzuki at Braddan Bridge in the Classic Manx Grand Prix

Returning to the Isle of Man in 1975, Hardman again campaigned a Ducati in the Lightweight Manx Grand Prix, improving on his maiden appearance taking his machine home in 37th place. Hardman next competed at the 1979 Manx Grand Prix and continued his participation at the 1980 and 1981 meetings; however he posted retirements in all three races.

===== 1985–1993 =====
Although concentrating primarily on sidecar racing at this time, Hardman resumed competing on solo machinery at the 1985 Manx Grand Prix which saw him entered in the Junior race competing on a Yamaha. By the mid-1980s the Manx Motorcycle Club had introduced the format of classic racing to the Manx Grand Prix programme, and Hardman was able to compete in the class on a Suzuki, although in 1985 he failed to finish in both races he entered.

Fortunes were mixed at the 1986 meeting with Hardman being forced to retire whilst competing on a Rotax in the Lightweight class. However a relative upturn in fortune occurred in the Junior Classic in which he managed to finish in 20th place, although this was followed by further retirements at the 1987 and 1988 meetings.

From 1988, Hardman did not compete again on solo machinery until 1992. However, two further retirements accompanied his endeavors at the 1992 and 1993 races. After this, Hardman no longer competed in the solo classes.

=== Sidecar Racing ===
==== 1982–2006 ====
Hardman switched to sidecar racing in 1982 and made his first appearance in the Sidecar TT as passenger for Brian Hargreaves. A disappointing retirement for Hargreaves and Hardman in the opening race was followed by a 14th-place finish in their second outing (the event is raced over two legs with the overall winner performing the best in terms of aggregate).

Hardman teamed up with highly experienced driver Dennis Keen for the 1983 Isle of Man TT which saw them become an established partnership. Campaigning a Yamaha outfit, disappointment featured in the opening race which resulted in a retirement, however they subsequently claimed their first top-ten finish when seventh place was secured in the second sidecar race. At the 1984 TT a retirement again befell Keen and Hardman in the opening race, however the second race saw a credible sixth-place finish. Keen and Hardman took seventh place in the opening sidecar race at the 1985 Isle of Man TT, which also saw them take the outfit through the 100 miles per hour race average with an average race speed of 100.63 mph (161.95 km/h). Hardman partnered Keen for a fourth consecutive season in 1986, and again they saw mixed results at the Isle of Man TT posting a retirement in the opening race before taking eighth place in the second race of the meeting.

Following his time partnering Keen, Hardman took the chair for Michael Burcombe which saw them finish in 13th place at the 1987 Sidecar Race 'A' followed by a retirement in the Sidecar Race 'B'. A marked improvement in 1988 saw Burcombe and Hardman take their Ireson Yamaha home in seventh place in the sidecar 'A' race which in turn was followed up by fifth place in the 'B' race.

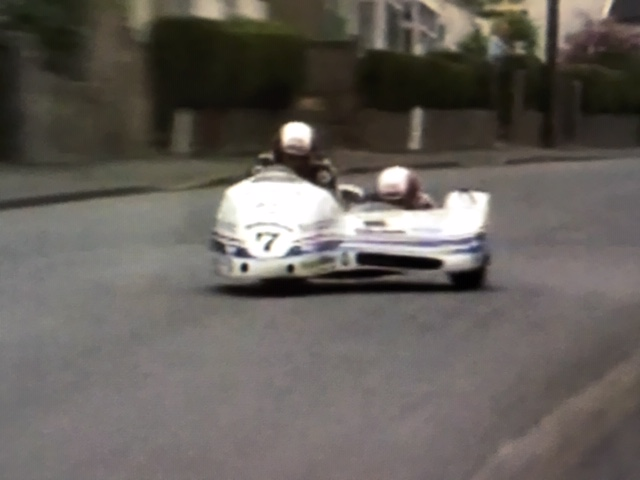
Dave Molyneux with Hardman in the sidecar descend Bray Hill on their way to third place in the 1989 Isle of Man TT sidecar 'B' race

By 1989, Hardman was recognised as one of the leading sidecar passengers in the race paddock and this led to his partnership with Dave Molyneux. For the 1989 Sidecar Race 'A', the duo took their place on the starting grid at the TT Grandstand alongside pre-race favourites Mick Boddice and Chas Birks and experienced crews such as Kenny Howles and Steve Pointer; Lars Schwartz and Leif Gustavsson; and Dave Saville and Richard Crossley. After the three punishing laps of the Snaefell Mountain Course, covering 113 miles (182 km) of racing, Molyneux and Hardman brought their 750cc Bregazzi Yamaha across the line in 1st place, claiming victory by the narrow margin of one second on corrected time from Howles & Pointer in a race time of 1hr 4mins 57seconds, recording an average speed of 104.56 mph (168.27 km/h). This was followed by 3rd place in the Sidecar 'B' race where Molyneux and Hardman upped their average race speed to 105.26 mph (169.40 km/h) allowing them to claim the Sidecar TT victory on aggregate over the two legs of the meeting.

The 1989 TT was the last time sidecars with an upper engine capacity of 1000 cc competed on the Snaefell Mountain Course. From 1990, formula racing was introduced to the Sidecar TT with engine capacity restricted to either 350 cc two stroke or 600 cc four stroke.

Following his success with Molyneux at the 1989 meeting, Hardman did not appear at the TT again until 1993 when he teamed up with Richard Crossley. Claiming a credible sixth place in their opening race, Crossley and Hardman then concluded the meeting when they took the third place on the rostrum in Sidecar Race 'B'. Hardman was again absent from the TT in 1994 before going on to accompany Alan Warner at the 1995 and 1996 meetings. This partnership produced a somewhat poor return for Hardman, 13th place being the highlight in the Sidecar 'B' race at the 1996 Isle of Man TT.

Hardman joined up with the former Swedish Sidecar Champion Lars Schwartz for the 1997 season with the pair continuing their partnership until 2000. Although they failed to make the grid for the Sidecar Race 'A' at the 1998 TT, a series of solid performances saw only one retirement in the seven occasions in which the duo competed at the TT with five top twenty finishes claimed.

The 2001 Isle of Man TT Races were cancelled as a consequence of the Foot and Mouth outbreak in the United Kingdom with racing resuming in 2002, and which saw the winning duo of Molyneux and Hardman reunited. Two strong performances saw them take fourth place in the opening race, and conclude the meeting by taking second place in the second of the two races. Hardman then teamed up with John Holden in 2003 where they enjoyed a brace of top ten finishes at the TT.

Missing the 2004 campaign, Hardman joined Gary Bryan in 2005. This partnership yielded a relatively low return at the 2005 TT where they were forced to retire in both races. The opening race of the 2006 TT saw Bryan and Hardman bring their outfit home in 5th position, however another retirement concluded their meeting.

== Death ==
Following the TT, Bryan and Hardman continued their season at the Oliver's Mount circuit in Yorkshire. During a practice session, their outfit crashed at the Esses section of the course, resulting in Hardman dying at the scene.

This was the first sidecar fatality at Oliver's Mount in 60 years of racing at the circuit.

As a result of the tragedy, the sidecar race at the meeting was cancelled, with the crews undertaking a parade lap in honour of the memory of Hardman.

Hardman's funeral took place at St German's Cathedral, Isle of Man following which there was a private cremation at Douglas Borough Crematorium. His ashes were scattered on the Cronk-y-Voddy Straight, said to have been his favourite section of the TT Course. There is a memorial headstone commemorating him in Kirk Michael Parish Churchyard.

== Private life ==
Hardman was twice married, with three children from his first marriage. Having lived for the early part of his life in St Helens, the family moved to the Isle of Man in 1977, where they made their home in Onchan.

== Racing Statistics ==
=== TT Race Victories ===
Year	Race & Capacity	Motorcycle	Average Speed
1989	TT Sidecar Race 'A'	Bregazzi TZ750 Yamaha	104.56 mph

== Career summary ==
=== Isle of Man TT ===
Finishing Position	1st	2nd	3rd	5th	6th	7th	8th	13th	14th	20th	DNF
Number of times	1	1	2	1	1	3	1	1	1	1	11

=== Manx Grand Prix ===
Finishing Position	20th	37th	52nd	DNF
Number of times	1	1	1	10

== Complete TT record ==
2006	Sidecar Race A 5	Sidecar Race B DNF
2005	Sidecar Race A DNF	Sidecar Race B DNF
2003	Sidecar Race A 8	Sidecar Race B 6
2002	Sidecar Race A 4	Sidecar Race B 2
2000	Sidecar Race A DNF	Sidecar Race B 18
1999	Sidecar Race A 17	Sidecar Race B 15
1998	Sidecar Race A DNS	Sidecar Race B 13
1997	Sidecar Race A 13	Sidecar Race B 22
1996	Sidecar Race A 17	Sidecar Race B 13
1995	Sidecar Race A DNF	Sidecar Race B 17
1993	Sidecar Race A 6	Sidecar Race B 3
1989	Sidecar Race A 1	Sidecar Race B 3
1988	Sidecar Race A 7	Sidecar Race B 5
1987	Sidecar Race A 13	Sidecar Race B DNF
1986	Sidecar Race A DNF	Sidecar Race B 8
1985	Sidecar Race A 7	Sidecar Race B DNF
1984	Sidecar 1st Leg; DNF	Sidecar 2nd Leg; 6
1983	Sidecar 1st Leg; 7	Sidecar 2nd Leg; DNF
1982	Sidecar 1st Leg; DNF	Sidecar 2nd Leg; 14

== Complete Manx Grand Prix record ==
1993	Classic Junior; DNF	
1992	Classic Junior; DNF	
1988	Lightweight; DNF	
1987	Lightweight; DNF	
1986	Classic Junior; 20	Lightweight; DNF
1985	Classic Junior; DNF	Junior; DNF
1981	Lightweight; DNF	
1980	Lightweight; DNF	
1979	Lightweight; DNF	
1975	Lightweight; 37	
1974	Lightweight; 52	

== See also ==
- Sidecar TT
- Sidecar World Championship

== Sources ==
- Dave Molyneux (2011). The Racer's Edge. Wharncliffe Publishing. pp. 38, 50, 60, 62, 65, 66. ISBN 978-1-84563-142-0.
- Mick Walker (2011). Sidecar Champions Since 1923. London: Breedon Books Publishing Company Limited. pp. 78, 80. ISBN 978-1-85983-810-5.
- Peter Kneale & Bill Snelling (1998). The History of the Manx Grand Prix (1923-1998). Laxey: Amulree Publications. pp. 158, 167. ISBN 1-901508-04-8.
