= Gary Carswell =

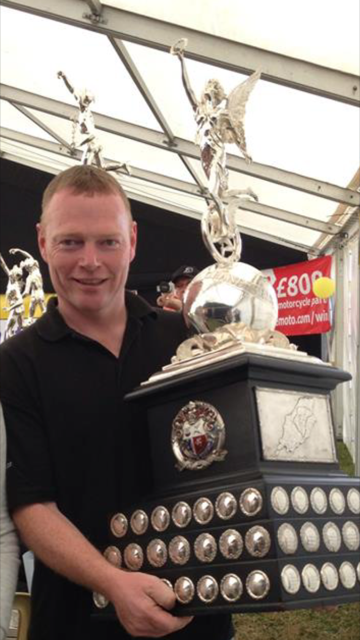
- Carswell with the Senior Manx Grand Prix trophy
- Nationality: Manx
- Born: 29 August 1968
- Died: 11 April 2015 (aged 46)
Motorcycle racing career statistics
Isle of Man TT career
TTs contested	56 (1996–2000, 2002–2014)
TT wins	0
TT podiums	1 (3rd place)

Gary Carswell (Gary Lee Stanley Carswell; 29 August 1968 – 11 April 2015) was a Manx solo-motorcycle road racer who worked as a civil engineer.

Carswell was a veteran competitor of the Isle of Man TT with 56 starts, and 12 starts in the Manx Grand Prix (long) road-races held on the 37-mile Snaefell mountain course around the island, also competing in the Southern 100 (short) road-races held on the 4-mile Billown Circuit, near Castletown in the south of the Isle of Man.

Carswell died in Noble's Hospital, Douglas, Isle of Man, on 11 April 2015, after crashing during a practice session at the Jurby Motodrome, Isle of Man, part of a two-day race weekend organised by the Andreas Racing Club.

== Racing history ==
Carswell entered the Manx Grand Prix, a race for amateur competitors, between 1991 and 1997. His best results were a win in the 1997 Senior class and two fifth-place finishes in the 1996 Senior and 1997 Junior classes.

Carswell entered TT races from 1996, with many finishes including a third place in the 2004 Senior TT. In 2007, he raced machines provided by Bolliger Kawasaki, a European World Endurance-racing outfit, gaining a 16th in the Superbike race and 13th in the Senior, in addition to ninth in Superstock and 21st in Supersport classes.

=== TT race summary ===
Finishing Position	3	8	9	10	11	12	13	14	15	16	18	20	21	23	25	26	28	29	31	34	40	42	50	DNF
Number of times	1	1	3	3	3	1	4	2	6	2	2	2	1	2	3	1	1	2	2	1	1	1	1	10

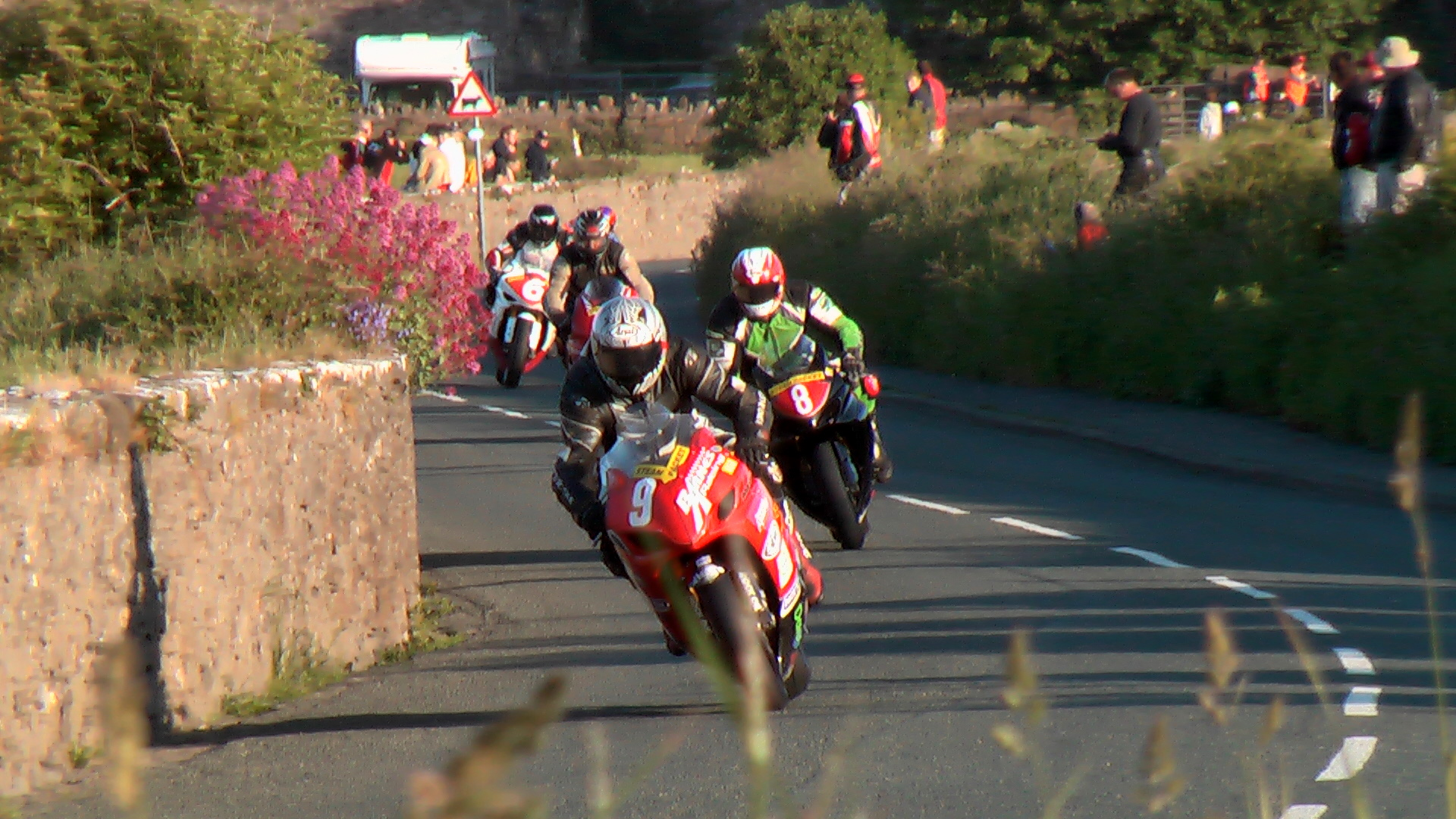
Carswell, second machine in the image with number plate #8, during the Southern 100 races in 2008, just outside of Ballabeg

=== Manx Grand Prix race summary ===
Finishing Position	1	5	16	21	36	37	46	DNF
Number of times	1	2	1	1	1	1	1	4

=== TT race position details ===
Year	Race	Position	Motorcycle	Average Speed
2014	Senior TT	25	Honda CBR1000RR Fireblade	119.151 mph
2014	Superbike TT	29	Honda CBR1000RR	118.972 mph
2014	Superstock TT	31	Honda CBR1000RR	118.505 mph
2013	Senior TT	31	Honda CBR1000RR	118.588 mph
2013	Superbike TT	33	Honda CBR1000RR	116.745 mph
2013	Superstock TT	29	Honda CBR1000RR	118.647 mph
2012	Superbike TT	DNF	-	-
2012	Superstock TT	50	Suzuki GSX-R1000	112.435 mph
2012	Supersport 600 Race 1	40	Honda CBR600	112.092 mph
2012	Supersport 600 Race 2	42	Honda CBR600	112.308 mph
2011	Senior TT	25	Honda CBR1000RR	118.129 mph
2011	Superbike TT	23	Honda CBR1000RR	117.659 mph
2011	Superstock TT	26	Honda CBR1000RR	119.606 mph
2011	Supersport 600 Race 1	34	Kawasaki ZZR600	114.307 mph
2011	Supersport 600 Race 2	23	Kawasaki ZZR600	114.643 mph
2009	Superbike TT	DNF	Suzuki GSX-R1000	-
2008	Senior TT	13	Suzuki GSX-R1000	120.946 mph
2008	Superbike TT	15	Suzuki GSX-R1000	119.896 mph
2008	Superstock TT	15	Suzuki GSX-R1000	120.388 mph
2007	Senior TT	13	Kawasaki ZX-10R	120.481 mph
2007	Superbike TT	16	Kawasaki ZX-10R	118.586 mph
2007	Superstock TT	9	Suzuki GSX-R1000	120.953 mph
2007	Supersport TT	21	Honda CBR600	116.579 mph
2006	Senior TT	10	Suzuki GSX-R1000	121.027 mph
2006	Superbike TT	14	Suzuki GSX-R1000	119.624 mph
2006	Superstock TT	9	Suzuki GSX-R1000	119.923 mph
2006	Supersport TT	16	Yamaha R6	116.968 mph
2005	Senior TT	DNF	Yamaha R1	-
2005	Superbike TT	14	Yamaha R1	117.714 mph
2005	Superstock TT	9	Yamaha R1	119.731 mph
2005	Supersport Junior TT 'A' race	13	Yamaha R6	115.999 mph
2005	Supersport Junior TT 'B' race	9	Yamaha R6	117.402 mph
2004	Senior TT	3	Suzuki GSX-R1000	120.64 mph
2004	Formula 1 TT	11	Suzuki GSX-R1000	118.7 mph
2004	Production 1000 TT	8	Yamaha R1	119.22 mph
2004	Junior 600 TT	15	Suzuki GSX-R600	114.4 mph
2004	Production 600 TT	28	Suzuki GSX-R600	111.68 mph
2003	Senior TT	10	Suzuki GSX-R1000	118.98 mph
2003	Formula 1 TT	10	Suzuki GSX-R1000	116.12 mph
2003	Junior 600 TT	15	Yamaha R1	114.23 mph
2003	Production 600 TT	20	Yamaha R1	112.22 mph
2002	Senior TT	11	Suzuki GSX-R1000	117.82 mph
2002	Formula 1 TT	DNF	Ducati 996	-
2002	Production 1000 TT	15	Suzuki GSX-R1000	116.17 mph
2002	Junior 600/250 TT	DNF	Honda CBR600	-
2002	Lightweight 400 TT	DNF	Yamaha 400	-
2000	Senior TT	DNF	Yamaha R1	-
2000	Formula 1 TT	DNF	Yamaha R1	-
2000	Junior 600 TT	DNF	Kawasaki 600	-
1999	Senior TT	13	Yamaha R1	115.85 mph
1999	Formula 1 TT	15	Yamaha R1	114.91 mph
1999	Production 1000 TT	18	Honda Fireblade	113.54 mph
1999	Junior 600 TT	20	Honda	111.57 mph
1998	Senior TT	18	Kawasaki ZX-7RR	112.87 mph
1998	Formula 1 TT	DNF	Kawasaki	-
1997	Production TT	14	Honda Fireblade	112.51 mph
1996	Production TT	25	Honda Fireblade	109.01 mph

== Personal life ==
Carswell was a family man who lived in the Ramsey area and worked as an engineer for Manx Utilities, a business providing power, water and gas services within the Isle of Man.
