= Dave Molyneux =

Manx chassis engineer

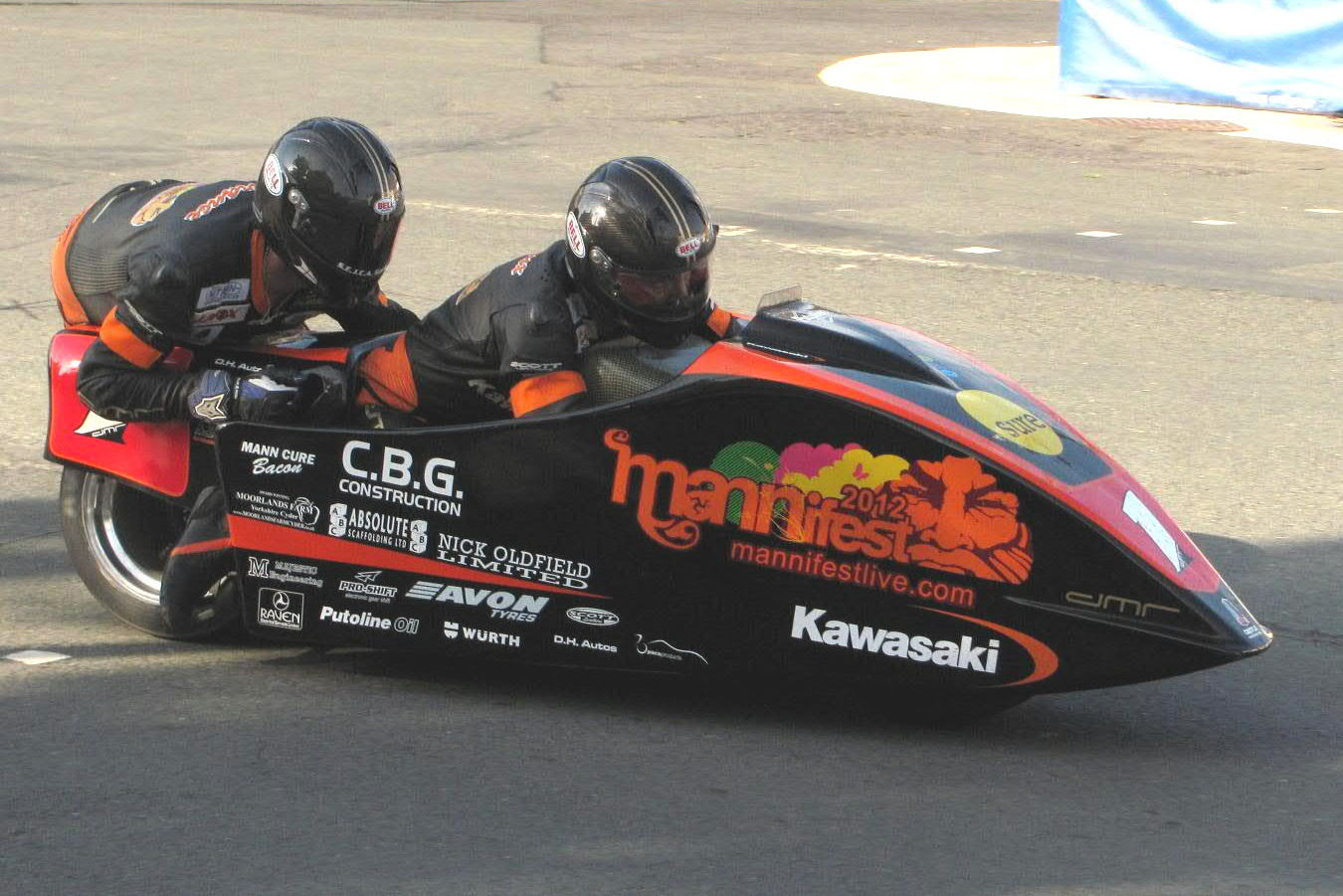
- Molyneux and passenger Patrick Farrance at Parliament Square during 2012 TT races
- Born: 21 November 1963 (age 62); Douglas, Isle of Man
- Other names: Moly, Moody Moly
- Nationality: Manx
Motorcycle racing career statistics
Isle of Man TT career
TTs contested	27 (1985 – 2000, 2002 – 2010, 2012 – present)
TT wins	17
First TT win	1989 Sidecar TT A race
Last TT win	2014 Sidecar TT B race
TT podiums	31

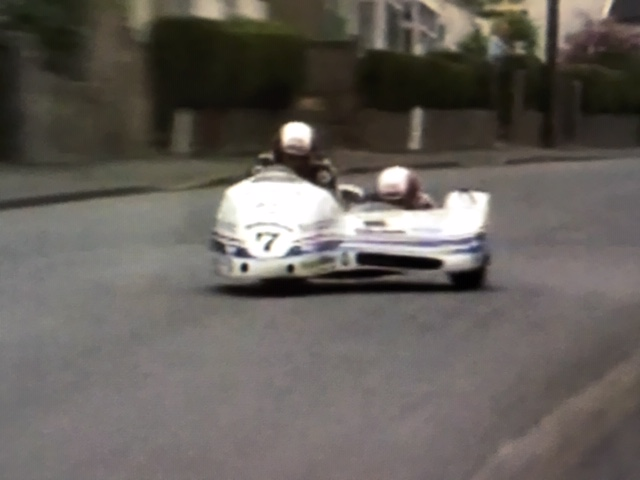
Dave Molyneux through Bray Hill in 1989

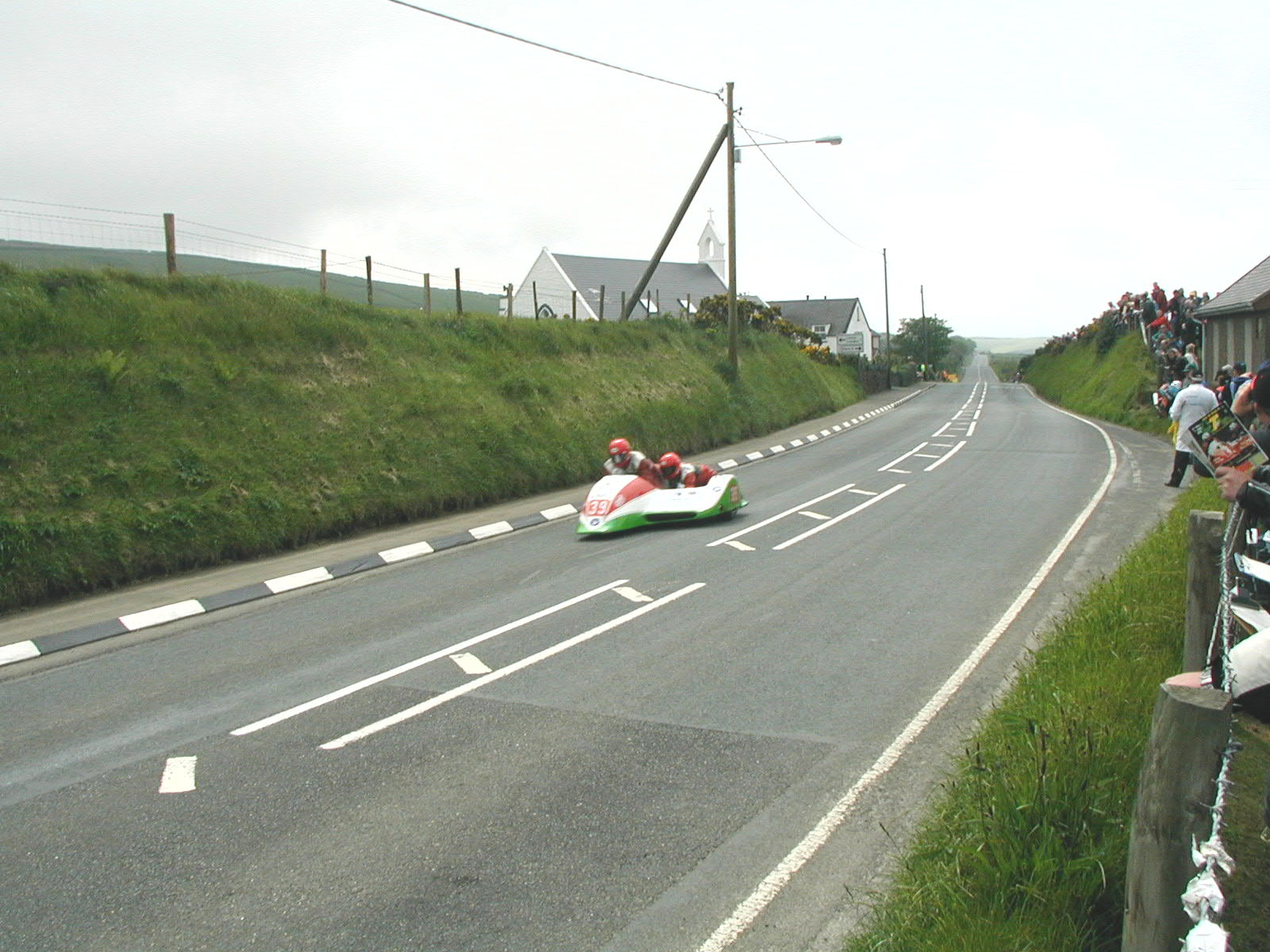
Sidecar crew Walters & Masterman in 2002 aboard a Trevor Ireson chassis at the right-hander named as Molyneux's from 2013, with the Cronk-y-Voddy Straight visible stretching into the distance

Dave Molyneux (born 21 November 1963 in Douglas, Isle of Man) is a Manx sidecar racer and chassis engineer. He is the most successful Sidecar competitor in the history of the Isle of Man TT races, achieving 17 TT victories and 30 podium finishes. His race wins place him fourth on the all-time wins list, behind solo bike racers Michael Dunlop (36 wins), Joey Dunlop (26 wins) and John McGuinness (23).

Moly, as he is often known, was the sidecar lap record holder for the Snaefell mountain course set in 2015 with a time of 19 minutes 23.056 seconds, an average race speed of 116.785 mph for one lap.

In 2013, a right-hand bend on the Snaefell Mountain Course used for TT and Manx Grand Prix races at the end of Cronk-y-Voddy Straight on the main A3 road was named Molyneux's in recognition of his wins, together with John McGuinness who was similarly honoured.

== Raceology ==
Beginning his TT career at the 1985 races, Molyneux failed to record a finish until his fifth outing in the first race at the 1987 'A' race where he placed tenth, but failed to finish in his sixth event, the 'B' race (the event is raced over two legs with the overall winner performing the best in terms of aggregate). Improvement continued 1988 with a sixth-place finish in the first leg of the Sidecar TT before retirement in the second race.

The 1989 meeting saw Molyneux begin to dominate the event with his maiden TT victory. Campaigning a Bregazzi Yamaha and partnered by experienced passenger Colin Hardman, the team took first place in the 'A' and third in the 'B' race. This resulted in Molyneux and Hardman claiming overall victory for the 1989 Sidecar TT.

Molyneux and Craig Hallam crashed during Thursday afternoon practice session for the 2006 races at Rhencullen after the sidecar outfit experienced a 140 mph Donald Campbell "bluebird-style flip." The outfit was destroyed in the resulting fire and Molyneux was unable to compete in the actual races due to injury. He made a comeback the following year taking a double victory, bringing his tally of wins to 13 at that time.

Molyneux's 14th victory came in 2009, when he also became the first winner of a TT sidecar race on a Suzuki powered machine. The lone race of 2009 saw him set a new race record on his Suzuki, (see above).

Molyneux did not compete at the TT in 2011 (although he rode the ex-Biland / O'Dell Seymaz Yamaha in the classic parade, with former TT passenger Karl Ellison), but he returned to the TT in 2012 on a Kawasaki powered machine winning both races. The first 2012 Sidecar race also made Molyneux the first ever competitor to win TTs using all four of the major Japanese manufacturers engines (Yamaha, Honda, Suzuki & Kawasaki).

2014 saw Molyneux take his 17th TT win in the second sidecar race. He led the first race by more than 20 seconds until an engine misfire caused him to stop on the final lap.

Molyneux is also a builder of road racing sidecars under the name DMR, Dave Molyneux Racing, and has supplied sidecars to many other TT winners including ten-time winner Rob Fisher, 2006 double winner Nick Crowe and six-time FIM World Champion Tim Reeves.

== Filmography ==
In 2017, Molyneux received top billing for his role in the film 3 Wheeling, an observational documentary filmed during TT period of 2016. The film premiered on 7 May 2017, followed by a limited theatrical release of 150 commercial screenings in cinemas in Northern Ireland, Germany, and the Isle of Man. Molyneux has not watched the film because he considers his racing efforts during the filming period to be "an absolute disaster", but praised the filmmakers for their hard work and ambitious promotion of Sidecar racing.

In 1994, Molyneux choreographed and performed the motorcycle stuntwork for Matthew Barney's film Cremaster 4, the first film in the acclaimed Cremaster series.

== Racing statistics ==
=== TT Race Victories ===
Year	Race & Capacity	Motorcycle	Average Speed
1989	TT Sidecar Race 'A'	Bregazzi TZ750 Yamaha	104.56 mph
1993	TT Sidecar Race 'A'	600cc Yamaha	103.33 mph
1993	TT Sidecar Race 'B'	600cc Yamaha	103.16 mph
1996	TT Sidecar Race 'A'	DMR	109.81 mph
1996	TT Sidecar Race 'B'	DMR	110.28 mph
1998	TT Sidecar Race 'B'	600cc DMR Honda	106.52 mph
1999	TT Sidecar Race 'B'	600cc DMR Honda	111.90 mph
2003	TT Sidecar Race 'B'	600cc DMR Honda	105.42 mph
2004	TT Sidecar Race 'A'	600cc DMR Honda	111.33 mph
2004	TT Sidecar Race 'B'	600cc DMR Honda	111.2 mph
2005	TT Sidecar Race 'B'	600cc DMR Honda	114.901 mph
2007	TT Sidecar Race 'A'	600cc DMR Honda	111.668 mph
2007	TT Sidecar Race 'B'	600cc DMR Honda	113.851 mph
2009	TT Sidecar Race 'A'	600cc DMR Suzuki	115.132 mph
2012	TT Sidecar Race 'A'	600cc DMR Kawasaki	113.055 mph
2012	TT Sidecar Race 'B'	600cc DMR Kawasaki	113.071 mph
2014	TT Sidecar Race 'B'	600cc DMR Kawasaki	113.756 mph

=== TT career summary ===
Finishing Position	1st	2nd	3rd	4th	6th	10th	DNF
Number of times	17	8	6	3	2	1	22

== Bibliography ==
- Molyneux, Dave; Richardson, Matthew (4 May 2011). The Racer's Edge: Memories of an Isle of Man TT Legend. Wharncliffe Books. ISBN 978-1-84563-142-0.
