= Bruce Anstey =

New Zealand motorcycle racer (born 1969)

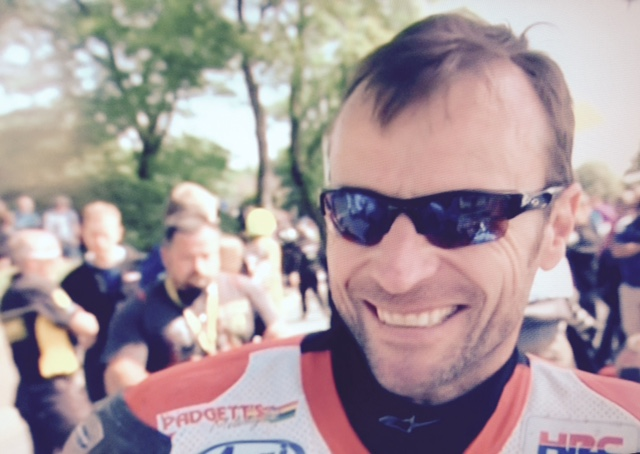
- Anstey at the 2014 Isle of Man TT
- Nationality: New Zealander
- Born: 24 April 1969 (age 57); Wellington, New Zealand
Motorcycle racing career statistics
Isle of Man TT career
TTs contested	20 (1996. 1998 –2000. 2002–2017)
TT wins	12
First TT win	2002 250cc TT
Last TT win	Classic Lightweight 250cc TT (Classic TT races in August 2019)
TT podiums	37

Bruce Anstey MNZM (born 21 August 1969 in New Zealand) is a professional motorcycle road racer. He is a former lap record holder on the Snaefell Mountain Course with a time of 17 minutes 6.682 seconds, at an average speed of 132.298 mph (212.913 km/h) set during the 2014 Superbike TT Race. Anstey was signed to race for the Padgett's Honda Racing Team having previously ridden for TAS Suzuki Racing, Valmoto Triumph and DTR Yamaha. For thirteen consecutive seasons, from 2002 - 2015, Bruce Anstey secured a top three finish at the North West 200, the Isle of Man TT and the Ulster Grand Prix.

On 10 April 2018, Anstey stated that due to illness he would not compete during the 2018 racing season. He did however ride a parade lap on board a Honda RC213V-S during the 2018 Isle of Man Festival of Motorcycling in late August. Anstey announced a return to competitive racing in July 2019 stating he would compete at the Classic TT, and secured a victory in the 250 cc event.

In a BBC Sport interview in September 2021, Anstey stated his intention to resume racing at the 2022 Classic TT.

== Racing career ==
Anstey was inspired to take up a career as a motorcycle racer after watching Mike Hailwood's comeback victory at the 1978 Isle of Man TT Races. He made his competitive debut on Boxing Day, 1990, at the Cemetery Circuit, Whanganui in his native New Zealand, competing on a Suzuki RGV250.

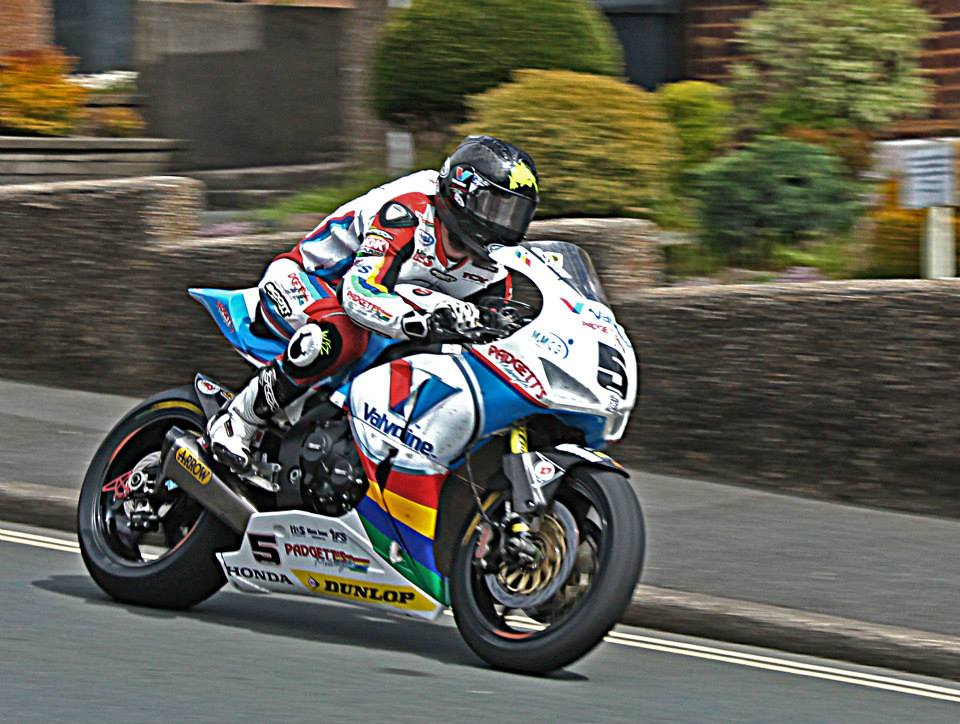
Anstey negotiates Bray Hill on his way to victory in the 2015 Superbike TT

== Isle of Man TT ==
=== 1996 ===
Anstey made his Isle of Man TT debut at the 1996 event. Riding a Yamaha he finished in 29th place in the Lightweight TT before retiring in the Senior TT.

==== 1996 TT results ====
Race	Position	Time	Speed	Replica
Lightweight 250cc	29th	1.27.4.05	103.99	Bronze
Senior TT	DNF			

=== 1998 ===
Due to illness, Anstey did not participate at the 1997 TT, with his next appearance being at the 1998 races. Again featuring in the Lightweight and Senior races, Anstey took his Yamaha TZ250 to a 26th-place finish in the Lightweight and followed this by taking 20th in the Senior TT, being the third 250cc mounted rider to finish behind Gavin Lee and his fellow New Zealander, Shaun Harris.

==== 1998 TT results ====
Race	Position	Time	Speed	Replica
Lightweight 250cc	26th	55.05.09	82.17	Bronze
Senior TT	20th	2.00.44.9	112.48	Bronze

=== 1999 ===
Campaigning in the same classes as the previous year and riding the same Yamaha TZ250, Anstey's form continued to improve in 1999, with him securing his first top-ten finish by claiming seventh in the Lightweight and following this up with 24th in the Senior.

==== 1999 TT results ====
Race	Position	Time	Speed	Replica
Lightweight 250cc	7th	1.19.21.5	114.1	Silver
Senior TT	24th	1.59.53.5	113.29	Bronze

=== 2000 ===
The 2000 Isle of Man TT saw Anstey gain his first podium place at the event, finishing second behind Joey Dunlop in the Lightweight TT. The second race of his week saw him again riding the DTR Yamaha TZ250 in the Senior where he took the Denis Trollope machine to the highest place of any 250cc machine in the race, 14th.

==== 2000 TT results ====
Race	Position	Time	Speed	Replica
Lightweight 250cc	2nd	59.39.4	113.84	Silver
Senior TT	14th	1.58.41.5	114.43	Silver

=== 2002 ===
The 2001 Isle of Man TT was cancelled as a precaution against the Foot and Mouth Outbreak reaching the Island. Racing resumed in 2002, with Anstey being entered in five races. He retired in the week's curtain raiser, the Formula 1 TT, however his fortunes improved as race week progressed. In the Ultra-Lightweight TT, Anstey took his DTR 125cc Yamaha to tenth place and then followed this with third place in the Production 1000cc class. He then secured his maiden victory at the TT taking the honours in the Lightweight TT on a DTR 250cc Yamaha. Anstey then recorded a second-place finish in his final race of the week, the Production 600cc.

==== 2002 TT results ====
Race	Position	Time	Speed	Replica
Formula 1 TT	DNF			
Ultra-lightweight 125cc	10th	1.30.32.9	100	Silver
Production 1000cc	3rd	56.05.2	121.08	Silver
Lightweight 250cc	1st	1.18.31.1	115.32	Silver
Production 600cc	2nd	57.36.9	117.87	Silver

=== 2003 ===
At the 2003 meeting, Anstey competed in four categories. Opening his account with the runner up position in the Production 1000cc race, he followed this up with a victory in the Junior TT aboard the Valmoto Triumph Daytona, giving Triumph its first TT win in 27 years. In the Production 600cc class, Anstey managed an eighth-place finish for Triumph and completed the racing programme with seventh place in the Senior aboard a 1000cc Suzuki.

==== 2003 TT results ====
Race	Position	Time	Speed	Replica
Production 1000cc	2nd	55.55.42	121.44	Silver
Junior 600cc	1st	1.15.13.98	120.36	Silver
Production 600cc	8th	38.50.74	116.55	Silver
Senior	7th	1.14.25.8	121.66	Silver

=== 2004 ===
Signed by TAS Suzuki in 2004, Anstey finish on the podium in all the races he entered at the TT. A third place in the opening Formula 1 was followed by victory in the 1000cc Production race. A trio of second-place finishes then followed as Anstey took the runner up spot in the Junior 600cc, the Production 600cc and the Senior TT respectively.

==== 2004 TT results ====
Race	Position	Time	Speed	Replica
Formula 1 TT	3rd	1.12.58.0	124.1	Silver
Production 1000cc	1st	54.53.5	123.72	Silver
Junior 600cc	2nd	1.15.23.0	120.12	Silver
Production 600cc	2nd	57.48.9	117.46	Silver
Senior	2nd	1.13.38.3	122.96	Silver

=== 2005 ===
Anstey once again was entered in five races at the 2005 Isle of Man TT, producing mixed results. Problems with his TAS Suzuki GSX-R1000 Superbike saw him retire in both races in which the machine featured. On the plus side Anstey took victory in the Superstock TT. Following this he took 4th place in the opening Supersport race but retired in the following one. Anstey's week ended with his retirement in Friday's Senior.

==== 2005 TT results ====
Race	Position	Time	Speed	Replica
Superbike	DNF			
Superstock	1st	54.39.74	124.242	Silver
Supersport Race 1	4th	1.15.56.10	119.249	Silver
Supersport Race 2	DNF			
Senior	DNF			

=== 2006 ===
In the 2006 TT practices, Anstey achieved the unofficial current top speed record for the Mountain Course of 206 mph (332 km/h) at the end of Sulby straight on a Suzuki 1000cc machine. This speed value was registered by the on-board datalogging equipment and so is not an official record.

==== 2006 TT results ====
Race	Position	Time	Speed	Replica
Superbike	DNF			
Superstock	1st	1:12.56.34	124.147 mph	Silver
Supersport Race 1	2nd	1:14:30.13	121.542 mph	Silver
Senior	3rd	1:48:08.79	125.596 mph	Silver

=== 2007 ===
At the Centenary TT of 2007, Anstey failed to finish in the opening Superbike Race, but claimed victory in the Superstock event winning by 40 seconds over John McGuinness. Anstey missed out on a podium place in the Supersport race finishing fourth, which was followed by another retirement in the highlight Senior TT.

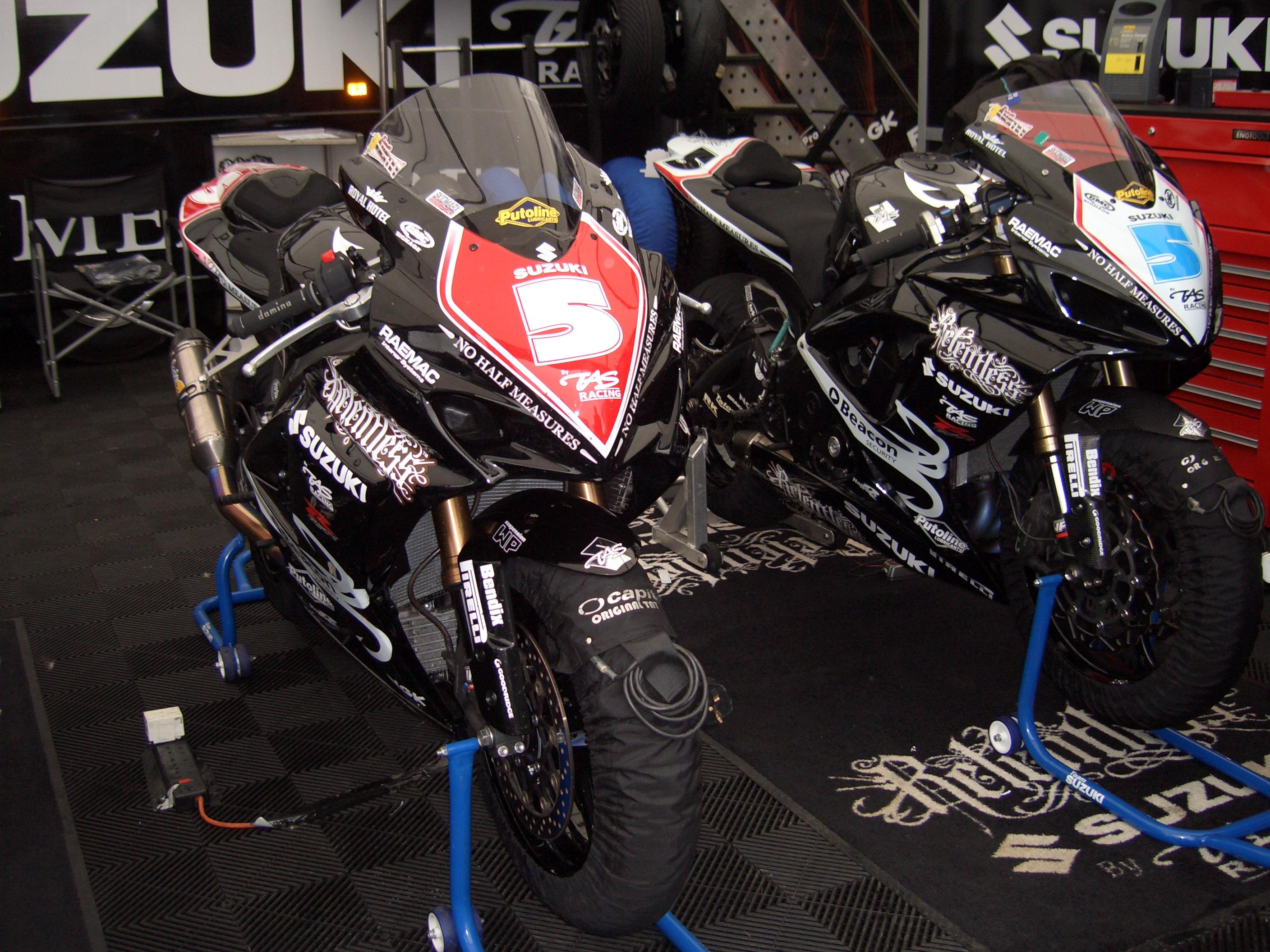
Two of Anstey's race bikes displaying his No 5 plate

==== 2007 TT results ====
Race	Position	Time	Speed	Replica
Superbike	DNF			
Superstock	1st	1:11.56.29	125.875 mph	Silver
Supersport Race	4th	1:13.38.27	122.969 mph	Silver
Senior	DNF			

=== 2008 ===
In 2008, Anstey opened his account by claiming the runner up spot in the Superbike race. This was followed by an initial victory in the opening Supersport only for Anstey to be subsequently stripped of the 1st place. Having defied a heavy cold to win the race, he was disqualified following an inspection of his machine, which found the exhaust cam did not meet regulations. However just two days later on Wednesday 4 June, Anstey won the second Supersport Junior race in which he was involved in a dice on corrected time with Ian Hutchinson. Following over 150 miles of racing, Anstey came home in a time of 1'13:35.71 at an average speed of 123.041 mph. On his second lap he also broke the lap record for the race with an average speed of 125.359 mph. The Senior TT again proved a disappointment for Anstey, with him posting a retirement.

To celebrate his Supersport Junior TT win, Suzuki released a GSXR-600 K8 replica of Anstey's Relentless by TAS Suzuki race bike.

==== 2008 TT results ====
Race	Position	Time	Speed	Replica
Superbike	2nd	1:48.16.66	126.614 mph	Silver
Supersport Race 1	DSQ			
Superstock	DNF			
Supersport Race 2	1st	1:13.35.71	123.041 mph	Silver
Senior	DNF			

=== 2009 ===
In Anstey's campaign at the 2009 Isle of Man TT, he was second in the second Supersport, but retired in the other four races.

==== 2009 TT results ====
Race	Position	Time	Speed	Replica
Superbike	DNF			
Supersport Race 1	DNF			
Superstock	DNF			
Supersport Race 2	2nd	1:15.05.81	120.580 mph	Silver
Senior	DNF			

=== 2010 ===
In the 2010 meeting, Anstey finished just outside the top-ten in the opening Superbike race. He failed to finish in either the opening Supersport or the Superstock races. An eighth place followed in the second Supersport race and, comparatively, the meeting ended on a positive note with Anstey securing the final place on the rostrum after a hard-fought Senior.

==== 2010 TT results ====
Race	Position	Time	Speed	Replica
Superbike	11th	1:50.07.67	123.337 mph	Silver
Supersport Race 1	DNF			
Superstock	DNF			
Supersport Race 2	8th	1:14.12.16	122.031 mph	
Senior	3rd	1:11.38.08	126.408 mph	Silver

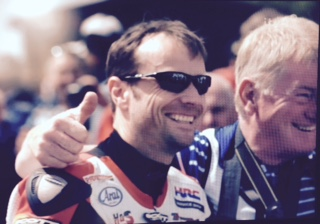
Anstey pictured at the TT Grandstand

=== 2011 ===
Anstey switched teams for the 2011 season. Although he failed to finish in the Superbike TT, he enjoyed a win in the opening Supersport race, followed by a further retirement in the Superstock. A fifth place in the second Supersport was followed by Anstey again taking third in the finale race, the Senior TT.

==== 2011 TT results ====
Race	Position	Time	Speed	Replica
Superbike	DNF			
Supersport Race 1	1st	54' 40.01	124.232 mph	Silver
Superstock	DNF			
Supersport Race 2	5th	1:13.43.85	122.814 mph	Silver
Senior	3rd	1:46.01.50	128.109 mph	Silver

=== 2012 ===
At the 2012 Isle of Man TT, Anstey took third place in the Superbike race, which was followed by victory in the opening Supersport race. A brace of fourth places followed in the Superstock and second Supersport races.

==== 2012 TT results ====
Race	Position	Time	Speed	Replica
Superbike	3rd	1:47.00.22	126.938 mph	Silver
Supersport Race 1	1st	1:12.55.92	124.160 mph	Silver
Superstock	4th	1:12.05.98	126.593 mph	Silver
Supersport Race 2	4th	1:13.50.38	122.633 mph	Silver
Senior	DNS [Race Cancelled]			

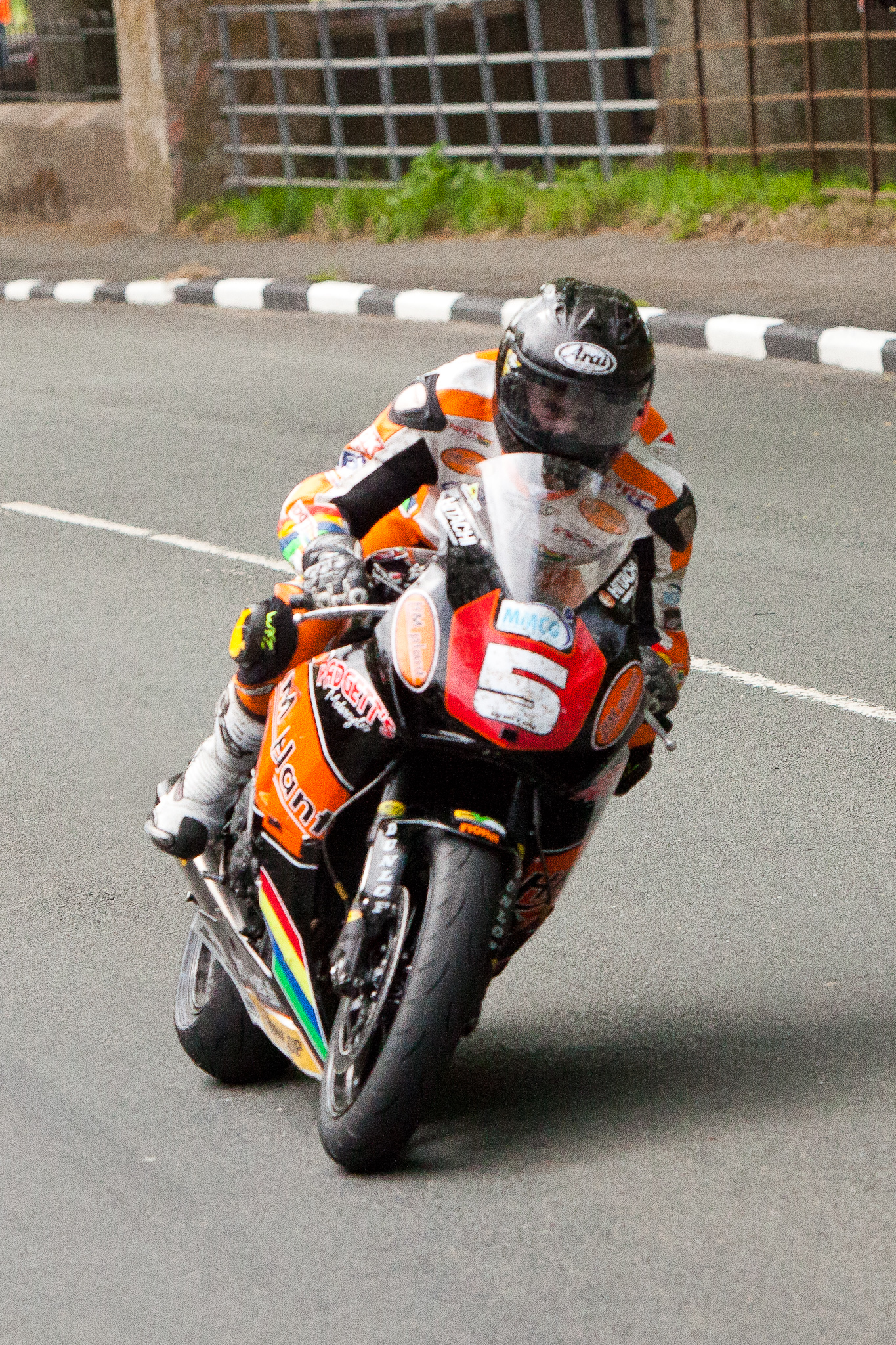
Anstey approaches Ramsey on his Superstock Honda Fireblade at the 2013 Isle of Man TT

=== 2013 ===
At the 2013 races, Anstey secured an eighth place in the opening Superbike race, followed by taking second place on the podium in the first Supersport. A fifth place in the Superstock was followed by another second in the second Supersport race. Anstey rounded off the week's racing with third place in the Senior.

==== 2013 TT results ====
Race	Position	Time	Speed	Replica
Superbike	8th	1:48.03.974	125.690 mph	Silver
Supersport Race 1	2nd	1:12.30.520	124.884 mph	Silver
Superstock	5th	1:11.56.895	125.857 mph	Silver
Supersport Race 2	2nd	1:11.54.404	125.930 mph	Silver
Senior	3rd	1:45.37.999	128.584 mph	Silver

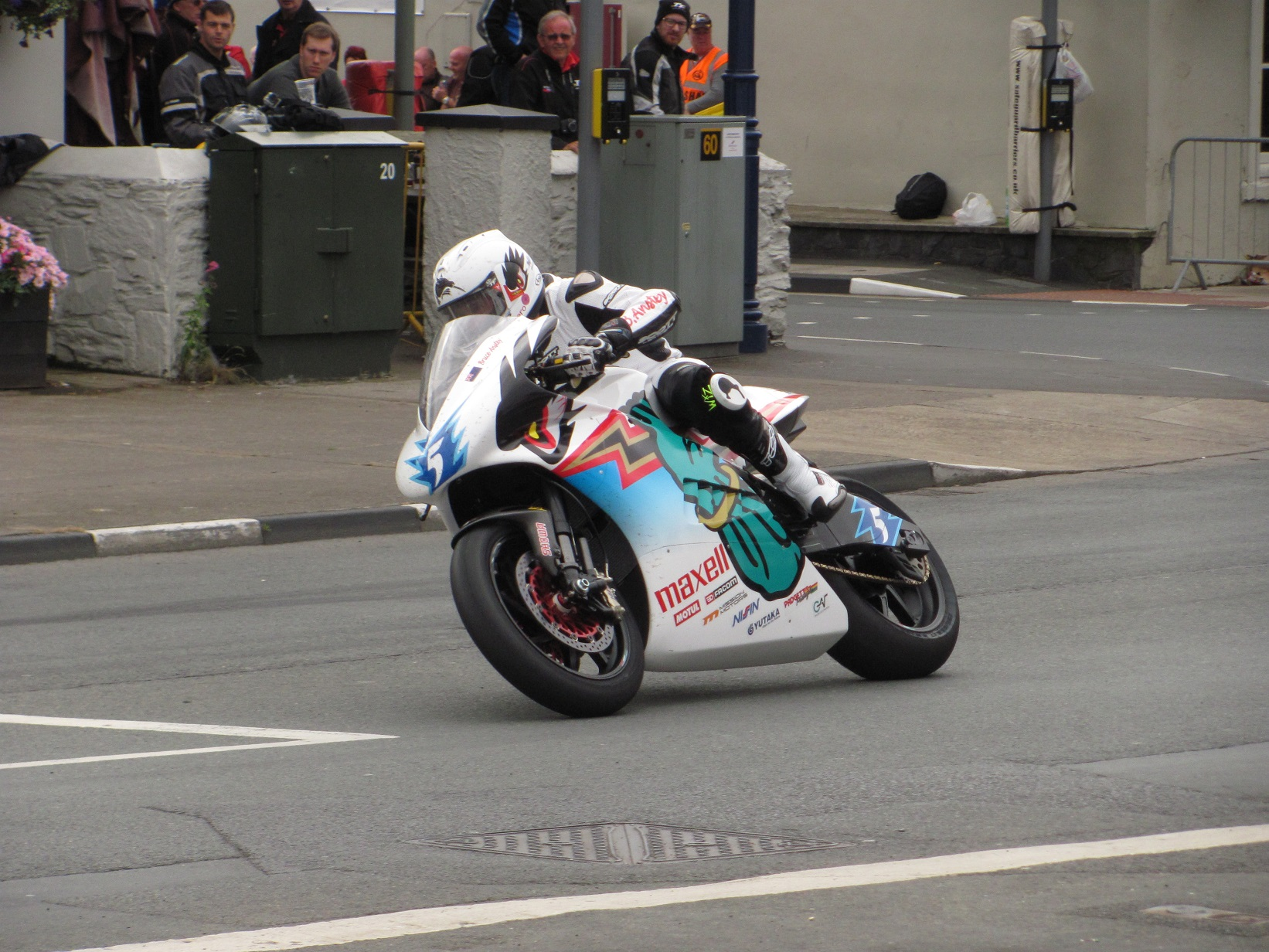
Anstey on board the Team Mugen Shinden San at Parliament Square, Ramsey

=== 2014 ===
Anstey posted a fourth place in the Superbike race, followed by second in the Supersport and third in the Superstock. The 2014 TT also saw Anstey's debut in the TT Zero Class in which he finished in second place to John McGuinness on an identical Mugen Shinden San. Another second place followed in the second of the Supersport events and the week was rounded off with fourth in the Senior.

In the Superbike TT, Anstey set a new outright lap record for the Mountain Course. In addition to his six silver replicas, Anstey was also awarded the John Williams Trophy for the fastest lap in the Superbike TT Race and the Jimmy Simpson Trophy, which is presented to the rider who has achieved the fastest lap of the meeting.

==== 2014 TT results ====
Race	Position	Time	Speed	Replica
Superbike	4th	1:46.31.687	127.504 mph	Silver
Supersport Race 1	2nd	1:12.44.483	124.483 mph	Silver
Superstock	3rd	1:11.54.197	125.936 mph	Silver
TT Zero	2nd	0:19.40.625	115.048 mph	Silver
Supersport Race 2	2nd	1:12.33.883	124.788 mph	Silver
Senior	4th	1:46.20.814	127.722 mph	Silver

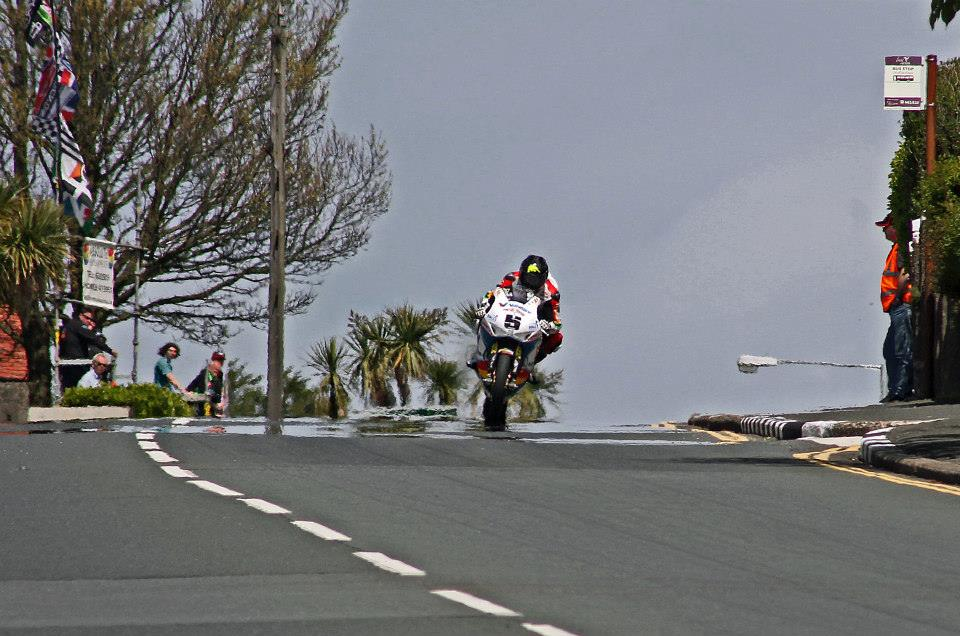
Anstey on Bray Hill during 2015

=== 2015 ===
==== Superbike TT ====
On Sunday 7 June 2015, Anstey achieved the highlight of his career, winning the Superbike TT. Lying in second place behind race leader Ian Hutchinson Anstey took the race lead following the pit stops at the end of lap four. Astride a Padgett's Honda Anstey began to extend his lead, claiming victory by 10.97 seconds on corrected time following 226.38 miles (364.32 km) of racing. Added to the victory, Anstey also set a new race record and the fastest lap of the race on his sixth lap at an average speed of 131.977 mph.

- Following his success in the Superbike race, Anstey also claimed the John Williams Trophy for the second year in succession.

==== Supersport (Race 1) ====
Anstey's 2015 campaign continued when he took a second place behind Hutchinson in the first of the Supersport races and followed this by finishing ninth in the Superstock.

==== TT Zero ====
Riding for the Mugen Shinden team, Anstey then competed in the TT Zero, his second year competing in the class, taking his electrically powered machine to second place behind Mugen teammate, John McGuinness.

==== Supersport (Race 2) ====
In the second Supersport race of the week, Anstey continued his run of podium positions, again finishing second to Ian Hutchinson.

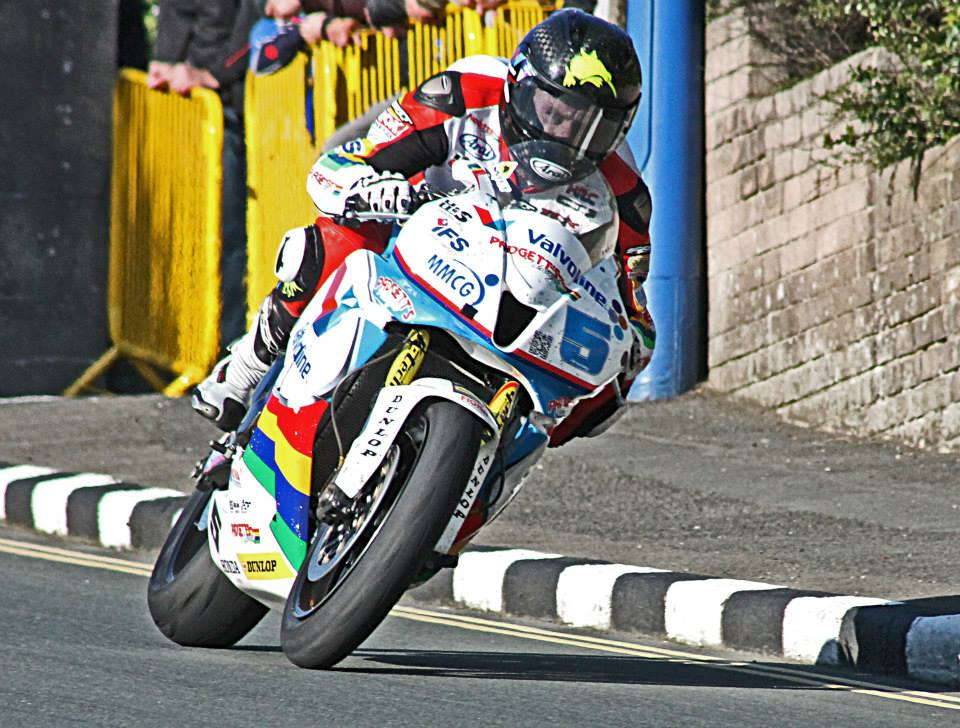
Bruce Anstey descends Bray Hill during the 2015 Supersport TT

==== Senior TT ====
The Senior TT was red flagged midway through lap 2, following an incident involving Jamie Hamilton. A restart followed with the race reduced to four laps. Anstey concluded the week's racing by taking eighth place in the restarted race.

==== 2015 TT results ====
Race	Position	Time	Speed	Replica
Superbike	1st	01:45:29.902	128.749	Silver
Supersport Race 1	2nd	01:12:18.595	125.228	Silver
Superstock	9th	01:11:47.731	126.125	Silver
TT Zero	2nd	00:19:02.785	118.857	Silver
Supersport Race 2	2nd	01:12:13.570	125.373	Silver
Senior	8th	01:10:13.264	128.953	Silver

=== 2016 ===
Remaining with Honda for 2016, it was announced that Anstey was to ride a Honda RC213V-S at the TT, specially prepared by the Valvoline Racing by Padgett's Motorcycles Team. Various adjustments had to be made to the machine in order for it to withstand six laps of the punishing 37.73 mile Snaefell Mountain Course with such parts as the wheels, the forks, the rear shocks, the brakes and the radiator guards all having to be specially made.

Anstey was enjoying a reasonably successful qualifying week until he came off his Honda Fireblade, CBR1000RR Superbike at Keppel Gate during qualifying on Thursday 2 June, as a result of which he received various injuries.

==== Superbike TT ====
After a check up at Noble's Hospital, Douglas, Anstey was passed fit to compete in the opening Superbike race on Saturday 4 June. Despite his injuries, he came home in eighth place on board the Honda RC213V-S.

==== Supersport (Race 1) ====
Anstey remained within the top-ten for the first two laps of the opening Supersport 600 race. However, following the pit stops at the end of lap 2, he subsequently retired on lap 3 at Ballacraine.

==== Superstock TT ====
Later, on 6 June, Anstey lined up on the Glencrutchery Road for the afternoon race, the Superstock TT. He retired at the TT Grandstand at the end of the opening lap.

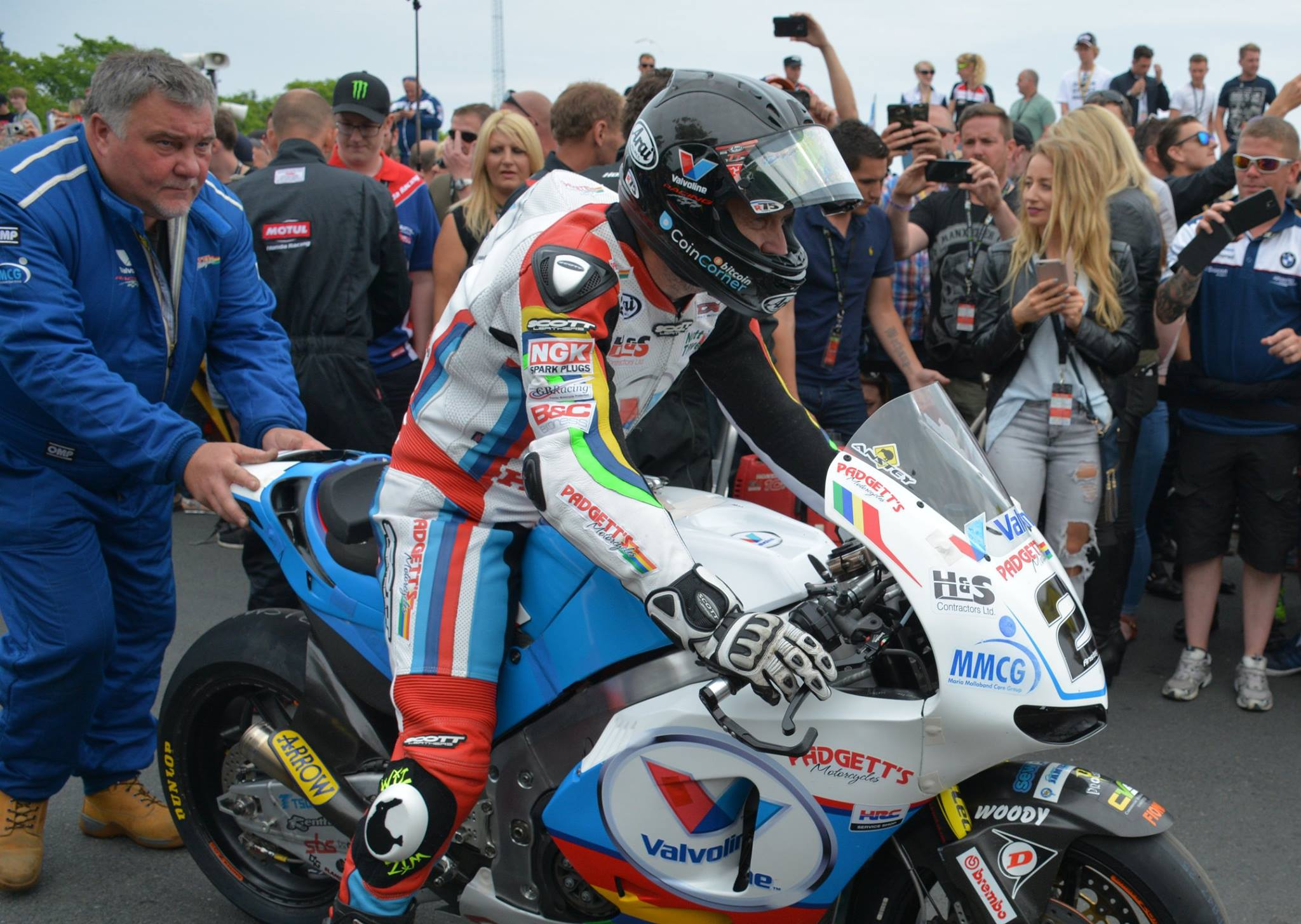
Astride the Honda RC213V-S, Anstey prepares to start the 2016 Senior TT

==== Supersport (Race 2) & TT Zero ====
A rest day during race week combined with a spell at the Isle of Man's hyperbaric chamber paid dividends for Anstey. He took fifth place in the Junior TT, followed by victory in the TT Zero, his first triumph in that particular category. Although trailing at Ballaugh Bridge to Mugen teammate John McGuinness, Anstey took the lead after McGuinness had stopped to make adjustments, leading home William Dunlop and Jamie Hamilton.

==== Senior TT ====
A further day's recuperation continued to aid Anstey prior to the Senior TT. Following a delayed start due to poor visibility, Anstey was lying in fourth place by the end of lap 1 having lapped at an average speed of 131.086 miles per hour (210.962 km/h).

With the retirement of Peter Hickman, Anstey moved up to third place at the pit stop at the end of lap 2, until he was displaced by John McGuinness at the end of lap 3. Anstey was then overtaken on corrected time by Dean Harrison following the second round of pit stops at the end of lap 4, holding fifth place until the end of the six laps.

==== 2016 TT results ====
Race	Position	Time	Speed	Replica
Superbike	8th	01:47:05.936	126.825	Silver
Supersport Race 1	DNF			
Superstock	DNF			
Supersport Race 2	5th	01:12:44.287	124.490	Silver
TT Zero	1st	00:19:07.043	118.416	Silver
Senior	5th	01:46:08.108	127.976	Silver

=== 2017 ===
In addition to his participation in the main classes at the 2017 Isle of Man TT for Padgett's Honda, it was announced on May 23 that following the injuries sustained by John McGuinness at the North West 200, and his subsequent withdrawal from the TT, Anstey had renewed his association with the Mugen Team in order to compete in the TT Zero class taking the place vacated by McGuinness.

Poor weather blighted the qualifying week at the TT, with competitors completing only a fraction of the required laps. A reshuffle of the race schedule was required with the first race day given over to qualifying and practice, meaning the traditional curtain raiser the Superbike TT moving to Sunday June 4.

==== Superbike TT ====
Anstey formed up on the Glencutchery Road with the Honda RC213V-S, having by the standards of the week, enjoyed a reasonable qualifying period. Anstey took the RC213V-S across the line in 8th place on corrected time at the end of lap 1 involving himself in a close tussle with Conor Cummins and Michael Rutter. By the pit stops at the end of the second lap, Anstey had slipped to tenth position, however he had reclaimed eighth by the end of lap 3. During lap 4, Anstey was forced to stop at Ramsey Hairpin in order to inspect the rear of the machine following concern about the degradation of the tyre, and this saw him relegated to 13th place by the time he exited the pits at the end of the lap. Working his way ahead of Horst Saiger and Sam West during lap 5, Anstey began the final lap just outside the top-ten, holding 11th place. However, over the course of the final lap he was overtaken on corrected time by both Saiger and West and after 226.38 miles (364.32 km) of racing he brought his machine home in 13th place.

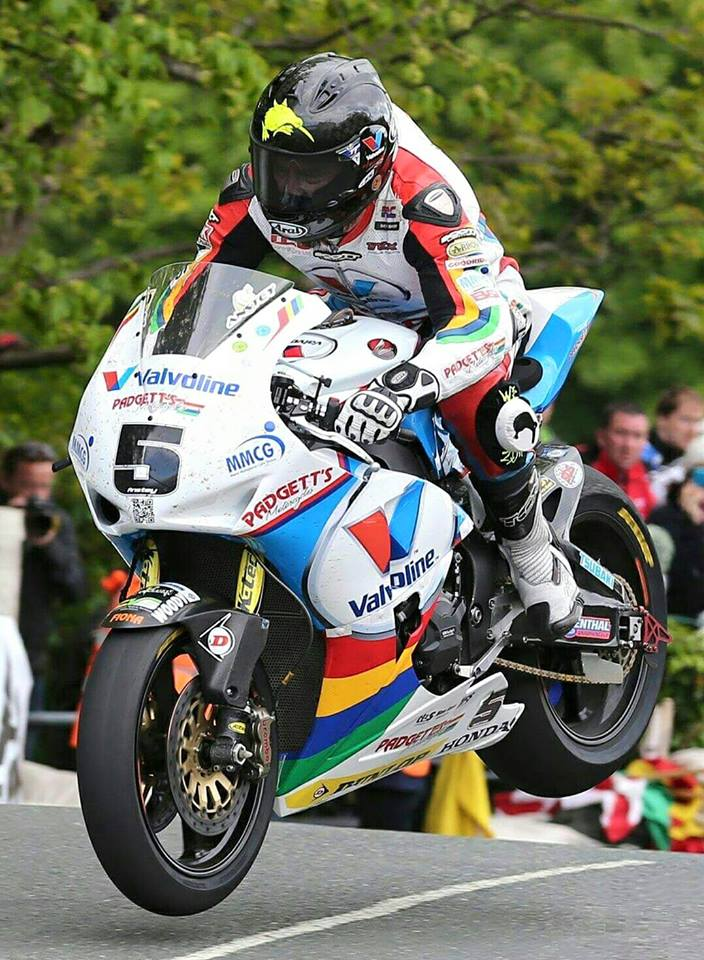
Anstey at Ballaugh Bridge

==== Supersport (Race 1) ====
The first of the Supersport 600cc races was held on the afternoon of Monday June 5. Anstey made a steady start lying in 11th place by the end of the opening lap. Progress was made during lap 2 with Anstey edging into the top-ten, having moved up to ninth place at the pit stops at the end of the lap. Continuing to work his way up the field, Anstey crossed the line in seventh place by the end of the third lap, managing to hold station until the end of the four lap race.

===== Superstock =====
Anstey suffered disappointment in the Superstock race, retiring at the pits at the end of the opening lap.

===== Supersport (Race 2) =====
Poor weather continued to plague the racing programme forcing the itinerary of the meeting to be rescheduled. As a consequence of inclement weather on Thursday June 8 the second Supersport 600cc race, the Junior TT, was cancelled.

===== TT Zero =====
Rescheduled for Friday June 9 and starting first on the road, Anstey lead the field for the one lap race from start to finish to claim his 12th TT win.

===== 2017 TT results =====
Race	Position	Time	Speed	Replica
Superbike TT	13th	1:50:18.5	123.13	Silver
Supersport Race 1	7th	1:14:27.9	121.60	Silver
Superstock	DNF			
Supersport Race 2	DNS [Race Cancelled]			
TT Zero	1st	19:13.924	117.710	Silver
Senior	DNF			

== North West 200 ==
Since his debut at the 2002 North West 200, Anstey had ten victories by 2017, making him sixth on the all-time winners list; his last victory being at the 2015 meeting.

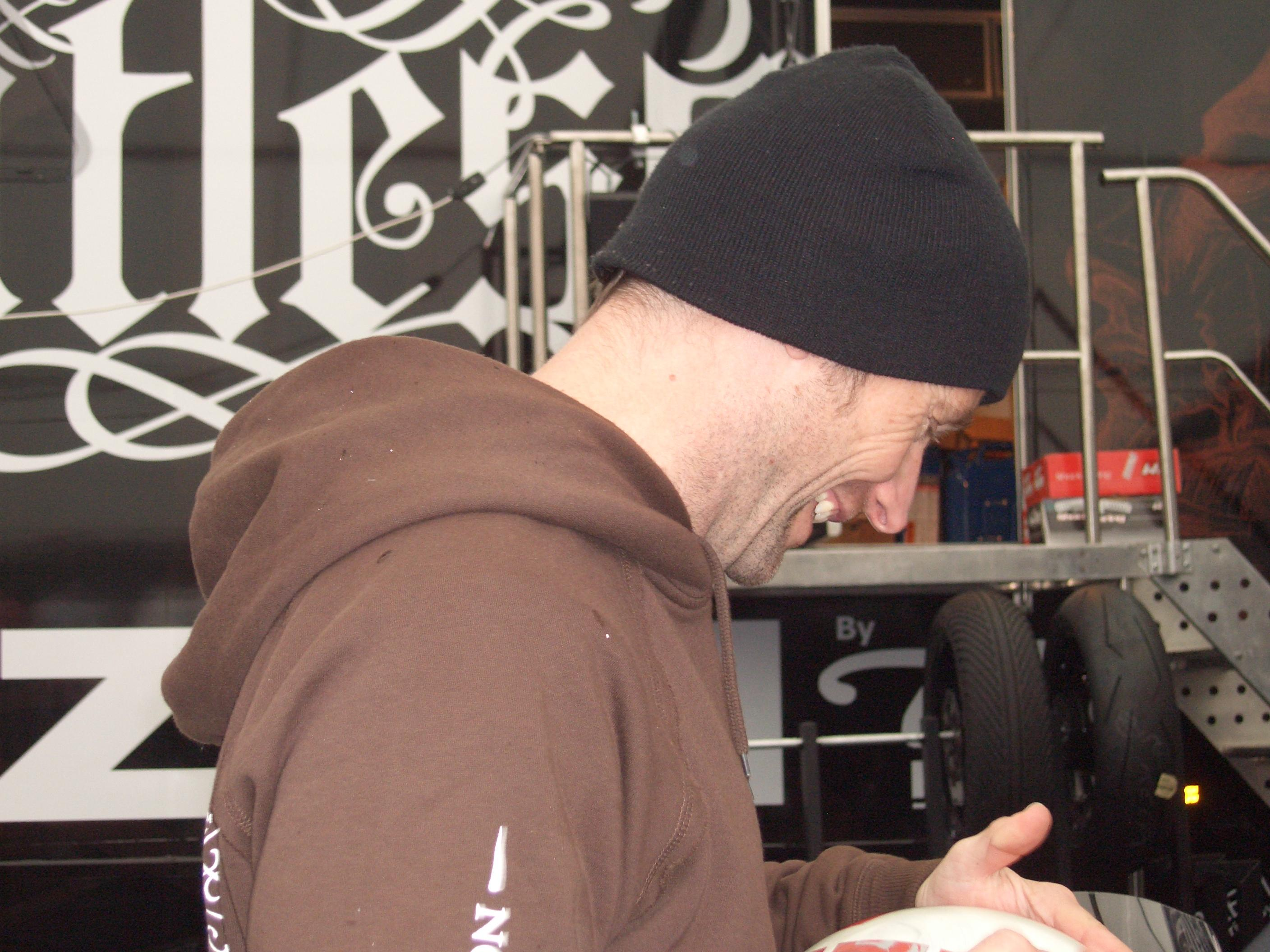
Anstey at the 2007 North West 200

=== 2002 - 2003 ===
Anstey's maiden victory came in 2002 when he won the Production race, and was on the podium at the 2003 North West.

=== 2004 ===
Making his International Road Race debut for Suzuki in 2004, Anstey won the Supersport 600cc race in addition to the Production race. Anstey was leading the Superbike race until the final lap, when he crashed.

=== 2005 ===
At the 2005 North West 200, Anstey won the rain affected Superbike event and finished runner-up to Ian Lougher in the Superstock race.

=== 2006 ===
At the 2006 meeting, Anstey won the first Supersport race and the Superstock race.

=== 2007 ===
The 2007 meeting proved to be Anstey's best year up to that date, winning a hat-trick of races. He won the two Supersport events, and the Superstock event.

=== 2008 ===
At the 2008 North West 200 Races; Anstey came fifth place in the first Superbike outing, followed by the runner-up spot in the Superstock race and fourth in the second of the Superbike races.

=== 2009 ===
The 2009 North West 200 Races saw a return to the top of the podium for Anstey, with him claiming first spot in the opening Superbike race ahead of John McGuinness which was followed up by a third and fourth place in the Superstock and Supersport races, respectively. A brace of runner-up places followed in the subsequent Supersport races.

=== 2010 ===
Opening his account with a sixth place in the first Superbike race in 2010, Anstey retired in the opening Supersport 600cc race and the Superstock before recording tenth in the feature Superbike race and concluding the meeting with third in his second Supersport outing.

=== 2011 ===
The 2011 North West 200 was blighted by misfortune including inclement weather, an oil spill and a hoax bomb alert. Only one race was able to run before the programme was curtailed and in which Anstey claimed third place in a rain sodden Supersport 600cc race.

=== 2012 ===
Again the victim of inclement weather, the 2012 North West 200 saw further interruption to the racing programme. Anstey came home in seventh place in his first outing in the Supersport category, followed with a sixth place in the Superbike race.

=== 2013 ===
Having qualified across the range of classes at the North West 200 in 2013, Anstey claimed fourth place in the opening Supersport race on Thursday May 16. However, the weather was again the main talking point of the meeting, putting paid to the majority of the race schedule on Saturday May 18. This again saw Anstey take fourth spot in a rain blighted Supersport race.

=== 2014 ===
Anstey claimed the top spot on the rostrum at the first of the Supersport races in 2014 with an average speed of 108.014 mph (173.832 km/h). However, this was his only positive in the meeting.

=== 2015 ===
The 2015 North West 200 Races again saw Anstey miss out on a podium position, coming home in fourth position. An improvement followed in the feature Superbike race when he claimed the third tier behind Alastair Seeley and Ian Hutchinson.

=== 2016 ===
At the 2016 North West 200, Anstey made a good start from a middle grid position in the opening Superbike Race. Dicing for a position within the top three, Anstey set a new absolute top speed record on the run to Coleraine at 209.8 mph (337.6 km/h). Towards the end of lap 4, he crashed his Honda Fireblade at Church Corner as a result of running a wider line. As a consequence of the crash, the race was red flagged. This was the first time at the North West that Anstey failed to take a place on the podium.

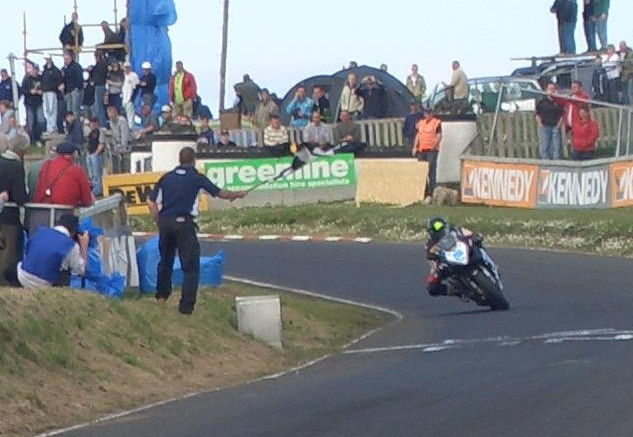
Anstey pictured taking victory in the second Supersport 600 race at the 2007 North West 200

=== 2017 ===
Anstey remained a member of the Pagett's Honda squad for the 2017 North West 200 races which saw him campaigning a Honda Fireblade in the Superbike category as well as a new Honda SP2 in the Superstock and a Honda CBR600RR in the Supersport race. In qualifying for the Supersport race, Anstey posted the eighth quickest time in the opening practice session followed by 12th quickest in the second session - although he did manage to attain the highest speed on the approach to University, clocked at 175.3 mph (282.1 km/h). Starting from row four on the grid, Anstey finished in 12th place in the Supersport race. Anstey's disappointing qualifying continued into the Superstock practice which saw him record a lowly 44th quickest time in the opening session followed by a failure to post a time in the second session and consequently he failed to start the race.

A more positive performance occurred in opening practice session for the Superbike class in which Anstey qualified 15th fastest aboard the Honda Fireblade recording a speed of 195.2 mph (314.1 km/h) through the speed trap on the approach to University. In the second session, Anstey managed to improve this by moving up to 11th quickest. Starting the race from 14th on the grid Anstey's disappointment continued as he was forced to retire at the end of lap 2.

== Ulster Grand Prix ==
Anstey has also claimed successes at the Ulster Grand Prix, taking the top step on the podium on 13 occasions.

=== 2003 - 2010 ===
At the 2003 Ulster Grand Prix, Anstey took his maiden victory, when he claimed the honors in the 1000cc Production Race. Building on his 2003 exploits, 2004 saw Anstey secure a hat-trick of successes in the Superbike, Production 600, and Production 1000 classes. Whilst failing to take the top spot in 2005, he did manage to secure two podiums. In 2006, he was victorious in the Superstock class once more. Further success belonged to Anstey at the 2010 meeting, securing another hat-trick to bring his winning tally to eight. This was Anstey's last appearance for TAS Suzuki and saw him sign off by obliterating the previous lap record, setting a new average lap speed of 133.977 mph (215.615 km/h) making him then the fastest rider on the fastest motorcycle racing circuit in the world.

=== 2011 ===
Having signed for Padgett's Honda, Anstey took a solitary victory at the 2011 meeting taking the winner's garland in the Superspport 600cc class.

=== 2012 ===
Again a single victory was all Anstey was able to secure at the 2012 UGP when he again came home at the head of the field in one of the Supersport races.

=== 2013 ===
Whilst he failed to gain top spot on the podium at the 2013 Ulster Grand Prix, the meeting saw a return to consistency for Anstey. Clinching the runner-up position in the opening Superbike race, this was followed by a brace of runner up positions in both Supersport outings and a third place in the Superstock. The signature race, the Ulster Grand Prix, saw Anstey come home in fourth place to conclude the meeting.

=== 2014 ===
Anstey's campaign at the 2014 event saw him take the honors once more in the opening Supersport race. He then enjoyed further success when he went on to win the blue riband Superbike race. Anstey's brace of wins saw him named 'Man of the Meeting'.

=== 2015 ===
At the 2015 Ulster Grand Prix, Anstey took the honours in the associated event, the Dundrod 150 as well as taking victory in the main event, in controversial circumstances. The feature event, the Ulster Grand Prix, was red flagged following an incident towards the end of lap 7. The race organisers decided to give the victory to Anstey, who had been leading at the end of lap 4, citing they could not take the standings after the fifth lap because some riders had not completed it when the red flags went up. Anstey secured victory over Ian Hutchinson who had been leading the race at the end of lap 5 (two-thirds distance).

=== 2016 ===
The 2016 Ulster Grand Prix was a meeting dominated by Ian Hutchinson, however Anstey also enjoyed a respectable meeting being reunited with the Honda RC213V-S. Having recovered from the injuries he sustained earlier in the season at the Isle of Man TT, Anstey took the runner up spot behind Hutchinson in both the Superbike races and victory in the opening (red flagged) Supersport event. Anstey concluded the meeting by taking fourth spot in the second Supersport race.

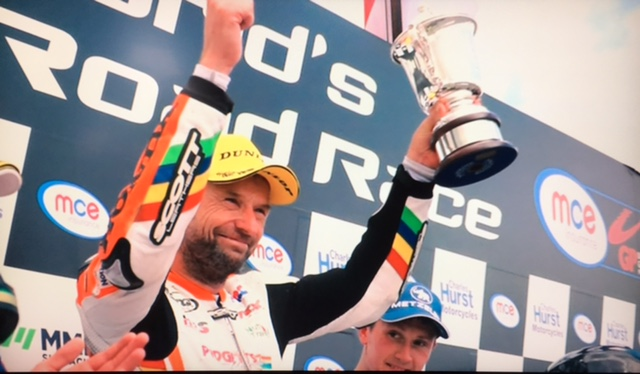
Anstey celebrates his victory in the Superbike Race at the 2017 Ulster Grand Prix

=== 2017 ===
Anstey's participation at the 2017 Ulster Grand Prix was confirmed in mid July. A press release from the Padgett's Honda Team confirmed Anstey would campaign both a Honda RC213V-S and for the Classic Lightweight event, a Honda RS250.

Anstey enjoyed renewed success, with a first and second in two of the three Supersport 600 cc races. In his first outing Anstey took a second aboard the Pagett's Honda behind Man of the Meeting, Peter Hickman. Anstey fared less well when he retired the Padgett's Honda RS250R at the end of the opening lap due to mechanical problems. feature race Anstey's luck returned for the Superbike feature race, which saw Anstey secure a maiden win in an International Road Race for the Honda RC213V-S. The race saw Anstey dicing at the head of the pack with up to five other riders in which lap records tumbled, and it finally came down to a two-way duel between Anstey and Hickman on the final lap. Taking the lead midway through the lap at Joey's Windmill, Anstey held on from Hickman to claim his first victory since 2015. In his second outing in the Supersport 600 cc class, Anstey finished second behind Hickman, who claimed a popular hat-trick at the event.

== Classic TT ==
Following changes to the Manx Grand Prix Races in 2013, the Classic TT became part of the newly revamped festival allowing established TT competitors the opportunity to compete on classic and post-classic machinery.

=== 2013 ===
Anstey campaigned a classic bike at the 2013 Classic TT. He failed to finish in the Bennett's 500cc Classic on which he rode a 1961 Manx Norton.

==== 2013 Classic TT results ====
Race	Position	Time	Speed	Replica
Classic 500cc	DNF	21:03.303		

=== 2014 ===
At the 2014 Manx Festival of Motorcycling, Anstey was entered in the 500cc Classic TT and Formula 1 Classic TT. Again on board the Manx Norton, Anstey took third in the 500cc Classic and notched up his maiden victory at the event when he took a Padgett's Yamaha YZR500 to first place in the Formula 1 Classic.

==== 2014 Classic TT results ====
Race	Position	Time	Speed	Replica
Classic 500cc	3rd	1:24:47.027	106.803	Silver
Formula 1 Classic TT	1st	55:41.219	121.597	Silver

=== 2015 ===
Entering in the Motorsport Merchandise F1/F2 Classic TT, Anstey lined up astride the same Padgett's Yamaha YZR500 which he had taken to first place in the Formula 1 Classic the previous year. A strong depth of field joined Anstey on the grid as he went head to head with Michael Dunlop, Michael Rutter, Ryan Farquhar and Peter Hickman amongst others.

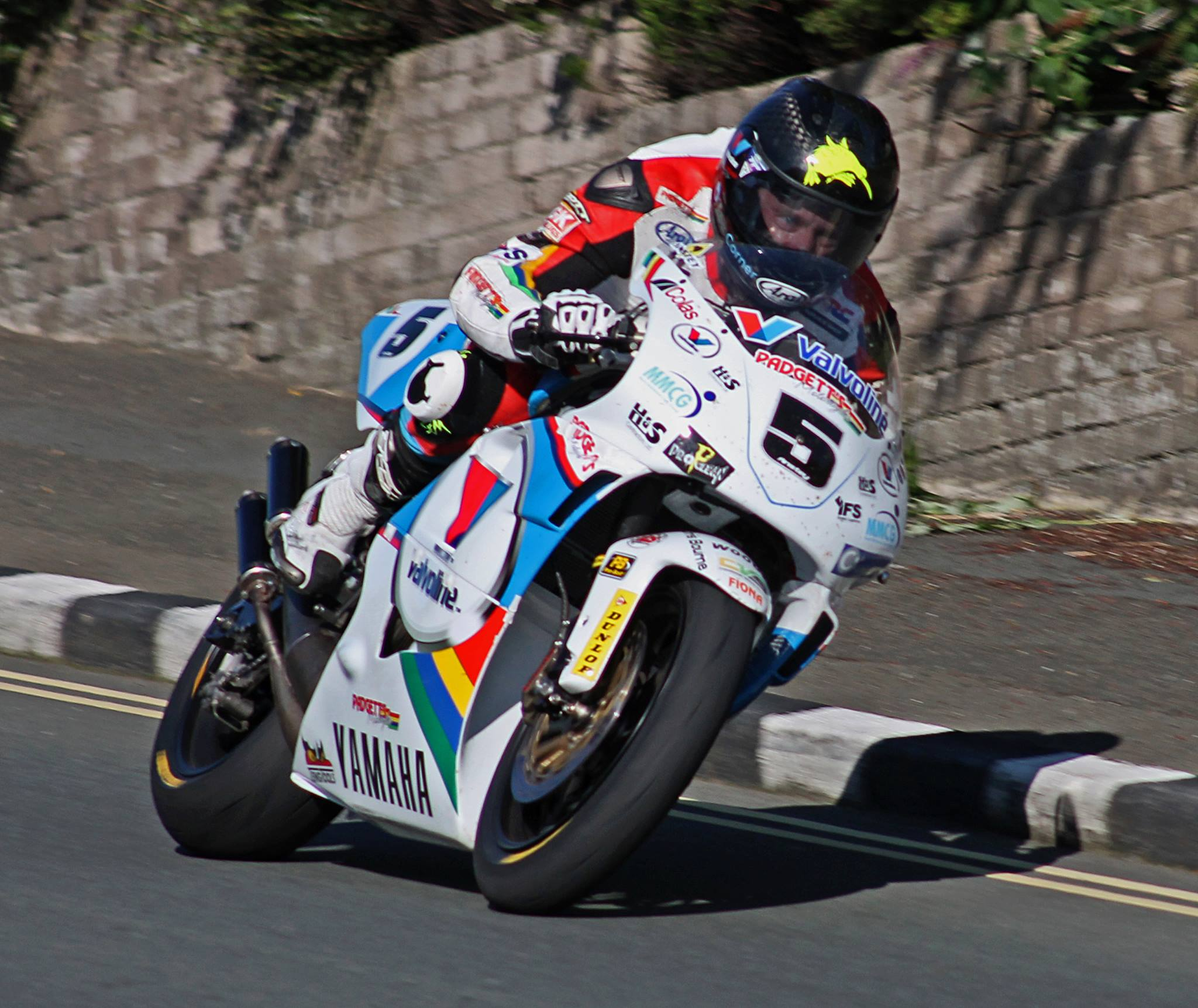
Anstey on the Padgett's Yamaha YZR500 during the 2015 F1/F2 Classic TT

As a consequence of various delays during the course of the day, racing finally got underway at 5pm with Anstey's Yamaha YZR500 pitted against Suzuki, Kawasaki and Yamaha Superbikes. Tussling with the pugnacious Dunlop at the head of the field, Anstey crossed the line in first place at the end of the opening lap with a time of 18:13.707 producing an average speed of 124.190. As the second lap progressed, Anstey began to secure the lead from Dunlop taking an increasing advantage into the third lap. However, Anstey was then black flagged as he approached Cronk-ny-Mona at the end of lap 3. The result of this being Anstey having to return to the pits with a loose left exhaust.

The Valvoline Racing by Padgetts Motorcycles team battled to fix the problem and Anstey rejoined the race, but he had lost a minute to Michael Dunlop, handing victory to Dunlop on a plate. Anstey had the consolation of clawing back a gap of over thirty seconds on James Hillier on the last lap and with Ryan Farquhar losing time on the Mountain section, Anstey snatched second place by a second from Farquhar.

==== 2015 Classic TT results ====
Race	Position	Time	Speed	Replica
Motorsport Merchandise F1 Classic TT	2nd	1:14:41.154	121.244	Silver

=== 2016 ===
Anstey enjoyed success in the Classic 250cc race, leading from start to finish. Campaigning a Padgett's Honda RS250R, he recorded a fastest lap of 118.74 mph breaking John McGuinness' lap record which had stood since 1999. Anstey is now the current lap record holder on the Snaefell Mountain Course in both two stroke categories, set at the Classic TT.

Anstey failed to make an impact in the Superbike Race. On board the Padgett's Yamaha YZR500 Anstey was lying in 8th place at the end of the opening lap behind a rampaging Michael Dunlop, who went on to break Anstey's lap record for the Superbike class (although Anstey's record for two stroke machinery still stands). Anstey made no impression at the head of the field, and retired on lap four at Glen Tramman.

==== 2016 Classic TT results ====
Race	Position	Time	Speed	Replica
Sure Lightweight 250cc Classic TT	1st	1:18:04.437	115.982	Silver
Motorsport Merchandise Superbike Race Classic TT	DNF			

=== 2017 ===
Anstey returned to the Isle of Man for the Classic TT Races in August, 2017. Practice saw him amongst the higher end of the field prior to his opening race, the Dunlop Classic Lightweight TT. On a Honda RS250R, Anstey lead the field from the start during the four lap race, breaking his previous year's lap record, becoming the first 250 cc rider to pass the 120 mph barrier, recording a fastest lap of 120.181 mph (193.413 km/h).

==== 2017 Classic TT results ====
Race	Position	Time	Speed	Replica
Dunlop Classic Lightweight 250cc TT	1st	1:16:50.072	117.853	Silver
Superbike Race Classic TT				

=== 2019 ===
Having recovered sufficiently from the effects of his cancer treatment, Anstey made a return to racing at the 2019 Classic TT in August. From the start of the four-lap post-classic 250 cc race, Anstey took the lead bringing his 250 cc Honda into first place by a margin of 70 seconds over his team mate, Davey Todd.

==== 2019 Classic TT results ====
Race	Position	Time	Speed	Replica
Classic Lightweight 250cc TT	1st	58:47.513	115.515	Silver

== Personal life ==
Together with his partner, Anny, Anstey spends his time away from racing at his home in Cullybackey, County Antrim, having moved there from Windsor, or in New Zealand.

=== Illness ===
Anstey's racing career suffered a setback in 1995 when he was diagnosed with testicular cancer. Having made his first appearance at the Isle of Man TT Races in 1996, he was forced to miss the 1997 meeting as a consequence of undergoing treatment. Although being declared free of the disease, he has stated that he still feels the lingering effects part of which affect his immune system.

In April 2018, it was revealed that Anstey needed treatment after several cancerous tumours had been found in his lungs and on his spine, in addition to a blood clot on one of his lungs, which ruled him out of racing for the 2018 season.

Anstey underwent an operation in 2019. In an interview with the BBC in September 2021, he stated that he believes the operation to have been successful, however he still has to undergo blood tests every three months.

== Pre-ride rituals ==
On numerous occasions prior to races, a traditional New Zealand Haka has been performed for Anstey. He also received a Haka following his win at the 2015 Ulster Grand Prix.

== Helmets ==
Anstey is contracted to the Arai Helmet Company, his current helmet design is the Arai RX7-RC.

== Awards ==
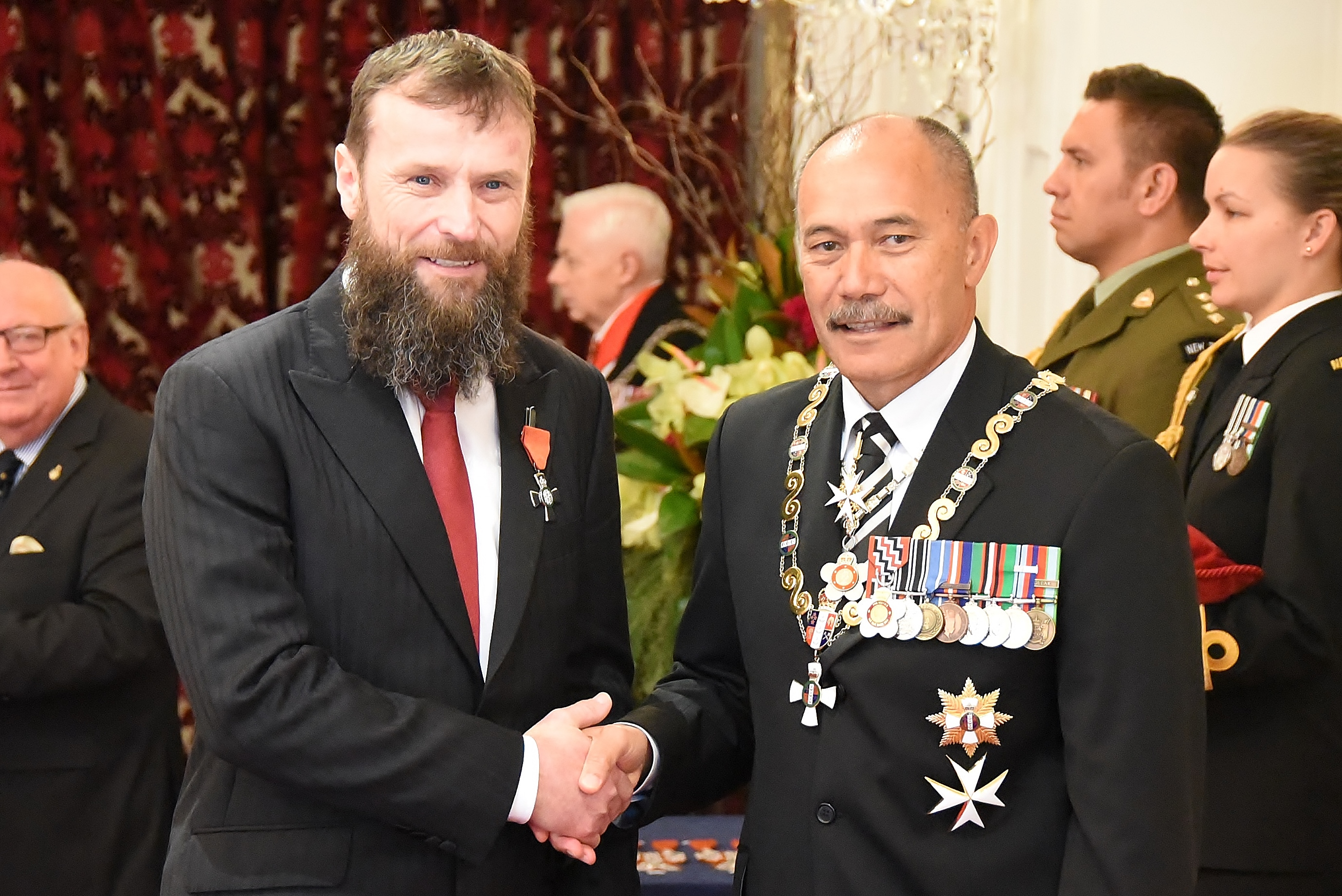
Anstey (left) in 2016, after his investiture as a Member of the New Zealand Order of Merit by the governor-general, Sir Jerry Mateparae

In the 2015 New Year Honours, Anstey was appointed a Member of the New Zealand Order of Merit for services to motorsport.

Bruce was inducted into the Motorcycle NZ Hall of fame on 15 May 2021.

== Complete TT record ==
2017	Superbike TT; 13	Supersport TT 1; 7	Superstock TT; DNF	Supersport TT 2 Cancelled	TT Zero; 1	Senior TT; DNF
2016	Superbike TT; 8	Supersport TT 1 DNF	Superstock TT; DNF	Supersport TT 2; 5	TT Zero; 1	Senior TT; 5
2015	Superbike TT; 1	Supersport TT 1; 2	Superstock TT; 9	TT Zero; 2	Supersport TT 2; 2	Senior TT; 8
2014	Superbike TT; 4	Supersport TT 1; 2	Superstock TT; 3	TT Zero; 2	Supersport TT 2; 2	Senior TT; 4
2013	Superbike TT; 8	Supersport TT 1; 2	Superstock TT; 5	Supersport TT 2; 2	Senior TT; 3	
2012	Superbike TT; 3	Supersport TT 1; 1	Superstock TT; 4	Supersport TT 2; 4	Senior TT; Cancelled	
2011	Superbike TT; DNF	Supersport TT 1; 1	Superstock TT; DNF	Supersport TT 2; 5	Senior TT; 3	
2010	Superbike TT; 11	Supersport TT 1 DNF	Superstock TT; DNF	Supersport TT 2; 8	Senior TT; 3	
2009	Superbike TT; DNF	Supersport TT 1 DNF	Superstock TT; DNF	Supersport TT 2; 2	Senior TT; DNF	
2008	Superbike TT; 2	Supersport Junior TT 1 DSQ	Superstock TT; DNF	Supersport Junior TT 2; 1	Senior TT; DNF	
2007	Superbike TT; DNF	Superstock TT; 1	Supersport TT; 4	Senior TT; DNF		
2006	Superbike TT; DNF	Superstock TT; 1	Supersport TT; 2	Senior TT; 3		
2005	Superbike TT; DNF	Superstock TT; 1	Supersport TT 1; 4	Supersport TT 2 DNF	Senior TT; DNF	
2004	Formula1 TT; 3	Production 1000 TT; 1	Junior TT; 2	Production 600 TT; 2	Senior TT; 2	
2003	Production 1000 TT; 2	Junior TT; 1	Production 600 TT; 8	Senior TT; 7		
2002	Formula 1 TT; DNF	Ultra-lightweight 125 TT; 10	Production 1000 TT; 3	Lightweight 250 TT; 1	Production 600 TT; 2	
2000	Lightweight 250 TT; 2	Senior TT; 14				
1999	Lightweight 250 TT; 7	Senior TT; 24				
1998	Lightweight 250 TT; 26	Senior TT; 20				
1996	Lightweight 250 TT; 29	Senior TT; DNF				

=== Classic TT ===
2019	Lightweight 250cc Classic TT; 1	
2017	Lightweight 250cc Classic TT; 1	Superbike Classic TT; 1
2016	Lightweight 250cc Classic TT; 1	Superbike Classic TT; DNF
2015	Formula 1 Classic TT; 2	
2014	Classic 500 TT; 3	Formula 1 Classic TT; 1
2013	500cc Classic TT; DNF	
