= 2003 Isle of Man TT =

Annual motorcycle racing event

Isle of Man TT Mountain Course

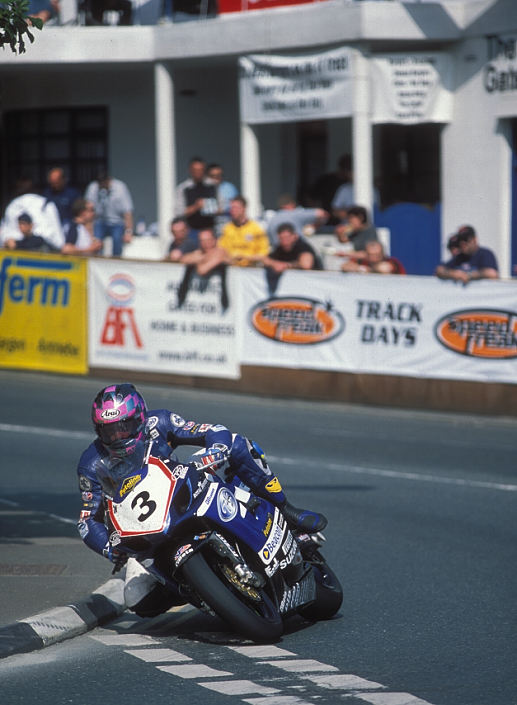
Formula One TT winner Adrian Archibald at Quarterbridge

The 2003 Isle of Man TT was the 96th edition of the event. It was marred by the high-profile death of outright lap record holder and nine-time TT winner David Jefferies during practice. Jefferies crashed at around 180 mph (290 km/h) at Crosby, due to a patch of oil that was not signalled by the marshals. In the aftermath of Jefferies' crash, Jim Moodie's neck was hit by the cables of a telegraph pole laid down by the accident, but he was not seriously injured. Friend and rival of Jefferies John McGuinness was one of the first riders on the scene, and described it to be "like a war zone".

Two riders took two wins during the event: Shaun Harris and Adrian Archibald. Shaun Harris won the Production 600 and 1000 races, the only two TT podiums of his career. Adrian Archibald took an emotional Formula One TT win, which he dedicated to his former team-mate David Jefferies, and then won the prestigious Senior TT.

Fog was a recurring issue during the final few days of the event, causing delays and shortened race distances for the Production 600 TT and Senior TT.

== Results ==
=== Race 1 - Formula One TT ===
| Rank | Number | Rider | Machine | Time | Speed (mph) |
|---|---|---|---|---|---|
| 1 | 3 | (Northern Ireland) Adrian Archibald | Suzuki | 1.50.15.7 | 123.18 |
| 2 | 9 | (Wales) Ian Lougher | Honda | 1.51.30.5 | 121.80 |
| 3 | 4 | (England) John McGuinness | Ducati | 1.52.35.5 | 120.63 |
| 4 | 8 | (Wales) Jason Griffiths | Yamaha | 1.52.37.4 | 120.60 |
| 5 | 10 | (Northern Ireland) Ryan Farquhar | Suzuki | 1.53.07.8 | 120.06 |
| 6 | 13 | (New Zealand) Shaun Harris | Suzuki | 1.53.41.8 | 119.46 |

=== Race 2 - Sidecar Race A ===
| Rank | Number | Rider | Passenger | Machine | Time | Speed (mph) |
|---|---|---|---|---|---|---|
| 1 | 2 | (England) Ian Bell | Neil Carpenter | DMR Bell Yamaha | 1 01 39.0 | 110.16 |
| 2 | 9 | (Isle of Man) Nick Crowe | Darren Hope | Ireson | 1 02 30.6 | 108.64 |
| 3 | 11 | (England) Steve Norbury | Andrew Smith | Shelbourne Yamaha | 1 02 54.3 | 107.96 |
| 4 | 18 | (England) Andrew Laidlow | Patrick Farrance | Baker Yamaha | 1 03 13.8 | 107.40 |
| 5 | 14 | (England) Tony Baker | Mark Hegarty | Baker Yamaha | 1 04 12.3 | 105.77 |
| 6 | 6 | (England) Allan Schofield | Mark Cox | Jacobs | 1 04 13.6 | 105.74 |

=== Race 3 - Lightweight 400cc ===
| Rank | Number | Rider | Machine | Time | Speed (mph) |
|---|---|---|---|---|---|
| 1 | 4 | (England) John McGuinness | Honda | 1.22.40.97 | 109.52 |
| 2 | 2 | (Northern Ireland) Richard Britton | Honda | 1.23.07.29 | 108.94 |
| 3 | 8 | (Northern Ireland) Ryan Farquhar | Kawasaki | 1.23.23.21 | 108.59 |
| 4 | 6 | (Isle of Man) Dave Madsen-Mygdal | Honda | 1.24.28.96 | 107.18 |
| 5 | 12 | (England) Robert J Price | Yamaha | 1.26.00.42 | 105.28 |
| 6 | 15 | Alan Bennie | Yamaha FZR | 1.27.34.27 | 103.40 |

=== Race 4 - Ultralightweight 125cc ===
| Rank | Number | Rider | Machine | Time | Speed (mph) |
|---|---|---|---|---|---|
| 1 | 62 | (England) Chris Palmer | Honda | 1.23.20.57 | 108.65 |
| 2 | 61 | (England) Michael Wilcox | Honda | 1.24.00.46 | 107.79 |
| 3 | 69 | (Wales) Ian Lougher | Honda | 1.24.21.04 | 107.35 |
| 4 | 63 | (Northern Ireland) Robert Dunlop | Honda | 1.24.47.25 | 106.80 |
| 5 | 71 | (Isle of Man) Nigel Beattie | Mannin Honda | 1.27.15.22 | 103.78 |
| 6 | 65 | (Wales) Paul Owen | Honda | 1.28.43.71 | 102.06 |

=== Race 5 - International Production 1000 ===
| Rank | Number | Rider | Machine | Time | Speed (mph) |
|---|---|---|---|---|---|
| 1 | 13 | (New Zealand) Shaun Harris | Suzuki | 55.39.38 | 122.02 |
| 2 | 15 | (New Zealand) Bruce Anstey | Suzuki | 55.55.42 | 121.44 |
| 3 | 10 | (Northern Ireland) Ryan Farquhar | Suzuki | 56.10.50 | 120.90 |
| 4 | 2 | (Northern Ireland) Richard Britton | Suzuki | 56.20.87 | 120.53 |
| 5 | 20 | (England) Chris Heath | Suzuki | 56.52.84 | 119.40 |
| 6 | 8 | (Wales) Jason Griffiths | Yamaha | 57.07.66 | 118.88 |

=== Race 6 - Junior 600cc ===
| Rank | Number | Rider | Machine | Time | Speed (mph) |
|---|---|---|---|---|---|
| 1 | 12 | (New Zealand) Bruce Anstey | Triumph | 1.15.13.98 | 120.36 |
| 2 | 9 | (Wales) Ian Lougher | Honda | 1.15.24.94 | 120.07 |
| 3 | 3 | (Northern Ireland) Adrian Archibald | Suzuki | 1.15.30.00 | 119.94 |
| 4 | 10 | (Northern Ireland) Ryan Farquhar | Kawasaki | 1.15.31.15 | 119.91 |
| 5 | 13 | (New Zealand) Shaun Harris | Suzuki | 1.15.48.42 | 119.45 |
| 6 | 8 | (Wales) Jason Griffiths | Yamaha | 1.15.54.72 | 119.29 |

=== Race 7 - Sidecar Race B ===
| Rank | Number | Rider | Passenger | Machine | Time | Speed (mph) |
|---|---|---|---|---|---|---|
| 1 | 1 | (Isle of Man) Dave Molyneux | Craig Hallam | DMR Honda | 1.04.25.17 | 105.42 |
| 2 | 9 | (Isle of Man) Nick Crowe | Darren Hope | Ireson | 1.05.15.67 | 104.07 |
| 3 | 3 | (England) Greg Lambert | Daniel Sayle | Molyneux | 1.06.17.31 | 102.45 |
| 4 | 8 | (England) Ben Dixon | Mark Lambert | Molyneux | 1.06.37.02 | 101.95 |
| 5 | 16 | (England) Geoff Bell | Jake Beckworth | DMR Yamaha | 1.06.48.06 | 101.67 |
| 6 | 7 | (England) John Holden | Colin Hardman | Fanuc Yamaha | 1.07.15.87 | 100.97 |

=== Race 8 - Production 600 ===
| Rank | Number | Rider | Machine | Time | Speed (mph) |
|---|---|---|---|---|---|
| 1 | 13 | (New Zealand) Shaun Harris | Suzuki | 37.49.79 | 119.68 |
| 2 | 9 | (Wales) Ian Lougher | Honda | 38.06.10 | 118.83 |
| 3 | 10 | (Northern Ireland) Ryan Farquhar | Kawasaki | 38.10.17 | 118.62 |
| 4 | 3 | (Northern Ireland) Adrian Archibald | Suzuki | 38.13.25 | 118.46 |
| 5 | 8 | (Wales) Jason Griffiths | Yamaha | 38.17.08 | 118.26 |
| 6 | 5 | (Northern Ireland) Richard Britton | Honda | 38.31.98 | 117.50 |

=== Race 9 - Senior TT ===
| Rank | Number | Rider | Machine | Time | Speed (mph) |
|---|---|---|---|---|---|
| 1 | 0 | (Northern Ireland) Adrian Archibald | Suzuki | 1.12.42.9 | 124.53 |
| 2 | 2 | (England) John McGuinness | Ducati | 1.13.03.7 | 123.93 |
| 3 | 7 | (Wales) Ian Lougher | Honda | 1.13.29.5 | 123.21 |
| 4 | 3 | (Wales) Jason Griffiths | Yamaha | 1.13.44.1 | 122.80 |
| 5 | 4 | (Northern Ireland) Ryan Farquhar | Suzuki | 1.14.00.1 | 122.36 |
| 6 | 6 | (New Zealand) Shaun Harris | Suzuki | 1.14.15.0 | 121.95 |
