= TAS Racing =

British motorcycle racing team

- 2026 name: Cheshire Mouldings Yamaha
- Base: Moneymore, County Londonderry, Northern Ireland
- Team principal/s: Philip Neill
- Race riders: British Superbike Championship: 11 Rory Skinner; 52 Danny Kent
- Motorcycle: Yamaha YZF-R1
- Tyres: Pirelli

TAS Racing (Temple Auto Salvage) is a motorcycle road racing team based in Moneymore, County Londonderry, Northern Ireland. Owned by Hector Neill, with his son Philip Neill as the team manager, the team has been known under a series of names: TAS Suzuki (2000–2006); Relentless Suzuki (2007–2011) an energy drink product of Coca-Cola; Tyco Suzuki (2012–2014) a security services supplier. In late 2014, after a 15-year partnership with Suzuki, the team signed to become the road racing partner for BMW Motorrad.

Originally known as Hector Neill racing, they set up under a tent in the paddock and worked on a picnic table as the workbench. TAS Racing would not be officially formed until 17 years later.

== British Championship ==
In 2007, Michael Laverty and Ian Lowry rode for the Relentless Suzuki team in the British Supersport Championship. Laverty came out on top of a Relentless 1–2 in the championship, taking 6 wins to Lowry's 1.

For 2008 the team stepped up to the full British Superbike Championship for the first time, with Laverty the sole rider. He finished 9th in a consistent season, just failing to make the podium on several occasions. Lowry continued in Supersport, taking 2 wins and 3 further podiums on his way to third in the series.

Laverty departed for the AMA Superbike Championship in 2009, allowing Lowry to move onto the superbike alongside Atsushi Watanabe. Lowry had a strong year, finishing fifth overall and narrowly missing out on the team's maiden podium a few times. Watanabe struggled for much of the year, amassing only 14 points and never breaking into the top ten. The team did not enter a Supersport bike for this year, but instead fielded a Superstock GSXR1000 for roads rider Alastair Seeley, who won the championship in dominant fashion. Seeley won the first 9 rounds, and took 3rd in the tenth before stepping up to the BSB class for the final 2 rounds. Seeley will be joined by the returning Laverty in BSB for 2010.

In 2010, Laverty finished strongly, always finishing inside the top 10, including a maiden win for the team in a damp and difficult race 2 at Oulton Park. After Oulton Park, Laverty was fourth in the standings with 65 points after 3 rounds. Alastair Seeley has also been strong, only dropping out of the top 6 once, also getting a podium (3rd) and only narrowly missing out on another 3rd in Oulton Park. Alastair Seeley is currently fifth in the standings. Both are currently on to qualify for the 'Showdown'.

== Road Racing ==
=== TAS Suzuki: 2000-2014 ===
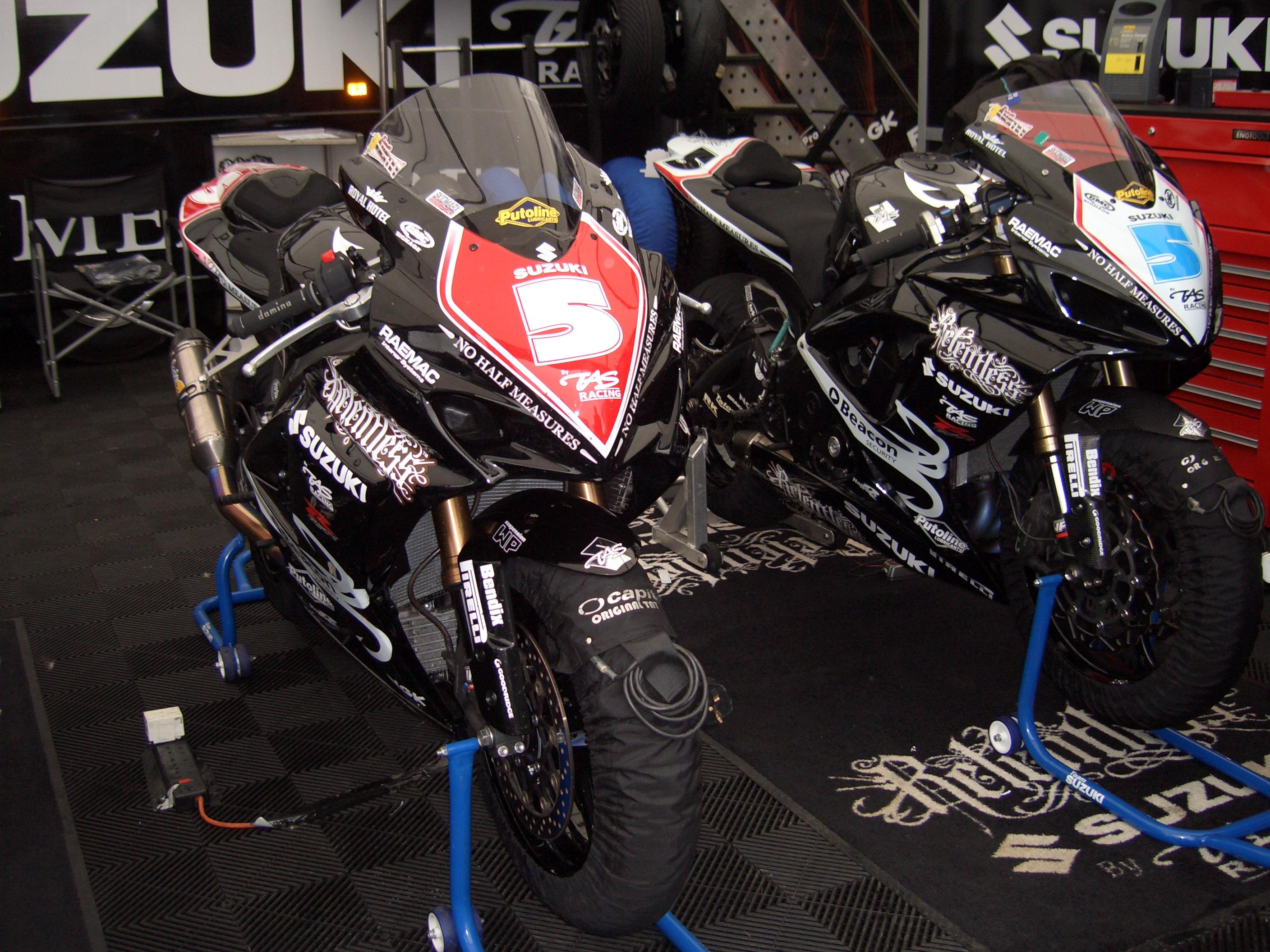
Relentless Suzuki bikes, ridden by Bruce Anstey

Adrian Archibald and Bruce Anstey rode for the team in 2007. After enjoying much success on the road racing scene as TAS Suzuki, the Relentless Suzuki team seemed to have started where they left off. At the North West 200, Bruce Anstey scored a hat-trick of race victories for Relentless, and at the TT he scored another win in the Superstock race.

For the 2008 season, the team signed Australian rider Cameron Donald to ride in the International road races and one of the British Championship classes.

Philip Neill was extremely pleased with his signing, saying, "Cameron is a phenomenally talented rider with a good level of technical ability. He also has a great personality and PR skills to match, so obviously we are delighted to have him on board for 2008. My dad and I have actually had our eye on him for quite some time. He was unlucky to miss out on some international races this year due to injury, but he has all but dominated the national scene in Ireland for the past two years. His second place at the 2006 TT in the Senior race was very impressive, especially as he also recorded a lap of 128mph in only his second appearance in the Isle of Man."

At the 2008 Isle of Man TT Donald led Anstey home in a Relentless 1-2 in the Superbike race. Donald then won the Superstock race and Anstey the Supersport in another successful campaign. They were unable to repeat these results in 2009, Donald breaking the lap record in practice but then being forced to miss the races after injuring his back and shoulder and Anstey claiming a solitary second place in the second Supersport race after being plagued by reliability issues.

The 2009 North West 200 Races were more successful, Anstey claiming second places in the supersport and superbike races, with Donald placing fourth in the latter, and Seeley winning the superstock race.

The Isle of Man TT 2010 was almost a complete wash out for the relentless team with only one podium coming from Bruce Anstey on the Friday Senior TT race. In 2011 TAS Racing signed Guy Martin to their road racing Team. Martin was joined in 2012 by Conor Cummins, who subsequently left the team after the 2013 season. Cummins was replaced by William Dunlop.

=== TAS BMW Motorrad ===
In October 2014, the team confirmed a deal to move to BMW Motorrad supplied BMW S1000RR, retaining riders William Dunlop and Guy Martin. Dunlop never fully realised his potential with the team, and subsequently left at the end of 2015. Replacing Dunlop was Ian Hutchinson, who signed following the decision by Paul Bird Motorsport not to compete at the major road racing events in 2016. Martin was retained alongside Hutchinson, however he had intimated during the closed season that due to other commitments he would not be participating at the North West 200 or the Isle of Man TT. Martin's place at the 2016 North West 200 and 2016 Isle of Man TT was taken by Ryan Farquhar; however, Farquhar suffered significant injuries whilst competing during the opening Super Twin race at the North West meeting, ruling him out for the rest of the 2016 season. After his success, Ian Hutchinson was retained for 2017 as the sole rider for the Tyco roads campaign. He suffered a heavy crash during the 2017 Isle of Man TT and was subsequently out for the rest of the season. Dan Kneen was brought onboard for the Ulster Grand Prix in August 2017. With Hutchinson and TAS parting company, Kneen was retained for the 2018 season. Michael Dunlop was announced as the main rider for TAS Tyco BMW for 2018, whilst maintaining his own MD Racing team running his own Superstock and Supersport machines, back on BMW superbikes after a year with Suzuki. Dan Kneen sustained fatal injuries during practice for the 2018 Isle of Man TT. Dunlop dedicated his Superbike win to his late team mate after the first race of the week. In July, former TAS Racing rider William Dunlop, brother of Michael, died in a practice crash during the Skerries 100 races in Southern Ireland. Michael sat out the remainder of the season. Australia's Davo Johnson was brought in for the 2018 Ulster Grand Prix, to ride a BMW HP4 Race.

=== Riders ===
| Year | Riders | Motorcycle |
|---|---|---|
| 2002 | (England) David Jefferies, (Wales) Ian Lougher | Suzuki GSX-R1000 |
| 2003 | (Northern Ireland) Adrian Archibald | Suzuki GSX-R1000 |
| 2004 | (New Zealand) Bruce Anstey, (Northern Ireland) Adrian Archibald | Suzuki GSX-R1000 |
| 2005 | (New Zealand) Bruce Anstey, (Northern Ireland) Adrian Archibald | Suzuki GSX-R1000 |
| 2006 | (New Zealand) Bruce Anstey, (Northern Ireland) Adrian Archibald | Suzuki GSX-R1000 |
| 2007 | (New Zealand) Bruce Anstey, (Northern Ireland) Adrian Archibald | Suzuki GSX-R1000 |
| 2008 | (New Zealand) Bruce Anstey, (Australia) Cameron Donald | Suzuki GSX-R1000 |
| 2009 | (New Zealand) Bruce Anstey, (Australia) Cameron Donald | Suzuki GSX-R1000 |
| 2010 | (New Zealand) Bruce Anstey, (Australia) Cameron Donald | Suzuki GSX-R1000 |
| 2011 | (England) Guy Martin, (France) Guillaume Dietrich | Suzuki GSX-R1000 |
| 2012 | (England) Guy Martin, (Isle of Man) Conor Cummins | Suzuki GSX-R1000 |
| 2013 | (England) Guy Martin, (Isle of Man) Conor Cummins | Suzuki GSX-R1000 |
| 2014 | (England) Guy Martin, (Northern Ireland) William Dunlop | Suzuki GSX-R1000 |
| 2015 | (England) Guy Martin, (Northern Ireland) William Dunlopp | BMW S1000RR |
| 2016 | (England) Guy Martin, (England) Ian Hutchinson, (Northern Ireland) Ryan Farquhar | BMW S1000RR |
| 2017 | (England) Ian Hutchinson, (Isle of Man) Dan Kneen | BMW S1000RR |
| 2018 | (Northern Ireland) Michael Dunlop, (Isle of Man) Dan Kneen, (Australia) David Johnson | BMW S1000RR |
| 2019 | (Northern Ireland) Michael Dunlop | BMW S1000RR |
| 2022 | (England) Ian Hutchinson | BMW M1000RR |
| 2024 | (England) Davey Todd | BMW M1000RR |
| 2025 | (Scotland) Rory Skinner | Ducati Panigale V4R |
| 2026 | (Scotland) Rory Skinner, (England) Danny Kent | Yamaha YZF-R1 |

== Statistics ==
=== British Superbike Championship ===
| Year | Rider | 1 | | 2 | | 3 | | 4 | | 5 | | 6 | | 7 | | | 8 | | | 9 | | | 10 | | 11 | | 12 | | | Pos | Pts | Ref |
| Year | Rider | R1 | R2 | R1 | R2 | R1 | R2 | R1 | R2 | R1 | R2 | R1 | R2 | R1 | R2 | R3 | R1 | R2 | R3 | R1 | R2 | R3 | R1 | R2 | R1 | R2 | R1 | R2 | R3 | Pos | Pts | Ref |
|---|---|---|---|---|---|---|---|---|---|---|---|---|---|---|---|---|---|---|---|---|---|---|---|---|---|---|---|---|---|---|---|---|
| 2009 | (Northern Ireland) Ian Lowry | BHI; 13 | BHI; 19 | OUL; 7 | OUL; 6 | DON; 8 | DON; 6 | THR; 19 | THR; 8 | SNE; 5 | SNE; 7 | KNO; 6 | KNO; Ret | MAL; 8 | MAL; 20 | | BHGP; 12 | BHGP; 12 | BHGP; 9 | CAD; 4 | CAD; Ret | | CRO; 5 | CRO; 7 | SIL; 8 | SIL; 9 | OUL; 8 | OUL; Ret | OUL; 4 | 5th | 170 | |
| 2009 | (Japan) Atsushi Watanabe | BHI 17 | BHI 21 | OUL 14 | OUL 12 | DON 19 | DON Ret | THR 14 | THR Ret | SNE 18 | SNE 16 | KNO 14 | KNO 15 | MAL 14 | MAL 19 | | BHGP 17 | BHGP 15 | BHGP 19 | CAD 20 | CAD 16 | | CRO 18 | CRO 21 | SIL 19 | SIL Ret | | | | 27th | 14 | |
| 2009 | (Northern Ireland) Alastair Seeley | BHI | BHI | OUL | OUL | DON | DON | THR | THR | SNE | SNE | KNO | KNO | MAL | MAL | | BHGP | BHGP | BHGP | CAD | CAD | | CRO | CRO | SIL; Ret | SIL; 10 | OUL; Ret | OUL; 13 | OUL; DNS | 32nd | 9 | |
| 2010 | (Northern Ireland) Michael Laverty | BHI; Ret | BHI; 4 | THR; 10 | THR; 6 | OUL; 5 | OUL; 1 | CAD; 2 | CAD; 3 | MAL; 3 | MAL; 3 | KNO; 4 | KNO; C | SNE; 6 | SNE; 5 | SNE; 3 | BHGP; 6 | BHGP; 4 | BHGP; Ret | CAD; 4 | CAD; 4 | | CRO; 2 | CRO; 1 | SIL; 3 | SIL; Ret | OUL; 4 | OUL; 8 | OUL; 4 | 4th | 604 | |
| 2010 | (Northern Ireland) Alastair Seeley | BHI; 4 | BHI; 3 | THR; 12 | THR; 9 | OUL; 4 | OUL; 6 | CAD; 9 | CAD; 7 | MAL; 10 | MAL; 11 | KNO; 5 | KNO; C | SNE; 5 | SNE; 3 | SNE; Ret | BHGP; 1 | BHGP; Ret | BHGP; Ret | CAD; 8 | CAD; 9 | | CRO; Ret | CRO; 15 | SIL; 6 | SIL; 4 | OUL; 15 | OUL; 5 | OUL; 7 | 6th | 550 | |
| 2011 | (Australia) Josh Brookes | BHI; Ret | BHI; DNS | OUL; 6 | OUL; Ret | CRO; 8 | CRO; 4 | THR; 9 | THR; 6 | KNO; 5 | KNO; 13 | SNE; 7 | SNE; 2 | OUL; 2 | OUL; C | | BHGP; 1 | BHGP; 6 | BHGP; Ret | CAD; DSQ | CAD; 4 | CAD; 2 | DON; 6 | DON; 5 | SIL; 4 | SIL; 1 | BHGP; 2 | BHGP; Ret | BHGP; 6 | 5th | 598 | |
