= 2015 North West 200 Races =

(United Kingdom) 2015 North West 200 Races
Race details
Date	11-16 May 2015
Location	Northern Ireland
Course	Road Course; 8.970 mi (14.436 km)

2015 International North West 200 was the 76th running of the motorcycle road racing event which took place between 11–16 May 2015 at the circuit, known as "The Triangle", based around the towns of Portstewart, Coleraine and Portrush, in Northern Ireland.

== Results ==
=== Race results ===
==== Race 1; 600cc Supersport Race 1 final standings ====
Thursday 14 May 2015 6 laps – 53.656 miles

Rank	Rider	Team	Time	Speed
1	(Northern Ireland) Alastair Seeley	Suzuki 600cc	27' 43.982	116.136 mph
2	(Northern Ireland) Michael Dunlop	Yamaha 600cc	+ 7.583	115.609 mph
3	(Northern Ireland) Lee Johnston	Triumph 650cc	+ 14.766	115.114 mph
4	(New Zealand) Bruce Anstey	Honda 600cc	+ 26.356	114.325 mph
5	(England) Dean Harrison	Yamaha 600cc	+ 26.356	114.325 mph
6	(Isle of Man) Conor Cummins	Honda 600cc	+ 34.325	113.789 mph
7	(Scotland) Keith Amor	Honda 600cc	+ 34.961	113.746 mph
8	(England) James Hillier	Kawasaki 600cc	+ 41.349	113.320 mph
9	(Northern Ireland) Jamie Hamilton	Honda 600cc	+ 41.519	113.309 mph
10	(England) John McGuinness	Honda 600cc	+ 43.902	113.151 mph

Fastest Lap: Alastair Seeley – Suzuki, 4 minutes, 35.818 seconds; 117.077 mph (188.417 km/h) on lap 5

==== Race 2; 650cc Super-Twins Race final standings ====
Thursday 14 May 2015 4 laps – 35.724 miles

Rank	Rider	Team	Time	Speed
1	(Northern Ireland) Ryan Farquhar	Kawasaki 650cc	19' 59.741	107.243 mph
2	(Northern Ireland) Jeremy McWilliams	Kawasaki 650cc	+ 1.268	107.130 mph
3	(Northern Ireland) Jamie Hamilton	Kawasaki 650cc	+ 9.851	106.370 mph
4	(Italy) Christian Elkin	Kawasaki 650cc	+ 30.011	104.626 mph
5	(Republic of Ireland) Derek McGee	Kawasaki 650 cc	+ 32.365	104.426 mph
6	(Republic of Ireland) Michael Sweeney	Kawasaki 650cc	+ 35.160	104.190 mph
7	(England) Martin Jessopp	Kawasaki 650cc	+ 1' 07.974	101.493 mph
8	(England) Jamie Coward	Aprilia 550cc	+ 1' 10.842	101.264 mph
9	(United Kingdom) Darren James	Kawasaki 650cc	+ 1' 11.494	101.212 mph
10	(United Kingdom) Ian Morrell	Kawasaki 600cc	+ 1' 12.146	101.160 mph

Fastest Lap: Ryan Farquhar – Kawasaki, 4 minutes, 59.172 seconds; 107.938 mph (173.709 km/h) on lap 4

==== Race 3; 600cc Supersport Race 2 final standings ====
Saturday 16 May 2015 6 laps – 53.656 miles

Rank	Rider	Team	Time	Speed
1	(Northern Ireland) Alastair Seeley	Suzuki 600cc	27' 53.011	115.509 mph
2	(England) Glen Irwin	Kawasaki 600cc	+ 2.567	115.332 mph
3	(Northern Ireland) Lee Johnston	Triumph 650cc	+ 10.649	114.779 mph
4	(Northern Ireland) William Dunlop	Yamaha 600cc	+ 14.027	114.549 mph
5	(Scotland) Keith Amor	Honda 600cc	+ 34.944	113.146 mph
6	(England) Dean Harrison	Yamaha 600cc	+ 35.323	113.121 mph
7	(England) John McGuinness	Honda 600cc	+ 36.940	113.014 mph
8	(England) James Hillier	Kawasaki 600cc	+ 48.244	113.272 mph
9	(England) Ben Wilson	Kawasaki 600cc	+ 51.750	112.043 mph
10	(England) Michael Rutter	Kawasaki 600cc	+ 52.667	111.984 mph

Fastest Lap: Alastair Seeley – Suzuki, 4 minutes, 36.197 seconds; 116.917 mph (188.160 km/h) on lap 6

==== Race 4; 1000cc Superbike Race final standings ====
Saturday 16 May 2015 5 laps – 53.656 miles

Rank	Rider	Team	Time	Speed
1	(Northern Ireland) Alastair Seeley	BMW 1000cc	22' 15.677	120.505 mph
2	(England) Ian Hutchinson	Kawasaki 1000cc	+ 0.305	120.478 mph
3	(New Zealand) Bruce Anstey	Honda 1000cc	+ 0.543	120.456 mph
4	(Northern Ireland) Lee Johnston	BMW 1000cc	+ 1.921	120.332 mph
5	(England) Michael Rutter	BMW 1000 cc	+ 3.523	120.188 mph
6	(England) John McGuinness	Honda 1000cc	+ 4.967	120.059 mph
7	(England) William Dunlop	BMW 1000cc	+ 11.790	119.451 mph
8	(England) Guy Martin	BMW 1000cc	+ 14.307	119.228 mph
9	(Australia) David Johnston	BMW 1000cc	+ 44.522	116.618 mph
10	(Scotland) Keith Amor	BMW 1000cc	+ 59.415	115.373 mph

Fastest Lap: Alastair Seeley – BMW, 4 minutes, 24.760 seconds; 121.967 mph (196.287 km/h) on lap 5

== See also ==
- North West 200 – History and results from the event
