= 2000 Isle of Man TT =

Motorcycle race event in 2000

Isle of Man TT Mountain Course

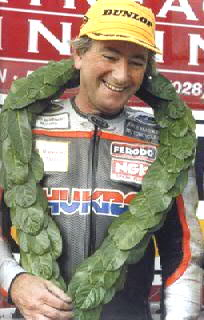
Joey Dunlop (pictured in 1999) took his final three TT victories.

The 2000 Isle of Man TT was a motorcycle race event. The Isle of Man TT (Tourist Trophy) Races are held annually in the Isle of Man. The 2000 races were dominated by David Jefferies and Joey Dunlop, who gained a hat-trick of wins each. They included Dunlop's 26th and final win at the TT in the Ultra-lightweight 125cc race, and he also proved he could still win a 'big bike' race, winning the Formula One TT in the opening race. Dunlop died several weeks later in a racing accident in Tallinn, Estonia.

The event was Michael Rutter's last TT until his return in 2007.

Rob Fisher won both sidecar races bringing his total up to eight wins.

== Results ==
- Race 1 – TT Formula One Race (6 laps – 226.38 miles)

Rank	Rider	Machine	Time	Speed
1	(Northern Ireland) Joey Dunlop	Honda	1 52 15.3	120.99
2	(England) Michael Rutter	Yamaha	1.53.14.9	119.93
3	(England) John McGuinness	Honda	1.53.38.0	119.53
4	(Wales) Ian Lougher	Yamaha	1.54.22.8	118.75
5	(Scotland) Jim Moodie	Honda	1.55.08.6	117.95
6	(Isle of Man) Jason Griffiths	Yamaha	1.55.44.1	117.36

- Race 2 – Sidecar Race A (3 laps – 113.19miles)

Rank	Rider	Passenger	Machine	Time	Speed
1	(England) Rob Fisher	Rick Long	Baker Honda	1 01 46.3	109.94
2	(England) Gary Horspole	Kevin Leigh	Honda	1.02.53.6	107.98
3	(England) Steve Norbury	Andrew Smith	Shelbourne Lockyam	1.03.32.8	106.87
4	(England) Roy Hanks	Dave Wells	Molyneux Yamaha	1.03.56.0	106.22
5	(England) Ben Dixon	Mark Lambert	Shelbourne	1.04.00.6	106.09
6	(England) Tony Baker	Scott Parnell	Baker Yamaha	1.05.13.9	104.11

- Race 3a – Lightweight 250 TT Race (3 laps – 113.19 miles)

Rank	Rider	Machine	Time	Speed
1	(Northern Ireland) Joey Dunlop	Honda	58 32.2	116.01
2	(New Zealand) Bruce Anstey	Yamaha	59.39.4	113.84
3	(Wales) Ian Lougher	Honda	59.48.5	113.55
4	(New Zealand) Shaun Harris	Honda	1.00.00.8	113.16
5	(Isle of Man) Jason Griffiths	Yamaha	1.00.12.0	112.81
6	(Isle of Man) Richard Quayle	Honda	1.00.15.1	112.71

- Race 3b – Lightweight 400 TT Race (3 laps – 113.19 miles)

Held simultaneously with the Lightweight 250 TT. Geoff McMullan finished in first position, but was later disqualified and excluded from the rest of the event for having an oversized engine.

Rank	Rider	Machine	Time	Speed
1	(New Zealand) Brett Richmond	Honda	1 05 17.9	104.00
2	(Northern Ireland) Brian Gardiner	Kawasaki	1.05.49.7	103.16
3	(England) Robert J Price	Yamaha	1.06.18.7	102.41
4	(England) Jon Vincent	Kawasaki	1.06.18.9	102.41
5	(Isle of Man) Johnny Barton	Yamaha	1.06.37.9	101.92
6	(New Zealand) Paul Dobbs	Kawasaki	1.08.25.3	99.25

- Race 4 – Sidecar Race B (3 laps – 113.19 miles)

Rank	Rider	Passenger	Machine	Time	Speed
1	(England) Rob Fisher	Rick Long	Baker Honda	1 02 52.2	108.02
2	(England) Steve Norbury	Andrew Smith	Shelbourne Lockyam	1.03.56.1	106.22
3	(England) Geoff Bell	Craig Hallam	Windle Yamaha	1.04.11.8	105.79
4	(England) Gary Horspole	Kevin Leigh	Honda	1.04.30.2	105.28
5	(England) Allan Schofield	Ian Simons	Baker Honda	1.04.51.2	104.71
6	(England) Mick Harvey	Stephen Thomas	Shelbourne Yamaha	1.05.22.5	103.88

- Race 5 – Ultra Lightweight 125 TT (4 laps – 150.92 miles)

Rank	Rider	Machine	Time	Speed
1	(Northern Ireland) Joey Dunlop	Honda	1 24 30.8	107.14
2	(Northern Ireland) Denis McCullough	Honda	1.24.46.9	106.80
3	(Northern Ireland) Robert Dunlop	Honda	1.25.08.0	106.36
4	(Northern Ireland) Gary Dynes	Honda	1.25.18.5	106.14
5	(Northern Ireland) Darran Lindsay	Honda	1.25.26.7	105.97
6	(Wales) Ian Lougher	Honda	1.25.58.4	105.32

- Race 6 – Singles TT (4 laps – 150.92 miles)

Rank	Rider	Machine	Time	Speed
1	(England) John McGuinness	Chrysalis BMW	1 22 35.7	109.63
2	(Isle of Man) Jason Griffiths	Chrysalis BMW	1.23.23.2	108.59
3	(Isle of Man) Johnny Barton	Ducati	1.24.09.4	107.59
4	(England) Robert A Price	Yamaha	1.27.54.1	103.01
5	Edward Poole	Bimota	1.33.45.5	96.58
6	Philip Shaw	Suzuki	1.35.10.9	95.13

- Race 7 – Junior TT 600cc (4 laps – 150.92 miles)

Rank	Rider	Machine	Time	Speed
1	(England) David Jefferies	Yamaha	1 15 52.8	119.33
2	(Northern Ireland) Adrian Archibald	Honda	1.16.01.5	119.10
3	(Wales) Ian Lougher	Yamaha	1.16.20.6	118.61
4	(Northern Ireland) Joey Dunlop	Honda	1.16.26.7	118.45
5	(England) Michael Rutter	Yamaha	1.16.32.8	118.29
6	(Scotland) Jim Moodie	Honda	1.16.55.6	117.71

- Race 8 – Production TT

Rank	Rider	Machine	Time	Speed
1	(England) David Jefferies	Yamaha	45 55.6	98.58
2	(Isle of Man) Richard Quayle	Honda	46.48.3	96.73
3	(England) Michael Rutter	Yamaha	46.52.7	96.58
4	(Northern Ireland) Richard Britton	Yamaha	47.04.4	96.18
5	(Scotland) Iain Duffus	Honda	47.20.6	95.53
6	(Northern Ireland) Adrian Archibald	Honda	47.30.5	95.30

- Race 9 – Senior TT Race (6 laps – 226.38 miles)

Rank	Rider	Machine	Time	Speed
1	(England) David Jefferies	Yamaha	1 51 22.8	121.95
2	(England) Michael Rutter	Yamaha	1.52.03.5	121.21
3	(Northern Ireland) Joey Dunlop	Honda	1.52.33.8	120.66
4	(England) John McGuinness	Honda	1.53.52.6	119.27
5	(Northern Ireland) Adrian Archibald	Honda	1.54.14.4	118.89
6	(Isle of Man) Jason Griffiths	Yamaha	1.54.41.7	118.42
