= Richard Britton (motorcyclist) =

Irish motorcycle racer (1970 – 2005)

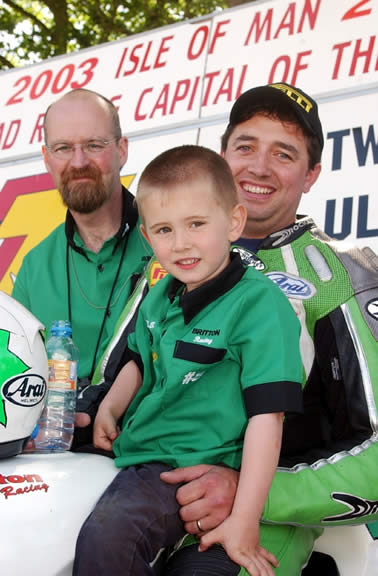
- Richard Britton with son Loris and Mechanic Davy Lappin on the Isle of Man TT 400 podium in 2003
- Nationality: Irish
- Born: 24 April 1970
- Died: 18 September 2005 (aged 35); Ballybunion road races
Motorcycle racing career statistics
Isle of Man TT career
TTs contested	7 (1998–2000, 2002–2005)
TT wins	0
TT podiums	2

Richard Britton (24 April 1970 – 18 September 2005) was one of Ireland's leading motorcycle road racers, as well as a team manager. He won the Regal 600 Championship four times and was the fastest Irishman to lap the Isle of Man TT circuit. After his death at the Ballybunion road races, he was honoured as Irish Motorcyclist of the Year.

== Career ==
Britton's racing career began in the 1994 Irish Clubman series, which saw him win the 400cc class. In 1998, he moved to race on pure road circuits where he was sponsored by Alan Gregg of the Schimmell race team. At the end of that year, he won the first of his four Regal 600 Championships but an accident at the 1999 season-opening Cookstown 100 saw him sidelined for most of the season with a broken arm.

In 2000, Britton was taken under the wing of new sponsor PJ O'Kane and was drafted into the O'Kane racing team, after parting ways with Schimmell Racing at the Isle of Man TT. In the next two seasons, he won both of the Regal 600 championships. With new machinery for 2002, and for the first time in Irish history, Britton won his fourth, (and his third successive) Regal 600 Championship. 2002 also saw Britton become the fastest Irishman ever to lap the TT Circuit.

In 2003, Patsy O'Kane withdrew from the sport but allowed Britton to keep the bike that he had campaigned his 2002 season on. He was also supplied with a Kawasaki ZX-6R by Nick Morgan of MSS Kawasaki. Britton was crowned Irish 600 Road Race Champion (the last year of the Regal Championship) at the Dundalk Road Races, Darver, County Louth, at the end of 2003.

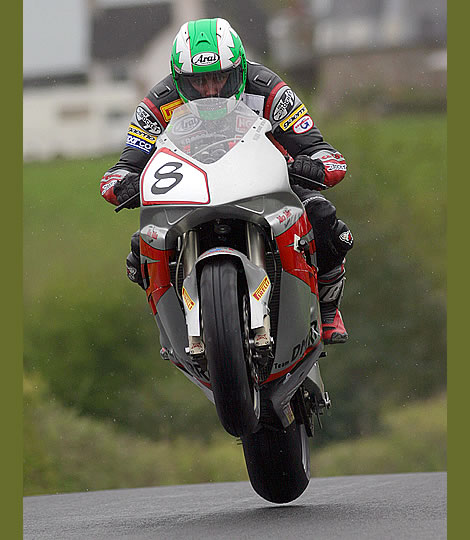
Richard Britton on the DMRR Honda at the 2005 Cookstown 100

In 2004, Britton ran a team himself, acquiring sponsorship locally and through friends and family. Despite a lack of factory support, he still had a successful season, with race wins at a number of national road races. He also rode for British Superbike team Rizla Suzuki in a one-off ride at the North West 200.

For 2005, Britton moved to the DMRR racing team, who had previously supplied him with a Supersport machine for the 2004 season. Although showing promise all season, a series of mechanical failures left him with little to show for the year, and he left the team mid-season, joining friend Martin Finnegan at the Vitrans Honda squad for the Ulster Grand Prix.

Britton died on 18 September 2005 in a freak accident at a new Irish national road race at Ballybunion, County Kerry, when the engine on his 250 machine seized. He was travelling at a reduced speed, around 30 to 35 mph, and landed against a stone wall at an awkward angle. Britton was posthumously awarded the title Irish Motorcyclist of the Year, the highest honour in Irish motorcycling, on 6 November 2005.

== Personal life ==
Britton was married to Maria and had one son, Loris, named after the MotoGP star Loris Capirossi.
