= David Jefferies =

English motorcycle racer (1972–2003)

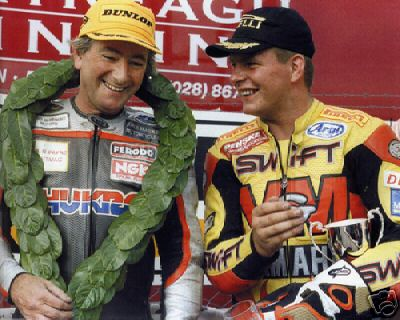
- Jefferies (r) with Joey Dunlop at the 1999 Ulster GP
- Nationality: British
- Born: 18 September 1972; Shipley, West Yorkshire, England
- Died: 29 May 2003 (aged 30); Crosby, Isle of Man
Motorcycle racing career statistics
Isle of Man TT career
TTs contested	6 (1996, 1998–2000, 2002–03)
TT wins	9
First TT win	1999 Formula One TT
Last TT win	2002 Senior TT
TT podiums	10

Allan David Jefferies (18 September 1972 – 29 May 2003) was an English professional motorcycle racer. He died after crashing during practice for the 2003 Isle of Man TT races.

== Early life ==
The son of Tony Jefferies, also a former TT race winner in 1971, David Jefferies was born in Shipley, West Yorkshire, England. His uncle was fellow TT winner Nick Jefferies. Jefferies attended Salt Grammar School.

== Career ==
Jefferies competed in a range of racing classes including the Grand Prix world championship in 1993, and the World Superbike Championship in 1993 and 1995. He was the British Superstock 1000 champion twice in the previous three years.

Jefferies specialized in street circuits, such as the Isle of Man TT and the North West 200, where he was a four-time winner. At the Isle of Man TT, Jefferies was the first rider to lap in excess of 125 miles per hour (201 km/h) and the first to win three races during the week-long festival for three consecutive years. He also set the absolute lap record for the Isle of Man TT course during the 2002 Senior TT at 17min 47sec, an average speed of 127.29 miles per hour (204.85 km/h).

== Death ==
Jefferies died on Thursday, May 29, 2003, during practice week for the 2003 Isle of Man TT. The turn at Crosby is a shallow left-hand turn taken at speeds of around 160 mph; on the outside of the turn there are stone walls at the front of gardens. Jefferies approached the turn on his TAS Racing GSX-R1000, following a lap of 125 mph average speed (the fastest in that practice week). Jefferies reportedly hit the wall of number 29 Woodlea Villas bordering the turn before he and his machine were hurled back across the circuit, taking lumps of debris across the road and bringing down a telephone pole in the process. Jefferies was killed instantly upon impact with the wall. In the aftermath of the crash, fellow rider Jim Moodie did not have enough time to brake when he reached the scene and rode into the telegraph lines which were hanging across the road due to the incident; three of the lines snapped; however, one came over his motorcycle's windscreen and nearly killed him when it wrapped round his throat; it snapped at the last minute and Moodie escaped with his life; however, he retired from TT competition shortly afterwards. A friend and fellow TT competitor, John McGuinness, who was the first rider to reach the scene, described it as looking 'Like a war zone'.

Later that day, the TT organisers released an official statement which read: 'It is with regret that the organizers of the Isle of Man TT races, the Auto-Cycle Union, announce that David Jefferies, of Baildon in West Yorkshire, who crashed on the second lap of this afternoon's practice session, received injuries, which proved fatal. Thirty-year-old Jefferies was involved in an accident at Crosby. The red flag was displayed at the Grandstand and all riders finishing their first lap were brought back into the paddock. Those who had already embarked on their second lap were Halted at Glen Vine. Jefferies was the outright lap record holder at the TT and had lapped at 125 mph on his first lap today riding his Temple Auto Salvage GSX-R Suzuki. The organisers have instituted an immediate inquiry into the details of the incident.' The inquiry would become an extremely controversial affair; organizers insisted that marshals had carried out the correct duties during the incident while riders protested saying that not enough flags were shown and the manner in which those that were shown did not imply the seriousness of the situation at hand.

The parade lap in honour of Jefferies took place at the end of the TT weekend. Thousands of bikes took part, filling the 37-mile course.

== Grand Prix career statistics ==
Points system from 1993 onwards:

**Position**	1	2	3	4	5	6	7	8	9	10	11	12	13	14	15
**Points**	25	20	16	13	11	10	9	8	7	6	5	4	3	2	1

(key) (Races in bold indicate pole position; races in italics indicate fastest lap)

Year	Class	Team	Machine	1	2	3	4	5	6	7	8	9	10	11	12	13	14	Points	Rank	Wins
1993	500cc	Peter Graves Racing-Yamaha	Harris-YZR500	AUS -	MAL -	JPN -	ESP -	AUT -	GER -	NED -	EUR -	RSM; 17	GBR; 20	CZE; 19	ITA; 22	USA; 16	FIM; 18	0	-	0

== Bibliography ==
- Barker, Stuart (2009). David Jefferies: The Official Biography. Sparkford, Yeovil, Somerset: Haynes Publishing. ISBN 978-1844256631.

Sporting positions
Preceded by Michael Rutter	Macau Motorcycle Grand Prix Winner; 1999	Succeeded by Michael Rutter
