= 2002 Isle of Man TT =

Annual motorcycle racing event

Isle of Man TT Mountain Course

The 2002 Isle of Man TT saw David Jefferies win 3 races, while Bruce Anstey took his first win, and current race official Richard "Milky" Quayle took his first and only TT win during the Lightweight 400cc race.

The event was marred by the death of Colin Daniels during practice.

== Results ==
=== Race 1 – Duke TT Formula One Race ===
Rank	Rider	Bike	Time	Speed (mph)
1	(England) David Jefferies	Suzuki	1 50 05.1	123.38
2	(England) John McGuinness	Honda	1 50 41.6	122.70
3	(Scotland) Jim Moodie	Yamaha	1 51 09.6	122.19
4	(Wales) Ian Lougher	Suzuki	1 51 14.8	122.09
5	(Isle of Man) Richard Quayle	Suzuki	1 53 05.6	120.10
6	(Isle of Man) Jason Griffiths	Yamaha	1 54 02.2	119.10

=== Race 2 - Lightweight 400cc ===
Rank	Rider	Bike	Time	Speed (mph)
1	(Isle of Man) Richard Quayle	Honda	1 22 52.0	109.27
2	(England) Jim Hodson	Yamaha	1 23 14.1	108.79
3	(Northern Ireland) Richard Britton	Kawasaki	1 23 33.8	108.36
4	(Isle of Man) Nigel Davies	Honda	1 24 27.2	107.22
5	(Isle of Man) Dave Madsen-Mygdal	Honda	1 24 38.7	106.97
6	(Isle of Man) Johnny Barton	Yamaha	1 24 51.0	106.72

=== Race 3 - IOMSPC Junior 600cc/250cc ===
Rank	Rider	Bike	Time	Speed (mph)
1	(Scotland) Jim Moodie	Yamaha	1 15 56.9	119.22
2	(Wales) Ian Lougher	Suzuki	1 16 30.3	118.36
3	(Isle of Man) Jason Griffiths	Yamaha	1 17 08.2	117.39
4	(Northern Ireland) Richard Britton	Suzuki	1 17 22.4	117.03
5	(Northern Ireland) Ryan Farquhar	Kawasaki	1 17 24.7	116.97
6	(Isle of Man) Richard Quayle	Honda	1 17 30.6	116.82

=== Race 4 - Production 600 ===
Rank	Rider	Bike	Time	Speed (mph)
1	(Wales) Ian Lougher	Suzuki	57 08.4	118.85
2	(New Zealand) Bruce Anstey	Suzuki	57 36.9	117.87
3	(Scotland) Jim Moodie	Yamaha	57 55.4	117.24
4	(New Zealand) Shaun Harris	Suzuki	58 08.6	116.8 0
5	(Northern Ireland) Adrian Archibald	Honda	58 28.1	116.15
6	(Northern Ireland) Richard Britton	Suzuki	58 35.2	115.92

=== Race 5 - Ultralightweight 125cc ===
Rank	Rider	Bike	Time	Speed (mph)
1	(Wales) Ian Lougher	Honda	1 23 20.4	108.65
2	(England) James Crumpton	Honda	1 23 40.7	108.21
3	(Northern Ireland) Robert Dunlop	Honda	1 24 35.7	107.04
4	(England) Chris Palmer	Honda	1 25 42.2	105.65
5	(England) Garry Bennett	Honda	1 26 44.8	104.38
6	(England) Alan Jackson	Honda	1 29 32.3	101.13

=== Race 6 - IOM Steam Pckt 250cc ===
Rank	Rider	Bike	Time	Speed (mph)
1	(New Zealand) Bruce Anstey	Yamaha	1 18 31.1	115.32
2	(England) Simon Smith	Honda	1 21 34.7	111.00
3	(England) Roy Richardson	Honda	1 22 18.5	110.01
4	Richard Coates	Honda	1 23 11.6	108.84
5	Keith Shannon	Honda	1 24 57.3	106.58
6	(Germany) Henrik Voit	Honda	1 25 13.1	106.25

=== Race 7 - Hilton Hotel Sidecar Race A ===
Rank	Rider	Passenger	Bike	Time	Speed (mph)
1	(England) Rob Fisher	Rick Long	LMS	1.01.25.9	110.55
2	(England) Ian Bell	Neil Carpenter	DMR Yamaha	1.01.46.0	109.95
3	(England) Gary Horspole	Kevin Leigh	Shelbourne Honda	1.02.06.6	109.34
4	(Isle of Man) Dave Molyneux	Colin Hardman	DMR HONDA	1.02.17.1	109.03
5	(England) Roy Hanks	Dave Wells	Yamaha	1.02.57.5	107.87
6	(England) Ben Dixon	Mark Lambert	Shelbourne Honda	1.03.05.3	107.64

=== Race 8 - Scottish Life Intl. Production 1000 ===
Rank	Rider	Bike	Time	Speed (mph)
1	(England) David Jefferies	Suzuki	55 22.5	122.64
2	(Wales) Ian Lougher	Suzuki	55 38.0	122.07
3	(New Zealand) Bruce Anstey	Suzuki	56 05.2	121.08
4	(Scotland) Jim Moodie	Yamaha	56 33.4	120.08
5	(Scotland) Iain Duffus	Suzuki	56 43.0	119.74
6	(England) John McGuinness	Honda	56 55.8	119.29

=== Race 9 - Hilton Hotel Sidecar Race B ===
Rank	Rider	Passenger	Bike	Time	Speed (mph)
1	(England) Rob Fisher	Rick Long	LMS	1.01.19.0	110.75
2	(Isle of Man) Dave Molyneux	Colin Hardman	DMR Honda	1.01.33.2	110.33
3	(England) Ian Bell	Neil Carpenter	DMR Yamaha	1.01.49.7	109.84
4	(England) Roy Hanks	Dave Wells	Yamaha	1.02.37.3	108.45
5	(England) Gary Horspole	Kevin Leigh	Shelbourne Honda	1.02.45.5	108.21
6	(England) Philip Dongworth	Stuart Castles	Ireson Kawasaki	1.03.20.4	107.22

=== Race 10 – Standard Bank Offshore Senior TT Race ===
Rank	Rider	Team	Time	Speed (mph)
1	(England) David Jefferies	Suzuki	1 48 53.1	124.74
2	(Wales) Ian Lougher	Suzuki	1 49 15.2	124.32
3	(England) John McGuinness	Honda	1 50 01.3	123.45
4	(Isle of Man) Richard Quayle	Suzuki	1 51 18.6	122.02
5	(Northern Ireland) Richard Britton	Suzuki	1 51 30.7	121.80
6	(Northern Ireland) Adrian Archibald	Honda	1 52 19.1	120.93
