= 1998 Isle of Man TT =

Annual motorcycle racing event

Isle of Man TT Mountain Course

The 1998 Isle of Man TT was the 92nd edition of the event. Due to the high amount of rainy days, the Sidecar Race A was cancelled. It was only the second time a race was cancelled in the history of the event. The TT Formula One was also postponed by a day.

Ian Simpson was the only rider to win multiple races, taking the opening and closing races, the Formula One TT and the Senior TT. It was Simpson's last participation at the TT as leg injuries prevented him from competing in 1999, before forcing him into early retirement in early 2001.

Three competitors died during the event, Mike Casey, Ian Hardisty and John Henderson. A fourth rider, 66-year old Jack Trustham, died of a heart attack during a parade lap commemorating Honda's achievements on the island.

== Results ==
=== Formula One TT ===
| Rank | Rider | Machine | Time | Speed (mph) |
|---|---|---|---|---|
| 1 | (Scotland) Ian Simpson | Honda | 1.16.15.6 | 118.74 |
| 2 | (England) Michael Rutter | Honda | 1.16.17.8 | 118.68 |
| 3 | (Northern Ireland) James Courtney | Honda | 1.16.36.5 | 118.2 |
| 4 | (England) Simon Beck | Kawasaki | 1.16.51.3 | 117.82 |
| 5 | (Isle of Man) Jason Griffiths | Honda | 1.17.43.5 | 116.5 |
| 6 | (England) Dave Morris | Chrysalis AMDM | 1.20.14.1 | 112.85 |

=== Lightweight TT ===
| Rank | Rider | Machine | Time | Speed (mph) |
|---|---|---|---|---|
| 1 | (Northern Ireland) Joey Dunlop | Honda | 46.51.8 | 96.61 |
| 2 | (England) Bob Jackson | Yamaha | 47.34.7 | 95.16 |
| 3 | (England) John McGuinness | Yamaha | 47.48.6 | 94.69 |
| 4 | (Northern Ireland) James Courtney | Honda | 48.08.0 | 94.06 |
| 5 | (Isle of Man) Jason Griffiths | Honda | 48.32.4 | 93.27 |
| 6 | (England) Gavin Lee | Yamaha | 48.40.6 | 93.01 |

=== Sidecar Race B ===
| Rank | Rider | Passenger | Machine | Time | Speed (mph) |
|---|---|---|---|---|---|
| 1 | (Isle of Man) Dave Molyneux | Doug Jewell | Bullock DMR Honda | 1.03.45.1 | 106.52 |
| 2 | (England) Kenny Howles | Nick Crowe | Ireson Yamaha | 1.05.04.4 | 104.36 |
| 3 | (England) Gary Horspole | Kevin Leigh | Shellbourne Honda | 1.05.12.3 | 104.15 |
| 4 | (England) Roy Hanks | Phillip Biggs | Rose/Molyneux Yamaha | 1.05.13.8 | 104.11 |
| 5 | (England) John Holden | Ian Watson | DMR Yamaha | 1.05.15.7 | 104.06 |
| 6 | (England) Mick Boddice Jnr | Ian Simons | Windle Honda | 1.06.24.1 | 102.27 |

=== Ultra Lightweight TT ===
| Rank | Rider | Machine | Time | Speed (mph) |
|---|---|---|---|---|
| 1 | (Northern Ireland) Robert Dunlop | Honda | 1.03.50.3 | 106.38 |
| 2 | (Wales) Ian Lougher | Honda | 1.04.08.2 | 105.88 |
| 3 | (Northern Ireland) Owen McNally | Honda | 1.04.30.1 | 105.29 |
| 4 | Gary Long | Honda | 1.04.38.0 | 105.07 |
| 5 | (Northern Ireland) Gary Dynes | Honda | 1.05.08.6 | 104.25 |
| 6 | Garry Bennett | Honda | 1.05.18.6 | 103.98 |

=== Singles TT ===
| Rank | Rider | Machine | Time | Speed (mph) |
|---|---|---|---|---|
| 1 | (England) Dave Morris | Chrysalis BMW | 1.03.11.2 | 107.48 |
| 2 | (Scotland) Jim Moodie | Sanyo Honda | 1.03.30.4 | 106.93 |
| 3 | Mick Jeffreys | Spondon Rotax | 1.08.09.2 | 99.64 |
| 4 | (England) Robert A Price | Kawasaki | 1.08.22.8 | 99.31 |
| 5 | Terry McGinty | Harris Suzuki | 1.10.43.5 | 96.02 |
| 6 | Keith Dixon | Seeley G50 Special | 1.10.56.0 | 95.74 |

=== Junior TT ===
| Rank | Rider | Machine | Time | Speed (mph) |
|---|---|---|---|---|
| 1 | (England) Michael Rutter | Honda | 59.22.7 | 114.37 |
| 2 | (Scotland) Ian Simpson | Honda | 59.29.4 | 114.16 |
| 3 | Paul Dedman | Honda | 1.00.07.3 | 112.96 |
| 4 | (England) Bob Jackson | Honda | 1.00.08.2 | 112.93 |
| 5 | Chris Heath | Honda | 1.00.24.5 | 112.43 |
| 6 | (Scotland) Jim Moodie | Honda | 1.00.26.8 | 112.35 |

=== Production TT ===
| Rank | Rider | Machine | Time | Speed (mph) |
|---|---|---|---|---|
| 1 | (Scotland) Jim Moodie | Honda | 56.58.7 | 119.15 |
| 2 | (Wales) Nigel Davies | Kawasaki | 57.27.7 | 118.19 |
| 3 | (England) Michael Rutter | Honda | 57.29.0 | 118.14 |
| 4 | (England) David Jefferies | Yamaha | 57.45.5 | 117.58 |
| 5 | (England) Bob Jackson | Yamaha | 58.14.5 | 116.6 |
| 6 | (Isle of Man) Paul Hunt | Yamaha | 58.17.5 | 116.5 |

=== Senior TT ===
| Rank | Rider | Machine | Time | Speed (mph) |
|---|---|---|---|---|
| 1 | (Scotland) Ian Simpson | Honda | 1.53.23.1 | 119.79 |
| 2 | (England) Bob Jackson | Kawasaki | 1.53.26.8 | 119.72 |
| 3 | (Northern Ireland) James Courtney | Honda | 1.53.57.3 | 119.19 |
| 4 | (England) David Jefferies | Yamaha | 1.55.09.0 | 117.95 |
| 5 | (Isle of Man) Jason Griffiths | Honda | 1.55.35.2 | 117.51 |
| 6 | (Wales) Nigel Davies | Yamaha | 1.56.14.2 | 116.85 |
