= Cemetery Circuit =

Street racetrack in Wanganui, New Zealand

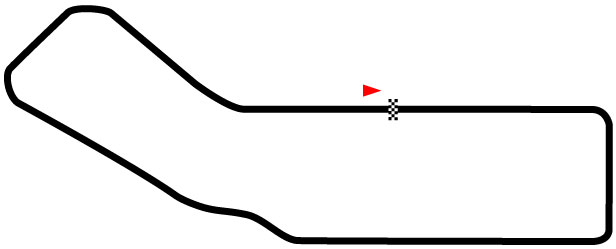
- Location: Wanganui, New Zealand
- Coordinates: 39.9392°S 175.0492°E
- Capacity: 10,000
- Opened: 1951
- Length: 1.500 km (0.932 mi)

Cemetery Circuit is a temporary motorcycle street circuit in downtown Wanganui, New Zealand, so named because the route bisects the old town cemetery. The daylong road race has traditionally been held on Boxing Day (26 December) since 1951. The event attracts around 10,000 spectators and some of the best New Zealand motorbike racers to compete on the tight one-mile street circuit. It has earned a nickname: “Southern Hemisphere’s Isle of Man”.

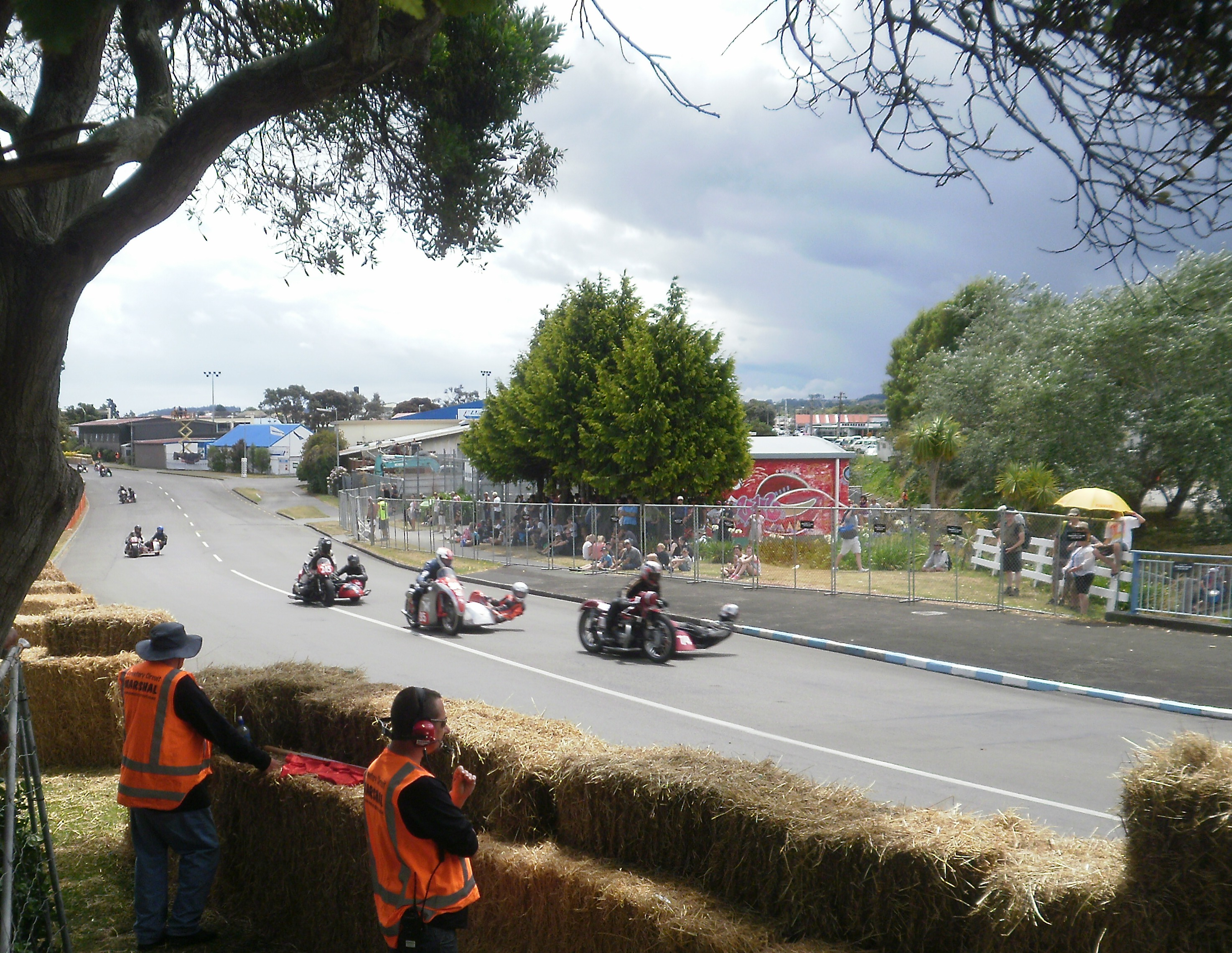
Sidecar racing at the 2012 Cemetery Circuit

== Recent winners ==
Recent winners of the race are as follows.

Year	Rider	Motorcycle	Ref
2025	(New Zealand) Mitch Rees	Honda CBR1000RR-R	
2024	(New Zealand) Mitch Rees	Honda CBR1000RR-R	
2023	(New Zealand) Mitch Rees	Honda CBR1000RR-R	
2022	(New Zealand) Mitch Rees	Honda CBR1000RR-R	
2021	not raced		
2020	(New Zealand) Damon Rees	Honda CBR1000RR	
2019	(United Kingdom) Richard Cooper	Suzuki GSXR1000	
2018	(United Kingdom) Peter Hickman	BMW S1000R	
2017	(New Zealand) Scott Moir	Suzuki GSXR1000	
2016	(New Zealand) Tony Rees	Honda CBR1000RR	
2015	(New Zealand) Tony Rees	Honda CBR1000RR	
2014	(New Zealand) Tony Rees	Honda CBR1000RR	
