= List of Isle of Man TT Mountain Course fatalities =

Racing deaths (i.e. riders only) on the Mountain Course, by year (1910–2017)

This list is of fatal crashes on the Isle of Man TT Mountain Course used for the Isle of Man TT races, Manx Grand Prix and Classic TT races. The TT Course was first used as an automobile road-racing circuit for the 1908 Tourist Trophy event for racing automobiles, then known as the Four Inch Course. For the 1911 Isle of Man TT race motor-cycle races, the event was moved from the St John's Short Course to the Four Inch Course by the UK Auto-Cycle Club, and became known as the Isle of Man TT Mountain Course, or TT Course, when used for motorcycle racing.

Victor Surridge was the first fatality on the Isle of Man TT Mountain Course, after a crash at Glen Helen during practice for the 1911 Isle of Man TT races. This was possibly the first death in the Isle of Man in a motorcycle or road vehicle crash.

The deadliest year was 2005, when 11 people died: three riders and one marshal died during the June race, and six riders and one course bystander died during the Manx Grand Prix in August/September 2005. Since 1937, the only season where the major races were held in both events and ended without a fatality in either the TT or the Manx Grand Prix was in 1982. The 2012 and 2024 TTs, which were raced by more experienced professional riders, ended without fatalities, but there were fatalities in the Manx Grand Prix, which is raced with amateur riders except for the vintage motorcycle classes that experienced professionals may participate in. The 2025 TT and Manx Grand Prix races had no fatalities, but the blue riband Senior TT and the Manx Senior Classic and Formula 1 classic events were cancelled by weather.

== Racing deaths ==
=== Motorcycles and sidecars ===
No	Country	Rider	Date	Place	Race	Event	Machine
1	England	Victor Surridge	27 June 1911	Glen Helen	1911 Isle of Man TT	Practice	Rudge-Whitworth
2	England	Frank R Bateman	6 June 1913	Creg-ny-Baa	1913 Isle of Man TT	Senior TT	499cc Rudge
3	Ireland	Fred Walker	19 May 1914	St Ninian's Crossroads	1914 Isle of Man TT	Junior TT	Royal Enfield
4	England	James H. H. Veasey	15 June 1923	Greeba Bridge	1923 Isle of Man TT	Senior TT	500cc Douglas
5	Isle of Man	Ned Brew	15 September 1923	Hillberry Corner	1923 Manx Amateur Road Races	Practice	Frera
6	England	James T. A. Temple	31 August 1925	Glentramman	1925 Manx Amateur Road Races	Practice	Norton
7	England	Archie Birkin	7 June 1927	Rhencullen	1927 Isle of Man TT	Practice	500cc McEvoy
8	England	John Cooke	15 June 1927	East Snaefell Mountain Gate	1927 Isle of Man TT	Lightweight TT	249cc DOT
9	England	Cecil Ashby	10 June 1929	Ballacraine	1929 Isle of Man TT	Junior TT	New Imperial
10	England	Doug Lamb	14 June 1929	Greeba Bridge	1929 Isle of Man TT	Senior TT	500cc Norton
11	England	Freddie Hicks	19 June 1931	Union Mills	1931 Isle of Man TT	Senior TT	AJS
12	England	Frank Longman	14 June 1933	Glentramman	1933 Isle of Man TT	Lightweight TT	Excelsior
13	England	Arthur Pilling	31 August 1933	Hillberry Corner	1933 Manx Grand Prix	Practice	Norton
14	England	Syd Crabtree	13 June 1934	Stonebreakers Hut	1934 Isle of Man TT	Lightweight TT	Excelsior
15	England	John Gilbert	3 September 1934	Sulby Bridge	1934 Manx Grand Prix	Practice	Velocette
16	England	John P. Williamson	6 September 1934	Kirk Michael	1934 Manx Grand Prix	Practice	498cc Rudge
17	England	John Angus MacDonald	17 June 1935	Union Mills	1935 Isle of Man TT	Junior TT	Norton
18	England	Doug Pirie	19 June 1935	33rd Milestone	1935 Isle of Man TT	Lightweight TT	New Imperial
19	England	Jack Moore	13 June 1938	East Mountain Gate	1938 Isle of Man TT	Junior TT	Norton
20	England	Percy Pritlove	12 September 1938	Union Mills	1938 Manx Grand Prix	Practice	Vincent HRD
21	Germany	Karl Gall	2 June 1939	Ballaugh Bridge	1939 Isle of Man TT	Practice	494cc BMW
22	England	Arthur W. F. Johns	26 August 1946	Quarry Bends	1946 Manx Grand Prix	Practice	500cc Norton
23	England	Peter M. Aitchinson	5 September 1946	33rd Milestone	1946 Manx Grand Prix	Senior	500cc Norton
24	Ireland	Benjy Russell	9 September 1947	School House Corner	1947 Manx Grand Prix	Lightweight	Moto-Guzzi
25	South Africa	Johan Erik van Tilburg	28 May 1948	Windy Corner	1948 Isle of Man TT	Practice	348 cc AJS
26	England	Thomas Bryant	3 June 1948	Hillberry Corner	1948 Isle of Man TT	Practice	Velocette
27	England	Neil ('Noel') Christmas	11 June 1948	Douglas Road Corner	1948 Isle of Man TT	Senior TT	500cc Norton
28	England	Ben Drinkwater	13 June 1949	11th Milestone	1949 Isle of Man TT	Junior TT	350cc Norton
29	England	John Makaula-White	29 May 1950	Handley's Corner	1950 Isle of Man TT	Practice	500cc Triumph
30	England	Thomas A. Westfield	30 May 1950	Keppel Gate	1950 Isle of Man TT	Practice	500cc Triumph
31	England	Alfred Bent	8 September 1950	Birkin's Bend	1950 Manx Grand Prix	Practice	Velocette
32	England	Leonard C. Bolshaw	29 May 1951	32nd Milestone	1951 Isle of Man TT	Practice – Senior Clubmans	Triumph
33	England	John P. O’Driscoll	31 May 1951	33rd Milestone	1951 Isle of Man TT	Practice	Rudge
34	England	John T. Wenman	4 June 1951	Rhencullen Hill/Bishopscourt	1951 Isle of Man TT	Junior TT	Norton
35	England	Doug L. Parris	4 June 1951	Bungalow	1951 Isle of Man TT	Junior Clubman Race	Douglas
36	England	Chris Horn	8 June 1951	Laurel Bank	1951 Isle of Man TT	Senior TT Race	Norton
37	England	John M. Crow	14 September 1951	Appledene	1951 Manx Grand Prix	Senior	Norton
38	England	Frank Fry	4 June 1952	Westwood Corner	1952 Isle of Man TT	Practice	Norton
39	England	Brian A. Jackson	2 September 1952	Brandywell Corner	1952 Manx Grand Prix	Practice	496cc Norton
40	England	Ivor K. Arber	2 September 1952	Hillberry Corner	1952 Manx Grand Prix	Practice	Norton
41	England	Kenneth R. V. James	5 September 1952	Cronk-ny-Mona/Signpost Corner	1952 Manx Grand Prix	Practice	500cc Manx Norton
42	England	Michael Richardson	11 September 1952	Bray Hill	1952 Manx Grand Prix	Senior	348cc AJS
43	England	Harry L Stephen	8 June 1953	Bishopscourt	1953 Isle of Man TT	Junior TT	Norton
44	England	Thomas W. Swarbrick	8 June 1953	13th Milestone	1953 Isle of Man TT	Junior TT	350cc AJS
45	England	Les Graham	12 June 1953	Quarterbridge Road	1953 Isle of Man TT	Senior TT	500cc MV Agusta
46	Australia	Geoffrey G. Walker	12 June 1953	Kerrowmoar	1953 Isle of Man TT	Senior TT	Norton
47	England	Raymond G. Ashford	7 June 1954	Laurel Bank	1954 Isle of Man TT	Practice	350cc BSA
48	England	Simon Sandys-Winsch	18 June 1954	Highlander	1954 Isle of Man TT	Senior TT	350cc Velocette
49	England	Ronald Butler	7 September 1954	Birkin's Bend	1954 Manx Grand Prix	Junior	350cc AJS
50	England	Eric W. Milton	3 September 1955	Birkin's Bend	1955 Manx Grand Prix	Practice	499cc BSA
51	Scotland	James Watson Davie	6 September 1955	Gooseneck	1955 Manx Grand Prix	Junior	AJS
52	England	David Merridan	11 June 1956	Ballaugh Bridge	1956 Isle of Man TT	Practice	499cc BSA Gold Star
53	Wales	Peter G. Kirkham	14 June 1956	Waterworks	1956 Isle of Man TT	Junior Clubmans	350cc BSA
54	England	Maurice W. Saluz	31 August 1956	Sulby Bridge	1956 Manx Grand Prix	Practice	500cc Norton
55	England	Charles F. Salt	7 June 1957	Gorse Lea	1957 Isle of Man TT	Senior TT	BSA
56	New Zealand	John F. Antram	26 May 1958	Cruickshank's Corner	1958 Isle of Man TT	Practice	AJS
57	Southern Rhodesia	Desmond D. Woolf	6 June 1958	Cronk Villa Cottage/Barregarrow	1958 Isle of Man TT	Senior TT	498cc Norton
58	England	Maurice Wassell	5 September 1958	32nd Milestone	1958 Manx Grand Prix	Practice	350cc AJS
59	England	John Hutchinson	8 September 1958	32nd Milestone	1958 Manx Grand Prix	Snaefell Race	350cc BSA
60	England	James E. Coates	5 September 1959	33rd Milestone	1959 Manx Grand Prix	Practice	AJS
61	England	John D. Hamilton	10 September 1959	33rd Milestone	1959 Manx Grand Prix	Senior	500cc Norton
62	England	John T. Sapsford	8 September 1960	Westwood Corner	1960 Manx Grand Prix	Senior	500cc BSA
63	England	Michael T. Brookes	10 June 1961	Glentramman	1961 Isle of Man TT	Practice	499cc Norton
64	Switzerland	Marie Lambert	12 June 1961	Gob-ny-Geay	1961 Isle of Man TT	Sidecar TT (Passenger)	BMW
65	England	Ralph Rensen	16 June 1961	11th Milestone	1961 Isle of Man TT	Senior TT	Norton
66	England	Geoffrey J. Griffin	31 August 1961	Glencrutchery Road	1961 Manx Grand Prix	Practice	500cc G50 Matchless
67	England	Fred Neville	5 September 1961	Appledene	1961 Manx Grand Prix	Junior	350cc AJS
68	Australia	Tom Phillis	6 June 1962	Laurel Bank	1962 Isle of Man TT	Junior TT	285cc Honda
69	New Zealand	Colin Meehan	6 June 1962	Union Mills	1962 Isle of Man TT	Junior TT	349cc AJS
70	England	Tom Pratt	4 September 1962	Appledene	1962 Manx Grand Prix	Junior	348cc Norton
71	England	Charles E. Robinson	4 September 1962	Bishopscourt	1962 Manx Grand Prix	Junior	305cc Honda
72	England	Geofrey C. Prentice	4 September 1962	Birkin's Bend	1962 Manx Grand Prix	Junior	AJS
73	England	Keith T. Gawler	6 September 1962	Pinfold Cottage	1962 Manx Grand Prix	Senior	499cc Norton
74	England	Raymond Rowe	5 September 1963	Verandah	1963 Manx Grand Prix	Senior	499cc Norton
75	England	Brian W. Cockell	2 June 1964	Braddan Bridge	1964 Isle of Man TT	Practice	Norton
76	England	Laurence P. Essery	9 June 1964	Ballaugh Bridge	1964 Isle of Man TT	Sidecar TT (Passenger)	Matchless
77	England	George B. Armstrong	1 September 1965	Sulby Bridge	1965 Manx Grand Prix	Practice	Triton
78	Japan	Toshio Fujii	26 August 1966	Cruickshank's Corner	1966 Isle of Man TT	Practice	125cc Kawasaki
79	United Kingdom	Brian Duffy	28 August 1966	Mountain Box	1966 Isle of Man TT	Lightweight TT	250cc Yamaha
80	England	Alfred E Shaw	10 June 1967	Mountain Box	1967 Isle of Man TT	Practice	500cc Norton
81	England	Geoffery Proctor	29 August 1967	Rhencullen	1967 Manx Grand Prix	Practice	248cc Cotton
82	England	Kenneth E. Herbert	1 September 1967	Doran's Bend	1967 Manx Grand Prix	Practice	499cc Norton
83	New Zealand	Ian D. Veitch	10 June 1968	Ballagarey Corner	1968 Isle of Man TT	Lightweight TT	Kawasaki
84	England	Peter Ray	3 September 1968	Ballaugh Bridge	1968 Manx Grand Prix	Lightweight	Aermacchi
85	Wales	Roger Perrier	3 September 1968	Kirk Michael	1968 Manx Grand Prix	Junior	Norton
86	England	Arthur Lavington	6 June 1969	Alpine Cottage	1969 Isle of Man TT	Practice	350cc Velocette
87	England	Gordon V.Taylor	25 August 1969	Alpine Cottage	1969 Manx Grand Prix	Practice	325cc Kawasaki
88	England	Michael L. Bennett	26 August 1969	Glen Helen	1969 Manx Grand Prix	Practice	500cc Norton
89	Scotland	Iain Sidey	28 August 1969	Quarterbridge Road	1969 Manx Grand Prix	Practice	Norton
90	England	Les Iles	1 June 1970	Kate's Cottage	1970 Isle of Man TT	Practice	125cc Bultaco
91	England	Michael Collins	3 June 1970	Verandah	1970 Isle of Man TT	Practice	496cc Seeley
92	England	Denis Blower	3 June 1970	Mountain Box	1970 Isle of Man TT	Practice	499cc BSA Sidecar
93	Spain	Santiago Herrero	8 June 1970	13th Milestone	1970 Isle of Man TT	Lightweight TT	250cc Ossa
94	Malta	John Wetherall	12 June 1970	Gardener's Lane/Glen Auldyn	1970 Isle of Man TT	Senior TT	499cc Norton
95	Northern Ireland	Brian Steenson	12 June 1970	Mountain Box	1970 Isle of Man TT	Senior TT	498cc Seeley
96	England	George Collis	1 September 1970	Handley's Corner	1970 Manx Grand Prix	Lightweight	Yamaha
97	England	Brian Finch	9 June 1971	Ballacraine	1971 Isle of Man TT	500 cc Production Race	Suzuki T500
98	Wales	Maurice A. Jeffery	12 June 1971	Birkin's Bend	1971 Isle of Man TT	Senior TT	499cc Manx Norton
99	Italy	Gilberto Parlotti	9 June 1972	Verandah	1972 Isle of Man TT	Ultra-Lightweight TT	125cc Morbidelli
100	Ireland	Chris M. Clarke	28 August 1972	Glen Helen	1972 Manx Grand Prix	Practice	250cc Yamaha
101	England	John L. Clarke	2 June 1973	Union Mills	1973 Isle of Man TT	250cc Production TT	Suzuki T20 Super Six
102	England	Eric R. Piner	5 September 1973	Douglas Road Corner	1973 Manx Grand Prix	Lightweight	250cc Yamaha
103	England	Peter L. Hardy	27 May 1974	Laurel Bank	1974 Isle of Man TT	Practice – Sidecar	750cc HTS – Imp
104	England	David J. Nixon	1 June 1974	Glen Helen	1974 Isle of Man TT	1000cc Production TT	741cc Triumph Trident
105	England	Nigel J. Christian	26 August 1974	Windy Corner	1974 Manx Grand Prix	Practice	250cc Yamaha
106	England	David Forrester	3 September 1974	Black Dub	1974 Manx Grand Prix	Junior	350cc Kirby – Metisse
107	England	Peter McKinley	28 May 1975	Pinfold Cottage,, Milntown	1975 Isle of Man TT	Practice	700cc Yamaha
108	England	Phil Gurner	4 June 1975	Pinfold Cottage,, Milntown	1975 Isle of Man TT	Senior TT	351cc Yamaha
109	Northern Ireland	Brian McComb	2 September 1975	Barregarrow	1975 Manx Grand Prix	Lightweight	250cc Yamaha
110	West Germany	Walter Wörner	7 June 1976	Greeba Castle	1976 Isle of Man TT	Sidecar TT	496cc Yamaha
111	Australia	Les Kenny	12 June 1976	Snugborough, Braddan	1976 Isle of Man TT	Lightweight TT	250cc Yamaha
112	England	David Featherstone	7 September 1976	Alpine Cottage	1976 Manx Grand Prix	Junior	350cc Yamaha
113	England	Peter Tulley	30 August 1977	Alpine Cottage	1977 Manx Grand Prix	Practice	347cc Yamaha
114	Northern Ireland	Ivan Houston	31 August 1977	Lambfell	1977 Manx Grand Prix	Practice	250cc Yamaha
115	England	Norman Tricoglus	3 September 1977	Rhencullen	1977 Manx Grand Prix	Practice	347cc Yamaha
116	England	Neil Edwards	7 September 1977	Cruickshank's Corner	1977 Manx Grand Prix	Junior	347cc Yamaha
117	Wales	Stephen Davies	1 June 1978	Laurel Bank	1978 Isle of Man TT	Practice	347cc Yamaha
118	England	Mac Hobson	5 June 1978	Bray Hill	1978 Isle of Man TT	Sidecar TT	750cc Yamaha
119	England	Kenny Birch	5 June 1978	Bray Hill	1978 Isle of Man TT	Sidecar TT (Passenger)	750cc Yamaha
120	Switzerland	Ernst Trachsel	5 June 1978	Quarterbridge Road	1978 Isle of Man TT	Sidecar TT	499cc Suzuki
121	New Zealand	Michael Adler	9 June 1978	Glen Helen	1978 Isle of Man TT	Classic TT	350cc Yamaha
122	England	Michael L. Sharpe	29 August 1978	Cruickshank's Corner	1978 Manx Grand Prix	Practice	347cc Yamaha
123	England	Steve Verne	4 June 1979	Barregarrow	1979 Isle of Man TT	Sidecar TT (Passenger)	738cc Suzuki
124	United Kingdom	Fred Launchbury	8 June 1979	Glentramman	1979 Isle of Man TT	Formula III	248cc Maico
125	England	Stephen R. Holmes	27 August 1979	Cruickshank's Corner	1979 Manx Grand Prix	Practice	350cc Yamaha
126	England	Alain Taylor	6 September 1979	Rhencullen	1979 Manx Grand Prix	Lightweight	246cc Yamaha
127	England	Martin B. Ames	31 May 1980	Quarterbridge Road	1980 Isle of Man TT	Sidecar TT	750cc Yamaha
128	England	Andrew M. Holme	2 June 1980	Glentramman	1980 Isle of Man TT	Sidecar TT	Yamaha
129	England	Roger W. Corbett	6 June 1980	Glen Helen	1980 Isle of Man TT	Classic Race	948cc Kawasaki
130	Australia	Kenneth M. Blake	9 June 1981	Ballagarey Corner	1981 Isle of Man TT	Senior TT	350cc Yamaha
131	England	Alan K. Atkins	8 September 1983	School House Corner	1983 Manx Grand Prix	Senior	347cc Yamaha
132	United Kingdom	Roger J. Cox	29 May 1984	Sarah's Cottage	1984 Isle of Man TT	Sidecar Practice	750cc Yamaha
133	Northern Ireland	David James Millar	30 August 1984	Pinfold Cottage,, Milntown	1984 Manx Grand Prix	Practice	350cc Aermacchi
134	Sweden	Sven Tomas Eriksson	28 May 1985	Alpine Cottage – (Iceman's House)	1985 Isle of Man TT	Practice Sidecar TT	750cc Yamaha
135	Sweden	Mats Urban Eriksson	28 May 1985	Alpine Cottage – (Iceman's House)	1985 Isle of Man TT	Practice – Sidecar TT (Passenger)	750cc Yamaha
136	England	Rob Vine	7 June 1985	Black Dub	1985 Isle of Man TT	Senior TT	500cc RG Suzuki
137	Isle of Man	Ian Ogden	28 May 1986	Cronk-y-Voddy	1986 Isle of Man TT	Practice	500cc Suzuki
138	England	Alan G. Jarvis	30 May 1986	Quarterbridge Road	1986 Isle of Man TT	Practice	750cc Yamaha
139	Ireland	Eugene P. McDonnell	4 June 1986	Ballaugh Bridge	1986 Isle of Man TT	Lightweight TT	250cc EMC
140	England	Andy Cooper	6 June 1986	Ballig	1986 Isle of Man TT	Senior TT	750cc Suzuki
141	United Kingdom	Nigel Hale	27 August 1986	Sarah's Cottage	1986 Manx Grand Prix	Practice	250cc EMC
142	Ireland	Kenneth P. Norton	25 August 1987	32nd Milestone	1987 Manx Grand Prix	Practice	350cc Yamaha
143	United Kingdom	Martin Jennings	1 September 1987	Rhencullen	1987 Manx Grand Prix	Practice	350cc Yamaha
144	United Kingdom	Ricky Dumble	2 June 1988	Quarterbridge Road	1988 Isle of Man TT	Practice	750cc Yamaha
145	United Kingdom	Kenneth N. Harmer	3 June 1988	Waterworks	1988 Isle of Man TT	Practice	750cc Honda RC 30
146	United Kingdom	Brian Warburton	3 June 1988	Appledene	1988 Isle of Man TT	Production TT	600cc Honda
147	Italy	Marco Fattorelli	30 May 1989	Greeba Castle	1989 Isle of Man TT	Practice Sidecar TT (passenger)	750cc Yamaha
148	United Kingdom	John Mulcahy	30 May 1989	Barregarrow	1989 Isle of Man TT	Practice Sidecar TT	1300cc Suzuki
149	Isle of Man	Phil Hogg	2 June 1989	Ballagarey Corner	1989 Isle of Man TT	Practice	250cc TZ Yamaha
150	United Kingdom	Phil Mellor	7 June 1989	Doran's Bend	1989 Isle of Man TT	Production TT	1100cc GSXR Suzuki
151	United Kingdom	Steve Henshaw	7 June 1989	Quarry Bends	1989 Isle of Man TT	Production TT	1000cc FZR Yamaha
152	Scotland	Colin Keith	29 August 1989	Hillberry Corner	1989 Manx Grand Prix	Practice	500cc BSA
153	United Kingdom	Ian Standeven	6 September 1989	Rhencullen	1989 Manx Grand Prix	Junior	347cc Yamaha
154	Isle of Man	John Smyth	8 September 1989	Verandah	1989 Manx Grand Prix	Senior	1100cc Suzuki
155	United Kingdom	Bernard Trout	3 September 1990	Hawthorn, Greeba	1990 Manx Grand Prix	Lightweight Classic	250cc Ducati
156	United Kingdom	Kevin Howe	7 September 1990	School House Corner	1990 Manx Grand Prix	Senior	750cc Honda RC30
157	United Kingdom	Ian Young	28 May 1991	Appledene	1991 Isle of Man TT	Practice	Suzuki RGV 250cc
158	Czechoslovakia	Petr Hlavatka	29 May 1991	The Nook	1991 Isle of Man TT	Practice	750cc Suzuki
159	Ireland	Frank Duffy	30 May 1991	Kerrowmoar	1991 Isle of Man TT	Practice	125cc Honda
160	Scotland	Roy Anderson	1 June 1991	Stonebreakers Hut	1991 Isle of Man TT	Formula 1 TT	750cc Yamaha
161	Isle of Man	Paul Rome	29 August 1991	Cronk-ny-Mona	1991 Manx Grand Prix	Practice	250cc Yamaha
162	United Kingdom	Mark Jackson	6 September 1991	Glentramman	1991 Manx Grand Prix	Senior	600cc CBR F Honda
163	Austria	Manfred Stengl	6 June 1992	33rd Milestone	1992 Isle of Man TT	Formula 1 TT	750cc Suzuki
164	United Kingdom	Craig Mason	3 September 1992	Glentramman	1992 Manx Grand Prix	Junior	249cc Yamaha
165	United Kingdom	John Judge	3 September 1992	Rhencullen	1992 Manx Grand Prix	Junior	600cc FZR Yamaha
166	United Kingdom	Steve Harding	9 June 1993	Laurel Bank	1993 Isle of Man TT	600cc Supersport Race	600cc FZR Yamaha
167	United Kingdom	Kenneth J. Virgo	3 September 1993	Handley's Corner	1993 Manx Grand Prix	Lightweight	250cc Yamaha
168	Scotland	Rob Mitchell	2 June 1994	Gooseneck	1994 Isle of Man TT	Practice	Yamaha FZR 600cc
169	United Kingdom	Mark Farmer	2 June 1994	Black Dub	1994 Isle of Man TT	Practice	Britten V-Twin 1000cc
170	United Kingdom	Cliff Gobell	29 August 1994	Quarry Bends	1994 Manx Grand Prix	Senior Classic	492cc Weslake
171	Isle of Man	Paul Fargher	3 June 1995	Sulby Straight	1995 Isle of Man TT	Sidecar TT (Passenger)	600cc Yamaha
172	United Kingdom	Duncan Muir	30 August 1995	Guthrie's Memorial	1995 Manx Grand Prix	Junior	600cc Honda
173	United Kingdom	Nicholas EA Teale	1 September 1995	Alpine Cottage	1995 Manx Grand Prix	Lightweight	250cc Yamaha
174	England	Aaron Kennedy	27 May 1996	Crosby Cross-Roads	1996 Isle of Man TT	Sidecar TT Practice (passenger)	600cc Kawasaki
175	New Zealand	Rob Holden	31 May 1996	Glen Helen	1996 Isle of Man TT	Practice	916 Ducati
176	England	Mick Lofthouse	31 May 1996	Pinfold Cottage, (Sky Hill)	1996 Isle of Man TT	Practice	250cc Spondon Yamaha
177	England	Stephen J. Tannock	1 June 1996	Churchtown	1996 Isle of Man TT	Formula 1 TT	Honda RC 30
178	United Kingdom	Nigel Haddon	19 August 1996	Stonebreakers Hut	1996 Manx Grand Prix	Practice	750cc Honda
179	Scotland	Jack Gow	19 August 1996	32nd Milestone	1996 Manx Grand Prix	Practice	350cc Norton
180	England	Russell Waring	26 May 1997	Union Mills	1997 Isle of Man TT	Practice	125cc TZ Yamaha
181	England	Colin Gable	26 May 1997	Ballagarey Corner	1997 Isle of Man TT	Practice	750cc Honda
182	Isle of Man	Danny Shimmin	16 August 1997	Greeba Castle	1997 Manx Grand Prix	Practice	349cc Aermacchi
183	Isle of Man	Pamela Cannell	18 August 1997	Bungalow Bridge	1997 Manx Grand Prix	Practice	250cc Yamaha
184	United Kingdom	Roger Bowler	18 August 1997	Quarry Bends	1997 Manx Grand Prix	Practice	500cc Matchless
185	Ireland	Emmet Nolan	29 August 1997	Lambfell	1997 Manx Grand Prix	Senior	750cc Yamaha
186	Isle of Man	Mike Casey	8 June 1998	Ballagarey Corner	1998 Isle of Man TT	Practice	Honda RS 250cc
187	Wales	Charles Ian Hardisty	12 June 1998	Kerrowmoar	1998 Isle of Man TT	Production TT	Kawasaki ZXR7RR
188	England	John Henderson	27 June 1998	Rhencullen	1998 Isle of Man TT	Senior TT	Honda 750cc
189	United Kingdom	Adam Woodhall	27 August 1998	Ballaspur	1998 Manx Grand Prix	Practice	996cc Suzuki
190	United Kingdom	Rob Wingrave	27 August 1998	Union Mills	1998 Manx Grand Prix	Senior Classic	500cc Norton
191	United Kingdom	Chris East	31 August 1998	Kirk Michael	1998 Manx Grand Prix	Senior Classic	Matchless
192	Netherlands	Bernadette Bosman-Saalbrink	31 May 1999	Douglas Road Corner	1999 Isle of Man TT	Practice Sidecar TT (Passenger)	600cc Ireson Yamaha
193	England	Simon Beck	1 June 1999	33rd Milestone	1999 Isle of Man TT	Practice	Honda RC45
194	England	Terry Fenton	7 June 1999	Hillberry Corner	1999 Isle of Man TT	Sidecar TT (Passenger)	Honda CBR 600cc
195	New Zealand	Stuart Murdoch	9 June 1999	Gorse Lea	1999 Isle of Man TT	Junior TT	Honda 600cc
196	England	Martin J. Smith	3 September 1999	13th Milestone	1999 Manx Grand Prix	Senior	600cc Honda
197	England	Stephen Wood	29 May 2000	Whitegates	2000 Isle of Man TT	Practice Sidecar TT (passenger)	Baker Yamaha 600cc
198	England	Chris Ascott	30 May 2000	Westwood Corner	2000 Isle of Man TT	Practice	Kawasaki ZXR400
199	Northern Ireland	Raymond Hanna	31 May 2000	Greeba Castle	2000 Isle of Man TT	Practice	TZ 250cc Yamaha
200	England	Leslie Williams	9 June 2000	Ballaugh Bridge	2000 Isle of Man TT	Production TT	1000cc Honda VTR-SP1
201	England	Kenneth Munro	19 August 2000	Ginger Hall	2000 Manx Grand Prix	Practice	600cc Honda
202	England	Colin Daniels	27 May 2002	Bray Hill	2002 Isle of Man TT	Practice	600cc Suzuki
203	England	Shane Ellis	19 August 2002	Ballaspur	2002 Manx Grand Prix	Practice	1000cc Aprilia
204	England	Leslie Turner	19 August 2002	Ballaspur	2002 Manx Grand Prix	Practice	600cc Yamaha
205	England	Phil Hayhurst	31 August 2002	School House Corner	2002 Manx Grand Prix	Ultra-Lightweight	124cc Yamaha
206	England	David Jefferies	29 May 2003	Crosby	2003 Isle of Man TT	Practice	Suzuki GSX-R1000
207	United Kingdom	Martin Farley	25 August 2003	Alpine Cottage	2003 Manx Grand Prix	Newcomers	600cc Yamaha
208	France	Serge Le Moal	29 May 2004	Braddan Bridge	2004 Isle of Man TT	Practice	125cc Honda RS
209	Isle of Man	Paul Cowley	2 June 2004	Black Dub	2004 Isle of Man TT	Practice Sidecar TT (Passenger)	600cc Yamaha Thundercat
210	England	Colin Breeze	5 June 2004	Quarry Bends	2004 Isle of Man TT	Formula 1 TT	Suzuki GSX-R1000
211	Isle of Man	Gavin Feighery	28 August 2004	Mountain Box	2004 Manx Grand Prix	Practice	600cc Suzuki
212	Isle of Man	Tommy Clucas	1 September 2004	Ballaugh Bridge	2004 Manx Grand Prix	Junior	600cc Honda
213	Sweden	Joakim Karlsson	30 May 2005	Douglas Road Corner	2005 Isle of Man TT	Practice	1000cc Suzuki GSXR
214	England	Les Harah	4 June 2005	Parliament Square, Ramsey	2005 Isle of Man TT	Sidecar Race A	600cc Yamaha
215	England	Gus Scott	10 June 2005	Kirk Michael	2005 Isle of Man TT	Senior TT	1000cc Honda CBR
216	England	Geoff Sawyer	24 August 2005	Union Mills	2005 Manx Grand Prix	Practice	496cc Matchless
217	England	John Loder	26 August 2005	33rd Milestone	2005 Manx Grand Prix	Practice	496cc Seeley
218	England	Eddie Byers	31 August 2005	27th Milestone	2005 Manx Grand Prix	Junior Classic	350cc 7R AJS
219	England	Tim Johnson	31 August 2005	Stonebreakers Hut	2005 Manx Grand Prix	Junior Classic	349cc Aermacchi
220	Ireland	John Bourke	1 September 2005	Union Mills	2005 Manx Grand Prix	Junior	600cc Suzuki
221	Wales	Don Leeson	2 September 2005	Quarry Bends	2005 Manx Grand Prix	Ultra-Lightweight	400cc Honda
222	Japan	Jun Maeda	29 May 2006	Ballahutchin Hill	2006 Isle of Man TT	Practice	1000cc Honda Fireblade
223	Isle of Man	Terry Craine	21 August 2006	33rd Milestone	2006 Manx Grand Prix	Practice	250cc Honda
224	England	Marc Ramsbotham	8 June 2007	26th Milestone	2007 Isle of Man TT	Senior TT	1000cc GSXR Suzuki
225	Wales	John Goodall	25 August 2008	Ballacraine	2008 Manx Grand Prix	Junior Classic Race	AJS 7R 349cc
226	Isle of Man	John Crellin	12 June 2009	Mountain Mile	2009 Isle of Man TT	Senior TT	1000cc Suzuki
227	England	Richard Bartlett	1 September 2009	Kerrowmoar	2009 Manx Grand Prix	Newcomers Race – Class A	Honda CBR 600cc
228	New Zealand	Paul Dobbs	10 June 2010	Ballagarey Corner	2010 Isle of Man TT	Supersport TT Race 2	600cc Suzuki
229	Austria	Martin Loicht	10 June 2010	Quarry Bends	2010 Isle of Man TT	Supersport TT Race 2	600cc Honda
230	Scotland	Jamie Adam	1 September 2010	Alpine Cottage	2010 Manx Grand Prix	Junior	600cc Suzuki GSX-R
231	England	Chris Bradshaw	1 September 2010	Alpine Cottage	2010 Manx Grand Prix	Junior	600cc Yamaha R6
232	England	Bill Currie	31 May 2011	Ballacrye Corner	2011 Isle of Man TT	Practice Sidecar TT	600cc LCR Yamaha
233	England	Kevin Morgan	31 May 2011	Ballacrye Corner	2011 Isle of Man TT	Practice Sidecar TT (Passenger)	600cc LCR Yamaha
234	Ireland	Derek Brien	6 June 2011	Gorse Lea	2011 Isle of Man TT	Supersport TT Race 1	600cc Yamaha
235	England	Neil Kent	24 August 2011	Greeba Bridge	2011 Manx Grand Prix	Practice	250cc Yamaha
236	Northern Ireland	Wayne Hamilton	29 August 2011	13th Milestone	2011 Manx Grand Prix	Junior	600cc Yamaha R6
237	Scotland	Adam Easton	31 August 2011	Lambfell	2011 Manx Grand Prix	500cc Classic	499cc Norton Manx
238	Isle of Man	Steve Osborne	24 August 2012	Quarterbridge Road	2012 Manx Grand Prix	Practice	650cc Hyosung
239	Northern Ireland	Trevor Ferguson	29 August 2012	The Nook	2012 Manx Grand Prix	Super-Twin Race	650cc Kawasaki
240	Japan	Yoshinari Matsushita	27 May 2013	Ballacrye Corner	2013 Isle of Man TT	Practice	600cc Suzuki
241	England	Bob Price	2 June 2014	Ballaugh Bridge	2014 Isle of Man TT	Supersport TT Race 1	600cc Yamaha
242	England	Karl Harris	3 June 2014	26th Milestone	2014 Isle of Man TT	Superstock TT	1000cc Kawasaki
243	Northern Ireland	Stephen McIlvenna	19 August 2014	Mountain Mile	2014 Manx Grand Prix	Practice	600cc Yamaha
244	England	Tim Moorhead	22 August 2014	29th Milestone	2014 Manx Grand Prix	Practice	700cc Suzuki
245	England	Gary Firth	29 August 2014	11th Milestone	2014 Manx Grand Prix	Senior	600cc Honda
246	France	Franck Petricola	3 June 2015	Sulby Straight / (Ballacowell)	2015 Isle of Man TT	Practice	BMW S1000RR
247	Netherlands	Dennis Hoffer	26 August 2015	13th Milestone	2015 Manx Grand Prix	Practice	Honda CBR600
248	England	David Taylor	4 September 2015	Brandywell Corner	2015 Manx Grand Prix	Senior	Suzuki
249	Australia	Dwight Beare	4 June 2016	Orrisdale North	2016 Isle of Man TT	Sidecar TT Race 1	600cc Suzuki LCR
250	England	Paul Shoesmith	4 June 2016	Sulby Straight	2016 Isle of Man TT	Practice	BMW S1000RR
251	England	Ian Bell	10 June 2016	Ballaspur	2016 Isle of Man TT	Sidecar TT Race 2	600cc Yamaha LCR
252	England	Andrew Soar	10 June 2016	Keppel Gate	2016 Isle of Man TT	Senior TT	1000cc GSX-R Suzuki
253	England	Davey Lambert	6 June 2017	Greeba Castle	2017 Isle of Man TT	Superbike TT	1000cc Kawasaki
254	Netherlands	Jochem van den Hoek	7 June 2017	11th Milestone	2017 Isle of Man TT	Superstock TT	1000cc Honda
255	Ireland	Alan Bonner	7 June 2017	33rd Milestone	2017 Isle of Man TT	Senior Qualifying	BMW S1000RR
256	Isle of Man	Dan Kneen	30 May 2018	Sky Hill/(Churchtown)	2018 Isle of Man TT	Practice	BMW S1000RR
257	Scotland	Adam Lyon	4 June 2018	Casey's	2018 Isle of Man TT	Supersport TT Race 1	600cc Yamaha
258	England	Alan 'Bud' Jackson	24 August 2018	Creg-ny-Baa	2018 Classic TT	Practice	500cc Norton
259	England	Daley Mathison	3 June 2019	Snugborough	2019 Isle of Man TT	Superbike TT	1000cc BMW
260	New Zealand	Chris Swallow	24 August 2019	Ballaugh Bridge	2019 Classic TT	Senior Classic TT	500cc Royal Enfield
261	Wales	Mark Purslow	1 June 2022	Ballagarey Corner	2022 Isle of Man TT	Supersport TT qualifying	600cc Yamaha YZF-R6
262	France	César Chanal	4 June 2022	Ago's Leap	2022 Isle of Man TT	Sidecar TT (Driver)	600cc Honda SGR
263	Northern Ireland	Davy Morgan	6 June 2022	27th Milestone	2022 Isle of Man TT	Supersport TT	600cc Yamaha YZF-R6
264	England	Roger Stockton	10 June 2022	Ago's Leap	2022 Isle of Man TT	Sidecar TT (Driver)	600cc Suzuki LCR
265	England	Bradley Stockton	10 June 2022	Ago's Leap	2022 Isle of Man TT	Sidecar TT (Passenger)	600cc Suzuki LCR
266	France	Olivier Lavorel	26 October 2022	Ago's Leap	2022 Isle of Man TT	Sidecar TT (Passenger)	600cc Honda SGR
267	Spain	Raúl Torras Martínez	6 June 2023	Alpine Cottage	2023 Isle of Man TT	Supertwin	Aprilia RS 660
268	England	Gary Vines	20 August 2023	Ballagarey Corner	2023 Manx Grand Prix	Practice	750cc Kawasaki
269	England	Ian Bainbridge	22 August 2023	Kirk Michael	2023 Manx Grand Prix	Practice	Norton Manx
270	Ireland	Louis O'Regan	18 August 2024	Kate's Cottage	2024 Manx Grand Prix	Qualifying	MV Agusta F3
271	England	Daniel Ingham	27 May 2026	Doran's Bend	2026 Isle of Man TT	Qualifying	
272	Switzerland	Mauro Poncini	18 August 2026	Cruickshanks	2026 Manx Grand Prix	Qualifying	Yamaha YZF-R6
273	Isle of Man	Sam Naughton	19 August 2026	Doran's Bend	2026 Manx Grand Prix	Qualifying	Triumph 765

=== Motor racing (other) ===
No	Country	Driver	Date	Place	Race	Event	Machine
1	Scotland	James Neilson	18 June 1953	Cronk-y-Berry	1953 British Empire Trophy (Douglas circuit)	Feature Race	Frazer-Nash

== Other deaths ==
=== Race officials ===
Competition

No	Country	Official	Date	Place	Race	Event	Role
1	United Kingdom	Denis A. Hamer	7 September 1976	Union Mills	1976 Manx Grand Prix	Senior Manx Grand Prix	Police officer
2	United Kingdom	April Bolster	10 June 2005	Kirk Michael	2005 Isle of Man TT	Senior TT	Marshal

Non competition

No	Country	Official	Date	Place	Race	Event	Role
1	Isle of Man	Bernard Rodgers	10 June 1953	Gorse Lea	1953 Isle of Man TT		Marshal
2	United Kingdom	John Goldsmith	28 May 1962	Union Mills	1962 Isle of Man TT		TT travelling marshal
3	Isle of Man	Martyn Heyes	1 September 2006	Gorse Lea	2006 Manx Grand Prix		Marshal

=== Parade laps ===
No	Country	Rider	Date	Place	Race	Event	Machine
1	United Kingdom	Jack Trustham	9 June 1998	Kirk Michael	1998 Isle of Man TT	Lap of Honour	Imp Classic 998cc
2	Switzerland	Peter Järmann	2 June 2003	Parkfield crossroads (Bray Hill)	2003 Isle of Man TT	Lap of Honour	1964 Bultaco TSS 250cc

=== Unofficial competition testing ===
No	Country	Rider	Date	Place	Race	Event	Machine
1	Wales	Samuel GR Birt	21 August 1926	Marathon Bridge	1926 Manx Amateur Road Races	Practice	Zenith
2	England	John Simister	28 May 1951	East Mountain Gate	1951 Isle of Man TT	Practice	
3	Australia	Laurie Boulter	31 May 1954	Handley's Corner	1954 Isle of Man TT	Practice	Norton

=== Spectators ===
Competition

No	Country	Name	Date	Place	Race	Event	Role
1	United Kingdom	Dean Jacob	8 June 2007	26th Milestone	2007 Isle of Man TT	Senior TT	Spectator
2	Australia	Gregory Kenzig	8 June 2007	26th Milestone	2007 Isle of Man TT	Senior TT	Spectator

Non competition

No	Country	Name	Date	Place	Race	Event	Role
1	Isle of Man	Frank Windsor	16 June 1939	Highlander Inn	1939 Isle of Man TT		Bystander
2	Isle of Man	Donald Cameron	16 June 1939	Highlander Inn	1939 Isle of Man TT		Pit attendant
3	United Kingdom	PH Guest	28 May 1980	Braddan Bridge	1980 Isle of Man TT		TT marshal
4	United Kingdom	Tim O'Connell	29 August 2005	Quarterbridge	2005 Manx Grand Prix		Bystander

== By nationality ==
Nationality	Total	Riders	Other
England	128	127	1
United Kingdom, otherwise unspecified	54	46	8
Northern Ireland	10	10	0
Scotland	9	8	1
Wales	7	7	0
United Kingdom, total	207	197	10
Isle of Man	18	16	2
New Zealand	8	8	0
Australia	8	6	2
Ireland	6	6	0
France	4	4	0
Sweden	3	3	0
Japan	3	3	0
Netherlands	3	3	0
Switzerland	4	3	1
Germany	2	2	0
Austria	2	2	0
Italy	2	2	0
Spain	2	2	0
South Africa	1	1	0
Malta	1	1	0
Southern Rhodesia	1	1	0
Czechoslovakia	1	1	0
Total	282	266	16

== See also ==
- Isle of Man TT Races
- Manx Grand Prix
- North West 200
- Ulster Grand Prix
- Clypse Course
- St. John's Short Course
- List of Billown Course fatal crashs
- List of North West 200 Course fatal crashs
- List of Dundrod Circuit fatal crashs
