= Steve Henshaw =

British motorcycle racer

- Henshaw in September 1982 with his then-new Spondon-framed bike debuted at Mallory Park having fairing-lowers removed to show the square-section aluminium frame, Suzuki RG500 engine and braced swinging-arm
- Nationality: British
- Born: 2 April 1954; Nottingham
- Died: 7 June 1989 (aged 35); Isle of Man
Motorcycle racing career statistics
Isle of Man TT career
TTs contested	23

Steven J. Henshaw (2 April 1954 – 7 June 1989) was an English professional motorcycle racer and working motorcycle mechanic.

== Biography ==
Born in Nottingham, East Midlands, Henshaw began racing at the nearby club circuit at Darley Moor in Derbyshire, progressing to circuits like Mallory Park and twice winning the Scarborough Gold Cup held at the Oliver's Mount race circuit.

Henshaw's road racing career included racing on both street circuits and race circuits. His road race entries included a total of 23 appearances at the Isle of Man TT from 1981 to 1989. He made one appearance in the Grand Prix world championships finishing in 17th place at the 1983 British Grand Prix.

Henshaw also made appearances in motor-racing films Silver Dream Racer and Space Riders.

Henshaw died after an accident at Quarry Bends during the 1989 Isle of Man TT races. When trying to avoid fallen James Whitham, Henshaw and Mike Seward touched trying to avoid the debris, and Henshaw was killed instantly in the crash.

== Personal life ==
Henshaw was married to Val.

== Legacy ==
The popular Henshaw has a Trophy named in his honour at the Gold Cup races held at Oliver's Mount, a road-based circuit through parkland near the Yorkshire east coast holiday resort of Scarborough.

== See also ==
- List of Snaefell Mountain Course fatalities
