= Marie Lambert =

Swiss motorcycle racer (1935–1961)

- Nationality: Swiss
- Born: 1935; Châtonnaye, Switzerland
- Died: 12 June 1961 (aged 25–26); Isle of Man
Motorcycle racing career statistics
Isle of Man TT career
TTs contested	1 (1961)

Marie-Laure Rosene Lambert (1935 – 12 June 1961) was a Swiss motorcycle racer.

Lambert took up motorcycle racing in 1960, as a sidecar passenger, initially to replace her husband Claude's partner, who was late for a race.

Lambert competed as a female passenger to her husband, sidecar driver Claude Lambert. At the 1961 Isle of Man TT races, their BMW sidecar outfit crashed at Gob-ny-Geay (35th mile marker) before Brandish Corner, and Lambert died from her injuries.

The crash was caused by faulty welding, which her husband had entrusted to a specialist. She died instantly when the following sidecar hit her.
