= Gorse Lea =

Section of road

- Location within Isle of Man
- 54°11′53.2″N 4°37′6″W

History
- Built: 1949, 1953–1954

Gorse Lea (Manx: Ballagarraghyn – the farm of O'Dorgan) is situated between the 6th Milestone and 7th Milestones on the primary A1 Douglas to Peel road in the parish of German in the Isle of Man.

== Motor-sport heritage ==
The Gorse Lea (Ballagarraghyn) section of the A1 Douglas to Peel road was part of the short Highland Course (40.38 miles) from 1906 and the also the 37.50 Mile Four Inch Course used for automobile racing including the RAC Tourist Trophy car races held between 1905 and 1922.

A section of the Douglas to Peel road from Ballacraine to Quarterbridge, Douglas, including Gorse Lea and nearby Greeba Bridge was used for the 1905 International Motor-Cycle Cup Races.

In 1911, the Four Inch Course was first used by the Auto-Cycling Union for the Isle of Man TT motorcycle races. This included the Gorse Lea section and the course later became known as the 37.73 mile Isle of Man TT Mountain Course which has been used since 1911 for the Isle of Man TT Races and from 1923 for the Manx Grand Prix races.

== Road improvements ==
The Greeba section on the primary A2 Douglas to Peel road including Gorse Lea was widened and reprofiled in 1949 and further widened for the 1953 Isle of Man TT races.
