= Phil Mellor =

British motorcycle racer

- Mellor at Mallory Park in 1982
- Nationality: British
- Born: 25 February 1954
- Died: 7 June 1989 (aged 35); Isle of Man
Motorcycle racing career statistics
Isle of Man TT career
TTs contested	34
TT wins	3
First TT win	1983 Junior 350 cc
Last TT win	1986 Production 'B'
TT podiums	7

Glyn Philip Mellor (Phil 'Mez' Mellor, 25 February 1954 – 7 June 1989) was a Yorkshire-based English motorcycle racer. His career included racing on both road and race circuits. Mellor, from Shelley, near Huddersfield, West Yorkshire, died after an accident at Doran's Bend during the 1989 TT races on the Isle of Man.

Mellor's race results included the 1984 TT Formula 2 Championship aboard a Yamaha 350, 125cc Gold Star 1981 Championship aboard a Honda, 1300cc Production 1986 British championship on a Suzuki, back to back 750cc Production championships in 1986 and 1987 for Suzuki, 1979 British 250cc Championship, Avon Roadrunner Production 500cc championship on a Yamaha 350 and back to back Honda 125cc championship victories in 1980 and 1981.

Road race results included three wins, seven podiums and a total of 34 appearances at the Isle of Man TT. He also competed at the NW200, Ulster GP, won the 1978 Newcomers Lightweight Manx Grand Prix and scored a fifth place at Macau.

The popular Yorkshireman has a Trophy named in his honour at the Gold Cup races held at Oliver's Mount, a road-based circuit through parkland, in the North Yorkshire east coast holiday resort of Scarborough.
