= List of Dundrod Circuit fatalities =

Fatal accidents on the Dundrod Circuit during the Ulster Grand Prix and other motor-sport events.

== List of fatal accidents involving competitors ==
No	Rider	Date	Place	Series	Race	Type
1	(England) Julian Crossley	11 August 1955		1955 Ulster Grand Prix		350cc Norton
2	(Isle of Man) Derek Ennett	9 August 1956	Budore	1956 Ulster Grand Prix		250cc Moto Guzzi
4	(Wales) Carl Todd	24 June 1961		1956 Killinchy 150 Races		350cc Norton
5	(Australia) Ronald L.Miles	9 August 1961	Rusheyhill	1961 Ulster Grand Prix	Practice	350cc Norton
6	(Northern Ireland) Norman Connor	22 June 1974	Wheelers Corner	1974 Killinchy 150 Races	Practice	350cc Yamaha
7	(England) Geoff Barry	25 June 1977	Tournagrough	1977 Killinchy 150 Races	1000cc Superbike Race	750cc TZ Yamaha
8	(Isle of Man) George Oates	20 August 1977	Tournagrough	1977 Ulster Grand Prix	Sidecar Race	984cc Kawasaki
9	(Isle of Man) John Molyneux (Note: article refers to his son)	20 August 1977	Tournagrough	1977 Ulster Grand Prix	Sidecar Race (Passenger)	984cc Kawasaki
10	(United Kingdom) Jermery M.Swann	10 August 1978	Budore	1978 Ulster Grand Prix	Practice	500cc Suzuki
11	(United Kingdom) John Williams	12 August 1978	Wheelers	1978 Ulster Grand Prix	TT Formula 1 Race	750cc Suzuki
12	(United Kingdom) Stephen Smith	August 1986	Windmill	1986 Ulster Grand Prix	350cc Race	
13	(United Kingdom) Elaine Surgenor	13 June 1987		1987 Killinchy 150 Races	Sidecar Race (Passenger)	
14	(West Germany) Klaus Klein	15 August 1987	Rusheyhill	1987 Ulster Grand Prix	Formula 1 Race	Bimota - Yamaha
15	(United Kingdom) Steve Johnson	20 June 1992	Ireland's Corner	1992 Ulster Grand Prix	Junior Race	250cc Yamaha
16	(Northern Ireland) Martin Murphy	19 August 1995	Leathemstown	1995 Ulster Grand Prix	Sidecar Race	700cc Yamaha
17	(Republic of Ireland) Steven Galligan	23 August 1997	Rusheyhill	1997 Ulster Grand Prix	Sidecar Race	Yamaha 596
18	(Northern Ireland) Owen McNally	27 August 1999	Dawsons Bend	1999 Ulster Grand Prix	250cc Race	250cc Aprilia
19	(Northern Ireland) Gary Jess	17 August 2002	Deer's Leep	2002 Ulster Grand Prix	Superbike Race	750cc Yamaha
20	(Scotland) Andy Wallace	21 August 2004	Wheeler's Corner	2004 Ulster Grand Prix	Superbike Race	1000cc Suzuki
21	(England) Lee Vernon	9 August 2012	Rock Bends	2012 Dundrod 150	Superbike Race	1000cc BMW
22	(Scotland) Andy Lawson	8 August 2015	Deer's Leep	2015 Ulster Grand Prix	Supersport Race 2	600cc Kawasaki
23	(England) Jamie Hodson	10 August 2017	Joey's Windmill	2017 Dundrod 150	National Race	
24	(England) Gavin Lupton	10 August 2017	Lougher's	2017 Dundrod 150	Challenge Race	
25	(France) Fabrice Miguet	11 August 2018	Joey's Windmill	2018 Ulster Grand Prix	Superstock Race	1000cc Kawasaki

== List of fatal accidents involving race officials ==
No	Official	Date	Place	Series	Race	Role
1	(Northern Ireland) Albert Walter	12 August 1961	Quarry Bends	1961 Ulster Grand Prix	500cc Race	Race Marshall
2	(Northern Ireland) Gerald Allaway	18 August 2001	Race Chicane/Dawsons Bend	2001 Ulster Grand Prix	600cc Race	Flag Marshall

== List of fatal accidents involving spectators ==
No	Name	Date	Place	Series	Race	Role
1	(Northern Ireland) Christopher McConnell-Hewitt	23 August 1997	Rusheyhill	1997 Ulster Grand Prix	Sidecar Race	Spectator

== List of fatal accidents during other events ==
No	Driver	Date	Place	Series	Race	Type
1	(England) Eric Winterbottom	15 Sep 1951	Wheeler's Corner	1951 RAC Tourist Trophy	Feature Race	Frazer-Nash
2	(Scotland) W.T.Smith	17 Sep 1955	Deer's Leap	1955 RAC Tourist Trophy	Feature Race	Connaught AL/SR
3	(United Kingdom) J.C.C.Mayers	17 Sep 1955	Deer's Leap	1955 RAC Tourist Trophy	Feature Race	Cooper - Climax T39
4	(United Kingdom) Richard Manwaring	17 Sep 1955	Tornagrough	1955 RAC Tourist Trophy	Feature Race	Elva - Climax Mk1

== See also ==
- North West 200
- Ulster Grand Prix
- List of Snaefell Mountain Course fatal accidents
