= 2014 Manx Grand Prix =

(Isle of Man) 2014 Manx Grand Prix
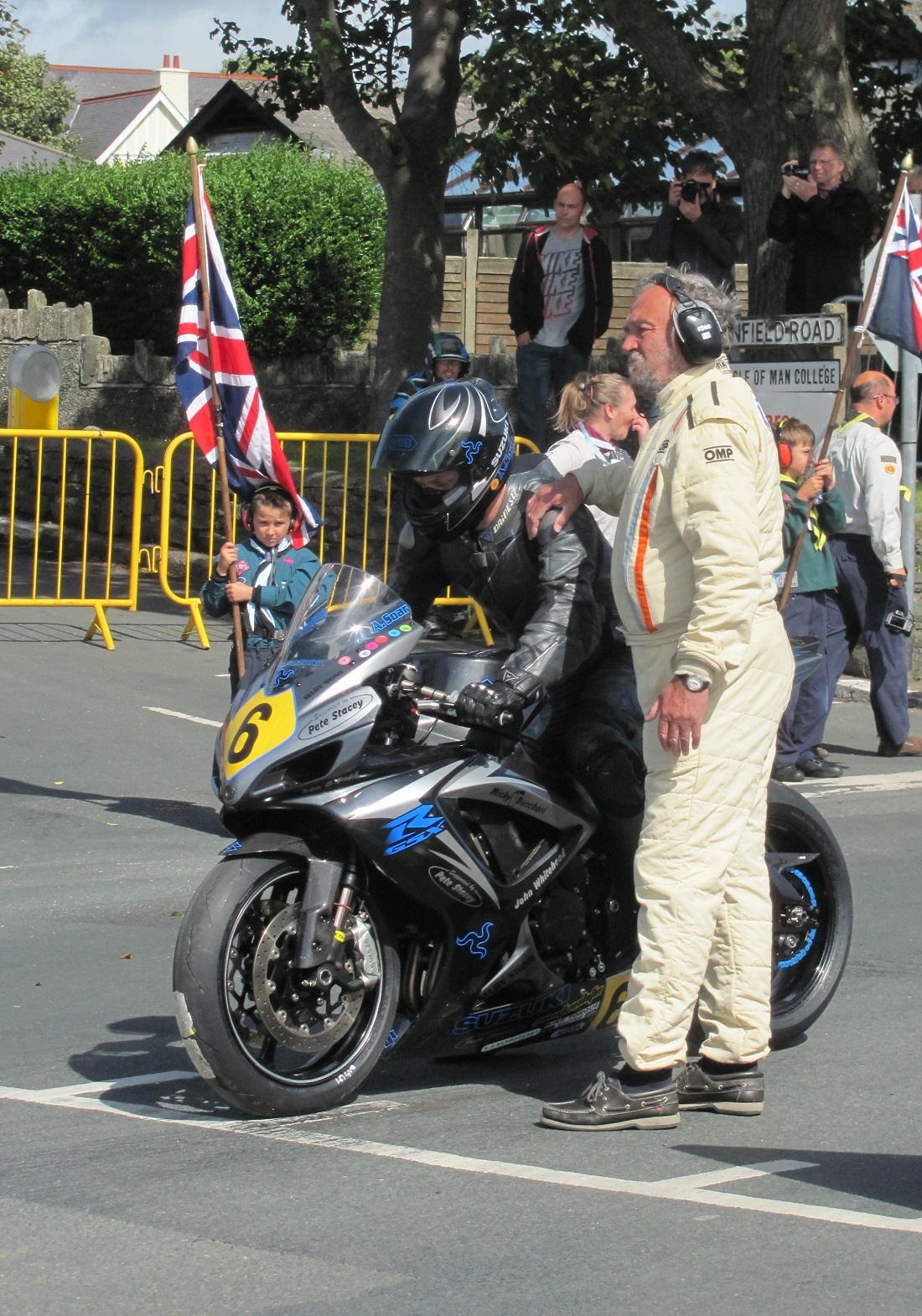
- Andrew Soar (6) 750 cc Suzuki at startline, 2014 Senior Manx Grand Prix, 29 August 2014

Race details
Date	16 August – 29 August 2014
Location	Douglas, Isle of Man
Course	Road Course; 37.73 mi (60.72 km)

2014 Isle of Man Festival of Motorcycling including the Manx Grand Prix and the Classic TT Races were held between Saturday 16 August and Friday 29 August 2014 on the 37.73-mile Mountain Course.
