= School House Corner =

Coordinates: 54°19′15″N 4°23′32″W

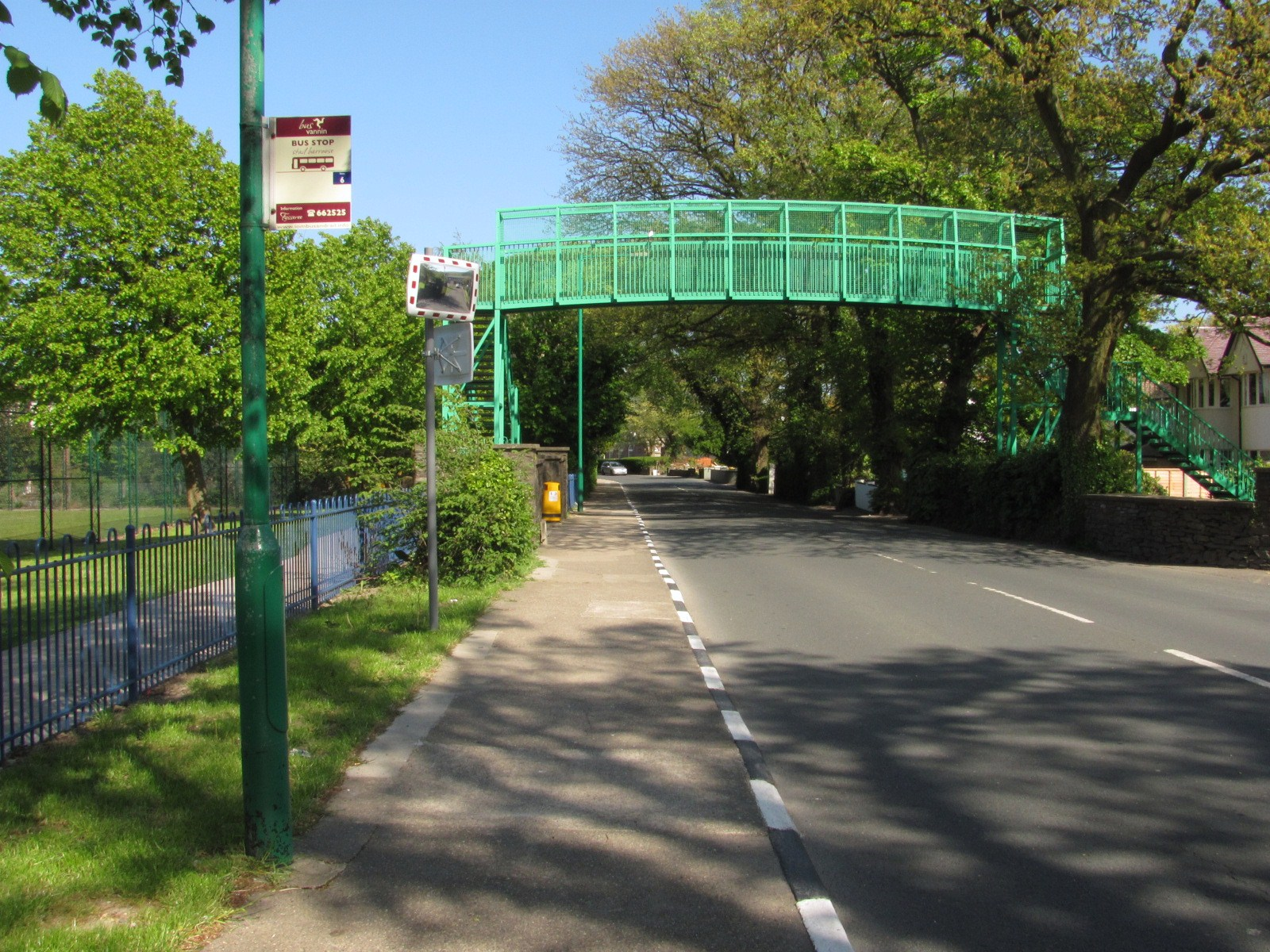
Pedestrian overbridge sited next to Ramsey Grammar School on the A3 Castletown to Ramsey road in Ramsey town with School House Corner beyond in the distance

School House Corner (formerly known as Russell's Corner) is a left curve on the primary A3 Lezayre Road in Ramsey, Isle of Man.

It is between the 23rd and 24th milestone road markers, on the 37.73-mile (60.72 km) circuitous Mountain Course race track, measured from the starting line at the TT Grandstand. The course is used for the Isle of Man TT and Manx Grand Prix races.

It was part of the Four Inch Course used for the Gordon Bennett Trial and Tourist Trophy car races held between 1905 and 1911 and was part of the Snaefell Mountain Course used since 1911 for the TT and Manx Grand Prix races. The name derives from the nearby Ramsey Grammar School and was previously known as Russell's Corner after Benjy Russell, who crashed fatally during the Lightweight race class in the 1947 Manx Grand Prix.
