= 2006 Manx Grand Prix =

2006 amateur motorcycle road race

The 2006 Manx Grand Prix motorcycle races for amateur competitors took place from 28 August to 1 September over the Snaefell Mountain Course. The English rider Craig Atkinson won both the Junior and Senior Grand Prix races.

== Newcomers Race A ==
Monday 28 August 2006 – Mountain Course (4 laps – 150.92 miles)

- Two-stroke motorcycles exceeding 250 cc and not exceeding 750 cc.
- Four-stroke motorcycles exceeding 400 cc and not exceeding 750 cc.
- Twin/three-cylinder motorcycles exceeding 600 cc and not exceeding 1000 cc.

Rank	Rider	Team	Speed	Time
1	(Republic of Ireland) Shane Connor	750 cc Suzuki	114.41 mph	1:19.08.70
2	(Sweden) Mats Nilsson	600 cc Yamaha	112.65	1:20.22.88
3	(Republic of Ireland) Michael Weldon	600 cc Yamaha	110.27	1:22.07.20
4	(Isle of Man) Andy Cowin	600 cc Yamaha	110.23	1:22.08.73
5	(Republic of Ireland) Wayne Kirwan	750 cc Suzuki	109.08	1:22.56.41
6	(England) Kiaran Hanklin	600 cc Honda	108.61	1:23.22.55
7	(France) Erwan Erkelens	750 cc Suzuki	107.49	1:24.14.42
8	(Northern Ireland) Trevor Ferguson	600 cc Kawasaki	107.34	1:24.21.60
9	(Republic of Ireland) Mickey Fitzpatrick	750 cc Suzuki	107.22	1:24.27.45
10	(England) Darren Neal	600 cc Yamaha	105.96	1:25.27.41

== Newcomers Race C ==
Monday 28 August 2006 – Mountain Course (4 laps – 150.92 miles)

- Two-stroke motorcycles exceeding 125 cc and 6 gears.
- Four-stroke motorcycles exceeding 250 cc and not exceeding 400 cc.

Rank	Rider	Team	Speed	Time
1	(Northern Ireland) Michael Dunlop	125 cc Honda	103.78 mph	1:27.15.17
2	(Isle of Man) Daniel Sayle	125 cc Honda	100.74	1:29.53.14
3	(Australia) Ken Onus	400 cc Honda	100.13	1:30.26.28
4	(England) Alistair Howarth	400 cc Yamaha	97.62	1:32.45.75
5	(England) Jason Lamb	400 cc Yamaha	95.78	1:32.45.78
6	(Scotland) John MacFarlane	400 cc Kawasaki	94.17	1:39.09.08
7	(England) Nick Shorter	399 cc Honda	92.13	1:38.17.08
8	(England) Tim Kaley	400 cc Honda	84.02	1:47.46.65

== Senior Classic Race ==
Monday 28 August 2006 – Mountain Course (4 laps – 150.92 miles)

- For motorcycles exceeding 350 cc and not exceeding 500 cc.

Rank	Rider	Team	Speed	Time
1	(England) Chris Palmer	499 cc Manx Norton	105.03 mph	1:26.12.83
2	(England) Steve Linsdell	500 cc BIC Paton	104.66	1:26.31.05
3	(Isle of Man) Derek Whalley	476 cc Aermacchi	103.43	1:27.32.76
4	(England) John Goodall	496 cc G50 Matchless	101.37	1:29.19.80
5	(Isle of Man) Alan Brew	496 cc G50 Seeley	101.20	1:29.28.74
6	(Northern Ireland) Ryan Farquhar	500 cc Manx Norton	101.06	1:29.36.09
7	(England) Dave Hughes	499 cc Manx Norton	100.42	1:30.10.63
8	(England) Stacey Killworth	499 cc Manx Norton	97.8	1:32.35.61
9	(Isle of Man) Tony Cawte	435 cc Drixton Honda	97.72	1:32.40.15
10	(England) Steven Elliot	500 cc Honda	97.50	1:32.52.65

== Junior Classic Race ==
Wednesday 30 August 2006 – Mountain Course (4 laps – 150.92 miles)

- Class A for motorcycles exceeding 300 cc and not exceeding 350 cc.

Rank	Rider	Team	Speed	Time
1	(England) Roy Richardson	348 cc Drixton Honda	99.43 mph	1:31.04.39
2	(Isle of Man) Tony Cawte	349 cc Drixton Honda	98.61	1:31.49.48
3	(England) John Goodall	349 cc 7R AJS	97.71	1:32.40.46
4	(England) Paul Coward	350 cc Honda	96.55	1:33.47.39
5	(Isle of Man) Graham Taubman	350 cc Manx Norton	96.34	1:33.59.24
6	(Northern Ireland) Ryan Farquhar	348 cc Aermacchi	95.97	1:34.21.19
7	(England) Bob Price	350 cc Honda	95.80	1:34.21.27
8	(England) Steven Elliot	350 cc Honda	95.07	1:35.14.99
9	(England) Doug Snow	340 cc Ducati	93.67	1:36.40.55
10	(Scotland) Wattie Brown	350 cc Honda	92.86	1:37.31.11

== Lightweight Classic Race ==
Wednesday 30 August 2006 – Mountain Course (4 laps – 150.92 miles)

- Class B for motorcycles exceeding 175 cc and not exceeding 250 cc.

Rank	Rider	Team	Speed	Time
1	(Northern Ireland) Geoff McMullan	250 cc Suzuki	93.79 mph	1:36.33.05
2	(England) Peter Wakefield	250 cc Suzuki	93.31	1:37.02.08
3	(England) Peter Richardson	247 cc Suzuki	91.51	1:39.20.51
4	(England) David Smith	247 cc Yamaha	91.01	1:39.29.57
5	(England) Jim Weeks	247 cc Suzuki	91.01	1:40.35.97
6	(England) Tom Jackson	247 cc Suzuki	88.16	1:42.42.87
7	(England) Mervyn Stratford	247 cc Greeves Silverstone	85.52	1:45.53.37

== Junior Manx Grand Prix ==
Wednesday 30 August 2006 – Mountain Course (4 laps – 150.92 miles)

- Two-stroke motorcycles exceeding 200 cc and not exceeding 350 cc.
- Four-stroke four-cylinder motorcycles exceeding 450 cc and not exceeding 600 cc.
- Four-stroke twin-cylinder motorcycles exceeding 600 cc and not exceeding 750 cc.

Rank	Rider	Team	Speed	Time
1	(England) Craig Atkinson	600 cc Honda	116.63 mph	1:17.38.62
2	(Republic of Ireland) Derek Brien	600 cc Kawasaki	116.62	1:17.38.63
3	(Northern Ireland) Barry Davidson	600 cc Yamaha	114.48	1:19.01.89
4	(Northern Ireland) Andrew Neill	600 cc Yamaha	114.46	1:19.02.69
5	(England) Mark Castle	600 cc Yamaha	113.99	1:19.26.18
6	(Republic of Ireland) Ryan McCay	600 cc Honda	113.70	1:19.38.54
7	(Northern Ireland) James McCullaugh	600 cc Suzuki	113.51	1:19.46.49
8	(Northern Ireland) Maurice Hogg	600 cc Yamaha	113.42	1:19.50.34
9	(England) Philip McGurk	600 cc Suzuki	113.05	1:20.05.84
10	(Wales) Adam Barclay	600 cc Yamaha	112.57	1:20.26.32

== Lightweight Manx Grand Prix ==
Friday 1 September 2006 – Mountain Course (4 laps – 150.92 miles)

Rank	Rider	Team	Speed	Time
1	(England) Barry Davidson	250 cc Honda	110.36 mph	1:22.03.05
2	(England) Brian Spooner	249 cc Yamaha	110.11	1:22.14.27
3	(England) Stuart Garton	250 cc Honda	107.85	1:23.57.69
4	(Northern Ireland) Brian Mateer	250 cc Yamaha	104.94	1:26.17.24
5	(England) Mark Waddell	250 cc Honda	104.41	1:26.43.65
6	(England) Chris Barrett	250 cc Yamaha	104.01	1:27.03.42
7	(Isle of Man) Andrew Kneale	250 cc Yamaha	102.96	1:27.56.79
8	(England) Neil Cudworth	249 cc Yamaha	101.22	1:29.27.56
9	(England) Thomas Snow	250 cc Yamaha	100.95	1:29.41.89
10	(United Kingdom) Neil Chadwick	250 cc Yamaha	100.72	1:29.54.50

== Senior Manx Grand Prix ==
Friday 1 September 2006 – Mountain Course (4 laps – 150.92 miles)

- Four-stroke four-cylinder motorcycles exceeding 450 cc and not exceeding 750 cc.
- Four-stroke twin-cylinder motorcycles exceeding 600 cc and not exceeding 1000 cc.

Rank	Rider	Team	Speed	Time
1	(England) Craig Atkinson	750 cc Suzuki	116.27 mph	1:17.52.85
2	(Republic of Ireland) Derek Brien	600 cc Kawasaki	115.53	1:18.22.60
3	(Isle of Man) Steve Oates	750 cc Suzuki	114.41	1:19.08.64
4	(Republic of Ireland) Shane Connor	750 cc Suzuki	113.88	1:19.31.09
5	(Wales) Adam Barclay	750 cc Suzuki	113.63	1:19.41.43
6	(Northern Ireland) Andrew Neill	600 cc Kawasaki	113.28	1:19.56.29
7	(Northern Ireland) Maurice Hogg	600 cc Yamaha	113.14	1:20.02.09
8	(Northern Ireland) James McCullough	600 cc Suzuki	113.09	1:20.04.12
9	(Isle of Man) Glynn Jones	600 cc Yamaha	112.30	1:20.38.16
10	(England) Scott Wilson	750 cc Suzuki	112.19	1:20.42.78
