= Ballaspur =

Coordinates: 54°12′19″N 4°37′42″W

Ballaspur (Manx: farm of the spur, Rock Farm) is situated between the 7th and 8th Milestone road-side markers on the Snaefell Mountain Course used for the Isle of Man TT races on the A3 Castletown to Ramsey road in the parish of German in the Isle of Man.

Ballaspur has become known for the spectacular crash of Manxman Richard 'Milky' Quayle in 2003 who caught the roadside to the left, impacting heavily to the right after losing control at high speed.

Ballaspur was part of the Highland Course and Four Inch Course used for the Gordon Bennett Trial and Tourist Trophy car races held between 1904 and 1922. It was part of the St. John's Short Course used between 1907 and 1910 and part of the Snaefell Mountain Course used since 1911 for the TT races and 1923 for the Manx Grand Prix.

The surrounding areas are mainly farmland with nearby summits of Beary Mountain at 1,020 feet (311 m), Greeba Mountain at 1,385 feet (422 m) and Slieau Whallian at 1,093 feet (333 m).
