= Alpine Cottage =

Landmark on the Isle of Man

Coordinates: 54°18′23″N 4°33′26″W

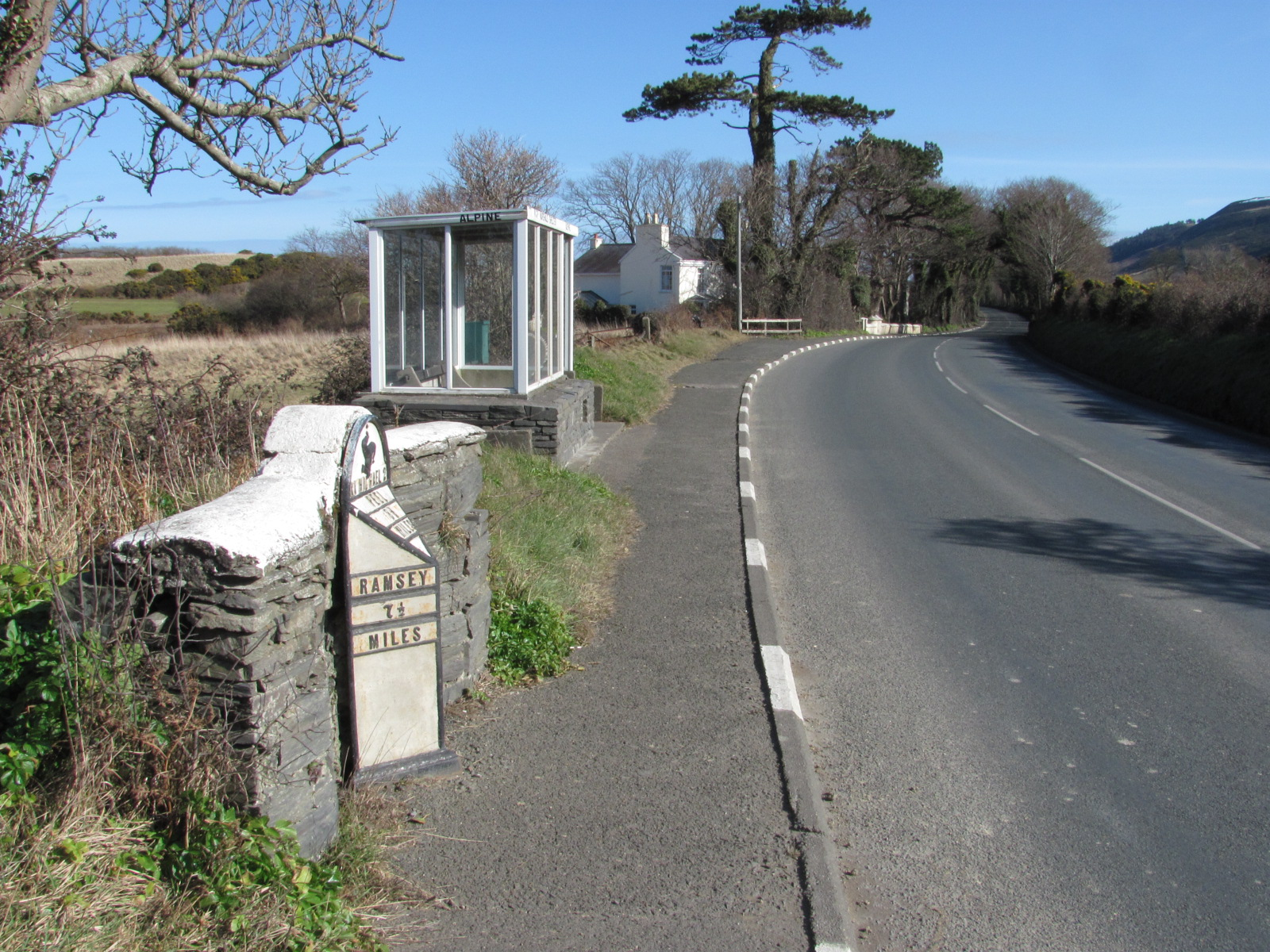
The A3 Castletown to Ramsey road at Alpine Cottage, TT Marshals' Shelter and nearby Alpine House

Alpine Cottage (Manx: Ballacurnkeil or the Narrow or small Ballacurn) including the adjacent Alpine House is situated between the 16th and 17th Milestone road-side markers on the Snaefell Mountain Course on the primary A3 Castletown to Ramsey road in the parish of Ballaugh in the Isle of Man.

Alpine Cottage and nearby Ballaugh Bridge were part of the Highland Course and Four Inch Course used for the Gordon Bennett Trial and Tourist Trophy car races held in the Isle of Man between 1904 and 1922. Alpine Cottage is part of the Snaefell Mountain Course used since 1911 for the Isle of Man TT and from 1923 for the Manx Grand Prix races.
