= Appledene =

Coordinates: 54°11′33″N 4°35′47″W

Appledene is situated between the 6th and 7th roadside mile-markers, measured from the startline of the Snaefell Mountain Course used for the Isle of Man TT races, on the primary A1 Douglas to Peel road in the Isle of Man parish of German.

Appledene was part of the Four Inch Course used for the Tourist Trophy car races held between 1905 and 1922, and part of the course used for 1905 International Motor-Cycle Cup Races. It is part of the Mountain Course used since 1911 for the TT from 1923 for the Manx Grand Prix races.

Before the start of racing for the 1953 Manx Grand Prix, the cottage at Appledene corner on the A1 road was demolished.
