= 2011 Manx Grand Prix =

(Isle of Man) 2011 Manx Grand Prix
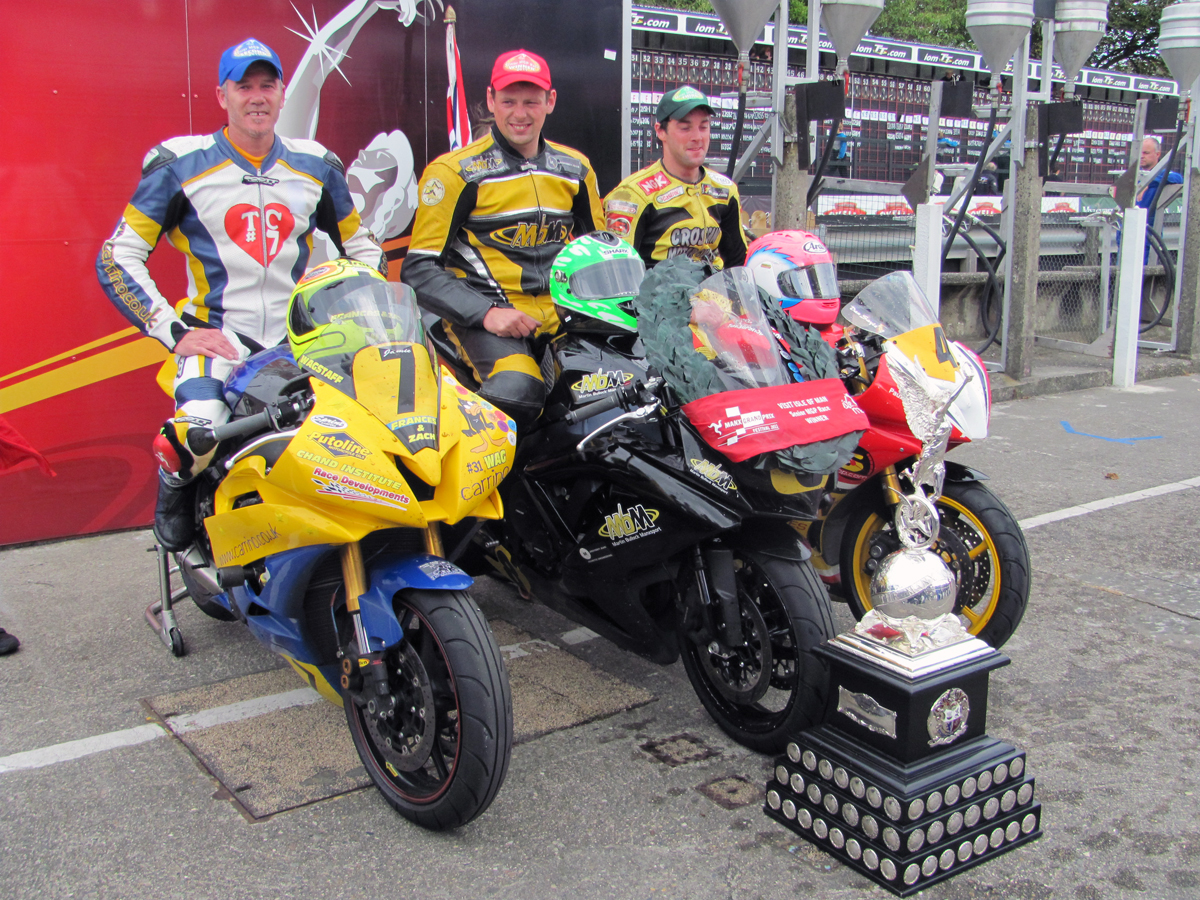
- Senior 2011 Manx Grand Prix Presentation TT Grandstand.

Race details
Date	20 August – 2 September 2011
Location	Douglas, Isle of Man
Course	Road Course; 37.733 mi (60.725 km)

The 2011 Manx Grand Prix Festival were held between Saturday 20 August and Friday 2 September 2011 on the 37.733-mile Mountain Course.

The Blue Riband event of the Manx Grand Prix Race week was won by Andrew Brady after victory in the 2011 Senior Manx Grand Prix at an average speed of 113.788 mph and also completing an important double after winning the Junior Manx Grand Prix held in poor weather conditions. The 3 lap (113.00 miles) Newcomers Race was won by Wayne Hamilton at an average speed of 112.022 mph and Gavin Lupton winning the 400 cc Class B Newcomers race. The Isle of Man TT competitor Ryan Farquhar completed a hattrick of victories after winning the 350 cc Junior Classic Race, the 500 cc Classic Race riding a 499 cc Paton and the Classic Superbike Race. The 250 cc Lightweight Classic Race was won by Barry Davidson and the Junior Classic Race by Roy Richardson raising his tally to 9 victories in the Manx Grand Prix. The Formula Classic Race was won by Mark Parrett the only finisher in the class from 4 starters. The combined 650 cc Supertwin/Lightweight Race proved to be a double win for local Isle of Man competitors with Dave Moffitt winning the inaugural Supertwin Race and Billy Smith the 400 cc Lightweight Race. The 2010 Lightweight Manx Grand Prix winner Neil Kent crashed fatally at Greeba Bridge during practice for the Manx Grand Prix. After winning the 2011 Newcomers Race, Wayne Hamilton died in an accident at the 13th Milestone while in 3rd place of the 2011 Junior Manx Grand Prix and the veteran competitor Adam Easton crashed fatally at Lambfell Cottage during the 500 cc Classic Race.

A revised race format for the 2011 Manx Grand Prix with the introduction of a new 650 cc Super-Twin race and the reworking of the Classic Bike racing regulations by the race organisers, the Manx Motor-Cycle Club Committee (MMCC) and the Isle of Man Department of Community, Culture & Leisure. Improvements to the race structure include increased competitor safety with each race limited to a maximum of 90 entries. The practice of competitors starting in 'pairs' has been abandoned for the Isle of Man TT race practice of riders starting singly at 10 second intervals.

== Practice Times ==
=== 2011 Senior Manx Grand Prix Practice Times & Leaderboard ===
- Plates; Black on Yellow.

Rank	Rider	Sat 20 Aug	Mon 22 Aug	Tues 23 Aug	Wed 24 Aug	Thurs 25 Aug	Fri 26 Aug	Sat 27 Aug	Mon 29 Aug	Wed 31 Aug
1	(Northern Ireland) Shaun Anderson; 750 cc Suzuki	Cancelled; No Time	—— No Time	Cancelled; No Time	—— No Time	—— No Time	19' 24.55; 116.636 mph	19' 24.82; 116.608 mph	19' 29.79; 116.113 mph	20' 08.73; 112.372 mph
2	(England) Jamie Coward; 600 cc Suzuki	Cancelled; No Time	20' 25.35; 110.849 mph	Cancelled; No Time	19' 41.41; 114.971 mph	21' 37.14; 104.713 mph	19' 25.34; 116.556 mph	19' 38.09; 115.295 mph	—— No Time	19' 56.67; 113.505 mph
3	(Republic of Ireland) Michael Sweeney; 600 cc Yamaha	Cancelled; No Time	30' 08.59; 75.102 mph	Cancelled; No Time	19' 58.63; 113.320 mph	25' 46.46; 87.831 mph	19' 26.86; 116.405 mph	20' 26.38; 110.775 mph	—— No Time	20' 27.47; 110.657 mph
4	(England) Grant Wagstaff; 599 cc Yamaha	Cancelled; No Time	20' 20.54; 111.285 mph	Cancelled; No Time	20' 07.24; 112.511 mph	20' 23.64; 112.511 mph	19' 30.70; 116.023 mph	19' 44.57; 114.664 mph	—— No Time	20' 00.83; 113.112 mph
5	(Northern Ireland) Stephen McKnight; 599 cc Yamaha	Cancelled; No Time	20' 39.32; 110.599 mph	Cancelled; No Time	20' 12.61; 112.013 mph	21' 25.68; 105.647 mph	19' 45.19; 114.604 mph	20' 01.96; 113.005 mph	—— No Time	21' 20.87; 106.043 mph
6	(England) Andrew Farrell; 750 cc Suzuki	Cancelled; No Time	—— No Time	Cancelled; No Time	20' 12.13; 112.057 mph	—— No Time	19' 47.29; 114.402 mph	—— No Time	—— No Time	20' 31.04; 110.336 mph
7	(England) Andrew Brady; 750 cc Suzuki	Cancelled; No Time	—— No Time	Cancelled; No Time	19' 52.95; 113.859 mph	—— No Time	20' 12.29; 112.043 mph	—— No Time	—— No Time	—— No Time
8	(Isle of Man) Dan Sayle; 600 cc Yamaha	Cancelled; No Time	20' 22.05; 111.148 mph	Cancelled; No Time	19' 56.16; 113.553 mph	—— No Time	20' 05.48; 112.676 mph	19' 57.86; 113.393 mph	—— No Time	21' 32.88; 105.059 mph
9	(England) Peter Symes; 750 cc Suzuki	Cancelled; No Time	20' 19.20; 111.407 mph	Cancelled; No Time	20' 26.19; 110.773 mph	21' 10.29; 106.927 mph	19' 47.41; 114.390 mph	21' 00.84; 107.729 mph	—— No Time	—— No Time
10	(Isle of Man) Paul Smyth; 600 cc Yamaha	Cancelled; No Time	20' 07.69; 112.470 mph	Cancelled; No Time	19' 59.73; 113.216 mph	20' 45.61; 109.046 mph	19' 49.75; 114.165 mph	—— No Time	—— No Time	22' 38.84; 99.959 mph
11	(Republic of Ireland) David Lumsden; 600 cc Honda	Cancelled; No Time	—— No Time	Cancelled; No Time	—— No Time	22' 57.97; 98.571 mph	19' 52.05; 113.945 mph	19' 49.24; 114.214 mph	—— No Time	20' 17.54; 111.559 mph
12	(Isle of Man) Glyn Jones; 750 cc Suzuki	Cancelled; No Time	22' 27.46; 110.599 mph	Cancelled; No Time	20' 25.71; 110.816 mph	—— No Time	19' 58.97; 113.287 mph	—— No Time	20' 36.12; 109.882 mph	20' 28.42; 110.572 mph
13	(England) Alan Jackson; 600 cc Moriwaki	Cancelled; No Time	20' 19.20; 111.407 mph	Cancelled; No Time	20' 28.26; 110.586 mph	22' 42.32; 99.703 mph	20' 02.31; 112.972 mph	20' 32.00; 110.250 mph	—— No Time	21' 20.41; 106.082 mph
14	(Northern Ireland) Denis Booth; 750 cc Suzuki	Cancelled; No Time	—— No Time	Cancelled; No Time	20' 32.64; 110.193 mph	22' 17.82; 101.530 mph	20' 05.90; 112.637 mph	—— No Time	20' 34.18; 110.055 mph	20' 47.59; 108.872 mph
15	(England) Mike Minns; 600 cc Yamaha	Cancelled; No Time	20' 32.78; 110.180 mph	Cancelled; No Time	19' 59.65; 113.223 mph	—— No Time	20' 07.75; 112.464 mph	20' 38.77; 109.648 mph	—— No Time	21' 40.19; 104.468 mph
16	(Northern Ireland) David Mulligan; 600 cc Yamaha	Cancelled; No Time	21' 03.70; 107.485 mph	Cancelled; No Time	21' 52.22; 108.470 mph	22' 18.50; 101.478 mph	20' 15.18; 111.776 mph	20' 08.30; 112.412 mph	—— No Time	—— No Time
17	(Isle of Man) Dave Moffitt; 599 cc Yamaha	Cancelled; No Time	—— No Time	Cancelled; No Time	20' 16.34; 111.670 mph	22' 12.88; 111.678 mph	—— No Time	—— No Time	—— No Time	—— No Time
18	(Isle of Man) Jonny Heginbotham; 750 cc Suzuki	Cancelled; No Time	20' 39.32; 110.599 mph	Cancelled; No Time	20' 16.25; 111.678 mph	—— No Time	—— No Time	—— No Time	—— No Time	—— No Time
19	(Isle of Man) Billy Smith; 600 cc Yamaha	Cancelled; No Time	20' 19.70; 111.354 mph	Cancelled; No Time	20' 21.13; 111.231 mph	24' 52.53; 91.005 mph	—— No Time	20' 23.97; 110.983 mph	—— No Time	—— No Time
20	(England) Dave Milling; 998 cc Aprilia	Cancelled; No Time	20' 25.05; 110.875 mph	Cancelled; No Time	21' 26.71; 105.562 mph	23' 08.93; 97.793 mph	20' 51.70; 108.515 mph	—— No Time	—— No Time	22' 30.00; 100.613 mph

=== 2011 Junior Manx Grand Prix Practice Times & Leaderboard ===
- Plates; White numbers on Blue.

Rank	Rider	Sat 20 Aug	Mon 22 Aug	Tues 23 Aug	Wed 24 Aug	Thurs 25 Aug	Fri 26 Aug
1	(England) Jamie Coward; 600 cc Suzuki	Cancelled; No Time	20' 25.35; 110.849 mph	Cancelled; No Time	19' 41.41; 114.971 mph	21' 37.14; 104.713 mph	19' 25.34; 116.556 mph
2	(Republic of Ireland) Michael Sweeney; 600 cc Yamaha	Cancelled; No Time	30' 08.59; 75.102 mph	Cancelled; No Time	19' 58.63; 113.320 mph	25' 46.46; 87.831 mph	19' 26.86; 116.405 mph
3	(England) Grant Wagstaff; 599 cc Yamaha	Cancelled; No Time	20' 20.54; 111.285 mph	Cancelled; No Time	20' 07.24; 112.511 mph	20' 23.64; 112.511 mph	19' 30.70; 116.023 mph
4	(Northern Ireland) Stephen McKnight; 599 cc Yamaha	Cancelled; No Time	20' 39.32; 110.599 mph	Cancelled; No Time	20' 12.61; 112.013 mph	21' 25.68; 105.647 mph	19' 45.19; 114.604 mph
5	(England) Andrew Brady; 599 cc Honda	Cancelled; No Time	20' 35.58; 109.930 mph	Cancelled; No Time	19' 52.95; 113.859 mph	—— No Time	20' 12.29; 112.043 mph
6	(Isle of Man) Paul Smyth; 600 cc Yamaha	Cancelled; No Time	20' 07.69; 112.470 mph	Cancelled; No Time	19' 59.73; 113.216 mph	20' 45.61; 109.046 mph	19' 49.75; 114.165 mph
7	(Republic of Ireland) David Lumsden; 600 cc Honda	Cancelled; No Time	—— No Time	Cancelled; No Time	—— No Time	22' 57.97; 98.571 mph	19' 52.05; 113.945 mph
8	(Isle of Man) Andy Fenton; 600 cc Yamaha	Cancelled; No Time	19' 52.86; 113.868 mph	Cancelled; No Time	—— No Time	—— No Time	—— No Time
9	(Isle of Man) Dan Sayle; 600 cc Yamaha	Cancelled; No Time	20' 22.05; 111.148 mph	Cancelled; No Time	19' 56.16; 113.553 mph	—— No Time	20' 05.48; 112.676 mph
10	(England) Mike Minns; 600 cc Yamaha	Cancelled; No Time	20' 32.78; 110.180 mph	Cancelled; No Time	19' 59.65; 113.223 mph	—— No Time	20' 07.75; 112.464 mph

=== 2011 Junior Classic Practice Times and Leaderboard ===
- Plates; Black digits on White race plates.
- Class A Classic Machines 300 cc–350 cc

Rank	Rider	Sat 20 Aug	Mon 22 Aug	Tues 23 Aug	Wed 24 Aug	Thurs 25 Aug	Fri 26 Aug
1	(England) Chris Palmer; 349 cc Honda	Cancelled; No Time	22' 34.57; 100.274 mph	Cancelled; No Time	22' 36.96; 100.097 mph	23' 24.73; 96.693 mph	—— No Time
2	(Northern Ireland) Ryan Farquhar; 349 cc Honda	Cancelled; No Time	—— No Time	Cancelled; No Time	—— No Time	—— No Time	22' 47.42; 99.332 mph
3	(England) Bill Swallow; 348 cc AJS	Cancelled; No Time	23' 34.06; 96.055 mph	Cancelled; No Time	22' 50.05; 99.141 mph	24' 31.87; 92.282 mph	—— No Time
4	(England) Roy Richardson; 349 cc Aermacchi	Cancelled; No Time	23' 23.27; 96.794 mph	Cancelled; No Time	—— No Time	—— No Time	—— No Time
5	(Northern Ireland) Nigel Moore; 348 cc Honda	Cancelled; No Time	23' 34.06; 96.055 mph	Cancelled; No Time	—— No Time	—— No Time	23' 55.94; 94.592 mph
6	(England) Mark Herbertson; 348 cc AJS	Cancelled; No Time	—— No Time	Cancelled; No Time	23' 47.31; 95.163 mph	—— No Time	—— No Time
7	(England) Bob Price; 350 cc Honda	Cancelled; No Time	25' 36.97; 88.374 mph	Cancelled; No Time	24' 08.68; 93.760 mph	—— No Time	24' 10.74; 93.627 mph
8	(Scotland) Derek Glass; 346 cc Honda	Cancelled; No Time	25' 36.97; 88.374 mph	Cancelled; No Time	24' 56.24; 90.780 mph	—— No Time	24' 10.74; 93.627 mph
9	(England) Chris McGahan; 346 cc Honda	Cancelled; No Time	32' 25.72; 69.809 mph	Cancelled; No Time	—— No Time	—— No Time	24' 10.91; 93.616 mph
10	(Northern Ireland) Davy Morgan; 350 cc Honda	Cancelled; No Time	24' 28.66; 92.484 mph	Cancelled; No Time	—— No Time	—— No Time	24' 14.522; 93.383 mph

=== 2011 500 cc Classic Practice Times and Leaderboard ===
- Plates; White digits on Black race plates.
- Classic Machines 351 cc–500 cc

Rank	Rider	Sat 20 Aug	Mon 22 Aug	Tues 23 Aug	Wed 24 Aug	Thurs 25 Aug	Fri 26 Aug
1	(Northern Ireland) Ryan Farquhar; 499 cc Paton	Cancelled; No Time	—— No Time	Cancelled; No Time	21' 52.37; 103.498 mph	—— No Time	—— No Time
2	(England) Chris Palmer; 498 cc Matchless	Cancelled; No Time	—— No Time	Cancelled; No Time	22' 04.98; 102.514 mph	—— No Time	22' 09.81; 102.141 mph
3	(Scotland) Wattie Brown; 498 cc Manx Petty	Cancelled; No Time	23' 15.47; 97.335 mph	Cancelled; No Time	22' 26.03; 100.910 mph	—— No Time	—— No Time
4	(England) Steve Linsdell; 497 cc Royal Enfield	Cancelled; No Time	22' 56.88; 98.649 mph	Cancelled; No Time	22' 37.19; 100.081 mph	—— No Time	23' 52.15; 94.842 mph
5	(England) Paul Coward; 498 cc Nourish	Cancelled; No Time	23' 04.53; 98.104 mph	Cancelled; No Time	22' 47.52; 99.325 mph	23' 30.79; 96.278 mph	22' 47.52; 99.325 mph
6	(Wales) Meredydd Owen; 498 cc Seeley MkII	Cancelled; No Time	—— No Time	Cancelled; No Time	22' 51.50; 99.036 mph	24' 07.89; 93.811 mph	—— No Time
7	(Wales) Bob Owen; 500 cc Seeley G50	Cancelled; No Time	23' 40.07; 95.649 mph	Cancelled; No Time	22' 52.41; 98.971 mph	24' 38.69; 91.857 mph	23' 14.13; 97.429 mph
8	(Isle of Man) Allan Brew; 496 cc Seeley	Cancelled; No Time	—— No Time	Cancelled; No Time	22' 58.29; 98.548 mph	—— No Time	24' 14.522; 93.383 mph
9	(England) Mark Herbertson; 500 cc Matchless	Cancelled; No Time	22' 58.70; 98.519 mph	Cancelled; No Time	22' 51.50; 99.036 mph	—— No Time	23' 14.13; 97.429 mph
10	(England) Stuart Garton; 499 BSA	Cancelled; No Time	—— No Time	Cancelled; No Time	22' 51.50; 99.036 mph	—— No Time	23' 37.84; 95.800 mph

=== 2011 Supertwin Practice Times and Leaderboard ===
- Plates; White digits on Green race plates.
- Machines 201 cc–650 cc

Rank	Rider	Sat 20 Aug	Mon 22 Aug	Tues 23 Aug	Wed 24 Aug	Thurs 25 Aug	Fri 26 Aug
1	(England) Phillip McGurk; 650 cc Springcourt	Cancelled; No Time	—— No Time	Cancelled; No Time	—— No Time	23' 06.85; 97.940 mph	20' 25.07; 110.974 mph
2	(Isle of Man) Dave Moffitt; 649 cc Suzuki	Cancelled; No Time	21' 07.69; 107.146 mph	Cancelled; No Time	21' 11.33; 106.839 mph	23' 05.13; 98.061 mph	20' 36.50; 109.849 mph
3	(Northern Ireland) Wayne Hamilton; 650 cc Kawasaki	Cancelled; No Time	22' 09.30; 102.180 mph	Cancelled; No Time	—— No Time	22' 36.69; 100.117 mph	20' 41.34; 109.420 mph
4	(Northern Ireland) Shaun Anderson; 650 cc Kawasaki	Cancelled; No Time	21' 26.67; 105.566 mph	Cancelled; No Time	21' 24.40; 105.752 mph	—— No Time	20' 41.67; 109.392 mph
5	(Northern Ireland) Joe Phillips; 650 cc Yamasaki	Cancelled; No Time	20' 42.56; 109.313 mph	Cancelled; No Time	21' 04.17; 107.444 mph	—— No Time	22' 47.52; 99.325 mph
6	(Scotland) Rab Davie; 650 cc Kawasaki	Cancelled; No Time	—— No Time	Cancelled; No Time	21' 13.15; 106.686 mph	24' 07.89; 93.811 mph	21' 01.63; 107.661 mph
7	(Isle of Man) Lee Derbyshire; 650 cc Kawasaki	Cancelled; No Time	21' 45.75; 104.023 mph	Cancelled; No Time	21' 31.82; 105.145 mph	25' 05.49; 90.222 mph	21' 08.08; 107.113 mph
8	(Isle of Man) Jonny Heginbotham; 650 cc Kawasaki	Cancelled; No Time	21' 55.42; 103.259 mph	Cancelled; No Time	—— No Time	—— No Time	21' 08.50; 107.078 mph
9	(England) Phil Harvey; 250 cc Honda	Cancelled; No Time	26' 14.72; 86.255 mph	Cancelled; No Time	—— No Time	22' 51.42; 99.042 mph	21' 10.76; 106.888 mph
10	(England) Mike Minns; 650 cc Suzuki	Cancelled; No Time	22' 37.01; 100.094 mph	Cancelled; No Time	22' 51.50; 99.036 mph	25' 17.63; 89.500 mph	21' 12.85; 106.712 mph

=== 2011 Lightweight Practice Times & Leaderboard ===
- Plates; White digits on Green race plates.
- Machines 201 cc–400 cc

Rank	Rider	Sat 20 Aug	Mon 22 Aug	Tues 23 Aug	Wed 24 Aug	Thurs 25 Aug	Fri 26 Aug
1	(Isle of Man) Billy Smith; 400 cc Yamaha	Cancelled; No Time	22' 07.97; 102.282 mph	Cancelled; No Time	21' 15.94; 106.453 mph	—— No Time	—— No Time
2	(England) Alistair Howarth; 400 cc Yamaha	Cancelled; No Time	21' 33.67; 104.994 mph	Cancelled; No Time	23' 26.05; 96.603 mph	23' 11.42; 97.618 mph	21' 57.96; 103.060 mph
3	(England) Ross Johnson; 400 cc Kawasaki	Cancelled; No Time	22' 16.82; 101.605 mph	Cancelled; No Time	21' 41.87; 104.333 mph	—— No Time	—— No Time
4	(Isle of Man) Andy Cowin; 400 cc Yamaha	Cancelled; No Time	—— No Time	Cancelled; No Time	21' 41.94; 104.328 mph	23' 59.78; 94.340 mph	—— No Time
5	(Isle of Man) Peter Simpson; 400 cc Yamaha	Cancelled; No Time	22' 41.28; 99.779 mph	Cancelled; No Time	21' 55.87; 103.223 mph	—— No Time	22' 08.54; 102.239 mph
6	(England) Daniel Millard; 400 cc Kawasaki	Cancelled; No Time	22' 14.83; 101.757 mph	Cancelled; No Time	21' 57.12; 103.125 mph	—— No Time	21' 56.27; 103.192 mph
7	(England) Mike Carter; 400 cc Honda	Cancelled; No Time	22' 42.22; 99.710 mph	Cancelled; No Time	22' 04.24; 102.571 mph	24' 58.74; 90.628 mph	22' 35.46; 100.208 mph
8	(Isle of Man) Adam Jones; 400 cc Kawasaki	Cancelled; No Time	23' 14.29; 97.4117 mph	Cancelled; No Time	22' 06.53; 102.393 mph	23' 46.85; 95.194 mph	—— No Time
9	(Isle of Man) Brian Purdy; 399 cc Honda	Cancelled; No Time	22' 14.85; 101.755 mph	Cancelled; No Time	—— No Time	—— No Time	—— No Time
10	(Republic of Ireland) Dave Yeomans; 400 cc Kawasaki	Cancelled; No Time	23' 05.57; 98.030 mph	Cancelled; No Time	22' 51.50; 99.036 mph	—— No Time	22' 48.97; 99.219 mph

=== 2011 Classic Superbike Practice Times and Leaderboard ===
- Plates; Black digits on orange race plates.
- Classic Machines 351 cc–500 cc

Rank	Rider	Sat 20 Aug	Mon 22 Aug	Tues 23 Aug	Wed 24 Aug	Thurs 25 Aug	Fri 26 Aug	Sat 27 Aug	Mon 29 Aug	Wed 31 Aug
1	(Scotland) Mark Buckley; XR69 Suzuki	Cancelled; No Time	20' 07.51; 102.514 mph	Cancelled; No Time	19' 47.46; 112.486 mph	22' 22.83; 101.151 mph	19' 50.93; 114.052 mph	—— No Time	—— No Time	21' 06.37; 107.258 mph
2	(Northern Ireland) Ryan Farquhar; 1016 cc Suzuki	Cancelled; No Time	19' 56.56; 113.516 mph	Cancelled; No Time	—— No Time	24' 41.97; 91.654 mph	—— No Time	—— No Time	—— No Time	20' 33.70; 110.098 mph
3	(Northern Ireland) Michael Dunlop; 997 cc Suzuki	Cancelled; No Time	—— No Time	Cancelled; No Time	20' 27.49; 110.665 mph	22' 19.13; 101.430 mph	20' 02.25; 112.978 mph	—— No Time	—— No Time	—— No Time
4	(Isle of Man) John Barton; 750 cc Suzuki	Cancelled; No Time	—— No Time	Cancelled; No Time	21' 19.56; 106.152 mph	23' 03.98; 98.143 mph	21' 17.55; 106.319 mph	—— No Time	—— No Time	22' 17.32; 101.567 mph
5	(Isle of Man) Chris McGahan; 850 cc BSA	Cancelled; No Time	—— No Time	Cancelled; No Time	22' 25.12; 100.978 mph	—— No Time	21' 30.07; 105.287 mph	22' 29.88; 100.622 mph	22' 17.11; 101.583 mph	22' 52.89; 98.936 mph
6	(England) Maria Costello; 997 cc Suzuki	Cancelled; No Time	—— No Time	Cancelled; No Time	22' 23.29; 101.116 mph	—— No Time	21' 37.49; 104.685 mph	—— No Time	—— No Time	21' 51.58; 103.560 mph
7	(England) Andy Lovett; 750 cc Suzuki	Cancelled; No Time	21' 40.81; 104.418 mph	Cancelled; No Time	23' 52.67; 94.807 mph	23' 56.90; 94.528 mph	22' 00.18; 102.886 mph	—— No Time	22' 41.80; 99.742 mph	—— No Time
8	(England) Ken Davis; 749 cc Yamaha	Cancelled; No Time	—— No Time	Cancelled; No Time	22' 21.49; 101.252 mph	—— No Time	22' 04.00; 102.589 mph	—— No Time	—— No Time	22' 38.83; 99.960 mph
9	(England) Alec Whitewell; 750 cc Suzuki	Cancelled; No Time	—— No Time	Cancelled; No Time	23' 13.89; 97.445 mph	—— No Time	22' 13.95; 101.824 mph	—— No Time	—— No Time	23' 37.82; 95.800 mph
10	(England) Mick Godfrey; 997 cc Suzuki	Cancelled; No Time	23' 08.12; 97.850 mph	Cancelled; No Time	—— No Time	22' 19.13; 101.430 mph	23' 11.10; 97.641 mph	—— No Time	—— No Time	23' 32.30; 96.175 mph

== Race results ==
=== Race 1a; Newcomers Race 'A' ===
Saturday 27 August 2011 Mountain Course 3 laps – 113.00 miles

- Class A
- 550 cc–750 cc Four-stroke Four-cylinder motorcycles.
- 651 cc–1000 cc Four-stroke Twin-cylinder motorcycles.
- 601 cc–675 cc Four-stroke Three-cylinder motorcycles.
- 601 cc–1000 cc Rotary motorcycles.
- 201 cc–450 cc Two-stroke Twin-cylinder motorcycles

Rank	Rider	Team	Speed	Time
1	(Northern Ireland) Wayne Hamilton	600 cc Yamaha	112.022 mph	1:00.37.55
2	(Northern Ireland) William Davison	600 cc Honda	111.396 mph	1:00.57.96
3	(Isle of Man) David Kennington	600 cc Honda	110.369 mph	1:01.32.02
4	(England) Karl Foster	600 cc Yamaha	107.527 mph	1:03.09.59
5	(England) Daniel Frear	600 cc Yamaha	106.034 mph	1:04.02.95
6	(Scotland) Tony Wilson	600 cc Yamaha	105.986 mph	1:04.04.70
7	(Northern Ireland) William Cowden	600 cc Suzuki	105.323 mph	1:04.28.89
8	(Portugal) Nuno Caetano	600 cc Kawasaki	105.265 mph	1:04.31.04
9	(England) Stuart Hall	600 cc Honda	104.625 mph	1:04.54.72
10	(England) Peter Bradshaw	600 cc Honda	104.373 mph	1:05.04.13

Fastest Lap: William Davidson – 114.351 mph (19' 47.81)

=== Race 1a; Newcomers Race 'B' ===
Saturday 27 August 2011 Mountain Course 3 laps – 113.00 miles (182.16 km)

- Class B
- Up to 125 cc Two-stroke Single-cylinder motorcycles 6 gears maximum.
- 251 cc–400 cc Four-stroke Four-cylinder motorcycles.
- Up to 650 cc Four-stroke Twin-cylinder motorcycles.

Rank	Rider	Team	Speed	Time
1	(England) Gavin Lupton	400 cc Honda	99.932 mph	1:07.57.60
2	(England) Scott Smyth	399 cc Honda	99.425 mph	1:08.18.39
3	(England) Wayne Axon	650 cc Suzuki	98.942 mph	1:08.38.40
4	(England) Anthony Porter	650 cc Suzuki	98.261 mph	1:09.06.97
5	(United States) Travis McNerney	645 cc Suzuki	97.351 mph	1:09.45.71
6	(England) Richard Rowe	650 cc Suzuki	97.264 mph	1:09.49.47
7	(Scotland) Vic Allan	398 cc Kawasaki	96.316 mph	1:10.30.68
8	(Isle of Man) Stuart Osborne	399 cc Yamaha	94.527 mph	1:11.50.78
9	(Wales) Hefyn Owen	650 cc Suzuki	92.087 mph	1:13.45.01
10	(Scotland) Bobby McMullen	400 cc Kawasaki	91.810 mph	1:13.58.35

Fastest Lap: Anthony Porter – 101.197 mph (22' 22.22)

=== Race 2a; 350 cc Junior Classic Race ===
Monday 29 August 2011 Mountain Course 4 laps – 150.92 miles (242.80 km)

- For motorcycles exceeding 300 cc and not exceeding 351 cc

Rank	Rider	Team	Speed	Time
1	(Northern Ireland) Ryan Farquhar	349 cc Honda	97.787 mph	1:32.36.10
2	(England) Chris Palmer	349 cc Honda	97.035 mph	1:33.19.13
3	(England) Roy Richardson	349 cc Aermacchi	94.982 mph	1:35.20.16
4	(England) Bill Swallow	348 cc AJS	94.604 mph	1:35.43.04
5	(Isle of Man) David Madsen-Mygdal	348 cc Honda	93.000 mph	1:37.22.05
6	(Scotland) Derek Glass	346 cc Honda	92.054 mph	1:38.22.08
7	(England) Doug Snow	340 cc Honda	91.934 mph	1:38.29.79
8	(Isle of Man) Dean Martin	350 cc Honda	88.816 mph	1:41.57.24
9	(Republic of Ireland) Sean Leonard	346 cc Honda	88.254 mph	1:42.36.23
10	(England) Ken Davis	349 cc Honda	87.682 mph	1:43.16.14

Fastest Lap; Ryan Farquhar 99.908 mph (22 minutes 99.908 secs)

=== Race 2b; Lightweight Classic Race ===
Monday 29 August 2011 – Mountain Course 4 laps – 150.92 miles (242.80 km)

- For motorcycles exceeding 175 cc and not exceeding 250 cc

Rank	Rider	Team	Speed	Time
1	(Northern Ireland) Barry Davidson	249 cc Suzuki	88.331 mph	1:42.30.89
2	(England) Peter Wakefield	247 cc Suzuki	87.794 mph	1:43.08.50
3	(England) Maria Costello	250 cc Suzuki	88.210 mph	1:47.31.88
4	(England) Dave Edwards	246 cc Yamaha	81.219 mph	1:51.29.45
5	(England) Geoff Bates	249 cc Honda	79.175 mph	1:54.22.20
6	(England) Neil Cudworth	247 cc Kawasaki	76.198 mph	1:58.50.26

Fastest Lap; Ewan Hamilton 91.204 mph (24 minutes 49.27 secs)

=== Race 3; Junior Manx Grand Prix ===
Monday 29 August 2011 Mountain Course 4 laps – 150.92 miles (242.80 km)

- 201 cc–250 cc Two-stroke Two-cylinder motorcycles.
- 550 cc–600 cc Four-stroke Four-cylinder motorcycles.
- 601 cc–675 cc Four-stroke Three-cylinder motorcycles.
- 651 cc–750 cc Four-stroke Two-cylinder motorcycles.

Rank	Rider	Team	Speed	Time
1	(Northern Ireland) Andrew Brady	599 cc Honda	107.513 mph	1:24.13.47
2	(Isle of Man) Paul Smyth	600 cc Yamaha	107.360 mph	1:24.20.64
3	(Northern Ireland) Stephen McKnight	599 cc Yamaha	106.698 mph	1:24.52.06
4	(England) Jamie Coward	600 cc Suzuki	105.669 mph	1:25.41.65
5	(Isle of Man) Jonny Heginbotham	599 cc Honda	105.295 mph	1:25.59.92
6	(England) Dave Moffitt	599 cc Honda	104.610 mph	1:26.33.69
7	(Northern Ireland) Dennis Booth	600 cc Yamaha	104.596 mph	1:26.34.40
8	(Republic of Ireland) Andrew Farrell	600 cc Yamaha	103.708 mph	1:27.18.85
9	(England) John Hildreth	600 cc Suzuki	102.037 mph	1:28.44.64
10	(England) Philip McGurk	600 cc Honda	101.784 mph	1:28.57.90

Fastest Lap; Dennis Booth 111.128 mph (20 minutes 22.27 secs)

=== Race 4; 500 cc Classic Race ===
Wednesday 31 August 2011 Mountain Course 4 laps – 150.92 miles (242.80 km)

- For classic motorcycles exceeding 351 cc and not exceeding 500 cc

Rank	Rider	Team	Speed	Time
1	(Northern Ireland) Ryan Farquhar	499 cc Paton	105.248 mph	1:26.02.22
2	(England) Chris Palmer	499 cc Matchless	102.998 mph	1:27.54.97
3	(England) Mark Herbertson	500 cc Matchless	102.196 mph	1:28.36.35
4	(England) Steve Linsdell	500 cc Royal Enfield	102.032 mph	1:28.44.89
5	(Wales) Meredydd Owen	498 cc Seeley	98.833 mph	1:31.37.30
6	(Wales) Bob Owen	500 cc Seeley	98.149 mph	1:32.15.60
7	(France) Bruno Leroy	499 cc Norton	96.878 mph	1:33.28.20
8	(England) Dave Matravers	500 cc Matchless	96.459 mph	1:33.52.57
9	(England) Henry Bell	498 cc Honda	96.180 mph	1:34.08.88
10	(Scotland) Wattie Brown	498 cc Petty	95.939 mph	1:34.23.10

Fastest Lap: Ryan Farquhar – 107.378 mph (21 minutes 04.95 secs)

=== Race 4b; Formula Classic Race ===
Wednesday 31 August 2011 Mountain Course 4 laps – 150.92 miles (242.80 km)

- For motorcycles exceeding 501 cc and not exceeding 750 cc

Rank	Rider	Team	Speed	Time
1	(England) Mark Parrett	850 cc BSA	96.848 mph	1:33.29.93

Fastest Lap; Chris McGahan 100.276 mph (22 minutes 34.55 secs)

=== Race 5; Supertwin Race ===
Wednesday 31 August 2011 Mountain Course 4 laps – 150.92 miles (242.80 km)

- For motorcycles exceeding 201 cc and not exceeding 650 cc Two-stroke Twin-cylinder motorcycles

Rank	Rider	Team	Speed	Time
1	(Isle of Man) Dave Moffitt	645 cc Suzuki	107.447 mph	1:24.16.55
2	(Northern Ireland) Joe Phillips	650 cc Yamasaki	106.954 mph	1:24.39.86
3	(England) Phil Harvey	250 cc Honda	106.912 mph	1:24.41.84
4	(Northern Ireland) Shaun Anderson	650 cc Kawasaki	106.739 mph	1:24.50.08
5	(Republic of Ireland) Michael Sweeney	650 cc Suzuki	105.935 mph	1:25.28.75
6	(Scotland) Rab Davie	650 cc Kawasaki	103.547 mph	1:27.26.99
7	(England) Tom Llewelyn	650 cc Kawasaki	101.889 mph	1:28.52.38
8	(England) Richard Gelder	650 cc Kawasaki	100.521 mph	1:30.04.95
9	(England) Adrian Cox	650 cc Kawasaki	100.364 mph	1:30.13.44
10	(Isle of Man) Brian Appleton	650 cc Suzuki	100.251 mph	1:30.19.51

Fastest Lap: Dave Moffitt – 109.547 mph (20 minutes 39.91 secs)

=== Race 5b; Lightweight Race ===
Wednesday 31 August 2011 Mountain Course 4 laps – 150.92 miles (242.80 km)

- Two-stroke motorcycles up to 125 cc, 6 gears maximum.
- Four-stroke motorcycles 251 cc–401 cc

Rank	Rider	Team	Speed	Time
1	(Isle of Man) Billy Smith	400 cc Yamaha	103.813 mph	1:27.13.58
2	(England) Alistair Haworth	400 cc Yamaha	103.259 mph	1:27.41.66
3	(England) Ross Johnson	400 cc Kawasaki	102.745 mph	1:28.07.94
4	(Republic of Ireland) David Yeomans	400 cc Kawasaki	102.244 mph	1:28.33.86
5	(England) Daniel Millard	400 cc Kawasaki	101.500 mph	1:29.12.85
6	(Isle of Man) Adam Jones	400 cc Kawasaki	101.311 mph	1:29.22.79
7	(Isle of Man) Peter Simpson	400 cc Kawasaki	101.255 mph	1:29.25.80
8	(England) Mike Carter	400 cc Honda	100.397 mph	1:30.11.62
9	(Isle of Man) Brian Gordon	400 cc Honda	99.508 mph	1:31.55.43
10	(England) Scott Smyth	399 cc Honda	97.112 mph	1:33.14.68

Fastest Lap: Alistair Haworth – 105.397 mph (21 minutes 28.73 secs)

=== Race 6; Senior Manx Grand Prix ===
Friday 2 September 2011 Mountain Course 4 laps – 150.92 miles (242.80 km)

- Four-stroke Four-cylinder motorcycles exceeding 550 cc and not exceeding 750 cc.
- Four-stroke Twin-cylinder motorcycles exceeding 651 cc and not exceeding 1000 cc.
- Four-stroke Three-cylinder motorcycles exceeding 601 cc and not exceeding 675 cc.

Rank	Rider	Team	Speed	Time
1	(Northern Ireland) Andrew Brady	750 cc Suzuki	113.788 mph	1:19.34.75
2	(England) Grant Wagstaff	599 cc Yamaha	113.701 mph	1:19.38.42
3	(Isle of Man) Dan Sayle	600 cc Yamaha	111.195 mph	1:21.26.13
4	(Republic of Ireland) Michael Sweeney	600 cc Yamaha	110.371 mph	1:22.02.61
5	(Republic of Ireland) Andrew Farrell	750 cc Suzuki	109.740 mph	1:22.30.89
6	(Northern Ireland) Stephen McKnight	599 cc Yamaha	109.143 mph	1:22.57.97
7	(England) David Milling	998 cc Aprilia	108.606 mph	1:23.22.59
8	(Isle of Man) Glyn Jones	600 cc Suzuki	107.914 mph	1:23.54.67
9	(Republic of Ireland) David Lumsden	600 cc Honda	107.863 mph	1:23.57.04
10	(Northern Ireland) Trevor Ferguson	750 cc Suzuki	107.728 mph	1:24.03.37

Fastest Lap; Grant Wagstaff 117.429 mph (19 minutes 16.68 secs).

=== Race 7a; Classic Superbike Race ===
Friday 2 August 2011 Mountain Course 4 laps – 150.92 miles (242.80 km)

- Class A
- Classic Machines 601 cc-1050 cc Four-stroke motorcycles.
- 351 cc-750 cc Two-stroke motorcycles.

Rank	Rider	Team	Speed	Time
1	(Northern Ireland) Ryan Farquhar	1016 cc Suzuki	113.437 mph	1:19.49.56
2	(Isle of Man) John Barton	750 cc Suzuki	107.131 mph	1:24.31.47
3	(England) Mick Godfrey	1000 cc Kawasaki	107.022 mph	1:24.36.65
4	(England) Andy Lovett	750 cc Suzuki	104.620 mph	1:26.33.19
5	(England) Ken Davis	749 cc Yamaha	103.225 mph	1:27.43.36
6	(Isle of Man) David Madsen-Mygdal	1045 cc Kawasaki	102.591 mph	1:28.15.90
7	(England) Alec Whitewell	750 cc Suzuki	100.849 mph	1:29.47.37
8	(England) Neil Vicars	750 cc Suzuki	100.489 mph	1:30.06.70
9	(England) David Taylor	750 cc Yamaha	100.208 mph	1:30.21.83
10	(England) Nigel Rea	750 cc Suzuki	98.893 mph	1:31.33.92

Fastest Lap; Ryan Farquhar 116.574 mph (19 minutes 25.17 secs)

=== Race 7b; Junior Post Classic Race ===
Friday 2 August 2011 Mountain Course 4 laps – 150.92 miles (242.80 km)

- Class B
- 126 cc-250 cc Two-stroke Cylinder Grand Prix/Standard motorcycles.
- 251 cc-350 cc Two-stroke Cylinder standard motorcycles.
- Up to 600cccc Four-stroke Cylinder motorcycles.
- For motorcycles exceeding 175 cc and not exceeding 250 cc

Rank	Rider	Team	Speed	Time
1	(England) Roy Richardson	249 cc Yamaha	108.823 mph	1:23.12.61
2	(England) Chris Palmer	250 cc Yamaha	107.902 mph	1:23.55.26
3	(England) Stuart Garton	250 cc Yamaha	106.427 mph	1:25.05.03
4	(Northern Ireland) Barry Davidson	249 cc Yamaha	103.976 mph	1:27.05.34
5	(England) Philip McGurk	250 cc Yamaha	101.467 mph	1:29.14.55
6	(England) Peter Symes	250 cc Yamaha	98.755 mph	1:31.41.62
7	(England) Bob Price	600 cc Kawasaki	97.407 mph	1:32.57.76
8	(Scotland) Derek Glass	249 cc Yamaha	96.309 mph	1:34.01.32
9	(Northern Ireland) Shaun Anderson	500 cc Honda	93.751 mph	1:36.35.28
10	(England) Tony Russell	250 cc Yamaha	93.501 mph	1:36.50.77

Fastest Lap; Roy Richardson 111.161 mph (20 minutes 21.91 secs)

== Gallery ==
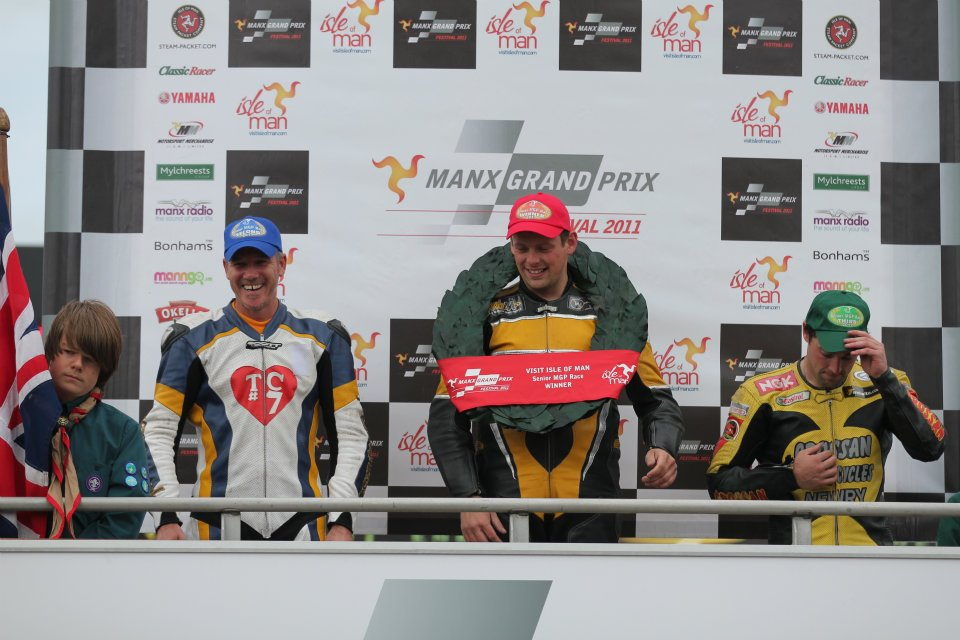
2011 Senior MGP podium - (From left to right) Grant Wagstaff, Andrew Brady, Dan Sayle.

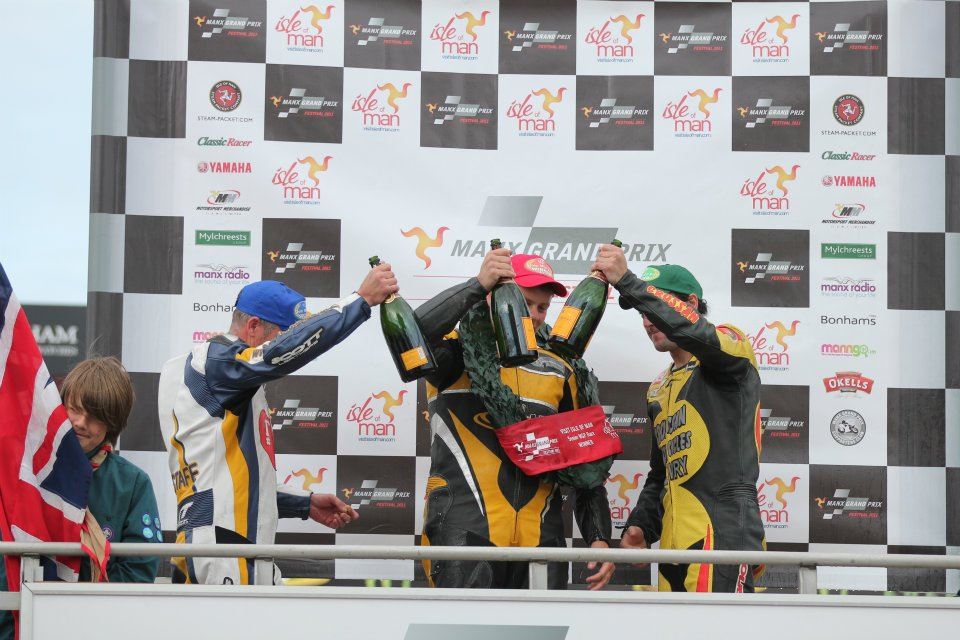
2011 Senior MGP podium - (From left to right) Grant Wagstaff, Andrew Brady, Dan Sayle.

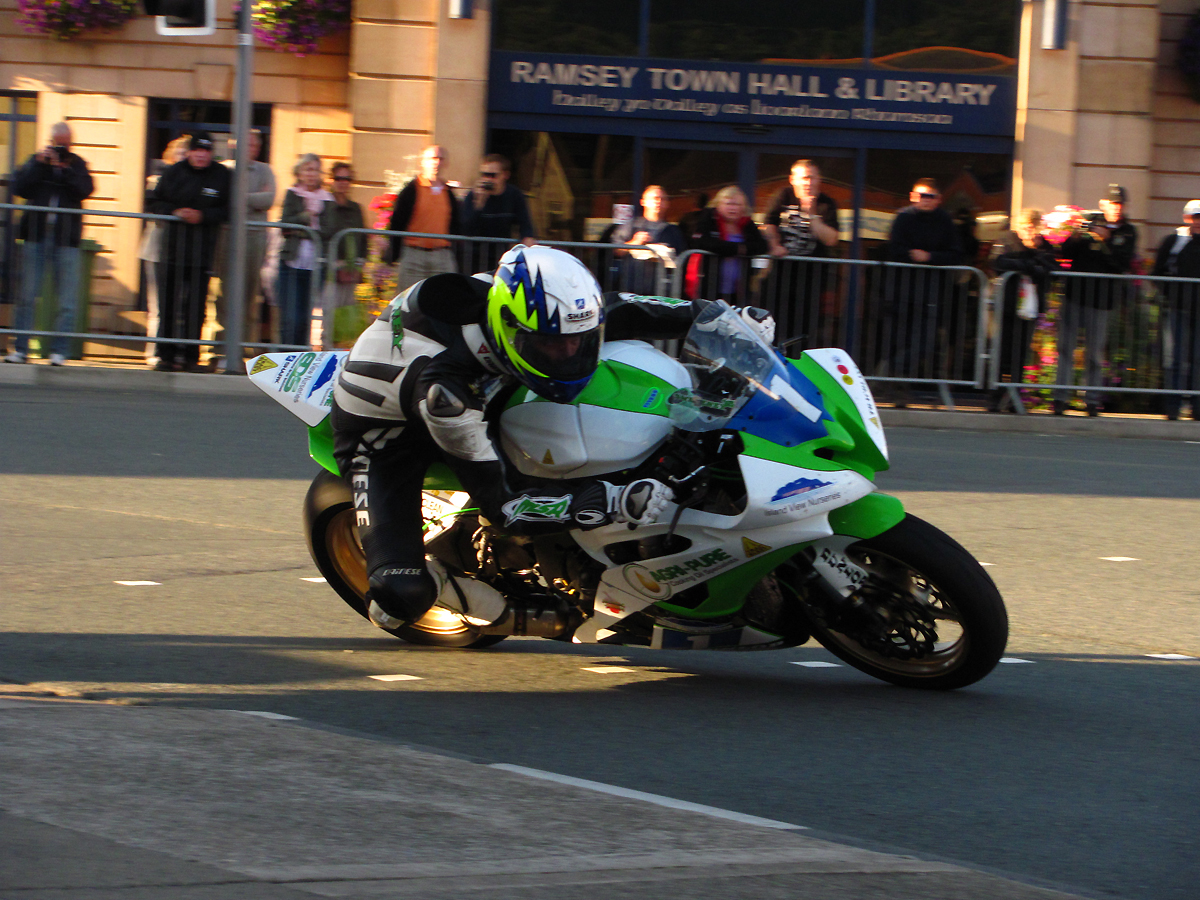
Michael Sweeney 600 cc Yamaha R6 – Wednesday Evening Practice 24 August 2011, Parliament Square Ramsey.

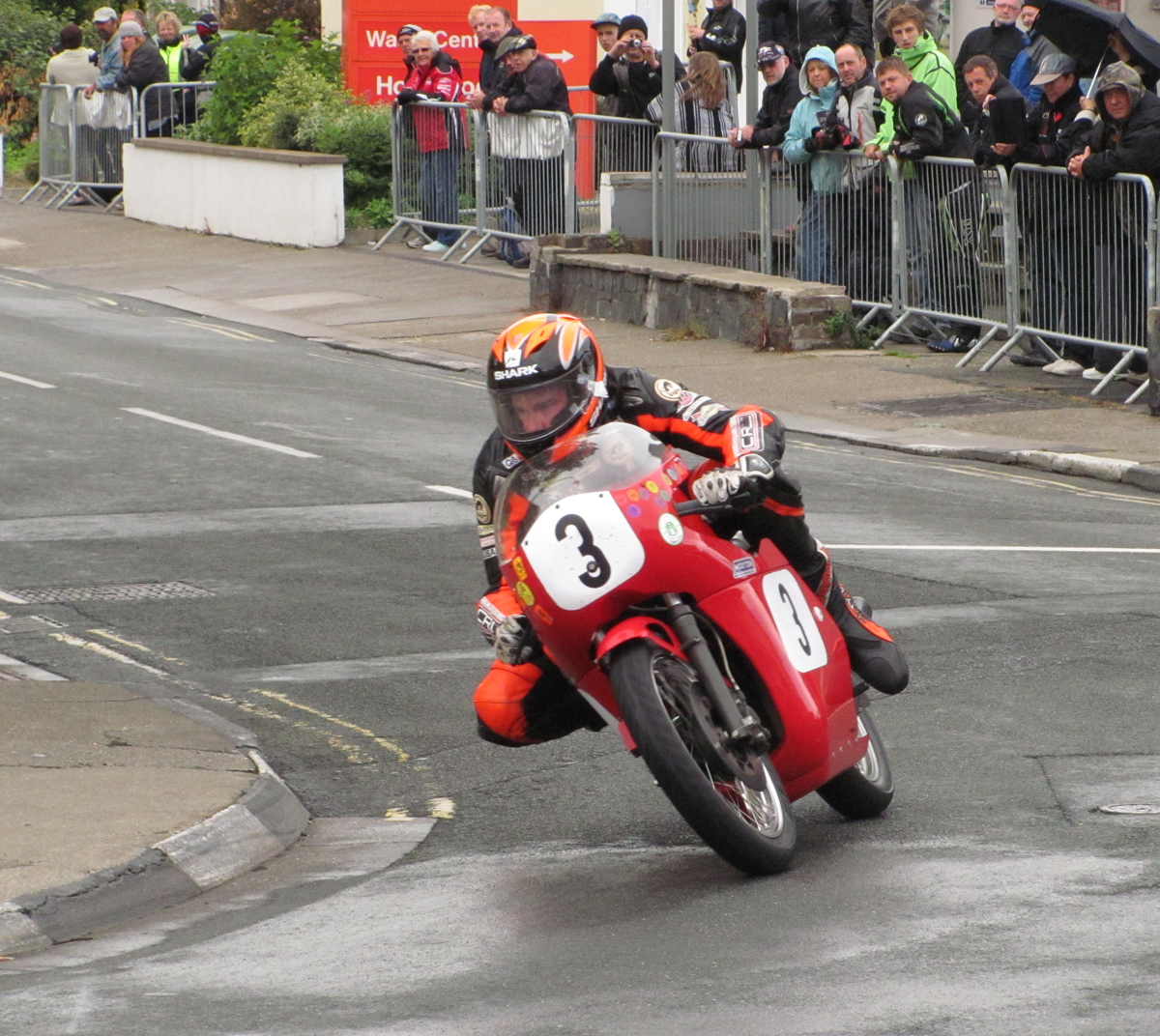
Ryan Farquhar – 350 cc Honda Junior Classic Manx Grand Prix 2011, Parliament Square, Ramsey

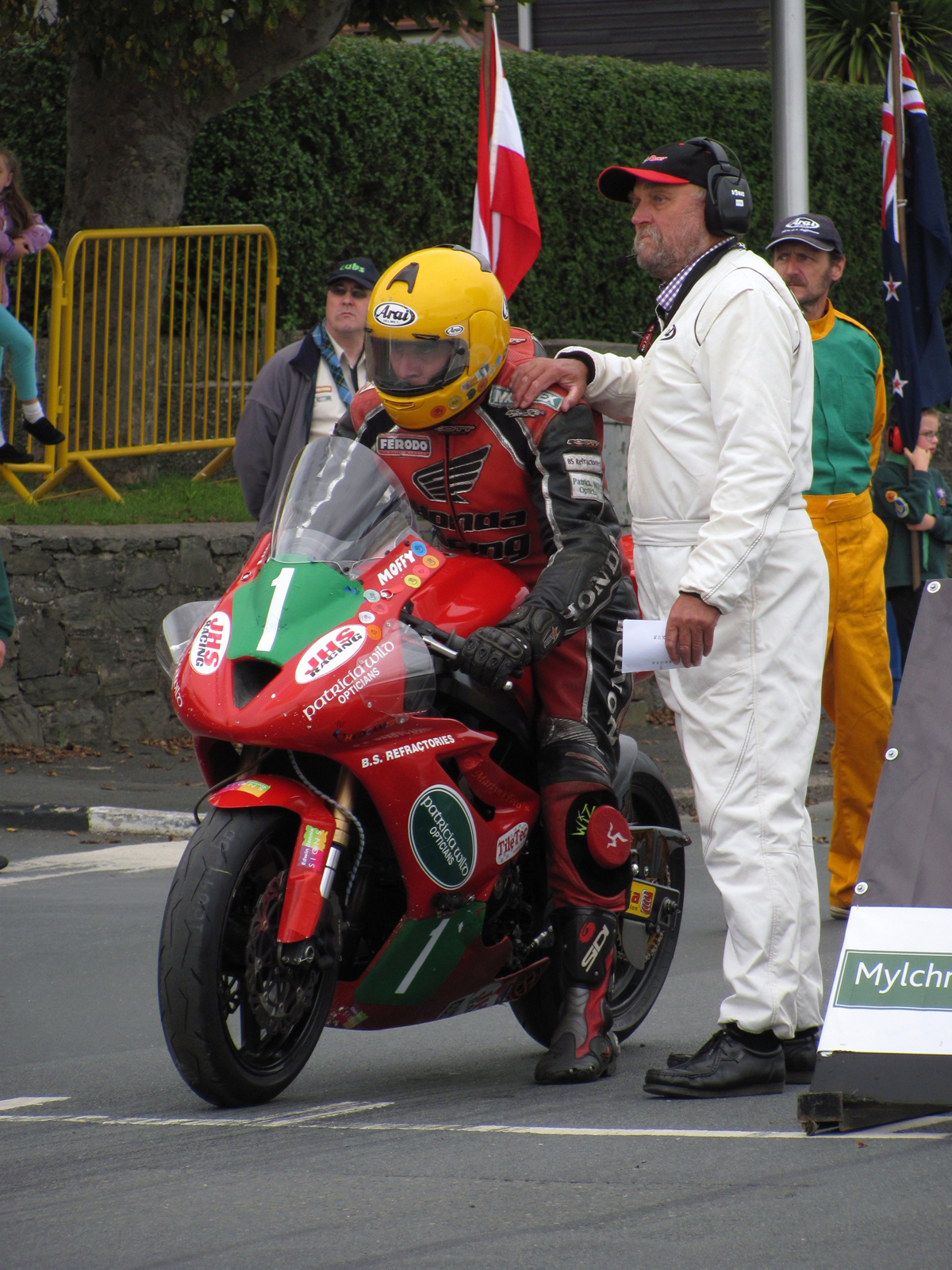
Dave Moffitt – 650 cc Supertwin Race – Manx Grand Prix 2011, Start-Line TT Grandstand
