= Ballacrye Corner =

Road in the Isle of Man

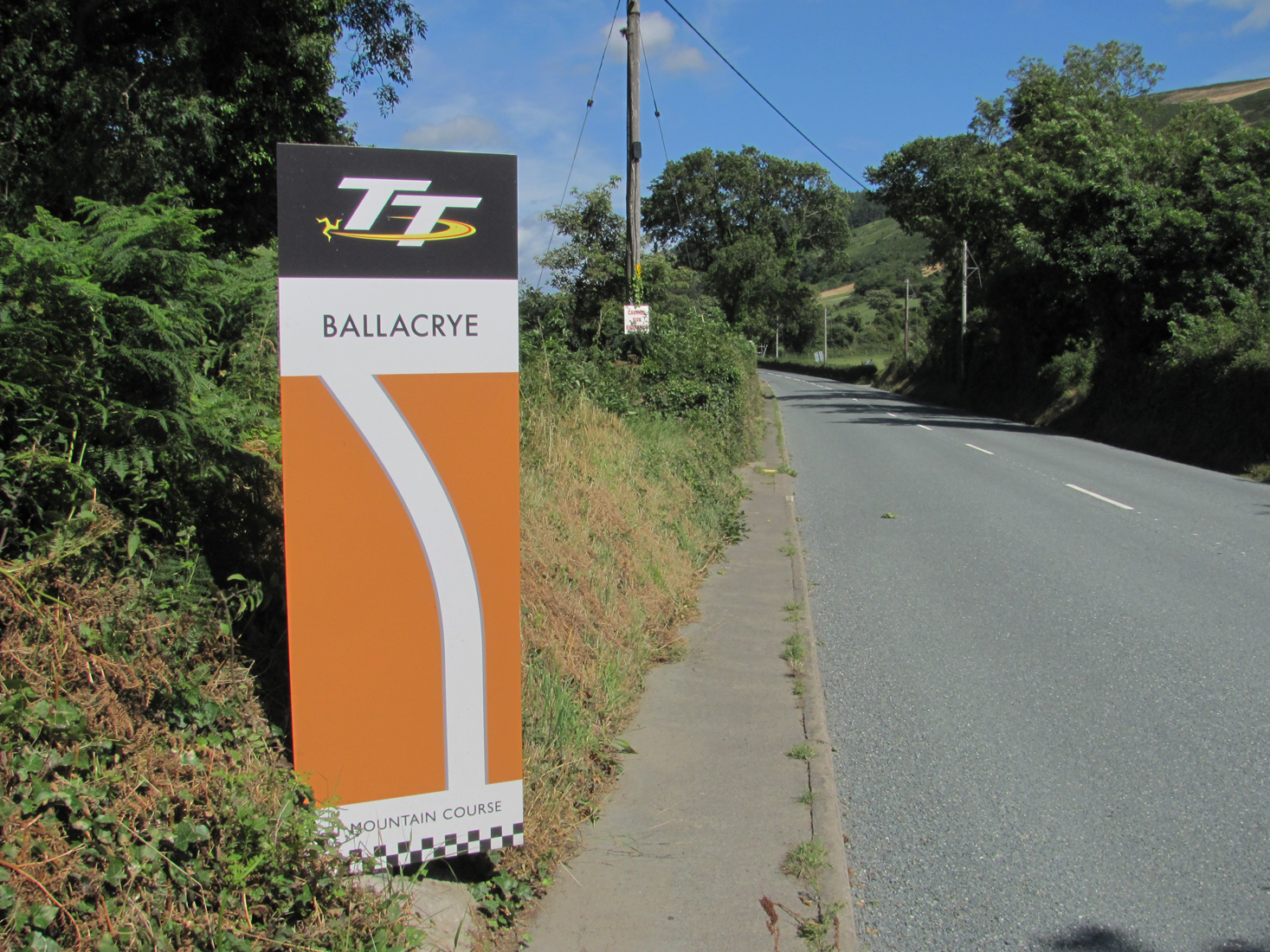
- A3 Castletown to Ramsey road at Ballacrye Corner.

- Location within Isle of Man
- 54°18′4.8″N 4°31′34.9″W

Ballacrye (Manx: [baləˈkʰɾaːi], "Crye's farm") is situated adjacent to the 19th Milestone of the TT Course, on the primary A3 Castletown to Ramsey road at the junction with the B9 Ballacrye Road, in the parish of Ballaugh in the Isle of Man.

== Description ==
The area of Ballacrye is a former Quarterland including Ballacrye farm which are part of the former Treen of Ballyvall.

== Motor-sport heritage ==
The Ballacrye corner was part of the 37.50 Mile Four Inch Course used for automobile racing for the RAC Tourist Trophy car races held between 1906 and 1922.

In 1911, the Four Inch Course for automobiles was first used by the Auto-Cycling Union for the Isle of Man TT motorcycle races. This included Ballacrye Corner and the nearby Ballacrye jump and the course later became known as the 37.73 mile Isle of Man TT Mountain Course which has been used since 1911 for the Isle of Man TT Races and from 1923 for the Manx Grand Prix races.

During practice for the 1953 Isle of Man TT races, John Surtees crashed near to Ballacrye, suffering an injury which forced him to withdraw from his first Isle of Man TT races.
