= Gob-ny-Geay =

Coordinates: 54°11′57″N 4°28′29″W

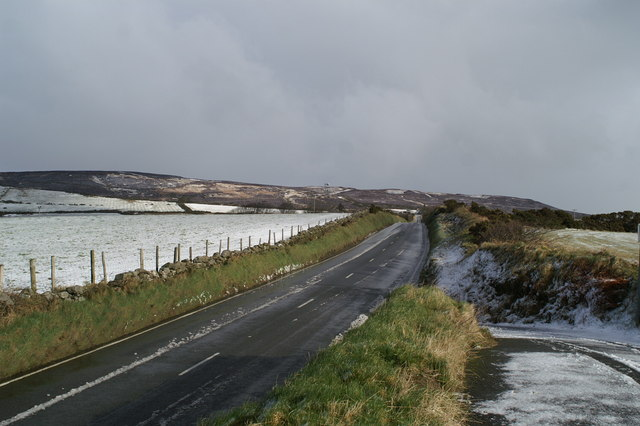
A18 road along Gobnageay Farm

Gob-ny-Geay (or Gob ny geayee, in Manx Gaelic the mouth of the wind) is situated at the 35th Milestone on the Snaefell Mountain Course on the primary A18 Mountain Road in the parish of Onchan in the Isle of Man.

Gob-ny-Geay was part of the Highland Course and Four Inch Course used for the Gordon Bennett Trial and Tourist Trophy car races between 1904 and 1922. The Gob-ny-Geay straight is part of the Mountain Course used since 1911 for the Isle of Man TT and Manx Grand Prix races.
