= Quarry Bends =

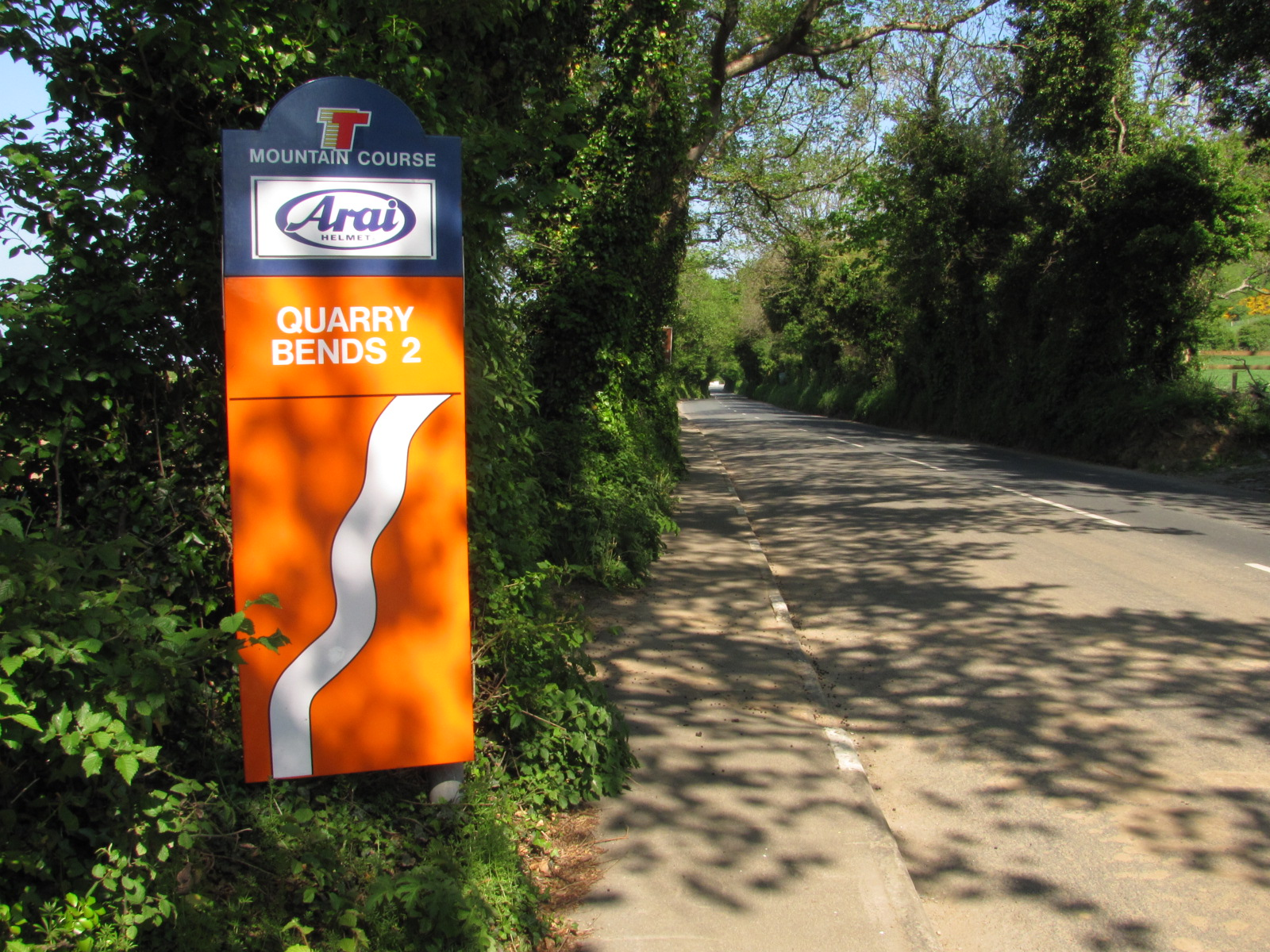
- The A3 Castletown to Ramsey Road approaching Quarry Bends, between Ballaugh and Sulby, Isle of Man.

- Location within Isle of Man
- 54°18′57.9″N 4°30′39.7″W

History
- Built: c.1600, c.1815, 1985

Quarry Bends (Clarks Quarry; Manx: Close e Volley – "Enclosure of the Old Curragh Road") is situated adjacent to the 20th Milestone road-side marker on the primary A3 Castletown to Ramsey, in the parishes of Ballaugh and Kirk Christ Lezayre in the Isle of Man.

== Location ==
Quarry Bends is the site of the Curraghs Wildlife Park and also the nearby Gob-y-Volley Forestry Plantation and the former Isle of Man Forestry Board, Close-e-Volley Depot and the nearby Ballavolley Quarry.

The wetland enclosures at Close-e-Volley and Ballavolley are part of the Ballaugh Curragh (Norse: Mirescog – Mire of the Turbary) of 1,000 acres (405 ha) in area.

== A3 Castletown to Ramsey Road ==
The primary A3 road was part of "the long round," the former journey made by horse-drawn carriers from Castletown to Ramsey. The Ballaugh and Lezayre parish sections of the Ramsey old road before the draining of the remains of the post-glacial Lake Andreas (c.1500–1600) and the building of the Sulby Straight (c.1815), was the A13 Sandygate Road adjacent to the boundary of the Curragh's wetland along with the tertiary U7 Old Sulby Road, C29 Old Windmill Road and the B9 Ballacrye Road.

== Curragh wildlife park ==
The Curragh's (Manx pronunciation: [ˈkʰoɾəɡ]) were traditionally a wetlands area for growing hay for grazing including attempts in the 1930s to grow New Zealand flax (Phormium tenax and Phormium colensoi). The wetlands area was purchased in 1963 by the Isle of Man Forestry, Lands and Mines Board and the Curraghs Wildlife Park of 211 Acres (85 ha) at Quarry Bends and was opened by the Lieutenant Governor of the Isle of Man, Sir Ronald Garvey on 23 July 1965. The Curragh's Wildlife Park is now part of the Isle of Man Department of Enterprise and the Wildlife Park includes from 1992 The Orchid Line, a multi-gauge miniature railway of 1,750 feet in length operated by the Manx Model Engineering Society.

== Former railway-line ==
In 1879, the Manx Northern Railway built a narrow gauge railway from St.John's to Ramsey which ran parallel to the A3 road from Kirk Michael to Sulby Bridge. The railway line crossed a number of minor roads as it passed through the Curraghs wetlands at Ballacrye, Ballavolley and Cooilbane. A small railway siding was built in 1882 to serve the Clarks stone quarry at Ballavolley, crossing the primary A3 road at Close-e-Volley. Later renamed Quarry Bends, the line running to a small loading wharf and railway siding to the main Ramsey to St. John's railway line.

== Motor-sport heritage ==
The Quarry Bends complex of bends was part of the 37.50 Mile Four Inch Course for the RAC Tourist Trophy automobile races held in the Isle of Man between 1906 and 1922.

In 1911, the Four Inch Course for automobiles was first used by the Auto-Cycling Union for the Isle of Man TT motorcycle races. This included Quarry Bends and the course later became known as the 37.73 mile Isle of Man TT Mountain Course which has been used since 1911 for the Isle of Man TT Races and from 1923 for the Manx Grand Prix races.

== Road improvements ==
Extensive road widening and road profiling occurred during 1984/1985 at Quarry Bends by the Isle of Man Highway and Transport Board with the removal of trees and the creation of a road-side picnic-area.

== Gallery ==
Two TT motorcyclists approaching Quarry Bends in 2003.
