= Greeba Bridge =

- Location within Isle of Man
- 54°11′48.5″N 4°36′20.9″W

Greeba Bridge is situated between the 6th milestone and 7th road milestones on the primary A1 Douglas to Peel road and the junction with the Greeba Mill Road in the parish of Kirk German in the Isle of Man.

The A1 Greeba road bridge passes over the Greeba river, a tributary of the River Dhoo which flows eastward to the town of Douglas. The Greeba river flows into the nearby Greeba Curragh or ‘Greeba Gap,’ a former pre-Ice Age river valley, a low-lying watershed of the Douglas to Peel central valley.

== Description ==
The area of Greeba /griːɓə/ (Old Norse: gnípa ‘summit, top’ or kúpa ‘bowl, bowl formed valley’) is located in the Central Valley of the Isle of Man.

The nearby area to Greeba Bridge is mainly farmland, located in the former Cronkdhoo Quarterland. The vicinity is dominated by the nearby mountain land of Greeba Mountain (422m) and the Greeba or Kings forestry plantation, along with the nearby summits of Beary Mountain (311m) and Slieau Ruy (479m).

== Motor-sport heritage ==
The Greeba Bridge section of the A1 Douglas to Peel road was part of the short Highland Course (40.38 miles) from 1906 and the also the 37.50 Mile Four Inch Course used for car racing including the RAC Tourist Trophy car races held between 1905 and 1922.

In 1911, the Four Inch Course was first used by the Auto-Cycling Union for the Isle of Man TT motorcycle races. This included the Greeba Bridge section and the course later became known as the 37.73 mile Isle of Man TT Mountain Course which has been used since 1911 for the Isle of Man TT Races and from 1923 for the Manx Grand Prix races.

During the 1929 Senior TT race, held in poor weather conditions and heavy rain, a number of competitors crashed on the narrow approach to Greeba Bridge. This include the experienced motor-cycle racing competitor Doug Lamb, later dying from injuries suffered in the accident.
