= History of the Isle of Man TT Races 1920–1929 =

Coordinates: 54°10′02″N 4°28′44″W

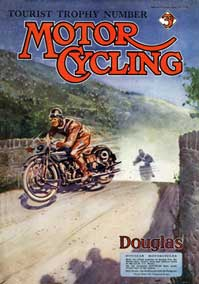
1926 magazine cover featuring a Douglas motorcycle in the Isle of Man TT

The Isle of Man TT and other motorcycle racing in the island did not restart after the end of the First World War until 1920. Changes were made to the Snaefell Mountain Course causing competitors to turn left and proceed up the hill at Cronk-ny-Mona to follow the primary A18 Snaefell Mountain Road through to Governor's Bridge with a new start/finish line at Glencrutchery Road lengthening the course to 37¾ miles.

== 1920–1922 ==
The 1920 Junior TT race included for the first time a new Lightweight class for motorcycles of 250 cc engine capacity. The Lightweight class of the 1920 Junior TT was won by Ronald Clarke, riding a Levis. He might have won the event overall, but crashed at the 33rd Milestone on the last lap, finishing fourth overall. The 1921 Senior TT race was won by Howard Davies on a 350 cc Junior TT AJS by a margin of 2 minutes and 3 seconds from Freddie Dixon and Hubert Le Vack. For 1922 the ACU introduced a Lightweight TT race for 250 cc motorcycles, and the first winner was Geoff S Davison riding a Levis at an average race speed of 49.89. The 1922 Junior TT Race was won by local Isle of Man competitor Tom Sheard riding an AJS at an average race speed of 54.75 mph. Despite crashing twice, a broken exhaust and a fire in the pits, Stanley Woods, riding a Cotton, finished 5th in the 1922 Junior TT race. In the 1922 Senior TT race, Alex Bennett riding a Sunbeam led all 6 laps from start to finish to win from Walter Brandish riding a Triumph.

== 1923 ==
More changes to the course followed in 1923 with the adoption of a private road between Parliament Square and May Hill in Ramsey. The course had previously negotiated Albert Road and Tower Road. The course length was then 37.739 miles (60.735 km) (revised to 37.733 miles in 1938). Brandish Corner, between Creg-ny-Baa and Hillberry, was named after Walter Brandish who crashed there and broke a leg. The first Sidecar TT race, held in 1923 over 3 laps (113 miles), was won by Freddie Dixon and passenger Walter Denny with a Douglas and special banking-sidecar at an average race speed of 53.15 miles per hour (85.54 km/h). The Senior TT race of 1923 was held in poor weather, and local course knowledge allowed local Manx competitor Tom Sheard, on a Douglas, to win his second TT race, in addition to his first win in the 1922 Junior TT on an AJS. Another first-time winner of a TT race in 1923 was Stanley Woods in the Junior race on a Cotton.

== 1924 ==
In 1924, an Ultra-Lightweight TT race was introduced for 175 cc motorcycles, following the introduction of a Lightweight TT race in 1922. The 1924 Ultra-Lightweight TT began with a massed start for competitors rather than pairs for the normal time-trial format of the TT races. The first winner of the Ultra-Lightweight TT in 1924 was Jock Porter on a New Gerrard at average speed of 51.20 mph. The Lightweight TT and the Senior TT of 1924 were run in conjunction and Eddie Twemlow (Ken Twemlow's brother) won at an average speed of 55.44 mph on a New Imperial. The Senior TT race of 1924, like the 1924 Junior TT, was run at record breaking pace achieving a race average speed over 60 mph for the first time, by Alec Bennett riding a Norton.

== 1925–26 ==
After numerous retirements in 1924, Wal Handley won the 1925 Junior TT race over 6 laps of the Mountain Course on a Rex-Acme at an average speed of 65.02 mph. Later in the week Handley became the first TT rider to win two races in a week when he won the Ultra-Lightweight TT, again on a Rex-Acme. The 1925 Senior TT race was sensationally won by Howard Davis while competing against the works teams with a motorcycle of his own manufacture, the HRD at an average speed of 66.13 mph.

In 1926 the Sidecar and Ultra-Lightweight TT races were scrapped due to lack of entries. Most of the Snaefell Mountain Course had now been completely tarmacced, including the narrow sections on the A18 Mountain Road. Another change in 1926 was the ban on alcohol-based fuels, forcing competitors to use road petrol. The prestige of the Isle of Man TT races had encouraged the Italian motorcycle manufacturers Bianchi, Garelli and Moto Guzzi to enter. The 1926 Lightweight TT produced one of the most notorious events in the history of the TT races, described by The Motor Cycle magazine as the "Guzzi Incident". Italian rider Pietro Ghersi was disqualified from second place for using a different spark-plug in the engine of his Moto Guzzi. The 1926 Senior TT race produced the first 70 mph lap set by Jimmy Simpson on an AJS in 32 minutes and 9 seconds, at an average speed of 70.43 mph.

== 1927–1929 ==
In 1927 Archie Birkin, brother of Tim Birkin of the Bentley Boys fame, was killed during practice. The corner in Kirk Michael where the accident occurred was renamed Birkin's Bend, and from 1928-onwards practice sessions were held on closed roads. The newly developed 'positive-stop' foot gear-change developed by Velocette gave Alec Bennett his fifth TT win in the 1928 Junior race at an average race speed of 68.65 mph from his team-mate Harold Willis.

The 1929 Lightweight race was led for 5 laps by Pietro Ghersi on a Moto Guzzi, competing in his first TT race since the disqualification in the 'Guzzi Incident' of 1926. Despite Pietro Ghersi setting the fastest lap at an average speed of 66.63 mph, engine failure gave the win to Syd Crabtree. During the 1929 Senior TT a number of riders crashed at Greeba Castle after Wal Handley clipped the hedge and crashed. This included Jimmy Simpson, Jack Amott riding a Rudge and Doug Lamb who later died of his injuries on the way to Nobles Hospital. Charlie Dodson completed a Senior TT double by winning the 1929 race at an average speed of 72.05 mph.

== See also ==
- Snaefell Mountain Course
- Manx Grand Prix
- North West 200
- Outline of motorcycles and motorcycling

== Notes ==
=== References ===
- Barker, Stuart (2007). 100 One Hundred Years of the TT. EMAP ISBN 1-84605-235-1
- Duckworth, Mick (2007). TT 100 – The Authorised History of the Isle of Man Tourist Trophy Racing. Lily Publications ISBN 9781899602674
- Harris, Nick (1991). Motocourse History of the Isle of Man Tourist Trophy Races 1907–1989 Hazelton Publishing ISBN 0-905138-71-6
- Mac McDiarmid (2004). The Magic of The TT. A Century of Racing over The Mountain Haynes Publishing. ISBN 1-84425-002-4
- Noyes, Denis (1999) 50 Years Of Moto Grand Prix. Hazelton Publishing Ltd ISBN 1-874557-83-7
- Pidcock, Fred & Snelling, Bill (2007) History of the Isle of Man Clubman's TT Races 1947–1956. Amulree Publications ISBN 1-901508-10-2
- Savage, Mike (1997) TT Heroes. Amulree Publications ISBN 0-9521126-9-8
- Snelling, Bill (1996). The Tourist Trophy in Old Photographs Collected by Bill Snelling. Sutton Publishing ISBN 1-84015-059-9
- Stroud, Jon (2007). The Little Book of the TT. Green Umbrella Publishing ISBN 1-905828-24-1
- Wright, David (2007). 100 Years of the Isle of Man TT Races. A Century of Motorcycle Racing. Crowood Press ISBN 1-86126-906-4
- Wright, David (2006). TT Topics and Tales. Amulree Publications ISBN 1-901508-09-9
