= Ballig =

Coordinates: 54°12′33″N 4°37′52″W

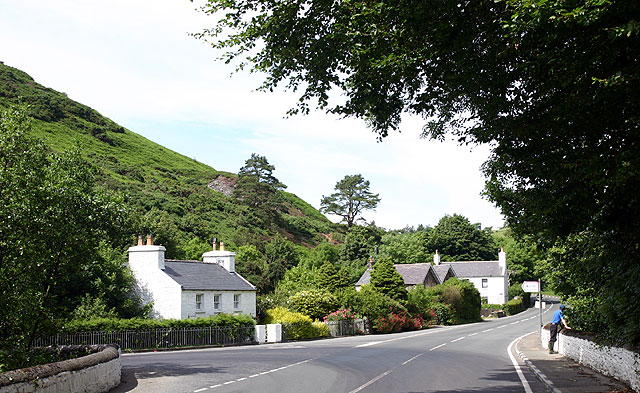
A3 Castletown to Ramsey Road at Ballig Bridge looking North along the TT course

Ballig (Manx: farm of the hollow, also known as Ballig Bridge) is a small hamlet of a few houses situated between the 8th and 9th Milestone road-side markers on the Snaefell Mountain Course between Ballacraine and Glen Helen. It is the site of a former notorious hump-back bridge used for the Isle of Man TT Races on the primary A3 Castletown to Ramsey and the road junction with the A20 Poortown Road in the parish of German in the Isle of Man.

The former Ballig Bridge was part of the Highland Course and Four Inch Course used for the Gordon Bennett Trial and Tourist Trophy automobile car races held in the Isle of Man between 1904 and 1922. Also, Ballig Bridge was part of the St John's Short Course used between 1907 and 1910 and part of the Snaefell Mountain Course used since 1911 for the Isle of Man TT Races and 1923 for the Manx Grand Prix.

The area is dominated by the farmland, including the Beary Mountain, St John's village, and Tynwald Mills. A number of changes occurred to the Mountain Course during the 1930s with extensive road widening on the A18 Mountain Road and the removal of the hump-back bridge and road straightening at Ballig for the 1935 racing season and the road work is completed for the Manx Grand Prix in September 1935. The George Formby film No Limit (1936 film) used the 1935 Isle of Man TT races as a backdrop for filming including Ballig Bridge.
