= 11th Milestone, Isle of Man =

11th Milestone
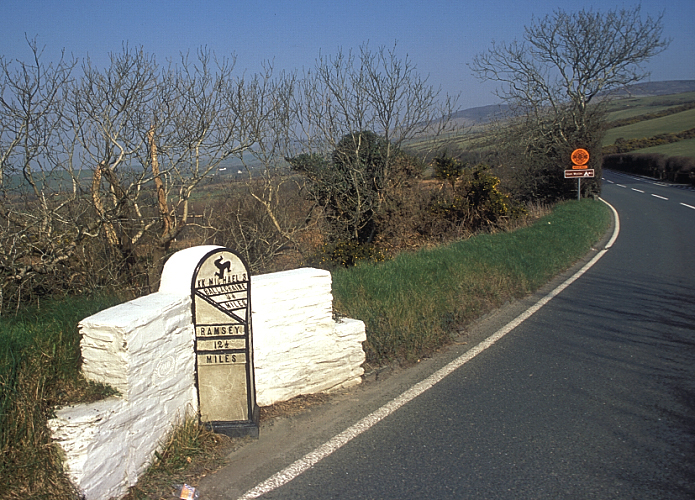
- The tall 'James Garrow' style metal milestone on the A3 Castletown to Ramsey Road at 'Drinkwater's Bend.'

- Location within Isle of Man
- 54°14′43″N 4°35′48″W

History
- Built: 1835–1850

The 11th Milestone, Isle of Man (Drinkwater's Bend) is situated adjacent to the 13th Milestone on the primary A3 Castletown to Ramsey Road which forms the boundary between the parishes of Kirk German and Kirk Michael in the Isle of Man.

== History ==
The area is dominated by the Ballamenagh and Shoughlaige-e-Caine farmland. During the 1830s, the primary A3 Road Castletown to Ramsey was re-profiled between Cronk-y-Voddy and Handley's Corner by the local parochial highway surveyor under the former Isle of Man parish board system. This was to avoid marshland and steep inclines creating the distinctive elongated S-bend.

The original stone 11th milestone on the A3 road was sited at the corner café at Glen Helen. An iron milestone from the 1860s during the period of James Garrow as Isle of Man Surveyor-General is now situated at the northerly end of the former 'Drinkwater's Bend' as the 13th Milestone on the primary A3 Castletown to Ramsey Road.

The current site of the 11th marker post or 11th Milestone road marker for the Isle of Man TT Mountain Course has been placed at Cronk Bane Farmhouse on the Cronk-y-Voddy straight.

== Motor-sport heritage ==
The distinctive elongated S-bend corner of the 11th Milestone section of the A3 Castletown to Ramsey road became part of the 37.50 Mile Four Inch Course for the RAC Tourist Trophy automobile races held in the Isle of Man between 1908 and 1922.

In 1911, the Four Inch Course for automobiles was first used by the Auto-Cycling Union for the Isle of Man TT motor-cycle races. This included the 11th Milestone and the course later became known as the 37.73 mile (60.70 km) Isle of Man TT Mountain Course which has been used since 1911 for the Isle of Man TT Races and from 1923 for the Manx Grand Prix races.

== Drinkwater's Bend ==
During the 1949 350 cc Junior TT race the popular amateur racer Ben Drinkwater crashed fatally at this point and the corner became known as Drinkwater's Bend, although subsequently the name became partly disused.

On the 5th lap of the 1961 Senior TT Races, Ralph Rensen crashed at the 11th Milestone and later died from his injuries.

== Road improvements ==
The corner was subjected to road surface repair work and re-profiling during the winter of 2005/2006 by the Department of Transport.
