= Cronk Urleigh =

- Location within Isle of Man
- 54°16′16″N 4°34′45″W

Cronk Urleigh (Manx pronunciation: [kʰɾoŋkʰ ˈuːlə]; "hill of the forecourt"; archaic Reneurling) is a stretch of road situated at the 15th Milestone on the primary A3 Castletown to Ramsey in the parish of Kirk Michael in the Isle of Man.

== Description ==
The nearby small hillock of Cronk Urleigh (Reneurling) adjacent to the main A3 Road is traditionally thought to be the site of the original Tynwald courts until 1422, although the site may have been situated at nearby Rhencullen in Kirk Michael.

== Origin of name ==
The name Reneurling (Manx: ’division, point of the forecourt’) is linked with the Tynwald court of 1422. The modern name of Cronk Urleigh may be incorrectly associated with the incorrect translation of ‘eagle hill.’

The Rev John Crellin of Kirk Michael writing in 1774 speculated that the name Cronk Urleigh / Reneurling may have been connected with the name for a Roman Standard used by ancient Roman Armies.

== Motor-sport heritage ==
The Cronk Urleigh section of the A3 Castletown to Ramsey road was part of the 37.50 Mile Four Inch Course used for the RAC Tourist Trophy automobile races held in the Isle of Man between 1908 and 1922.

In 1911, the Four Inch Course for automobiles was first used by the Auto-Cycling Union for the Isle of Man TT motor-cycle races. This included Cronk Urleigh, the 13th Milestone and the Westwood Corner ( Ballalona Bridge) section and the course later became known as the 37.73 mile (60.70 km) Isle of Man TT Mountain Course which has been used since 1911 for the Isle of Man TT Races and from 1923 for the Manx Grand Prix races.

During the 1970 Lightweight TT Race, the Spanish professional motor-cycle racer Santiago Herrero crashed at Westwood corner section of the TT Course and later dying from his injuries.
