= Handley's Corner, Isle of Man =

Road in Isle of Man

Coordinates: 54°14′59″N 4°35′26″W

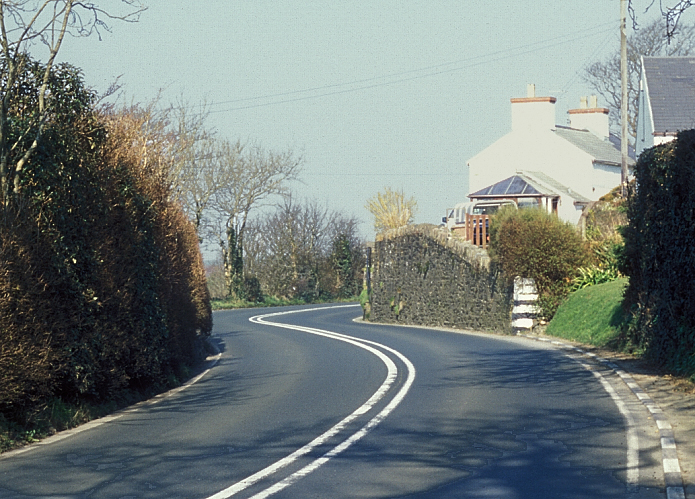
Handley's Corner, on A3 Castletown to Ramsey road

Handley's Corner (formerly Ballamenagh Corner) is situated just before the 12th Milestone road-side marker, measured from the startline at the TT Grandstand, on the Snaefell Mountain Course used for the Isle of Man TT races on the primary A3 road, in the parish of Michael, in the Isle of Man.

The previous course landmark is the 11th Milestone and the next is McGuinness's, named in 2013 after TT rider John McGuinness, just preceding the next point at Barregarrow.

The S-bend at Ballamenagh Corner, dominated by a high stone wall on the eastern side, was part of the Highland Course and the Four Inch Course used for the Gordon Bennett Trial and Tourist Trophy car races held between 1904 and 1922. The Ballamenagh Corner was part of the St John's Short Course used between 1907 and 1910 for the TT races. Later named Handley's Corner, it became part of the Snaefell Mountain Course used since 1911 for the TT and from 1923 for the Manx Grand Prix races.

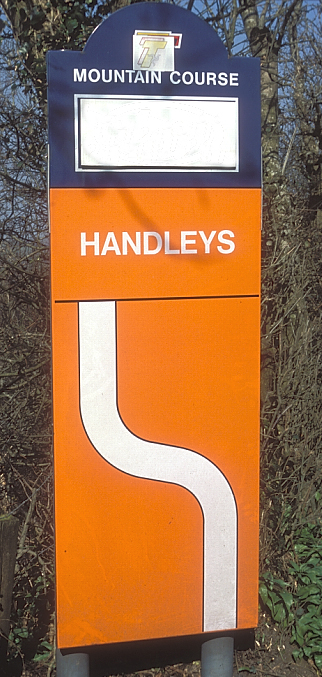

The area is dominated by the Ballamenagh and Shoughlaige-e-Caine farmland. The name derives from the TT race winner Wal Handley who, while riding a Rudge motorcycle, crashed heavily during lap 4 of the 1932 Senior TT race, sustained a back injury and subsequently retired from the race.

The corner underwent road widening and reprofiling during the winter of 1953/1954 for the 1954 TT races. From the winter of 2003 to 2006, road repair work was carried-out on the primary A3 road from Barregarrow to Cronk-y-Voddy, including Handley's Corner and the 11th Milestone, by the Department of Transport.
