= Highlander, Isle of Man =

Coordinates: 54°11′25″N 4°34′52″W

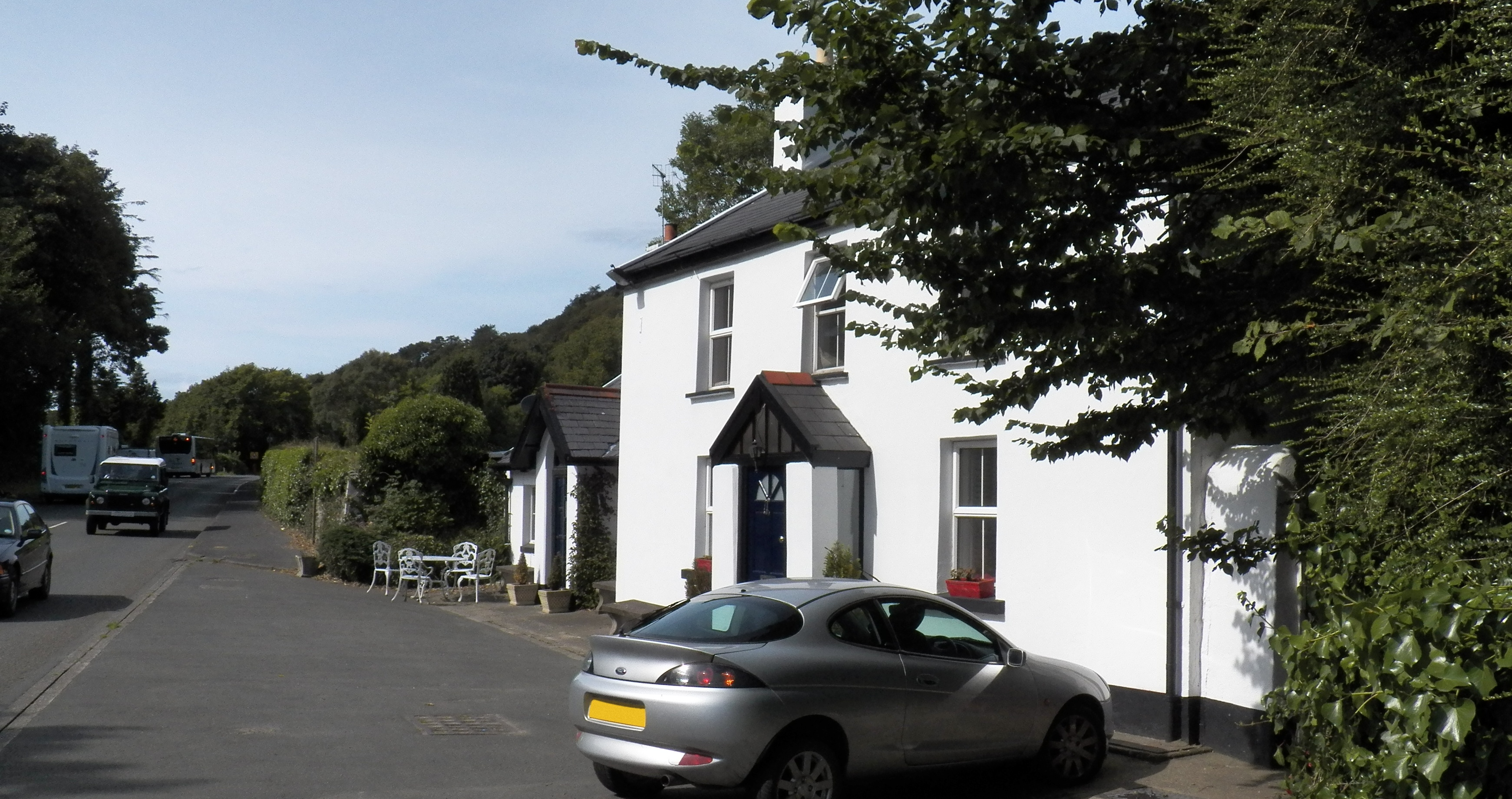
Highlander former public house

Highlander (in Manx: Keeill Brisht – The Broken Church) is situated between the 5th and 6th Milestone road-side markers on the Snaefell Mountain Course used for the Isle of Man TT races on the primary A1 Douglas to Peel road in the parish of Marown in the Isle of Man.

The site of a former coaching station, then a restaurant and now a private residence, it is situated in the main Douglas to Peel central valley, where the Greeba River and the former Douglas to Peel railway line run parallel to the A1 main road. The nearby area is mainly farmland with summits of Greeba Mountain 1,385 feet (422 m), Cronk Breck 804 feet (245 m), Cronk-ny-Moghlane 620 feet (189 m) and Slieau Ruy 1,572 feet (479 m) nearby.

The area is dominated by the nearby St. Trinian's Church ('Keeill Brisht') built as a chantry in the 14th century for the Priory of Ninian of Whithorn from a previous 12th century building on the site. The chapel fell into disrepair by the 17th century and is associated with the many tales of 'The Buggane of St. Trinian's' and the Highlander tailor who wagered that he could sew a coat sleeve in the haunted church.

The Highlander was part of the Four Inch Course used for the Tourist Trophy car races held in the Isle of Man between 1905 and 1922, and was part of the course used for 1905 International Motorcycle Cup races. It is part of the Snaefell Mountain Course used since 1911 for the TT and from 1923 for the Manx Grand Prix races.

A series of major safety revisions and alterations to the Snaefell Mountain Course occurred during the winter of 1953/54 in the Isle of Man. This included road widening and re-profiling by the Isle of Man Highway Board on the A1 road between Crosby and Greeba Castle. This included the Highlander area and its nearby jump, and the road jump adjacent to the nearby Ballagarraghyn Cottages were removed for the 1954 Isle of Man TT Races. During the 1954 Senior TT motorcycle solo competitor Simon Sandys-Winsch, a Corporal with the RAF, crashed fatally at the Highlander when riding a 350 cc Velocette in heavy rain and poor road conditions.
