= Simon Sandys-Winsch =

British motorcycle racer

- Nationality: English
- Born: 1926
- Died: 18 June 1954 (aged 27–28); Isle of Man
Motorcycle racing career statistics
Isle of Man TT career
TTs contested	1 (1954)
TT wins	0
TT podiums	0

Simon Ernest Edward Sandys-Winsch (1926 – 18 June 1954, died at the Highlander, Isle of Man) was an English professional motorcycle racer. He became the 48th person to be killed on the Snaefell Mountain Course, when he crashed at the Highlander on the first lap of the Senior TT during the 1954 Isle of Man TT.

Sanys-Winsch was from Brundell, Norfolk. In 1947, he started a long-serving term with the RAF. While stationed in Germany, he became a well-known competitor in European races and finished fifth in the 1951 Junior Dutch TT at Assen.

Sandys-Winsch also came joint 16th in the 1951 Grand Prix motorcycle racing season with two points, gained in the 350 cc section.

== 1954 Isle of Man TT ==
The start of the Senior race had already been delayed for at least an hour and a half due to bad weather and increasingly poor visibility. When the race finally started, Sandys-Winsch came off his 350 cc Junior class Velocette machine due to his speed and the wet conditions.

The race was shortened to only four laps because of the weather and the fatal accident. Eight other people were seriously injured in this race.
