= Victor Surridge =

British motorcycle racer

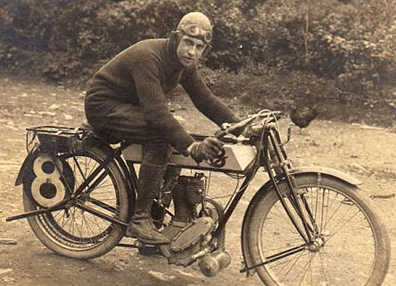
- Surridge in 1911
- Nationality: English
- Born: 1892; Chipping Ongar, Essex, England
- Died: 27 June 1911 (aged 18–19); Glen Helen, Isle of Man
Motorcycle racing career statistics
Isle of Man TT career
TTs contested	0
TT wins	0
First TT win	0
Last TT win	0
TT podiums	0

Victor John Surridge (1892 Chipping Ongar, Essex, UK – 27 June 1911 Glen Helen, Isle of Man) was an English motor-cycle racer who raced for the Rudge team. After the works Rudge factory team visited the Isle of Man TT Races for the first time, Surridge, while practicing for the 1911 Isle of Man TT Races, was killed on the Glen Helen section on the new Isle of Man TT Mountain Course used for the first-time in 1911.

From October 1910, Surridge had ridden as a trade representative for Rudge motor-cycles and held an hour motor-cycle record at Brooklands and fastest-lap. The accident to Surridge occurred on the steep left-hand corner at Glen Helen and occurred when Victor Surridge attempted to pass another competitor, ran wide into a ditch and struck an earth-bank. An inquest decided that the death of Surridge had probably been instantaneous and represented the first death of a competitor on the Isle of Man TT Mountain Course and the first death on the Island of a person in an automotive accident.
