= Rhencullen =

Place on the Isle of Man

- Location within Isle of Man
- 54°17′36.2″N 4°34′37.6″W

History
- Built: c.1790, 1954

Rhencullen (Manx: ‘holly ridge’) (locally /ˈrənˈkðlənˈ/) including Birkin's Bend is adjacent to the 17th milestone of the TT course, on the primary A3 Castletown to Ramsey road in the Isle of Man.

== Location ==
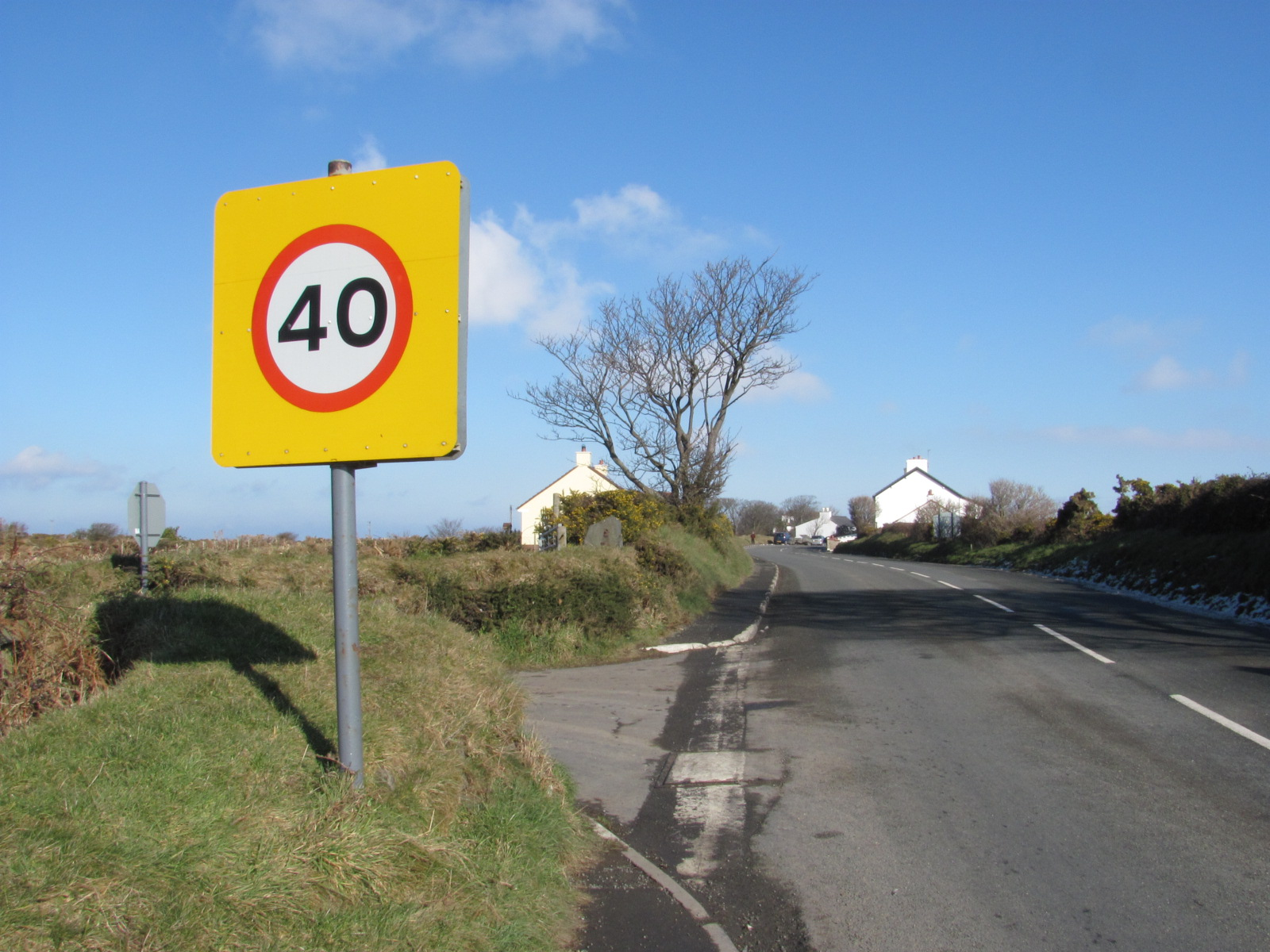
A3 Castletown to Ramsey Road and the junction with the C19 Orrisdale Loop Road, looking north towards Birkin's Bend and Rhencullen

Rhencullen (archaic Balla-ny-Rhenney beg) is a former quarterland district located between Kirk Michael village and Bishopscourt with the road junction of the tertiary C19 Orrisdale Loop road, in the parish of Michael. The area is dominated by the farmland at Ballarhenny and the Bishop's Demesne of Bishopscourt, including Birkin's Bend, 'Cloudy Lane' and Rhencullen Hill.

The disused Peel to Ramsey line of the former Manx Northern Railway runs parallel to the A3 road at Rhencullen in a cutting, now part of the Raad ny Foillan long-distance footpath. There is a house; named Ballawhatnot and it is built on the grounds of an executioners home. A tree is across the A3 road that was used to hang criminal that were charged guilty.

== Motor-sport heritage ==
The Rhencullen section was part of the 37.50 Mile Four Inch Course for the RAC Tourist Trophy automobile races held in the Isle of Man between 1908 and 1922.

In 1911, the Four Inch Course for automobiles was first used by the Auto-Cycling Union for the Isle of Man TT motorcycle races. This included Rhencullen (previously Orrisdale South) and the course later became known as the 37.73 mile Isle of Man TT Mountain Course, which has been used since 1911 for the Isle of Man TT Races and from 1923 for the Manx Grand Prix races.

=== Birkin’s bend ===
During an early morning practice session for the 1927 Isle of Man TT races, Archie Birkin, riding a 500 cc McEvoy motor-cycle, crashed fatally at Rhencullen after swerving to avoid a collision with a fish-van being driven on open public roads. The corner at Rhencullen on the A3 road where the accident occurred was named as 'Birkin's Bend'. From 1928 onward, practice sessions for the TT Races and Manx Grand Prix were held on closed public roads.

== Road improvements ==
The Rhencullen complex of bends including Birkin's Bend was subjected to extensive road widening and reprofiling by the Isle of Man Highway and Transport Board during the winter of 1953/1954 for the 1954 Isle of Man TT races.

== Gallery ==
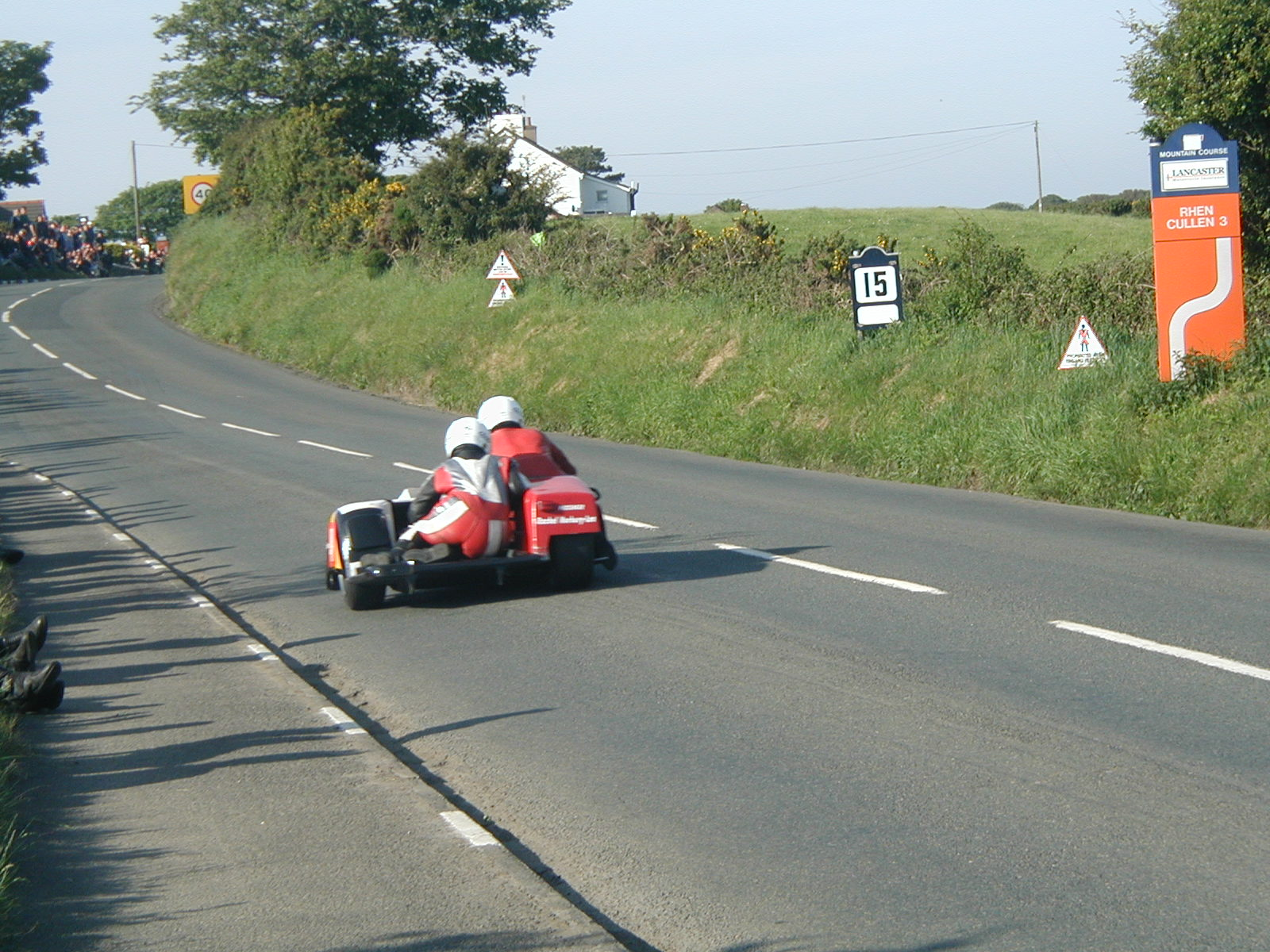
Sidecar crew approaching Rhencullen 3 in 2003

John McGuinness midway through Rhencullen in 2011
