= Birkin's Bend =

Road in the Isle of Man, part of a racing circuit

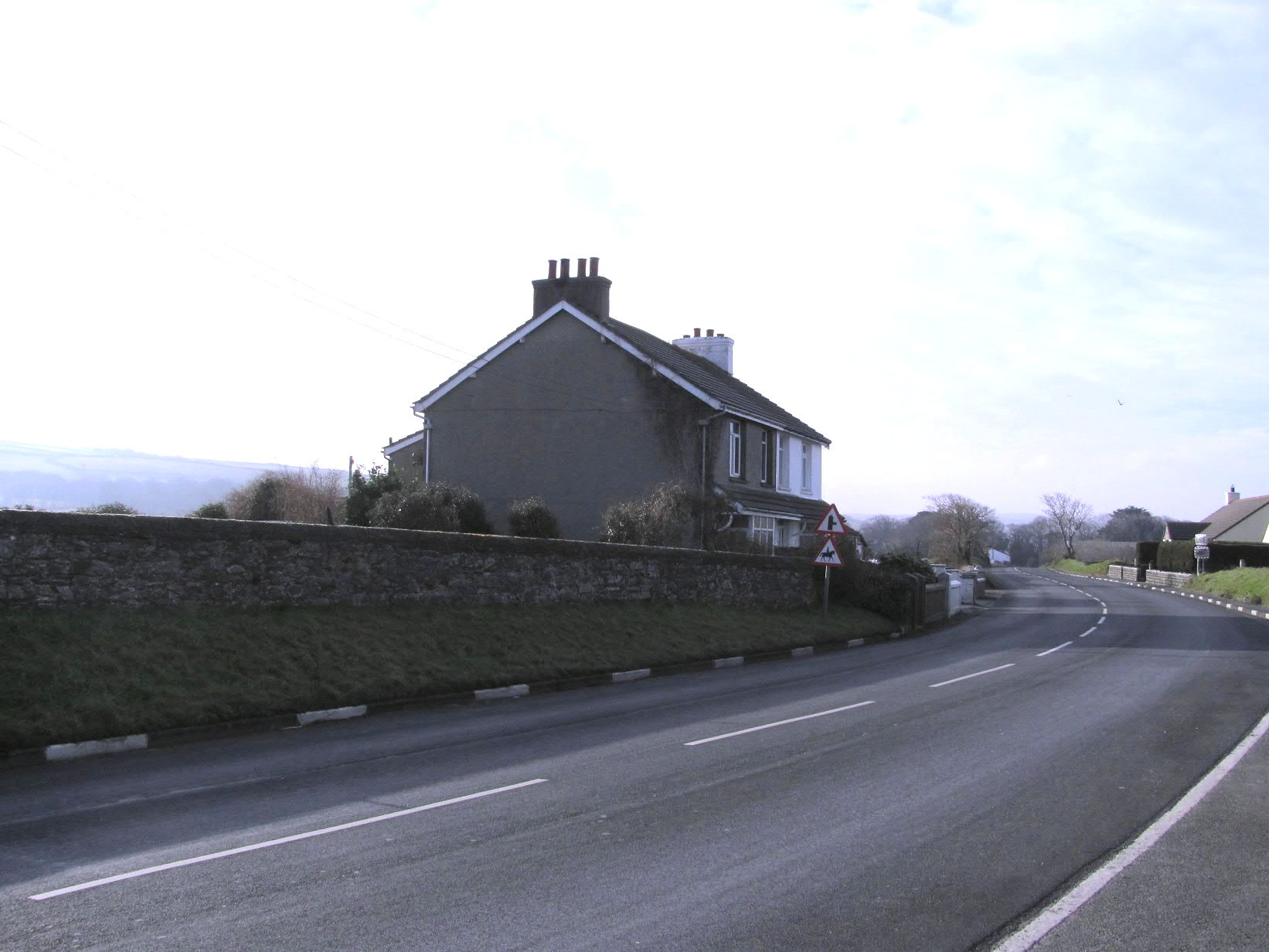
- Birkin's Bend on the A3 Castletown to Ramsey Road looking towards Rhencullen (1) and Kirk Michael Village.

- Location within Isle of Man
- 54°17′35.7″N 4°34′38.7″W

Birkin's Bend (previously Orrisdale South or Rhencullen) is situated adjacent to the 17th road milestone on the primary A3 Castletown to Ramsey road in the Isle of Man.

== Motor-sport heritage ==
The Rhencullen section was part of the 37.50 Mile Four Inch Course used for the RAC Tourist Trophy automobile races held in the Isle of Man between 1908 and 1922.

In 1911, the Four Inch Course for automobiles was first used by the Auto-Cycling Union for the Isle of Man TT motorcycle races. This included Rhencullen and the course later became known as the 37.73 mile Isle of Man TT Mountain Course which has been used since 1911 for the Isle of Man TT Races and from 1923 for the Manx Grand Prix races.

== Birkin’s bend ==
During an early morning practice session for the 1927 Isle of Man TT, Archie Birkin brother of Tim Birkin, one of the "Bentley Boys" of the 1920s, swerved to avoid a fish-van travelling to Peel on open roads to the public and crashed fatally against an off-side hedge. The corner at Rhencullen on the A3 road where the accident occurred was renamed as 'Birkins Bend.' From 1928 onwards, a significant change occurred with practice sessions for the Isle of Man TT Races and Manx Grand Prix were now held on closed public roads.

== Road improvements ==
The Rhencullen complex of bends including Birkin's Bend was subjected to road widening and re-profiling by the Isle of Man Highway and Transport Board during the winter of 1953/1954 prior to the 1954 Isle of Man TT races.
