= Killey =

Killey may refer to

- Philip G. Killey
- Killey River, a tributary to the left of the Kenai River
- Laurel Bank, also known as Cronk-y-Killey (Killey's Hill)
