= Laurel Bank =

- Location within Isle of Man
- 54°13′06.1″N 4°37′57.90″W

Laurel Bank (archaic Manx: Cronk-y-Killey - ‘Killey’s Hill’) is situated between the 10th Milestone and 11th Milestone road-side markers on the primary A3 Castletown to Ramsey Road between Ballacraine and Glen Helen in the parish of Kirk German in the Isle of Man.

== Description ==
The area of Laurel Bank is located in a former ‘Treen’ Old Norse: eyrisland (a sixteenth century legal, land or fiscal district for the payment of tax) of Balydoyne consisting of the Quarterlands of Cronk-y-Killey and Ballakilley-ny-Howin.

The area is located in the northern section of Glen Mooar valley in the parish of German including Laurel Bank farm and house (built c. 1848) and the Ebenezer Lane. The River Neb runs parallel to the Laurel Bank section of the A3 Castletown to Peel Road from Glen Helen to Ballacraine with the nearby summit of Beary Mountain 1,020 feet (311 m).

== Motor-sport heritage ==
The Glen Helen section of the A3 Castletown to Ramsey road including ‘Laurel Bank’ was part of the St. Johns Short Course used for the Isle of Man TT races between 1907 and 1910.

The ‘Laurel Bank' section was also part of the 37.50 Mile Four Inch Course for the RAC Tourist Trophy automobile races held in the Isle of Man between 1908 and 1922.

In 1911, the Four Inch Course for automobiles was first used by the Auto-Cycling Union for the Isle of Man TT motorcycle races. This included Laurel Bank and the course later became known as the 37.73 mile Isle of Man TT Mountain Course which has been used since 1911 for the Isle of Man TT Races and from 1923 for the Manx Grand Prix races.

During the 1962, Junior TT the former FIM World Motor-Cycle Champion, Tom Phillis riding a 285cc Honda crashed fatally at the approach to the Laurel Bank section of the TT Course.
