= Quarterbridge, Isle of Man =

Bridge in the Isle of Man

Coordinates: 54°09′21″N 4°30′06″W

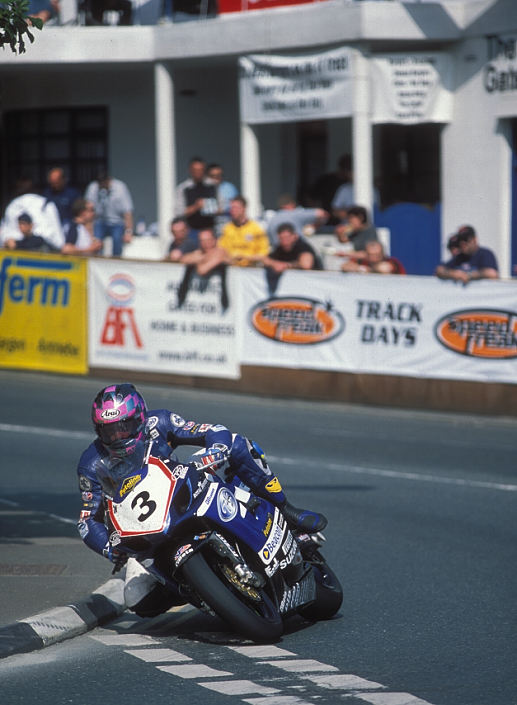
The Quarterbridge Road Junction with the A2 Quarterbridge Road and A1 Peel Road, Douglas.

Quarterbridge (Gaelic: Droichead an Cheathrú) (The Quarters or Quarter Dub: quarterlands of Ballabrooie and Ballaquayle) is situated soon after the 1 mile-marker measured from the TT Grandstand, part of the Snaefell Mountain Course used for the Isle of Man TT races, at the junction of the primary A1 Douglas to Peel road, A2 Douglas to Ramsey road and the A5 Douglas to Port Erin road which forms the boundary between the parishes of Braddan and Onchan in the Isle of Man.

== Name ==
The Quarterbridge forms the boundary between the quarterlands of Ballabrooie and Ballaquayle. A quarterland is an old land division in the Isle of Man, which includes a farmstead or Kerroo within the quarterland. In this system four of these divisions became a treen and land rights were entrusted to a landholder, who in turn cultivated one of the quarterlands. The three other quarterlands were rented to freemen paying dues in the form of rents, produce, parish services including the maintenance of a small church or keeil within the treen.

== History ==
The Quarterbridge spans the River Glass at this point and forms part of the boundary between the parishes of Braddan and Onchan. A bridge at this point was washed away during a storm in 1727 and replaced with a two-arched structure 30 yards downstream. The local mason Charles Scott was contracted in 1809 to build a single-arched span across the River Glass on the present alignment for a price of £280. The bridge was extended upstream in 1862 and there was a further extension downstream in the early 1900s. The public house on the site, The Union Hotel, was damaged by fire in 1830 and replaced by the present Quarterbridge Hotel. A gatehouse and nearby Quarterbridge rail-crossing were built in 1873 for the new Isle of Man Railway's Douglas to Peel line. Road widening on the A1 Peel Road during the winter of 1937 included the demolition of the Brown Bobby public house and road work at the Quarterbridge road junction. In the 1930s a distinctive roadside cafe was built in a modular prefabricated concrete Post-Modernist design on the junction with the A2 Quarterbridge Road. During the winter of 1953/54 road widening to the approach to the Quarterbridge occurred for the 1954 Isle of Man TT Races. In 1963 a roundabout was added to the road junction at the Quarterbridge. In winter 1986/87 there was further reprofiling at the Quarterbridge road junction, with a new road traffic system including two mini-roundabouts, and the removal of a traffic island and cherry trees. In July 2008, the Department of Transport announced a £4 million road safety scheme for the road junction, including the building of a new roundabout and the demolition of the Quarterbridge Hotel. In February/March 2011 the Highways Division of the Department of Infrastructure modified the junction, including major road resurfacing work, improved drainage, elevation changes and repositioning of pedestrian barriers adjacent to the Quarterbridge Hotel.

== Racing ==
The Quarterbridge was part of the Highland Course and Four Inch Course used for the Gordon Bennett Trial and Tourist Trophy car races between 1904 and 1922. The start-line for the Highland Course was at the Quarterbridge and junction with the A5 New Castletown Road and the Quarterbridge railway crossing. For the 1906 Isle of Man Tourist Trophy race the Highroad course was amended to a distance of 40.38 miles to prevent disruption to railway services. The start was moved from the Quarterbridge to the road junction of the A2 Quarterbridge Road/Alexander Drive adjacent to the property called 'Woodlands' in the town of Douglas. The startline for the 1908 Tourist Trophy was moved again from the A2 Quarterbridge Road to Hillberry Corner as part of the new Four Inch Course. The 1905 International Motorcycle Cup Races were held in the Isle of Man when the Quarterbridge was used as the start and finish line. The Quarterbridge road junction is part of the Mountain Course used since 1911 for the TT and from 1923 for the Manx Grand Prix races.

== See also ==
Quarterbridge Railway Crossing
