= 26th Milestone, Isle of Man =

Location on a road in the Isle of Man

Coordinates: 54°18′04″N 4°23′37″W

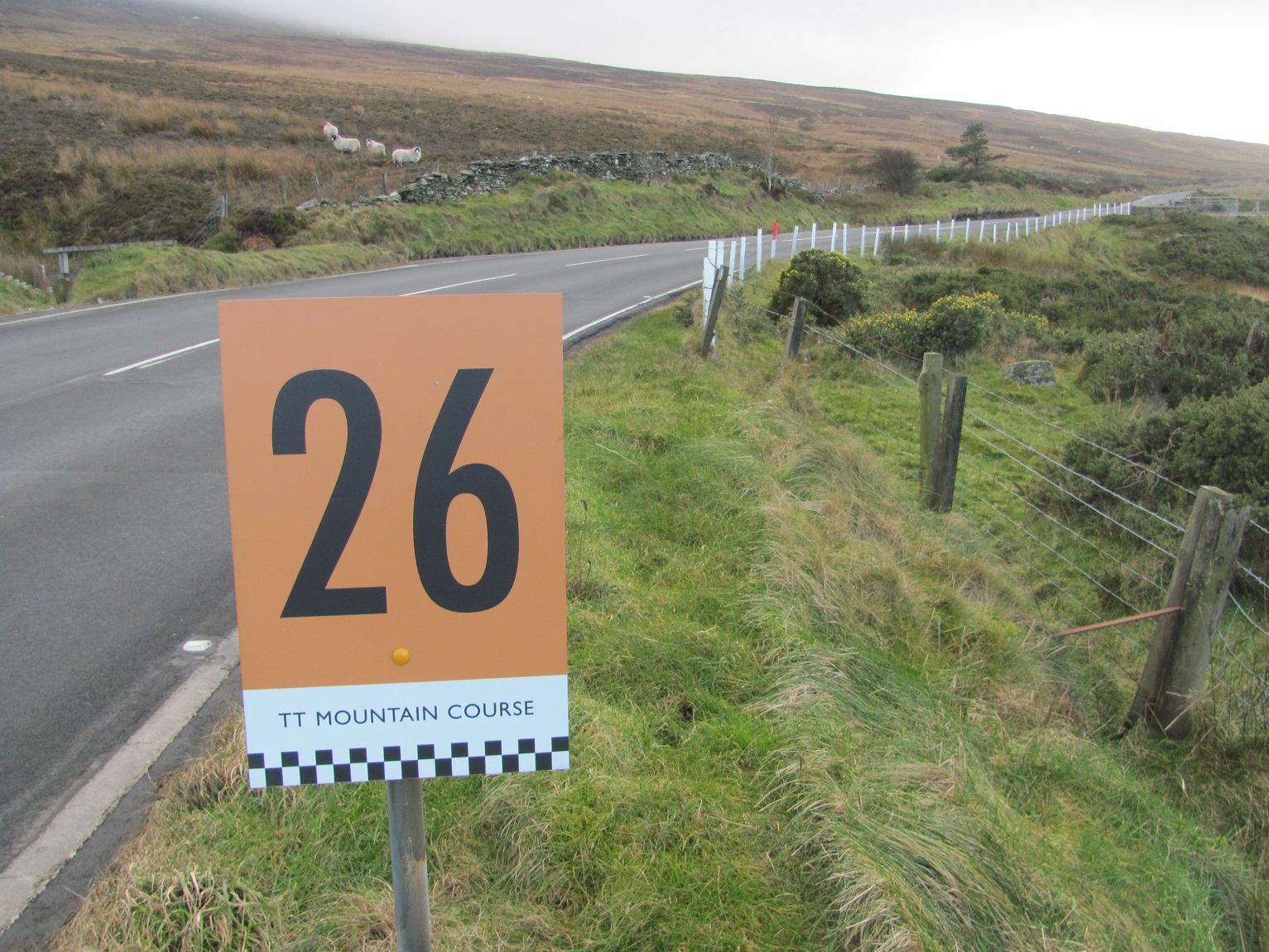
Joey's at the 26th Milestone on the A18 Snaefell Mountain Course looking towards Guthrie's Memorial

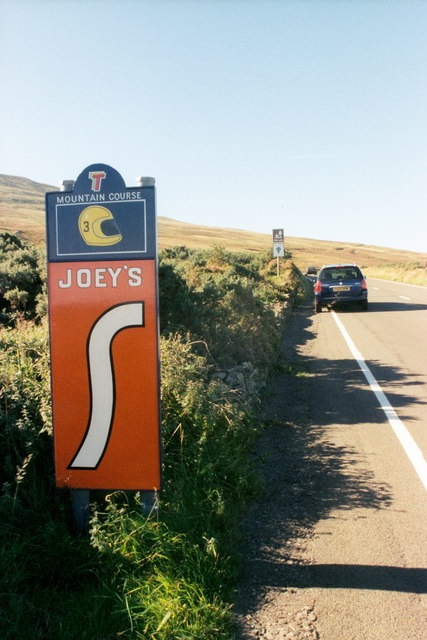
Signage approaching the corner

26th Milestone, Isle of Man (also known as Joey's) is situated on the primary A18 Snaefell Mountain Road in the parish of Lezayre in the Isle of Man. At the 26th Milestone racing marker used for the Isle of Man TT Races and Manx Grand Prix, the bend was named in honour of 26-times TT winner Joey Dunlop who died after a racing motorcycle crash in Estonia in July 2000. The area is the location of the only accident in which spectators at the Isle of Man TT races or Manx Grand Prix have been killed in a motorcycle racing accident.

== Racing ==
A serious fatal racing accident occurred at the 26th Milestone during the Centenary TT races in June, 2007 resulting in the death of a solo race competitor and two spectators during lap 5 of the Senior TT race. Newcomer-competitor Marc Ramsbotham riding a Suzuki and spectators Dean Jackob and Gregory Kenzig died, with TT race marshals Hilary Musson and Janice Phillips suffering injuries.

Safety work was carried out before the 2007 Manx Grand Prix in late August with the removal of part of a grass bank and a new race marshal's shelter created by the Isle of Man Department of Transport. During the winter of 2007, the 26th Milestone road-side marker, the A18 Mountain Road metal 13th milestone and Mountain Course marker board were also moved from the site.

Three-times British Supersport champion Karl Harris was killed in 2014 after a collision with another competitor at the 26th Milestone during the second lap of the Superstock TT race.

== A18 Snaefell Mountain Road ==
The 26th Milestone curve, situated on a steep up-hill section of the primary A18 Mountain Road, was part of the Highland Course and Four Inch Course used for the Gordon Bennett Trial and Tourist Trophy car races held between 1904 and 1911. The 26th Milestone is part of the Snaefell Mountain Course used since 1911 for the TT and Manx Grand Prix races.

The A18 Snaefell Mountain Road was developed in the mid-19th century from a number of pre-existing roads and bridle paths. This included the building of a number of sheep-gates including the East Mountain Gate, the Beinn-y-Phott sheep-gate and Keppel Gate. The primary A18 Mountain Road section road from Park Llewellyn (North Barrule) to Keppel Gate is a product of the Disafforesting Commission of 1860 and it reflects typical nineteenth century highway and railway construction practices which includes many small scale cuttings, embankments and revetments which follow land contours with purpose built graded-sections intersected by right-angle bends, road junctions and sheep-gates.

Improvements including road widening and landscaping occurred at the 26th Milestone for the 1938 TT races. A small-size metal milestone from the period of James Garrow as Isle of Man Surveyor-General was situated at the 26th Milestone as the 13th milestone marker on the primary A18 Snaefell Mountain Road.
