= Isle of Man TT Mountain Course =

Motorcycle circuit on the Isle of Man

Coordinates: 54°10′04″N 4°28′40″W

TT Mountain Circuit
- Route of the TT Course
- Location: Douglas, Isle of Man
- Major events: Isle of Man TT; Manx Grand Prix; Sidecar World Championship (1960–1976)
- Length: 37.728 mi (60.718 km)
- Turns: 219
- Race lap record: 16:36.114 seconds – 136.358 mph (219.447 km/h) average (Peter Hickman, BMW M1000RR, 2023)

The Isle of Man TT Mountain Course, also known as the TT Course or Snaefell Mountain Course, is a street and public rural road circuit located in the Isle of Man, used for motorcycle racing. The motorcycle TT Course is used principally for the Isle of Man TT Races and also the separate event of the Isle of Man Festival of Motorcycling for the Manx Grand Prix and Classic TT Races held in September of each year. The start-line for the Isle of Man TT Mountain Course is located on Glencrutchery Road in the City of Douglas, Isle of Man.

The clockwise course has a lap of 37.730 mi (60.721 km), from the start line at the TT Grandstand on Glencrutchery Road (A2 Ramsey to Douglas) in the island's main town of Douglas. After negotiating urban streets, the racing circuit turns right to leave Douglas at Quarter Bridge, then proceeds along the A1 Douglas to Peel Road from Braddan Bridge, through the villages of Union Mills, Glen Vine, Crosby, and Greeba. The course then turns right at Ballacraine on to the A3 Castletown to Ramsey road, firstly through countryside glens followed by agricultural land interspersed by the villages of Kirk Michael, Ballaugh and Sulby, finally intersecting with the A18 Snaefell mountain road after negotiating urban streets in the town of Ramsey. The A18 then takes the course back to Douglas through the highest point, situated after the Bungalow at Hailwood's Height near the 31st Milestone and the UK Ordnance Survey spot height of 1,385 ft (422 m) above sea level. The descent starts through countryside before entering the residential outskirts of Douglas back to the finish line.

== History ==
Motor racing began on the Isle of Man in 1904 with the Gordon Bennett Trial and originally was restricted to touring automobiles. As the UK Motor Car Act 1903 placed a speed restriction of 20 mph (32 km/h) on cars within the United Kingdom, the Secretary of the Automobile Club of Britain and Ireland approached the authorities in the Isle of Man to seek permission to race cars on public roads. The Highways (Light Locomotives) Act 1904 passed by Tynwald gave permission to use local roads for the 52.15 mi (83.93 km) Highroads Course for the 1904 Gordon Bennett Trial.

For the 1905 Gordon Bennett Car event it was decided to run a trial for motor-cycles the day after for a team to represent Great Britain in the International Motor-Cycle Cup Races. The inability of the motorcycle competitors to climb the steep primary A18 Snaefell Mountain Road section of the course forced the organisers to use a 25-mile (40 km) section of the Gordon Bennett Trial course. For this reason, the 1907 Isle of Man TT Race used the 15 mi (24 km) St. John's Short Course. The 1906 Isle of Man Tourist Trophy Race for automobiles the Highroad Course was reduced from 52.15 mi (83.93 km) to 40.38 mi (64.99 km). For the 1908 Tourist Trophy race for automobiles, the course was again reduced to 37.50 mi (60.35 km) with the removal of the Peel and Sandygate loops and was known as the Four Inch Course. The name of the course derives from the regulations for the 1908 Tourist Trophy adopted by the Royal Automobile Club which limited the engines of the competing automobiles to a cylinder diameter of 4 inches (100 mm). The Four-Inch Course was adopted by the Auto-Cycle Club for the 1911 races. The Four-Inch Course subsequently became known as the Isle of Man TT Mountain Course or TT Course when used for motor-cycle racing.

=== Course changes: 1920–1939 ===
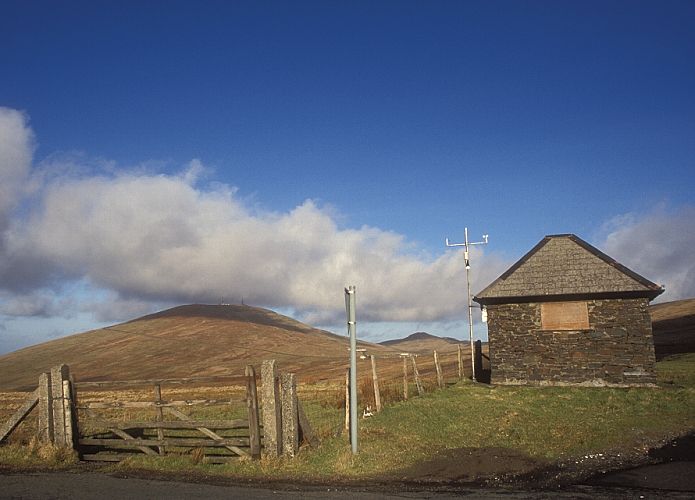
Brandywell TT Race Marshal Shelter and Weather Station on the A18 Mountain Road/B10 Sartfield Road looking north towards Snaefell Mountain and North Barrule

For the 1919 Isle of Man TT, changes were made to the Mountain Course and competitors turned left at Cronk-ny-Mona and followed the primary A18 Mountain Road to Governor's Bridge with a new start/finish line on Glencrutchery Road which lengthened the course from the pre-World War I length of 37.50 mi (60.35 km) to 37.75 mi (60.75 km). An extensive programme of road improvements occurred to many roads in 1922 by the Highway Board including the Mountain Course with road widening at Sulby Bridge, from Port-e-Chee on the A1 Peel Road to Braddan Bridge and part of the main road through Crosby. Modification of Signpost Corner including rounding off the bend occurred in 1922 along with further road widening at Governor's Bridge with the completion of the link road to A2 Glencrutchery Road/Governor's Road and the removal of fence posts at Keppel Gate. Further changes to the course followed in 1922 with the adoption of a private road part of the Ballastowle Estate between Parliament Square and May Hill in Ramsey. The course had previously had negotiated the A2 Albert Road and Tower Road in Ramsey and the new course length was now 37.739 mi (60.735 km). The official course distance for the Snaefell Mountain Course was amended in 1938 to 37.73 mi (60.72 km) which is the current course length.

For the 1934 Isle of Man TT races major alterations to the TT Mountain Course were carried out which included the removal of the East Snaefell Mountain sheep-gate. This was followed by the removal of the hump-backed bridge at Ballig and the road work was completed for the Manx Grand Prix in September 1935. Road widening occurred on the Mountain Course at the Highlander, Laurel Bank, Glen Helen (between the Old Quarry and Brew's Restaurant), and at Brandywell with the removal of the Beinn-y-Phott sheep-gate for the 1935 Isle of Man TT races. Road Improvements occurred at the 26th Milestone, Greeba Bridge and on the Sulby Straight for the 1938 Isle of Man TT races. Further road widening and landscaping occurred at the Waterworks with road widening between the Gooseneck and the 26th Milestone for the 1939 races. A memorial to Jimmie Guthrie was built in 1939 at The Cutting at a cost of £1,500 (equivalent to £85,000 in 2025).

=== Course changes: 1947–1999 ===
Route of the Clypse Course used 1954–1959

Major road widening occurred on the Mountain course at the 33rd Milestone, including the removal of fence posts at road level and the removal of a section of a grass bank before the start of the 1947 Isle of Man TT races. Changes to the Mountain Course occurred for the 1953 races including road widening at Bedstead Corner, elevation works at Signpost Corner and Cronk-ny-Mona, and the widening of the corner at Gorse Lea. Before the commencement of racing for the 1953 Manx Grand Prix, the cottage at Appledene Corner was demolished between the 6th and 7th Milestone road-side marker on the primary A1 Douglas to Peel road on the Mountain Course. Further changes occurred to the Mountain Course to facilitate racing on the Clypse Course and during the winter of 1953/54 road widening occurred on the primary A18 Mountain Road at Creg-ny-Baa, Signpost Corner, Cronk-ny-Mona, and at the approach to Governor's Bridge. The approach to the Quarterbridge on the primary A2 Douglas to Peel road was widened and re-profiled and the jumps at the Highlander and adjacent to Ballagarraghyn Cottages were removed for the 1954 Isle of Man TT Races. Other major course alterations for the 1954 Isle of Man TT Races included road widening at Appledene, Handley's Corner, Barregarrow, Rhencullen, Ballaugh Bridge, Ginger Hall (Sulby), and Kerrowmoar. During the winter of 1957/58 the hotel at the Bungalow tram-crossing was removed on the Mountain Section of the course.

During the 1960s further road-widening occurred at Ballig and also at Greeba Bridge on the primary A1 Douglas to Peel road. In 1963 a roundabout was added to the road junction at the Quarterbridge. The winter of 1970/1971 and road-widening occurred on the A18 Mountain Road at Verandah by cutting into the hillside. During the winter of 1975/76 road-widening and landscaping by the Isle of Man Highway Board occurred at Snugbrough on the primary A2 road at the 2nd Milestone. The winter of 1986 further re-profiling occurred at the Quarterbridge road junction with a new road traffic system including two new mini-roundabouts, the removal of a traffic island, and trees. Road re-profiling and widening occurred at Quarry Bends during the winter of 1987. During the winter months of 1991/1992 the A18 Mountain Road was closed for repair work to the road foundation between the 26th Milestone and the Mountain Box and also between the Windy Corner and Keppel Gate.

=== Course changes: 2000–present ===
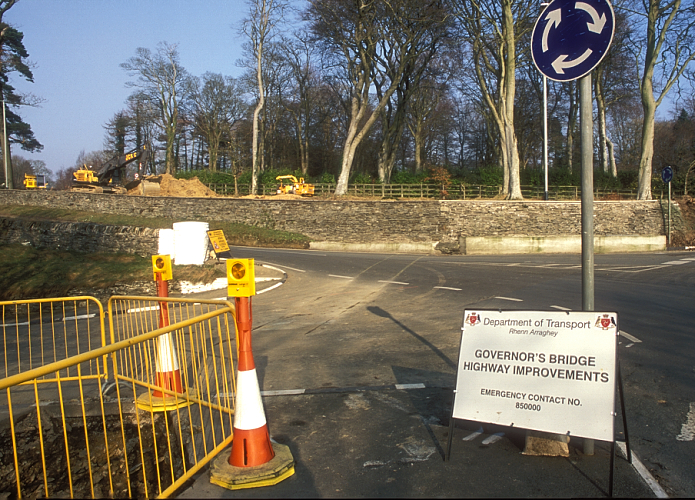
Governor's Bridge road junction between the A18 Bemahague Road and the A2 Governor's Road

From 2003 to 2006, road repair work was carried-out on the primary A3 road from Barregarrow to Cronk-y-Voddy, including Handley's Corner and the 11th Milestone. In 2004 the western-side embankment is removed from Guthrie's Memorial on the A18 Mountain Road. Also, during the winter of 2004/2005 road widening occurred at Windy Corner followed by Brandish Corner during the winter of 2005/2006 by the Department of Transport. In October 2007 the Department of Transport began road widening at Braddan Bridge on the Mountain Course with the creation of a new roundabout incorporating the 'Jubilee Oak' Tree on the A1 Douglas to Peel Road. The Department of Transport also announced the proposal of building a new section of road and roundabout for the Mountain Course with a link road from Signpost Corner to Governor's Bridge using the existing A18 Bemahague Road. This road widening scheme began in February 2008 with the removal of trees on the Bemahague Estate which included Government House, the official residence of the Lieutenant Governor, and the creation of a small mini-roundabout. Further work by the Department of Transport in July and September 2008 included a storm drain and the completion of the mini-roundabout. The TT races and Manx Grand Prix continued to use the original A18 Bemahague Road that runs parallel to the new link road and the Governor's Dip for motorcycle racing. In July 2008, the Department of Transport announced a £4 Million road safety scheme for the Quarterbridge road junction, including the building of a new roundabout and the demolition of the Quarterbridge Hotel. In August 2009, for the 2009 Manx Grand Prix a section of grass bank is removed from the southern side of Keppel Gate. This was to provide a run-off area after a practice crash by the Australian TT competitor Cameron Donald and a further more serious incident involving Travelling Marshal John McBride at Keppel Gate during the 2009 Isle of Man TT races.

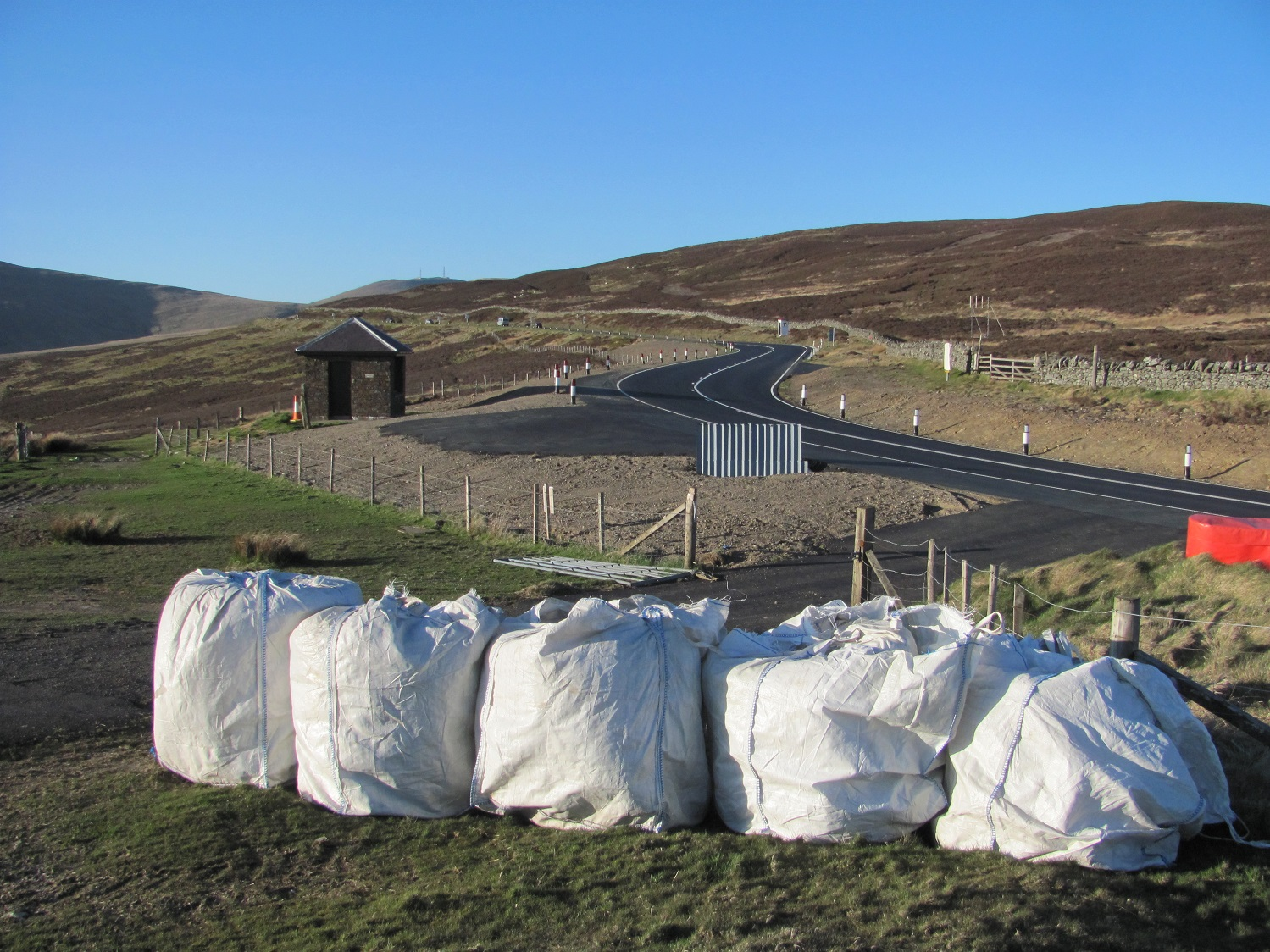
Keppel Gate and Keppel Park showing the 2015 landscaping

During the winter of 2010, further road construction and repair work was carried out by the Isle of Man Department of Infrastructure Highways Division, and the Isle of Man Water Authority between Cronk Urleigh and the 13th Milestone. This was followed by major road resurfacing work between the 13th Milestone and Westwood Corner near Kirk Michael, Barregarrow Hill, and Sulby Straight from Kella Crossroads to Sulby Bridge during the spring of 2011. The Highways Division modified the road junction at Signpost Corner including improved drainage, elevation changes, and repairs to the road surface in November 2010 and the same major repair process of road resurfacing was repeated for the Quarter Bridge road junction in February 2011. The Department of Infrastructure during the winter of 2011/2012 removed and re-positioned roadside fence-posts from Brandywell to the 32nd Milestone and from Windy Corner to the 33rd Milestone. During the winter of 2012/2013 the stone TT Marshal shelter at Guthrie's Memorial was demolished. The roadway at Hillberry Corner underwent repairs to the carriageway and was resurfaced and re-profiled by the Isle of Man Department of Infrastructure, Highways Division during the spring of 2014. In April 2015, the Highways Division instigated a programme of landscaping at Keppel Gate including the removal of a small grass bank on the north-eastern side of the corner, road re-profiling and re-surfacing work.

== Official lap records ==
The outright lap record for the TT Mountain Course is 16 minutes and 36.115 seconds at an average of 136.358 mph (219.447 km/h). This was set by Peter Hickman on a BMW M1000RR Superstock bike during the 2023 Superstock TT Race Two.

The lap record for the Senior TT race is 16 minutes and 42.778 seconds at an average speed of 135.452 mph (217.989 km/h) set by Peter Hickman during the 2018 Senior TT Race. The race record is also held by Hickman in 1 hour, 43 minutes and 08,065 seconds; an average race speed of 131.700 mph (211.951 km/h) achieved during the same 6 lap Senior TT race.

The lap record for the Sidecar TT race is 18 minutes and 42.350 seconds at an average speed of 121.021 mph (194.764 km/h) set by Ryan Crowe and passenger Callum Crowe during the 2025 Sidecar TT Race 1. The race record for the Sidecar TT is 56 minutes and 41.816 seconds, an average race speed of 119.784 mph (192.774 km/h) for 3 laps (113.00 miles) of the Mountain Course is held by Ben and Tom Birchall, during the 2023 Sidecar TT Race 2.

In the 2006 TT practice New Zealander Bruce Anstey achieved the unofficial current top speed record of 206 mph (332 km/h) at the end of Sulby straight on a Suzuki 1000cc machine. This speed value was registered by the on-board datalogging equipment.

=== Race lap records ===
Category	Time	Driver	Vehicle	Event
Circuit: 60.718 km (1908–present)
Superbike	16:42.778	Peter Hickman	BMW S1000RR	2018 Isle of Man TT
Formula 750	20:09.8	John Williams	Suzuki TR750	1976 Isle of Man TT
350cc	20:49.6	Tony Rutter	Yamaha TZ 350	1976 Isle of Man TT
250cc	21:27.8	Tom Herron	Yamaha TZ 250	1976 Isle of Man TT
500cc	21:45	John Surtees	MV Agusta 500 4C	1960 Isle of Man TT
Sidecar (B2A)	23:13	Helmut Fath; Siegfried Schauzu	BMW; Aro Fath sidecar	1960 Isle of Man TT; 1976 Isle of Man TT
125cc	26:17.6	Carlo Ubbiali	MV Agusta 125 Bialbero	1960 Isle of Man TT
Grand Prix	39:15	Henry Segrave	1922 Sunbeam	1922 R.A.C. Isle of Man Tourist Trophy
Voiturette	41:04	Algernon Lee Guinness	Talbot-Darracq 56	1922 Isle of Man Voiturette race

== Cycling ==
The same course has also been used for cycle racing, including individual time trials and, from 1936, the Manx International massed-start road race. The first race held on 18 June 1936 was won by Charles Holland of the Midland Cycle and Athletics Club in 1 hour, 42 minutes and 57 seconds for one lap of the Mountain Course. In May 2017 it was announced that the circuit would be used for the 2017 British National Road Race Championships in June of that year, two weeks after the TT races.

The cycling absolute lap record for the Mountain Course was broken in 2015 by Isle of Man born professional cyclist Peter Kennaugh in a time of 1 hour, 23 minutes and 48 seconds, beating the previous longstanding record, set by former Olympic cyclist Chris Boardman in 1993, by 6 seconds.

== Cars ==
On 6 June 1990 Tony Pond completed the first 100 mph (160 km/h) average-speed lap in 22 minutes, 9.1 seconds driving a Rover 827 Vitesse.

In 2011 Mark Higgins completed a lap in 19 minutes, 56.67 seconds at an average speed over 113 mph (182 km/h) driving a USAC Rally America specification Prodrive prepared 4-door Subaru WRX STI.

In 2014 Mark Higgins broke his own record driving a 2015 model Subaru WRX STI with a lap time of 19 minutes, 15.88 at an average speed of 117.510 mph (189.114 km/h).

On 4 June 2016 Higgins improved on his record with a lap in 17 minutes 49.75 seconds, an average speed of 126.971 mph (204.340 km/h) driving a 2016 model of the same car. Then a few days later he went even quicker completing the lap in 17 minutes 35 seconds, an average speed of 128.73 mph (207.17 km/h).

== Named corners ==
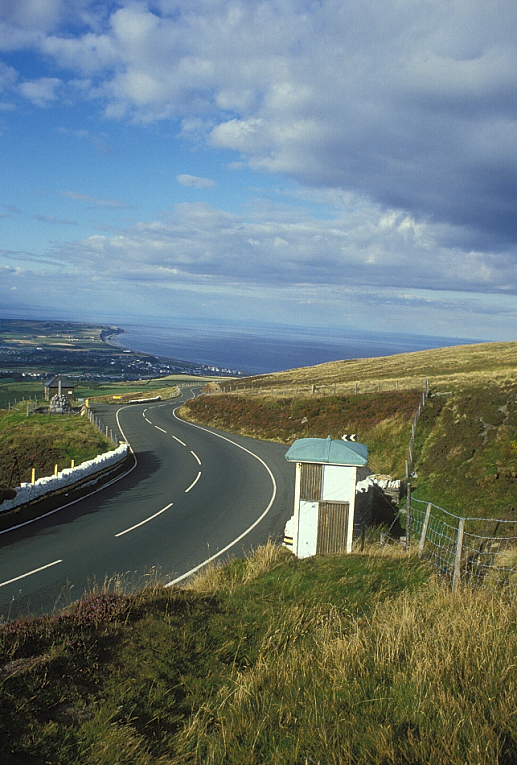
TT Race Marshal Signal Box on the A18 Mountain Road looking north towards Guthrie's Memorial and the Point of Ayre

There are 219 corners on the Mountain Course with about 60 named corners, some named after individuals. The first corner to be named after a competitor was Edges Corner in 1920 on the primary A21 Johnny Watterson's Lane on the Mountain Course between Cronk-ny-Mona and the A22 Ballanard Road in Douglas used for racing between 1911 and 1922.

Part of the TT Course was renamed Brandish Corner after Walter Brandish crashed in the right-hand gutter while trying to pass another competitor at Upper Hillberry Corner (previously Telegraph Hill) between Creg-ny-Baa and Hillberry Corner and broke a leg during practice for the 1923 TT races. During an early morning practice session for the 1927 TT, Archie Birkin swerved in Kirk Michael village to avoid a fish-van travelling to Peel on the primary A3 road, collided with a wall and was killed. The corner was then named Birkin's Bend, and afterwards, from 1928, practice sessions for the TT races and Manx Grand Prix were held on closed roads. The Ballameanagh Corner between the 11th Milestone and the 12th Milestone was renamed Handley's Corner after Wal Handley, riding a Rudge motorcycle, crashed during lap 1 of the 1932 TT Senior race, sustained a back injury and subsequently retired from the race. In 1939 a stone memorial to Jimmie Guthrie was built at The Cutting on the A18 Snaefell Mountain Road and the S-bend corner was renamed Guthrie's Memorial.

Following a crash during an evening practice session for the 1950 Isle of Man TT races by Bill Doran between Ballig Bridge and Laurel Bank, the corner was named Doran's Bend. A stone shelter in a style of a small mountain Alpine Lodge was built in 1955 as a memorial to Les Graham, the inaugural 500 cc World Champion solo motorcyclist, on the A18 Mountain Road. The corner is named Les Graham Memorial or sometimes referred to as the Bungalow Bridge.

The uphill section of the Mountain Course from the Bungalow to the highest point of the course near Brandywell was named in 1981 as Hailwood's Rise, in memory of Mike Hailwood, the former world motorcycle champion, and the highest point of the course preceding the Brandywell road junction was named Hailwood's Height. In 2003 the 32nd Milestone was named Duke's, after the 1950s world solo motorcycle champion Geoff Duke, and the 26th Milestone was named Joey's after the former Formula 1 TT motor-cycle champion Joey Dunlop, who tallied 26 race wins.

In 2013 the Isle of Man Government took the unusual step of naming corners after active competitors, with 23 times TT winner John McGuinness, and Dave Molyneux, the most successful Manxman with 17 wins, being honoured.

The latest corners to be named have been named in honour of non-riders who have demonstrated a dedication to the TT. These include Ray Caley, former operator of the shop and post office at the junction of the course with Sulby Glen road who died in 2017. Caley's Corner is at the beginning of Sulby Straight. In 2019 Harold Leece was recognised for his garden hospitality to TT spectators with his name on a directional marker board. Harold's corner is the 170 mph right hand bend as the riders approach Gorse Lea.

== Safety ==
Between 1911 and 2025 there have been 270 rider competitor fatalities during official practices or races on the Isle of Man TT Mountain Course (this number includes the riders killed during the Manx Grand Prix, and Clubman TT race series of the late 1940s/1950s). The first fatality on the TT Course was near Glen Helen during practice for the 1911 TT when Victor Surridge, a works Rudge-Whitworth rider, crashed heavily and died of his injuries. This was also possibly the first death in the Isle of Man of a person in a motorcycle or other road-vehicle accident.

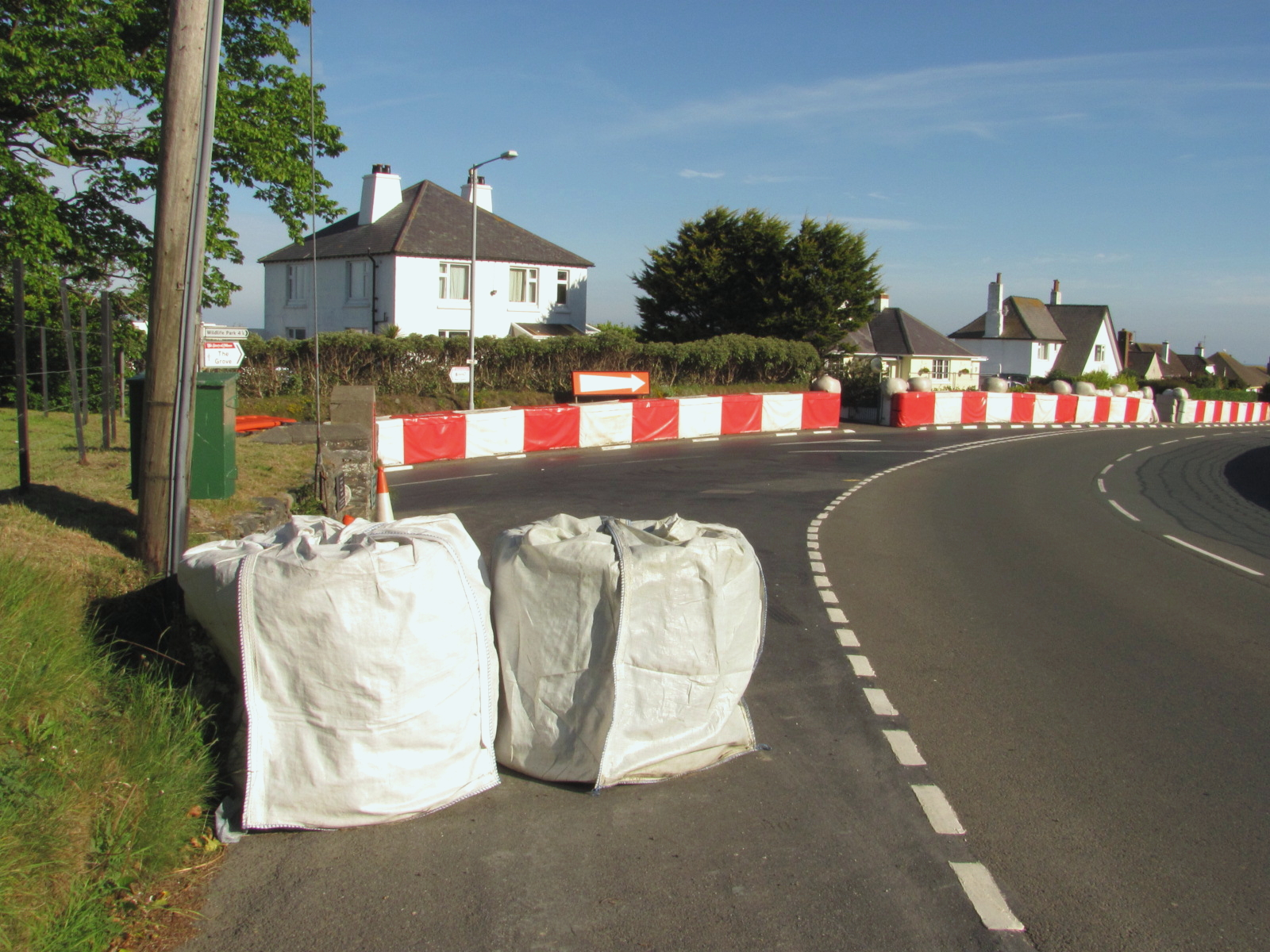
The A3 Castletown to Ramsey road approaching Douglas Road Corner, Kirk Michael with safety air fencing on the outside of the bend

The compulsory use of crash helmets for the 1914 Isle of Man TT motor-cycle races was the result of a fatal accident to Frank Bateman on the Keppel Gate section of the TT Course near to Kates Cottage during the 1913 Senior TT race. The first introduction of a flag to signify the end of an Isle of Man TT race was as a result of a fatal accident to Fred Walker near to the finish line of the 1914 Junior TT motor-cycle race after crashing into course boundary boards at St. Ninians Crossroads and Ballaquayle Road in the town of Douglas.

During an early morning practice session for the 1927 Isle of Man TT races, Archie Birkin, brother of Tim Birkin of the Bentley Boys fame, crashed fatally at Rhencullen after swerving to avoid a collision with a Fish Van being driven on open roads. From 1928 onwards, practice sessions for the Isle of Man TT Races and Manx Grand Prix were held on closed public roads.

During the first lap of the 1934 Lightweight TT race, Syd Crabtree, European Grand Prix competitor and winner of the 1929 Lightweight TT, crashed fatally in heavy hill fog on the Mountain section of the TT Course near to the Stonebreakers Hut on the Verandah section of the course. For the 1935 Isle of Man TT races, two motorcycle-equipped Travelling Marshals were employed to search for missing riders, particularly in poor weather conditions on the Mountain section of the TT Course. After a fatal crash by Doug J. Pirie, in poor visibility caused by mountain mist and fog near to the 33rd TT Milestone during the 1935 Lightweight TT, races were delayed or postponed to the next day until the weather improved. The first evening practice sessions were introduced for the 1937 Isle of Man TT races which continue to this day.

Further changes to the Mountain Course occurred during the winter of 1953/54 as the result of fatalities to competitors during the TT races and Manx Grand Prix from 1951 to 1953. Changes were also made to facilitate the return of Sidecar TT on the new Clypse Course. On safety grounds, 'seeding' of competitors occurred for the 1959 TT race. The Thursday afternoon practice session from 13:45–17:00 pm introduced in the late 1950s was discontinued for the Centenary 2007 Isle of Man TT races. Also during the late 1950s, Appledene Cottage was demolished on safety grounds along with Old Brew's Restaurant near Glen Helen during the early 1960s accompanied by a road widening programme at Greeba Bridge.

There were six fatalities among the competitors at the 1970 Isle of Man TT, including world championship contender Santiago Herrero, making 1970 the deadliest year in the history of the event. Further road safety work during the winter of 1970/1971 road-widening occurred at the Verandah series of bends and also at the Bungalow Bridge by the Isle of Man Highway Board cutting into the hillside. Despite the safety improvements to the Verandah section, while lying in first place on the second lap during the 1972 Isle of Man TT 125 cc Ultra-Lightweight TT race held in heavy rain, Gilberto Parlotti crashed his 125 cc Morbidelli at the Verandah and later died from his injuries. From 1973, any weather conditions that would not allow a rescue helicopter to take-off or land would lead to the race start being delayed or postponed at any TT or Manx Grand Prix race.

The A2 Quarterbridge Road including the road junctions at Selborne Drive and Brunswick Drive and the A2 Bray Hill were subjected to major road repairs and re-profiling during the winter of 1978/79 by the Isle of Man Highway Board. This followed a series of fatal accidents during the start of the 1978 Sidecar TT 'A' race, to the Swiss sidecar competitor Ernst Trachsel on Quarterbridge Road, and the sidecar crew of Mac Hobson & Kenny Birch on nearby Bray Hill. For the 1979 TT races the practice of starting competitors in pairs was abandoned followed by the Manx Grand Prix in 2011 after the result of fatal crash at Alpine Cottage during the 2010 Junior Manx Grand Prix.

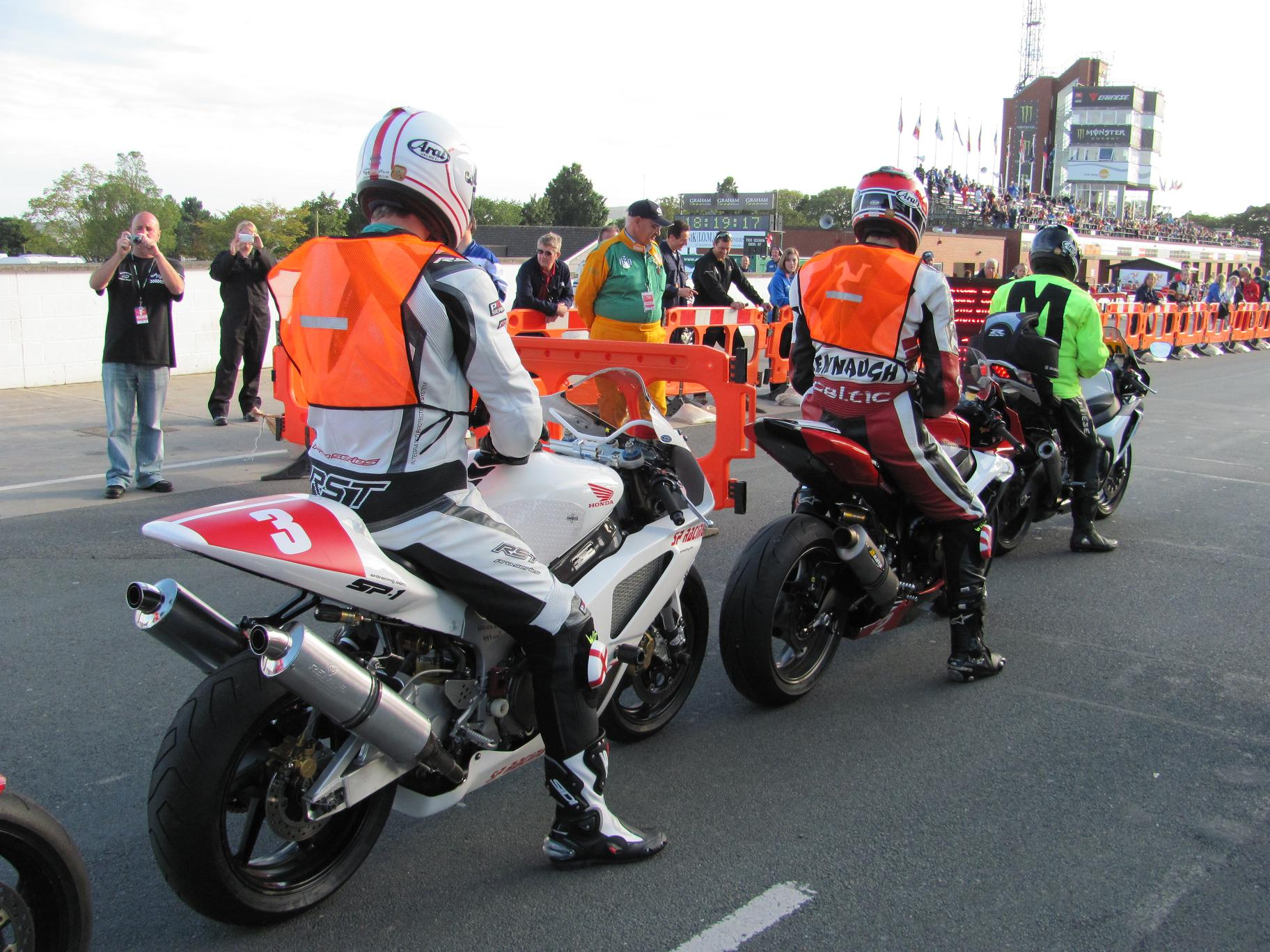
Competitors at the TT Grandstand waiting for the start of the Newcomers Speed Control Lap (denoted by Hi-Visibility orange tabards) for the 2010 Manx Grand Prix

Following a fatal accident to French newcomer Serge le Moal during the first practice session of the 2004 Isle of Man TT races, a Newcomers Speed Control Lap was introduced for the 2004 Manx Grand Prix followed by the 2005 TT races. A mandatory TT Mountain Course licence for Isle of Man TT and Manx Grand Prix competitors was introduced for 2006. During the winter of 2004/2005 road widening by the Isle of Man Department of Transport occurred at Windy Corner followed by Brandish Corner during the winter of 2005/2006, included a slightly banked section and a constant radius curve as a safety improvement for general road traffic. A serious accident occurred at the 26th Milestone during the 2007 Isle of Man TT Centenary races on lap 5 of the Senior race resulting in the deaths of a competitor and two visiting spectators.

After a series of safety reviews, a number of general measures were introduced after 2007 for the Isle of Man TT races and the Manx Grand Prix and other events such as the Southern 100 motor-cycle races and the Rally Isle of Man. This included the introduction of restricted areas, safety fencing and the continued introduction of air-fencing to corners to the Isle of Man TT Mountain Course. Following the start of the 2013 Senior TT race, a competitor lost control on the steep descent of Bray Hill and the racing motor-cycle collided with a wall and spectators' safety area near the junction of Bray Hill and Cronkbourne Road in the town of Douglas, injuring 11 spectators. During an evening practice session for the 2018 Isle of Man TT, a race competitor received serious injuries after colliding with a course inspection car near to Ballacrye Corner in Ballaugh parish when travelling in a group of race competitors in the reverse course direction. The incident occurred following a red-flag incident near Sky Hill (Churchtown) after a fatal accident to Isle of Man competitor, Dan Kneen. Following a meeting of the Strategic Motorsport Group organised by the Isle of Man Government, the Clerk of Course announced procedural changes to red flag incidents. Competitors would now wait on the course until the incident had been cleared and only travel in 'course direction' accompanied by TT Travelling Marshals at the front and rear of the convoy. After a further legal review by the ACU in 2018 into the cause of the accident and the collision with a course inspection car a number of safety changes were initiated. This included the creation of a new event safety officer and GPS tracking to be fitted to all course inspection cars.

== See also ==
- List of Isle of Man TT Mountain Course fatalities
- Isle of Man TT Races
- Manx Grand Prix
- Clypse Course
- St. John's Short Course
