= Ballagarraghyn =

Farm in the Isle of Man

- Location within Isle of Man
- 54°12′01″N 4°37′23″W

Ballagarraghyn (Manx: [baləˈɡɑɾəxən], "farm of O'Dorchan's") is a farm situated between the 7th milestone and 8th Milestone road-side markers on the primary A1 Douglas to Peel road in the parish of German in the Isle of Man.

== Motor-sport heritage ==
The Ballagarraghyn section of the A1 Douglas to Peel road was part of the short Highland Course (40.38 miles) from 1906 and the also the 37.50 Mile Four Inch Course used for car racing including the RAC Tourist Trophy car races held between 1906 and 1922.

A section of the Douglas to Peel road from Ballacraine to Quarterbridge, Douglas, including Ballagarraghyn was used for the 1905 International Motor-Cycle Cup Races.

In 1911, the Four Inch Course was first used by the Auto-Cycling Union for the Isle of Man TT motorcycle races. This included the Ballagarraghyn and Gorse Lea section and the course later became known as the 37.73 mile Isle of Man TT Mountain Course which has been used since 1911 for the Isle of Man TT Races and from 1923 for the Manx Grand Prix races.

== Road improvements ==
The Greeba section on the primary A2 Douglas to Peel road was widened and reprofiled and the road jumps at the Highlander and also adjacent to Ballagarraghyn Cottages were removed for the 1954 Isle of Man TT races.
