= Guthrie's Memorial, Isle of Man =

Guthrie's Memorial
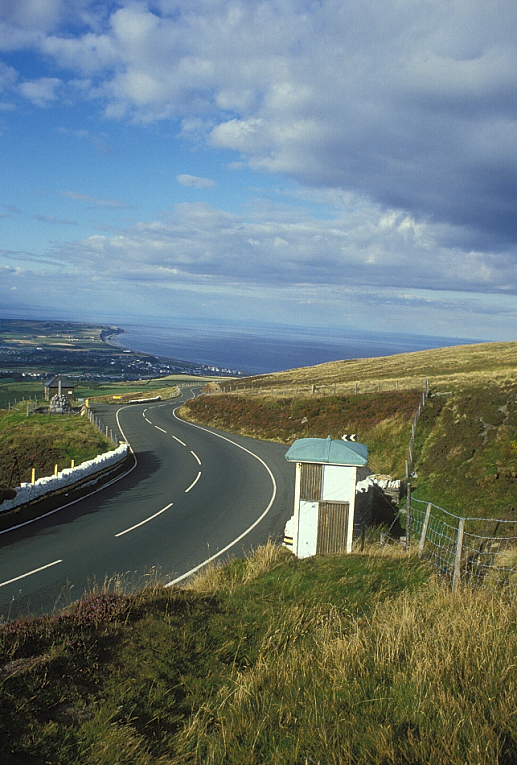
- TT race marshal's signal box on the A18 Snaefell mountain road looking north (in the opposite direction to a lap of the course) towards Guthrie's Memorial on the left and the Point of Ayre in the distance

- Location within Isle of Man
- 54°17′46.2″N 4°24′20.8″W

History
- Built: 1860–1870, 1939

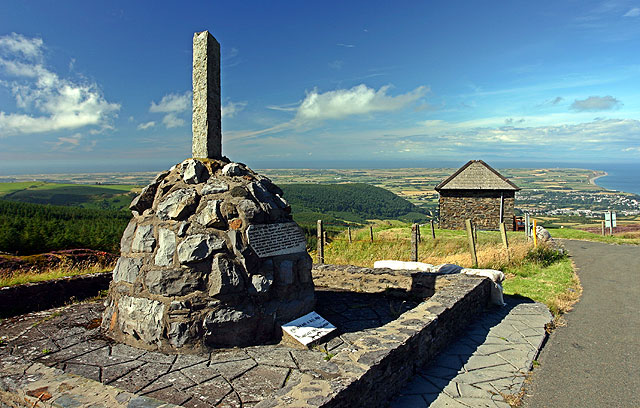
The memorial

Guthrie's Memorial (previously The Cutting) is a S-bend corner between the 26 and 27 mile road-side markers on the primary A18 Snaefell mountain road, part of the Snaefell Mountain Course known mainly for motorcycle racing, situated in the Isle of Man parish of Lezayre.

== A18 Snaefell Mountain Road ==
The A18 Snaefell mountain road was developed in the mid-nineteenth century from a number of existing roads, carting-tracks and bridle paths. This included installation of a number of sheep-gates, milestones, the building of a series of embankments, revetments, purpose built graded sections which reflected nineteenth century highway and railway building practices. This included the distinctive road embankments which gave the S-bend corner the previous name of The Cutting. This section of the A18 Snaefell Mountain Road from the Keppel Gate to Park Mooar / Park Llewellyn (North Barrule) was built on common grazing land that were transferred to the UK Crown following the sale of the Islands feudal rights by the Duke of Atholl after the Disafforesting Commission of 1860. The nearby revetment and embankment at the 27th Milestone is sometimes informally referred to as the Guthrie's Bridge.

The western side embankment at Guthrie's Memorial was removed during the winter of 2004/2005 by the Department of Transport as a road traffic improvement, followed by a small section of the north-eastern embankment in April 2009.

During the winter of 2012/2013 the stone TT Marshall's shelter at Guthrie's Memorial was demolished.

== Motor-Sport Heritage ==
During the 1937 TT races, Jimmie Guthrie won the Junior race, but retired on lap five of the Senior race at The Cutting section of the course. After crashing fatally during the 1937 German Grand Prix a memorial to Jimmie Guthrie was built in 1939 at The Cutting. Funded by public subscription, the memorial was built at the place where he retired in his last TT race.

The inscription on the memorial reads:

James Guthrie 1897–1937 Erected to the memory of Jimmy Guthrie, of Hawick, a brilliant motor cycle rider, famous on the Isle of Man Tourist Trophy Course for his wonderful riding and great sportsmanship. He won the race six times, beat many world's records and was first in numerous foreign races. He died while upholding the honour of his country in the German Grand Prix, August, 1937.

A further memorial called the "Guthrie Stone" was established in 1949 at the site of the fatal accident on the Sachsenring road course, near the German village of Hohenstein-Ernstthal.

== Gallery ==
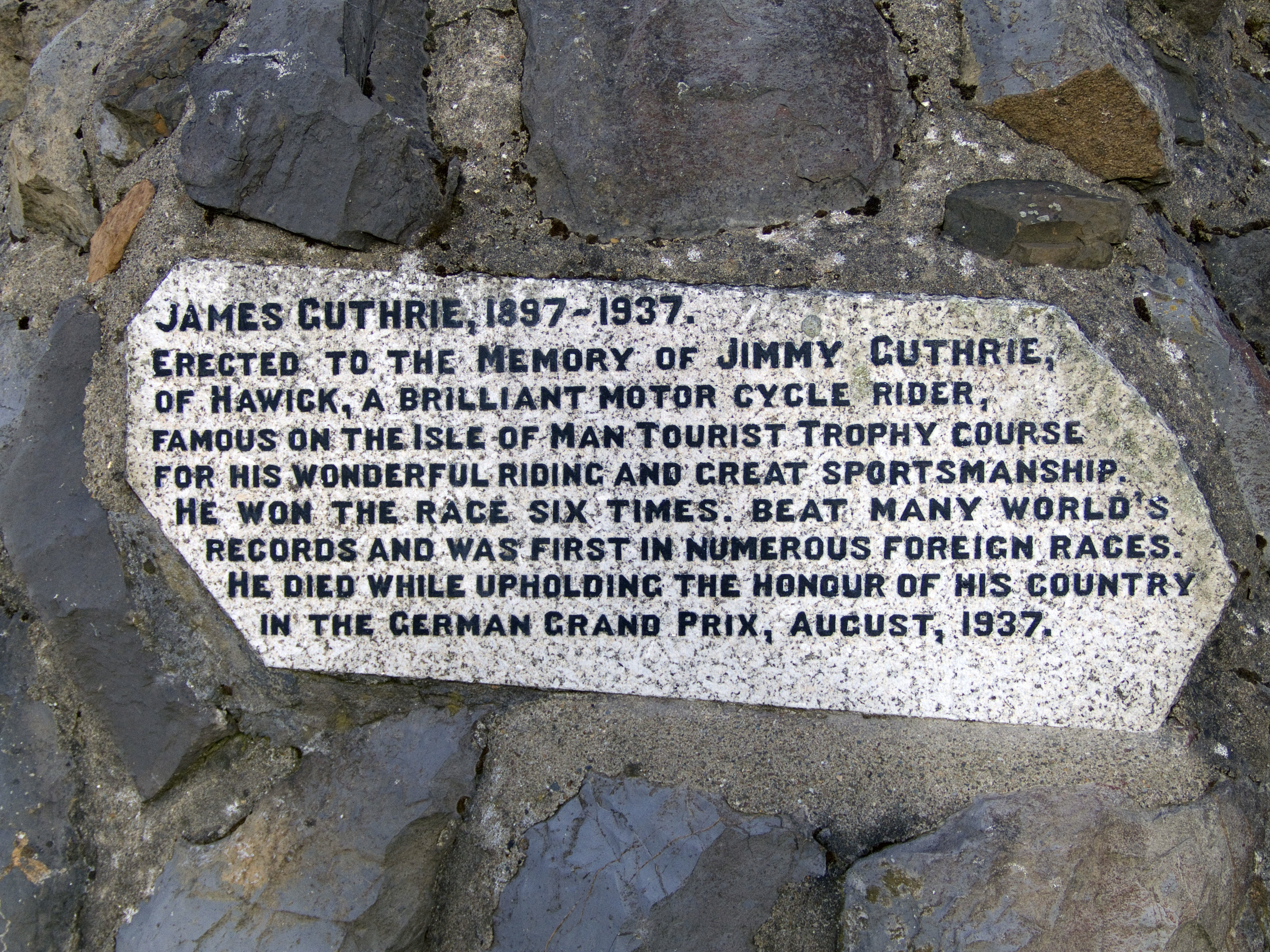
The inscription on the memorial
