= Brandish Corner =

Notable curve in the parish of Onchan in the Isle of Man

Coordinates: 54°11′44″N 4°28′40″W

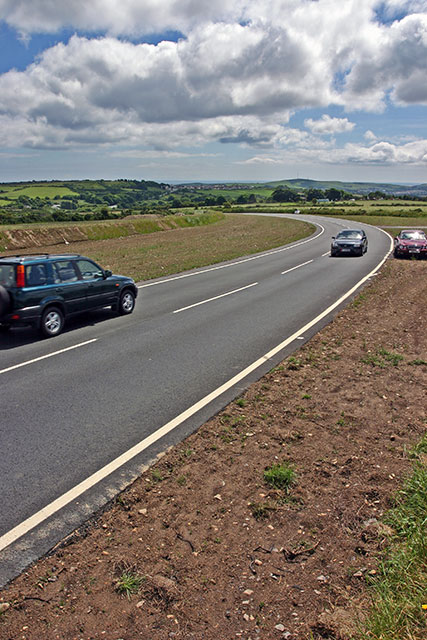
Brandish, looking in the general direction of Douglas, towards the end of the lap of the TT course showing newly instated side-verges in 2007 after completion of roadworks

Brandish Corner (formerly known as Upper-Hillberry Corner and previously Telegraph Hill) is situated between the 35th and 36th Milestone road-side markers on the Snaefell Mountain Course on the primary A18 Mountain Road in the parish of Onchan in the Isle of Man. The road was re-engineered in recent years.

Brandish Corner was part of the Highland Course and Four Inch Course used for the Gordon Bennett Trial and Tourist Trophy car races held between 1904 and 1922. Brandish Corner is part of the Snaefell Mountain Course used since 1911 for the Isle of Man TT and Manx Grand Prix races.

This part of the Mountain Course was named Brandish Corner after Walter Brandish who crashed in the right-hand gutter while trying to pass another competitor at Upper Hilberry Corner, between Creg-ny-Baa and Hillberry Corner, and broke a leg during practice for the 1923 Isle of Man TT Races.

During the winter of 2005/2006 road widening occurred at Windy Corner followed by Brandish Corner during the autumn of 2006 by the Isle of Man Department of Transport, due to collision figures at both locations involving local, two-way traffic.
