= Cronk-ny-Mona =

Coordinates: 54°11′00″N 4°28′33″W

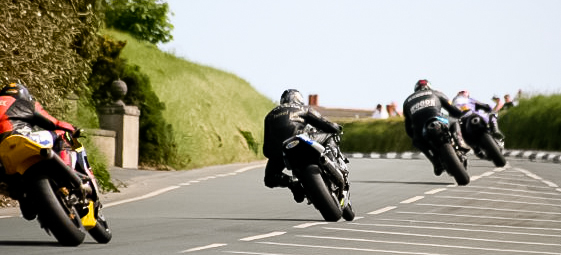
Cronk-ny-Mona near to the top of the rise

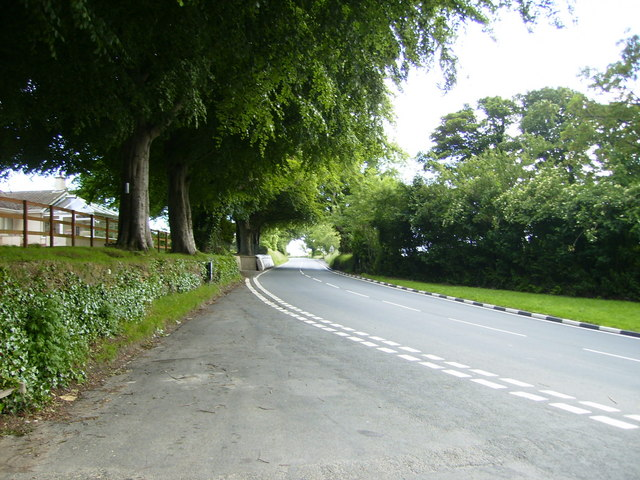
Looking up towards Cronk-ny-Mona in the Douglas direction from the base of the hill at Hillberry

Cronk-ny-Mona (Manx for 'Hill of the turbary') is situated between the 36 and 37 mile markers used for the Snaefell Mountain Course, being on the primary A18 Mountain Road at the road junction with the A21 Johnny Watterson('s) Lane and the tertiary C10 Scholag Road in the Isle of Man parish of Onchan.

Cronk-ny-Mona, a steep hill topping-out to a sweeping left hand bend located after Hillberry corner on the TT course, leads from agricultural farmland and passes through sympathetically-landscaped modern residential developments on either side, continuing the traditional rural theme and demarking the outer-margins of Douglas town. The hill interrupts the descent from Snaefell Mountain, which resumes at the next TT vantage point, the right turn at Signpost Corner, starting the run down through the outskirts of Douglas to the finish line at TT Grandstand.

== History ==
Cronk-ny-Mona was part of the Highland Course and Four Inch Course used for the Gordon Bennett Trial and Tourist Trophy car races between 1904 and 1922, and part of the Mountain Course used since 1911 for the Isle of Man TT and from 1923 for the Manx Grand Prix races.

For the 1920 TT races, changes were made to the Mountain Course requiring competitors to turn left at Cronk-ny-Mona, following the primary A18 Mountain Road to Governor's Bridge Dip with a new start/finish line on Glencrutchery Road which lengthened the course to 37¾ miles. To facilitate racing on the Clypse Course, for the 1954 TT races, during the winter of 1953/54 road widening occurred on the Mountain Course at Creg-ny-Baa along with Signpost Corner, the section of road from Hillberry corner to Cronk-ny-Mona, and the approach to Governor's Bridge.
