= Hillberry Corner =

Coordinates: 54°11′16″N 4°28′32″W

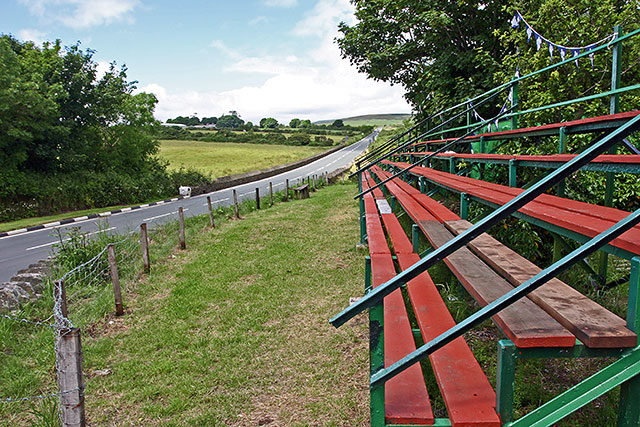
Hillberry approach, exiting to the left of camera position, with the left-hander of Brandish in the far distance

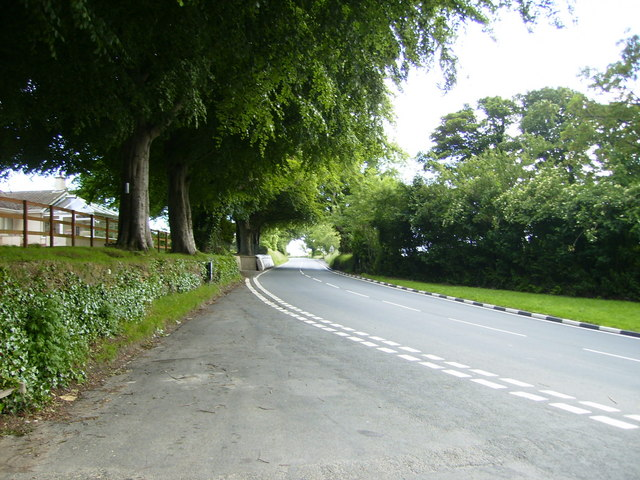
Hillberry exiting towards Cronk-ny-Mona and Douglas town beyond

Hillberry Corner (in Manx: Knock berrey or Cronkybury) is situated at the 36th Milestone road-side marker on the Snaefell Mountain Course, being on the primary A18 Mountain Road with the side-road junction of the C22 Little Mill Road, in the parish of Onchan in the Isle of Man.

Hillberry Corner was part of the Highland Course and Four Inch Course used for the Gordon Bennett Trial and Tourist Trophy car races between 1904 and 1922. For the 1908 Tourist Trophy race for cars, the startline was moved from the road junction of the A2 Quarterbridge Road/Alexander Drive to Hillberry Corner as part of the new Four Inch Course. A small iron-framed grandstand was built for spectators and still remains at the site. Hillberry Corner is part of the Mountain Course used since 1911 for the Isle of Man TT and Manx Grand Prix races.

To facilitate racing on the Clypse Course for the 1954 TT races during the winter of 1953/54 road widening occurred on the Mountain Course at Creg-ny-Baa, Signpost Corner, the section of road from Hillberry Corner to Cronk-ny-Mona, and the approach to Governor's Bridge.
