= Talbot-Darracq 56 =

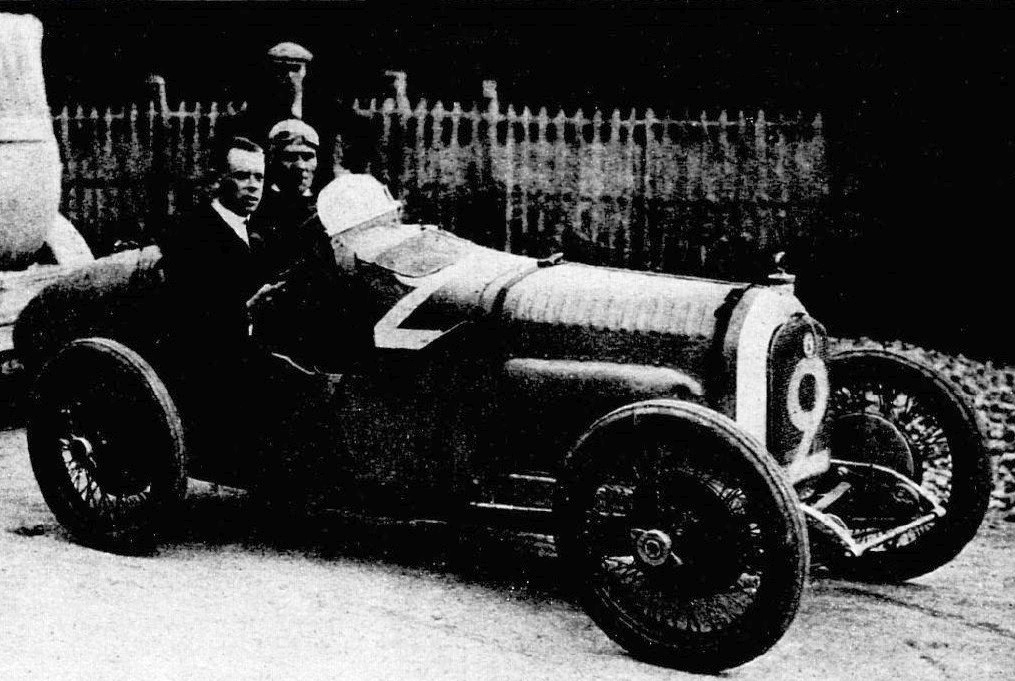

Overview
- Manufacturer: Talbot-Darracq
- Production: 1921–1922

Body and chassis
- Class: Voiturette
- Layout: FR layout

Powertrain
- Engine: 1.5 L (92 cu in) I4 DOHC; 53 hp (40 kW) @ 4000 rpm (naturally-aspirated)
- Transmission: 4-speed manual

Dimensions
- Wheelbase: 96 in (2,438 mm)
- Curb weight: 1,456 lb (660 kg)

The Talbot-Darracq 56 was a voiturette racecar, designed, developed and built by British-French manufacturer Talbot-Darracq, in 1921.

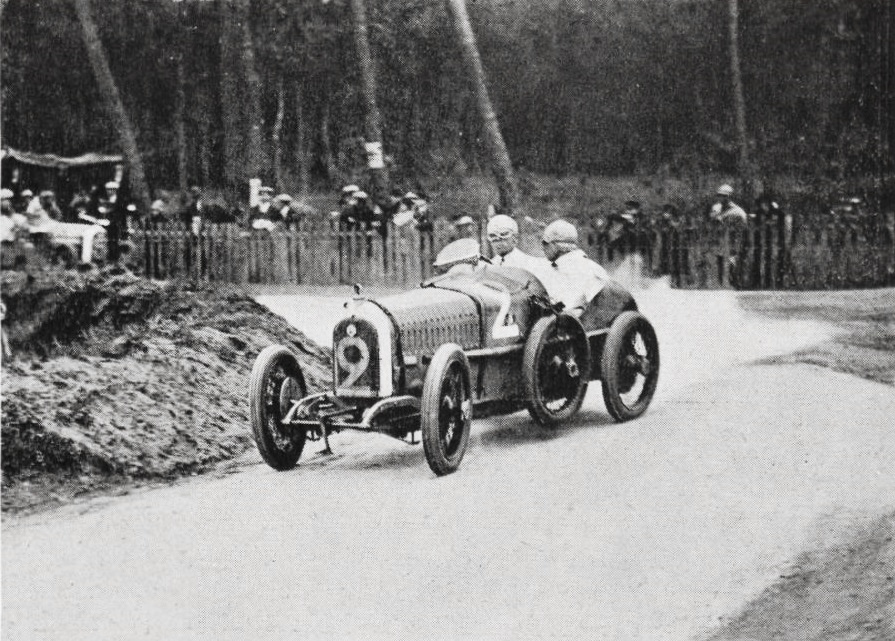
Kenelm Lee Guinness driving a Talbot-Darracq 56 at the French voiturette race, Le Mans, September 1922.
