= Glen Helen, Isle of Man =

Glen Helen
- Location within Isle of Man
- 54°13′33.2″N 4°37′01.3″W

Glen Helen (formerly Manx: Glen Rhenass (locally /ˈrənˈɑːsˈ/) or Lambfell Glen) is one of a series of eighteen Manx National Glens owned and maintained by the Forestry Amenity and Lands Directorate of the Isle of Man Department of Environment, Food and Agriculture.

== Location ==
Glen Helen is located in the Rhenass valley and the glen entrance is situated between the 11th Milestone and 12th Milestone road-side markers on the primary A3 Castletown to Ramsey Road between Laurel Bank and Sarah’s Cottage in the parish of Kirk German in the Isle of Man.

The national glen contains two waterfalls and is the confluence of the Lambfell stream, Blaber River and the River Neb at the road-side entrance of the Glen Helen national glen. The area of Glen Helen is part of the southern slopes of Lambfell Mountain.

== History ==
The glen was developed in the 1860s by a consortium of Manx businessmen interested in arboriculture. They carried out extensive planting of trees and ornamental shrubs, laid paths, constructed river bridges and opened the site to the public in 1867. The attractive name Glen Helen was probably chosen from Greek myth to reflect the beauty of the location.

Today a variety of mature and impressive trees including sequoia, thuja, spruces, Douglas fir, oak, sycamore and beech can be seen. Paths traverse the glen along the rivers Neb and Blaber. Three-quarters of a mile into the glen is the dramatic Rhenass Waterfall.

The national glen of an area of 67 acres and associated buildings were purchased by the Isle of Man Forestry, Land and Mines Board in 1958 for a cost of £4,300.

== Motor-sport heritage ==
The Glen Helen section of the A3 Castletown to Ramsey road was part of the St John's Short Course used for the Isle of Man TT races between 1907 and 1910.

The Glen Helen section of the A3 Castletown to Ramsey was also part of the 37.50 Mile Four Inch Course for the RAC Tourist Trophy automobile races held in the Isle of Man between 1908 and 1922.

In 1911, the Four Inch Course for automobiles was first used by the Auto-Cycling Union for the Isle of Man TT motorcycle races. This included the Glen Helen section of Laurel Bank, Black Dub, Sarah’s Cottage and ‘Creg Willey’s Hill’ and the course later became known as the 37.73 mile (60.70 km) Isle of Man TT Mountain Course which has been used since 1911 for the Isle of Man TT Races and from 1923 for the Manx Grand Prix races.

== Gallery ==
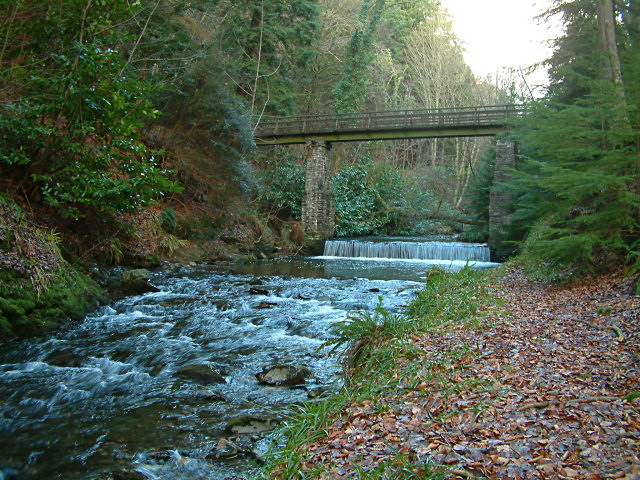
River Neb with footbridge

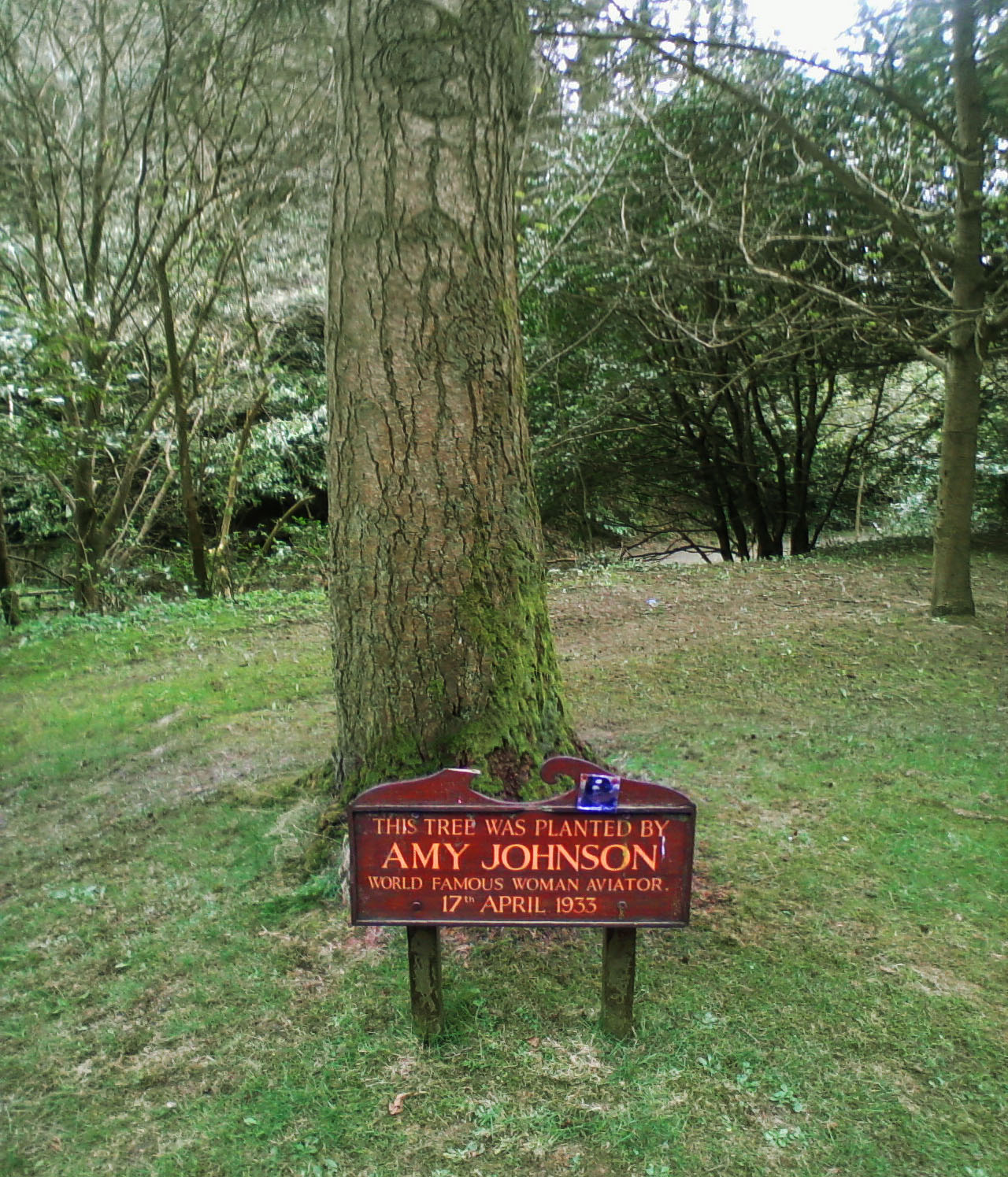
A tree at the mouth of the glen planted in 1933 by aviator Amy Johnson

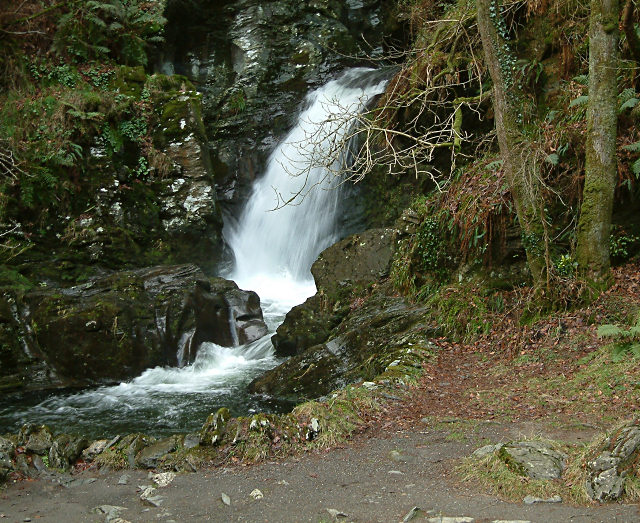
The Rhenass Falls at the top end of the glen

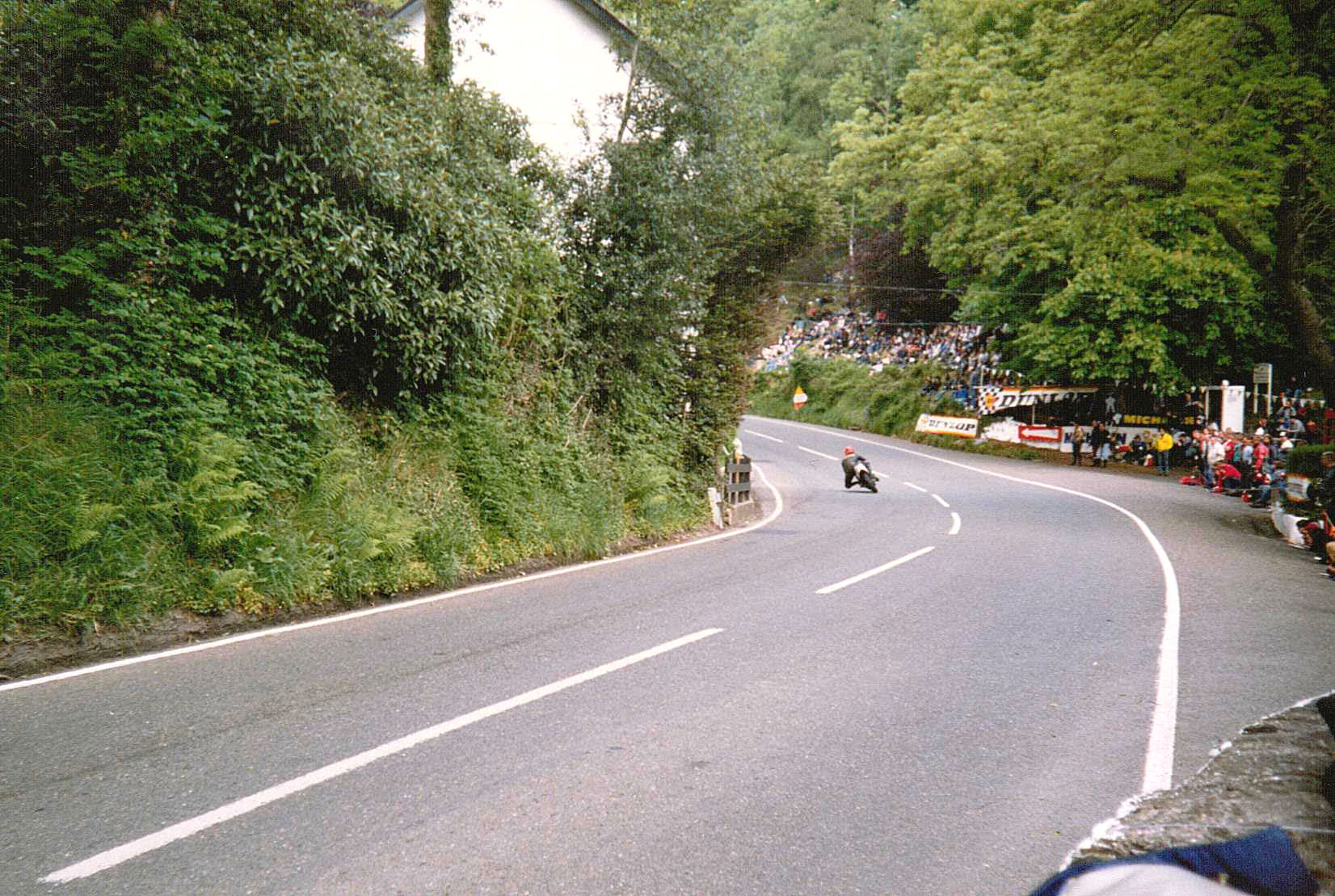
Racing motorcycle negotiating the entrance to Glen Helen turn, exiting uphill, set deep in the countryside with the entrance to the actual Glen and car park (shared with the closed restaurant) to the right, with many spectators around the outside of the bend

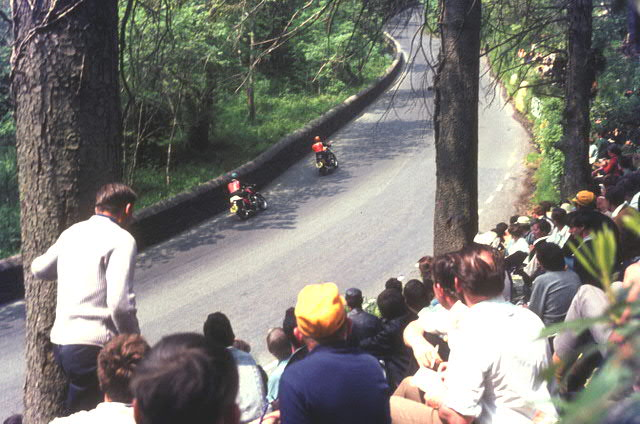
TT race spectators at the exit to Glen Helen in 1969 with two travelling marshals passing by towards Creg Willey's Hill
