= Ballacraine =

- Location within Isle of Man
- 54°12′9.8″N 4°37′44.7″W

Ballacraine (Manx: [baləˈkʰɾɛːn], "McCrayne" or "Craine's farm"; archaic Ballagarraghan Beg) is a site on the Isle of Man TT course, located between the 7th and 8th milestones of the track. It is at the junction of the A1 Douglas to Peel and A3 Castletown to Ramsey primary roads in the parish of German. It is now at the east end of the ribbon development of St. John's village. At the junction is the former public house, the Ballacraine Inn, now a private residence.

== Motor sport heritage ==
Ballacraine was part of the 37.50 Mile Four Inch Course for the RAC Tourist Trophy automobile races held in the Isle of Man between 1908 and 1922.

A section of the A3 Castletown to Peel road to Ballacraine and the Douglas to Peel road from Ballacraine to Quarterbridge, Douglas was used for the 1905 International Motor-Cycle Cup Races.

The Ballacraine sections of the A1 and A3 roads were part of the St. Johns Short Course used for the Isle of Man TT races between 1907 and 1910.

In 1911, the Four Inch Course for automobiles was first used by the Auto-Cycling Union for the Isle of Man TT motorcycle races. This included the Ballacraine section, and the course later became known as the 37.73 mile (60.70 km) Isle of Man TT Mountain Course; this has been used since 1911 for the Isle of Man TT Races and from 1923 for the Manx Grand Prix races.

== Gallery ==
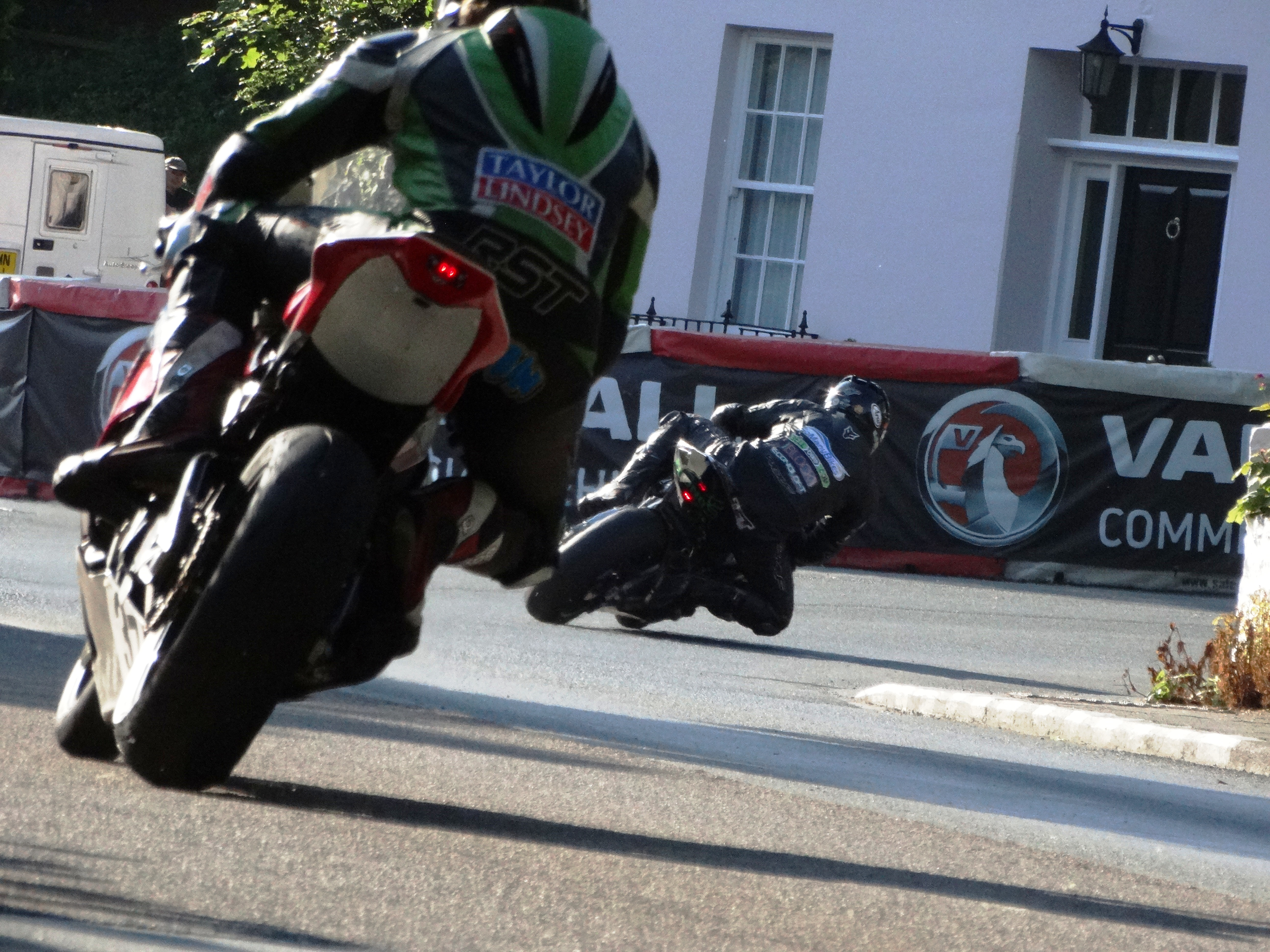
Racing motorcyclists cornering at the site of a former pub.

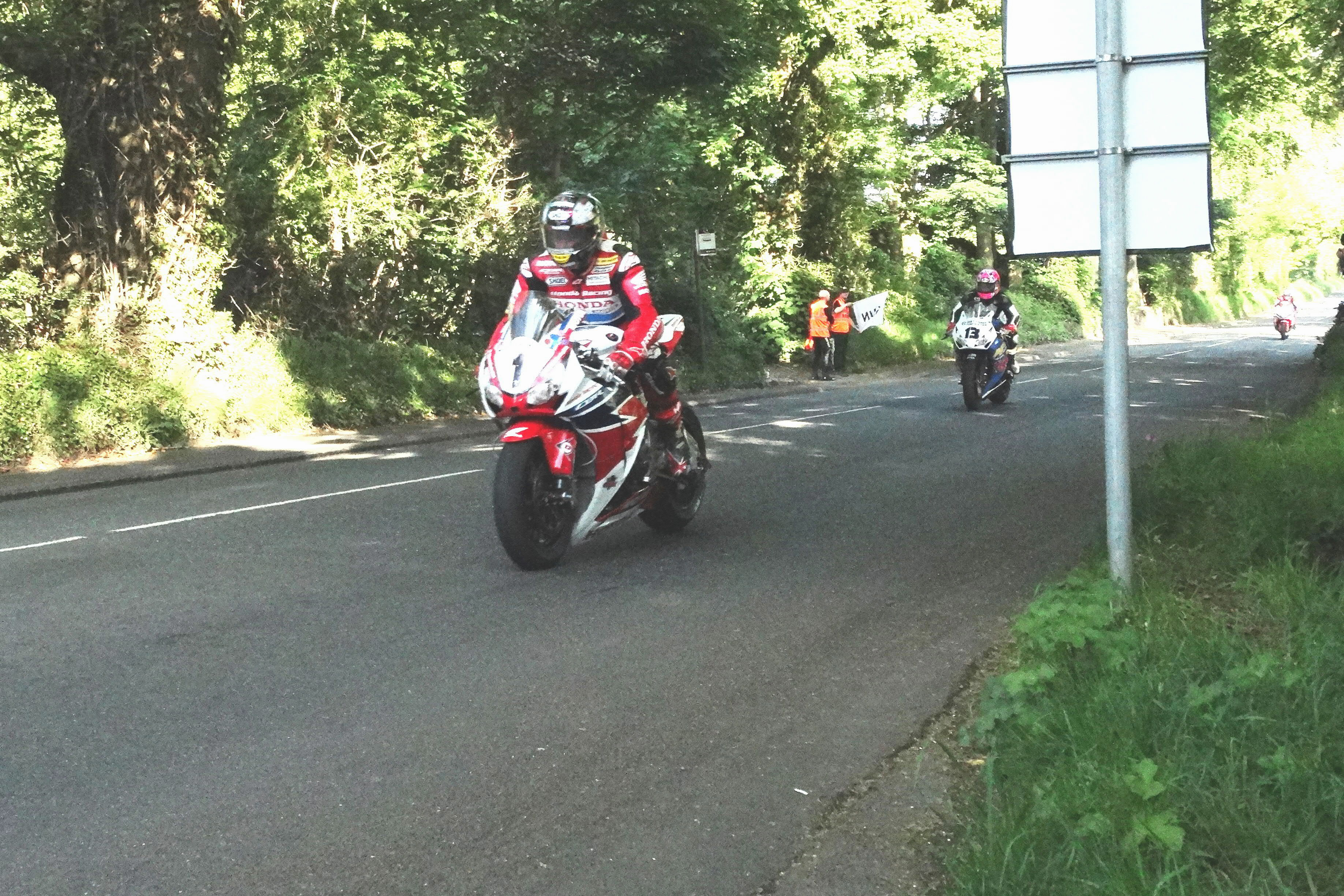
Racing motorcyclists approaching Ballacraine.
