= Michael (parish) =

Coordinates: 54.274722°N 4.550278°W

Michael: Manx: Maayl
- Parish of Michael, Isle of Man
- Population: 1,522
- OS grid reference: SC3396689582
- Sheading: Michael
- Crown dependency: Isle of Man
- Post town: ISLE OF MAN
- Postcode district: IM6
- House of Keys: Ayre & Michael

Michael (Manx: Maayl) is one of the seventeen historic parishes of the Isle of Man.

It is located in the northwest of the island (part of the traditional North Side division) in the sheading of the same name.

The village of Kirk Michael is the principal settlement in the parish. Smaller hamlets include Barregarrow.

== Local government ==
For the purposes of local government, the whole of the historic parish forms a single district with Commissioners.

The district of Michael was formed in 1989 by the re-amalgamation of two local authority areas, Kirk Michael village and the larger rural area of Michael parish. These two local authority areas had been separated from one another in 1905.

The Captain of the Parish (since 1970) is John James Martin Cannell.

== Politics ==
Michael parish is part of the Ayre & Michael constituency, which elects two Members to the House of Keys. Before 2016 it was in the Michael constituency.

== Geography ==
Michael parish is bounded by the parishes of Ballaugh to the north, German to the southwest, Braddan to the southeast, and Lezayre to the east. The parish/district stretches from the Irish Sea in the west, inland to Druidale in the east and from Orrisdale in the north to Glen Cam in the south.

The principal settlement in Michael parish is the inland village of Kirk Michael. It also encompasses the hamlet of Barregarrow. There is also Orrisdale (also known as Four Towns), Glen Wyllin and Ballacarnane Beg.

Michael consists of an agricultural area, with a roughly 3 km wide coastal strip of agricultural land, and the rest hilly moorland. The south of the hills are sparsely populated, which has been attributed to the misty atmosphere and poorer soil quality compared to the north. The highest points are Slieau Freoaghane (488 metres (1,601 ft)), Sartfell (454 metres (1,490 ft)), Slieau Curn (351 metres (1,152 ft)) and Slieau Dhoo (432 metres (1,417 ft)) (together known as the Michael Hills). Michael's glens are Glen Wyllin, Glen Mooar and Glen Trunk.

The coast of Michael has faced coastal erosion, with Rev John Crellin in 1774 describing how the coast "often falls down… washed away". Keeill Pharlane and its cemetery were lost to erosion. This erosion has "accelerated" over the years. Kirk Michael village is located inland, but is gradually moving closer to the sea.

== Landmarks ==
- Bishopscourt, the former official residence of the Bishop, is located just north of Kirk Michael village. Though a private residence, it is occasionally open to the public.
  - Bishopscourt Glen, shared with Ballaugh and formerly the personal garden of Bishopscourt. The glen includes an artificial mound called Mount Aeolus and The Cave of the Winds. Until 1987 the mound had two cannon on top. The mound was built under Bishop Mark Hildesley to commemorate the victory of Captain Elliot over the French privateer François Thurot off the coast near Ramsey in 1760.
- Cronk Urleigh or Reneurling, a hillock reported to be the site of the original Tynwald courts
- Glen Mooar
  - Cabbal Pherick, a ruined keeill just by Spooyt Vane, a waterfall
- Glen Wyllin, which contains Cooildarry Nature Reserve and a seasonal campsite.
- Montpelier, house and woodland east of the Michael hills

== Demographics ==
According to Rev John Crellin, Michael parish had a population of 870 in 1774 when he was writing. The parish figure was 749 by 1927, according to John R. Quayle. In the 2016 census, Michael parish had 1,591 residents, down from 1,729 in 2011.

Michael parish (census)
Year	1981	1986	1996	2001	2006	2011	2016	2021
Pop.	977	1,044	1,261	1,431	1,640	1,729	1,591	1,522
±%	—	+6.9%	+20.8%	+13.5%	+14.6%	+5.4%	−8.0%	−4.3%
