= Signpost Corner, Isle of Man =

Point on TT motorcycle race course

Signpost Corner
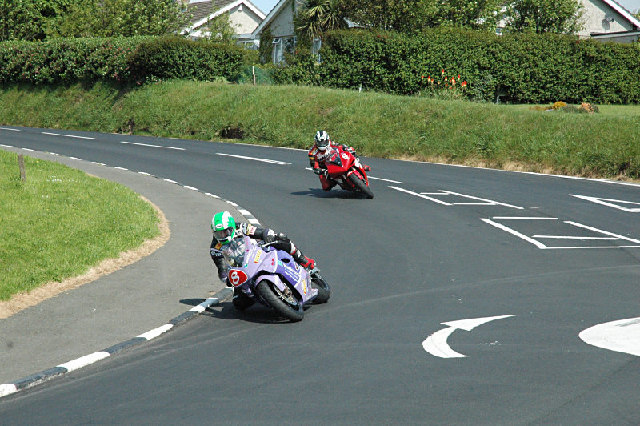

Location
- Coordinates: 54°10′47″N 4°28′13″W; SC388788
- Roads at junction: A18 (Snaefell Mountain Road); A39 (Hillberry Road)/B11 (Avondale Road); ‘Old Road’/(A18) Bemahague Road

Construction

Signpost Corner, Isle of Man is a former temporary motor-cycle race signal station, located on the A18 Snaefell Mountain Road at the road junction with the A39 Hillberry Road / B11 Avondale Road in the parish of Onchan in the Isle of Man.

== Origin of name ==
The name derives from a signal station for the Isle of Man TT races and Manx Grand Prix. The signal station at Signpost Corner was connected to the race scoreboards located in Glencrutchery Road in Douglas by a telephone land-line. Race officials would instruct local Scouts on the scoreboards to switch a light on above an individual competitor's scoreboard which would indicate to the pit crew and race officials that a particular rider had passed through Signpost Corner and might shortly be pulling into the race-pits located at the Grandstand on Glencrutchery Road to refuel.

== Bedstead Corner ==
Located near the former signal station at the Signpost road junction is Bedstead Corner on the (A18) Bemahague Road section of the Isle of Man TT Mountain Course. The name is said to have come from a section of farm walling which had fallen into disrepair. The landowner was said to have made 'temporary' repairs with old bedsteads in order to make the field stockproof. The 'temporary' repairs remained in place long enough for the name to become established and stick until the present day.

== Popular culture ==
George MacDonald Fraser, author of the Flashman series of books, lived on the Isle of Man and titled his 2002 autobiographical memoir of his experiences as a Hollywood scriptwriter as "The Light's On at Signpost".

== Motor sport heritage ==
In 1911 the Four Inch Course for automobiles was first used by the Auto-Cycling Union for the Isle of Man TT motorcycle races.

The section of the Mountain Course from the Cronk-ny-Mona road junction to Governor's Bridge was first adopted for the 1920 Isle of Man TT motor-cycle races and the Manx Grand Prix in 1923. This included the Signpost Corner road junction, ‘Bedstead Corner’ and the section known as the "old road" of the TT Course from the Nook to Governor's Bridge.

The Signpost Corner section of the TT Course is used as part of timed special stages for the former Manx International Rally and Rally Isle of Man.

In recent years the race signal station has been moved to a preceding position on the Mountain Course at Cronk-ny-Mona as average race speeds have increased.

== Road improvements ==
The section of the TT Course between Signpost Corner and Bedstead Corner was widened during the winter of 1953/54 and the road re-profiled.
