= Archie Birkin =

British motorcycle racer (1905–1927)

- Nationality: English
- Born: 30 March 1905; Nottingham, England
- Died: 7 June 1927 (aged 22); Kirk Michael, Isle of Man

Charles Archibald Cecil Birkin (30 March 1905 – 7 June 1927) was an English motorcycle racer, brother of Tim Birkin, one of the "Bentley Boys" of the 1920s.

== Background and family ==
Birkin was born into a wealthy Nottingham family in 1905. He was the son of Sir Thomas Stanley Birkin, 2nd Bt. and Hon. Margaret Diana Hopetoun Chetwynd.

== Motorcycle racing ==
During an early morning practice session for the 1927 Isle of Man TT races, Birkin, riding a 500c McEvoy motor-cycle, crashed fatally at Rhencullen after swerving to avoid a collision with a Fish Van being driven on open roads. From 1928 onwards, practice sessions for the Isle of Man TT Races and Manx Grand Prix were held on closed public roads.
