= Four Inch Course =

Isle of Man road-racing circuit

Coordinates: 54°10′18″N 4°29′31″W

Four-Inch Course
- Location: Douglas, Isle of Man
- Major events: RAC Tourist Trophy
- Length: 37.52 mi (60.39 km)
- Turns: 219
- Race lap record: 1 hour 32 mins, 32.2 sec (57.70 mph) (Major Henry Segrave, Sunbeam, 1922)

The Four Inch Course was a road-racing circuit first used for the 1908 Tourist Trophy Race for cars, held on public roads closed for racing by an Act of Tynwald (the parliament of the Isle of Man). The name of the course derives from the regulations for the 1908 Tourist Trophy adopted by the Royal Automobile Club, which limited the competitors' engines to a cylinder-diameter of four inches. The Four-Inch Course was adopted by the Auto-Cycle Club for the 1911 Isle of Man TT Races. The Four-Inch Course was subsequently known as the Snaefell Mountain Course or Mountain Course when used for motor-cycle racing.

== Four Inch Course ==
The new course length was 37.5 miles (60.4 km), based on the 'Short' Highroads Course with the omission of the Sandygate Loop and the Peel Loop. The start-line was moved from the road junction of the A2 Quarterbridge Road/Alexander Drive to Hillberry Corner on the A18 Mountain Road.

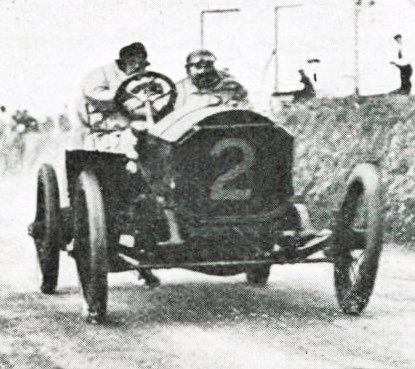
William Watson, winner of the 1908 Tourist Trophy at the Four Inch Course

The Four Inch Course was based on a number of public roads closed for the duration of racing, including:

- The primary A18 Snaefell Mountain Road from the start-line at Hillberry Corner to the junction with the primary A21 Johnny Watterson's Lane and the tertiary C10 Scholag Road at Cronk-ny-Mona in the town of Douglas.
- The primary A21 Johnny Watterson's Lane from Cronk-ny-Mona to the junction with the A22 Ballanard Road.
- The A22 Ballanard Road in an easterly direction to the road junction at St Ninian's Crossroads, the A2 Bray Hill and the A2 Quarterbridge Road in Douglas to Quarter Bridge.
- The A1 Douglas to Peel road from Quarter Bridge to Ballacraine at the junction with the A3 Castletown to Ramsey road.
- The A3 Castletown to Ramsey road from Ballacraine to Parliament Square, Ramsey.
- The A9 Albert Road in Ramsey, including two small sections of private road with the northerly junction of the primary A18 Snaefell Mountain Road.
- The A18 Mountain Road to the finish-line at Hillberry Corner.

The Four Inch Course was adopted by the Auto-Cycle Club for the 1911 Isle of Man TT Races and the start-line was moved to a level section of the Quarterbridge Road between Selborne Drive and the 1st Milestone/Alexander Drive, becoming known as the Snaefell Mountain Course when used for motorcycle racing.

From the 1920 Isle of Man TT races, changes were made to the Snaefell Mountain Course and competitors turned left at Cronk-ny-Mona following the primary A18 Bemahague Road to Governor's Bridge, then to a new start/finish line on Glencrutchery Road which lengthened the course from the pre-World War I length of 37.50 miles (60.35 km) to 37.75 miles (60.75 km).

More changes to the course followed for the 1923 Isle of Man TT races with the adoption of two small sections of private road between Parliament Square and May Hill in Ramsey. The Snaefell Mountain Course had previously negotiated the A2 Albert Road and Tower Road in Ramsey which differed from the original Four-Inch circuit which had incorporated these sections of private road and the new Mountain Course length increased to 37.739 miles (60.74 km). The official course distance for the Snaefell Mountain Course was amended for the 1938 Isle of Man TTraces to 37.73 miles (60.72 km) which is the current Snaefell Mountain Course length.

== See also ==
- Snaefell Mountain Course
- Clypse Course
- Billown Circuit
- RAC Tourist Trophy
- Isle of Man TT
- Manx Grand Prix
