= List of named corners of the Snaefell Mountain Course =

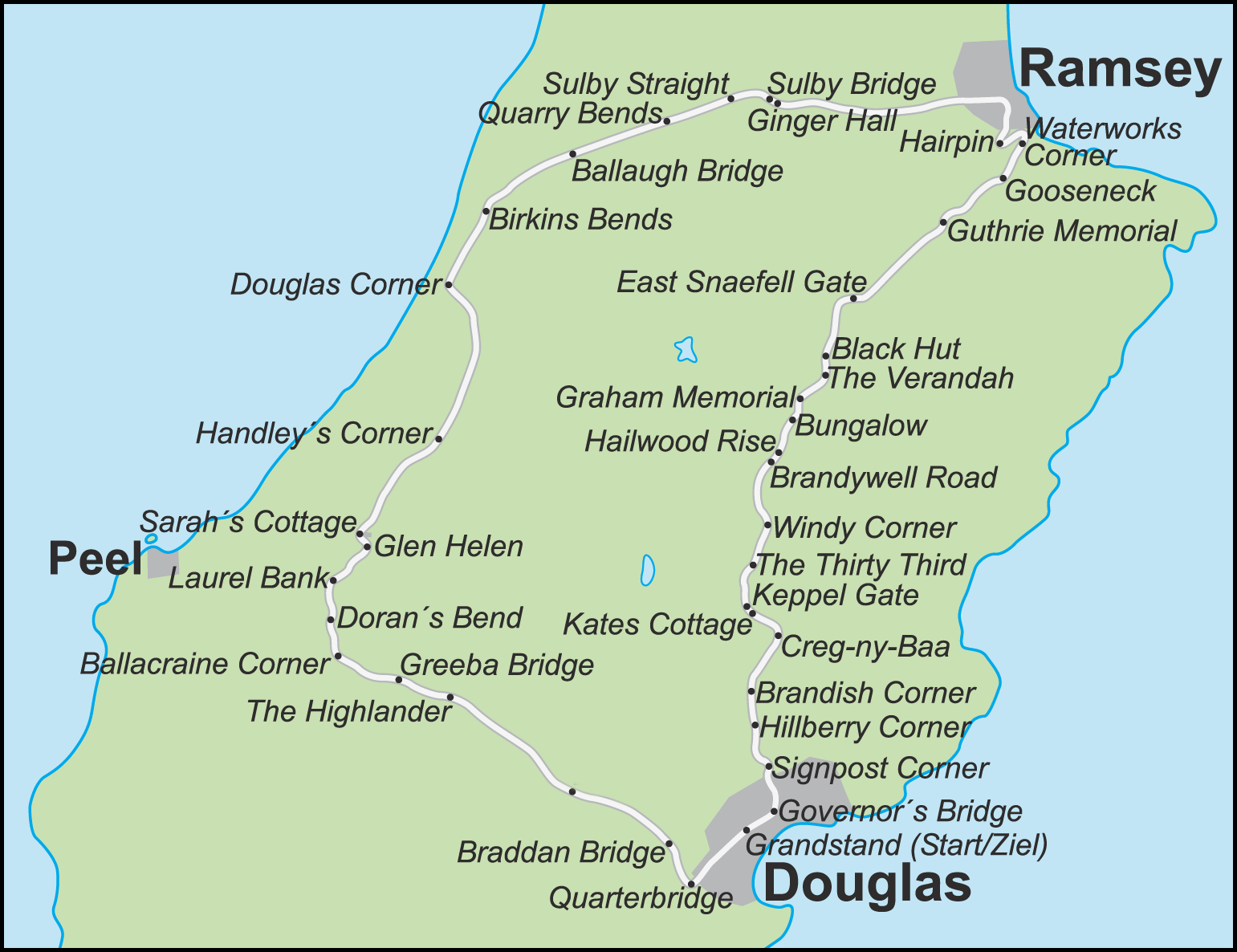
Course with selected corners marked

The Snaefell Mountain Course, a motorsport racing circuit that was once part of Grand Prix motorcycle racing, has more than 60 named corners, bends, straightaways, and other features. Unlike the closed-circuit race tracks now used in all Grand Prix championship races, (Note: See Grand Prix motorcycle racing#Circuits. All 18 circuits in MotoGP 2016 are race tracks.) the course runs 37.73 miles (60.72 km) almost entirely along public roads of the Isle of Man. (Note: Following road improvements, The Nook and Governor's Bridge Dip near the end of a lap are race-only, otherwise closed to normal traffic by barriers.)

This list includes prominent corners and other landmarks along the course, with names that are used in media coverage and by racers, spectators, and administrators.

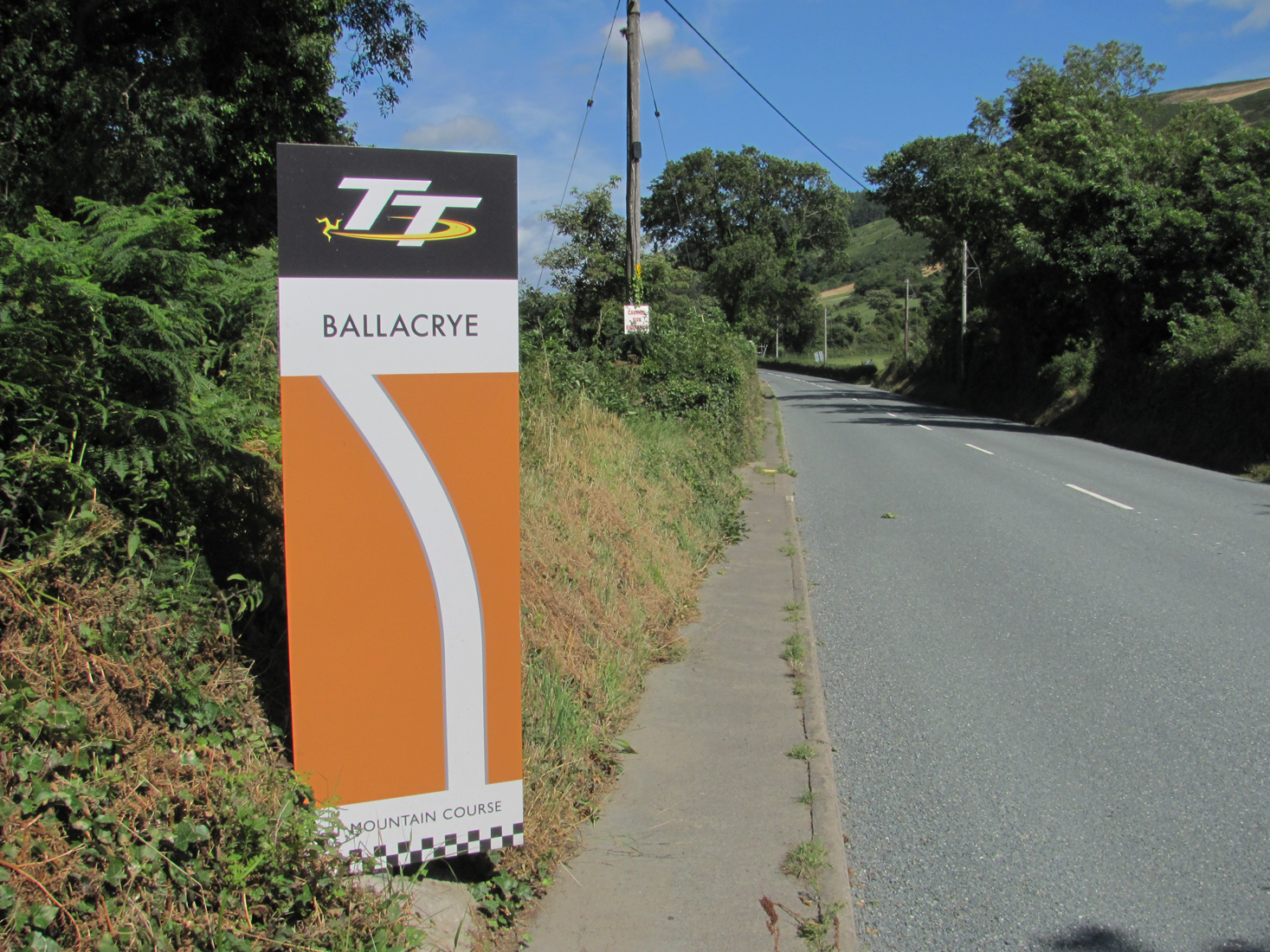
Marker flag for a left turn

The number of turns in the course is debatable – writing in his 1974 book, TT racer and motorcycle journalist Ray Knight mentioned that the Guinness Book of Records quoted 264, echoed by a 2011 report. Some of the curves, S-bends, turns at crossroads, and other features in the course would not seem significant to car drivers in public traffic, but they are very significant for high-speed racers. 136.358 mph (219.447 km/h) is the highest average speed that has been attained over one lap of the course, by Peter Hickman on 9 June 2023 when he won the second Superstock race. At jumps where most race machines rise clear off the ground, drivers of cars at slow speeds might not even notice a bump. At each corner, racers must consider adjusting their entry speed, focus on their pre-planned line, lean according to the nature of the turn, and anticipate accelerating, decelerating, turning again, or otherwise handling their machines as needed while exiting the turn.

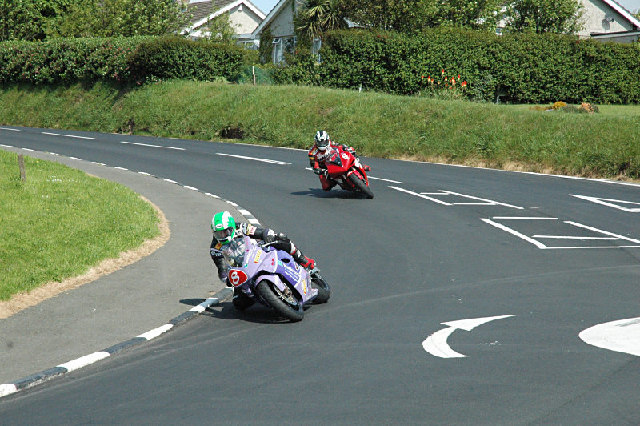
Racers rounding Signpost Corner near end of a lap, 6 June 2005

There are road-side marker boards, posted in advance of the major features, bearing these names to inform practice racers, and during races they may remind racers what is coming. The turns generally aren't labelled by numbers as on short racing circuits.

Spectators also focus on named corners and other landmarks beside the course; many of the best vantage points are at turns where racers can be better seen as they slow down. As a guidebook for visitors to the Isle of Man describes:

Spectators gather all around the course at locations which have become part of road-racing history: Bray Hill, Quarterbridge, Ballacraine, Laurel Bank, Baaregarrow, Ballaugh Bridge, Quarry Bends, Sulby Straight, Ramsey Hairpin, Gooseneck, Verandah, 32nd Milestone, Windy Corner, Sarah's Cottage, Creg-ny-Baa, Hillberry Corner, Signpost, Governor's Bridge.

== Naming practices ==
While there are named turns in other racing circuits, naming of corners and other turns elsewhere is usually less salient. For example, there is the notable "Dunlop Curve" of the 24 Hours of Le Mans' automobile race circuit and motorcycle race circuit. But the turns in many courses are primarily referred to by numbers, e.g. turns of the 1909-built Indianapolis Motor Speedway in the U.S. are referred to as Turn 1 through Turn 13. The Snaefell Mountain Course is one of the longer racing circuits and has more turns.

Like named corners on other circuits, many are named after champion racers, such as Joey's Corner at the 26th Milestone, posthumously named to commemorate the 26 racing victories of racer Joey Dunlop on this course prior to his death racing in Estonia, and Hailwood's Rise/Hailwood's Height, named after famous rider Mike Hailwood, killed in a road traffic accident in central England. However, in 2013 McGuinness's and Molyneux's were named in honour of living rider John McGuinness and sidecar driver Dave Molyneux, ranking second and third in the tally of TT race wins.

In 2017, a bend was named after a non-competitor for the first time; Raymond Caley was a long-time shopkeeper with premises on the course at Sulby. In 2025, MD's was named on a left-bend at the 27th mile from startline, to acknowledge when the multiple (29-time) race winner Michael Dunlop had surpassed his uncle Joey's 26 wins with his 27th win in 2024.

Some corners on the Mountain course are named for riders who suffered accidents at the corner or nearby: Doran's Bend after Bill Doran and Brandish Corner, after Walter Brandish. Others refer to the corner's physical shape: Verandah, The Nook. More take names of nearby artificial or natural landmarks: Creg-ny-Baa (a pub), Tower Bends, Bray Hill. Landmark-based names may continue to be used long after their namesake is gone: Keppel Gate, Signpost Corner.

Course marked in red

The roads are open to two-way public traffic for most of the year, but are closed during practice times and races. The Sunday of main race week is traditionally known as "Mad Sunday". Due to road traffic accidents, a newly formed road-safety committee in 1964 proposed that the Snaefell mountain road should be one-way traffic in the race direction for part of Sunday. Nowadays, for the entire racing season of several weeks in May/June and August/September, the mountain portion of the course (from Ramsey to Douglas) is restricted to one-way in the race direction, and parking is prohibited in various areas.

These and other provisions allow inexperienced racers and visiting motorcyclists to learn the corners and informally practice on the course.

The following is a partial list of named corners and other landmarks along the course. Turns described as left- or right-handers assume that travel is in the race direction, which is clockwise around the circuit.

== Named corners ==
Corner mileage	Photo	Location	Notes
Startline 0.00	alt=TT Grandstand area with scoreboard to extreme left, course start/finish to left (in distance), pit lane with re-fuelling equipment and acceleration lane to centre	On A2 Glencrutchery Road, above Douglas Bay at a height of 280 ft (85 m) above sea level, 54°10′4″N 4°28′41″W	Grandstand complex developed in 1985/1986, replacing the earlier 1926 version. Concourse with pre-race assembly area/Parc Ferme, start/finishline, spectator seating, scoreboard, race control, pit lane with re-fuelling, exit with acceleration lane, scrutineering, post race podiums, retailing, hospitality, exhibitions.
St Ninian's Crossroads 0.29		On A2 (Ramsey to Douglas road) multi-junction, location of first permanent traffic signals in Isle of Man. 54°09′54″N 4°29′01″W	At St. Ninian's Church (dedicated to Ninian of Whithorn). Close to the startline, a left-jink needing careful machine placement for the racing line into the Bray Hill descent. Taken very fast on a flying lap (i.e. without stopping at the pits for running repairs, refuelling and/or tyre(s)).
Bray Hill 0.64		On A2 (Ramsey to Douglas road); 54°09′42″N 4°29′23″W	Very steep descent soon after the start line, with a slight curve, a sudden bottoming-out and a subsequent steep rise up another slightly curving hill. The physics of it causes bikes to unload suspension after the base compression at 160 mph.
Quarterbridge Road 0.79		On A2 (Ramsey to Douglas road), after multi side-road junction, Bray Hill becomes Quarterbridge Road; 54°09′39″N 4°29′30″W	After the bottom of Bray Hill, a subsequent steep rise (previously known as Brown's Hill) causes modern race machines to wheelie up a stretch now famously known as "Ago's leap" (after 1960s-70s Italian race-ace Giacomo Agostini) and then crowning-out to a flat area, historically one of several startlines for early racing, with machines assembled in Selborne Drive side-turning. Road surface was altered after Ago's departure (early 1970s) but machines are now twice as powerful (100 bhp/200 bhp) with larger engines than were allowed in World Championship racing. Followed by a steep descent and the first heavy-braking area of the lap at Quarter Bridge
Quarterbridge 1.26		Road junction of A2 Quarterbridge Road and A1 Peel Road; 54°09′21″N 4°30′06″W	Also known as Quarter Bridge, a tight right turn on the course at a major junction with a traffic roundabout. At the bridge spanning the River Glass, at boundary of the historic "quarterlands" of Ballabrooie and Ballaquayle. Historically one of several startlines of early car racing.
Braddan Bridge 1.70		'S' bend and junction with two staggered side-roads on A1 Peel Road; 54°09′41″N 4°30′20″W	Second heavy-braking point on the lap, 'S' bend to left then right, at a bridge spanning the River Dhoo and former railway line, which has been converted to provide access under course during race closures. Seated viewing in church land. Historically one of several viewing areas within walking distance of visitors passing through Douglas town centre ferry terminal.
Snugborough 2.4		On A1 Peel Road with side-turn junction leading to industrial estate 54°10′01″N 4°30′59″W	Dip in road on approach to Union Mills. "Before you get to Union Mills there used to be a tricky fast right hander called Snugborough. The complete easing of that gives a full-bore run into Union Mills,..."
Union Mills 2.7		On A1 Peel Road with staggered side-turn junctions Cronk Road and A22 Strang Road; 54°10′07″N 4°31′20″W	Several curves passing through a residential village
Ballahutchin Hill 3.2		On A1 leaving Union Mills residential outskirts into countryside 54°10′15″N 4°31′44″W	Long climbing straight passing Glenlough farm and campsite at crest
Ballagarey Corner 3.75		On A1 (Douglas to Peel Road); 54°10′26″N 4°32′58″W	Very fast right-curve, slang-term Ballascarey. Scene of two crashes in 2010, Guy Martin and New Zealander Paul Dobbs (who died). Named after Manx: Bailey ny liargee - farm of the slope
Glen Vine 3.9		On A1 Peel Road with side-turn junction A26; 54°10′40″N 4°33′20″W	Passing through a small residential village before Crosby
Crosby Crossroads 4.81		On A1 Douglas to Peel road, with side-junctions A23 and B35. 54°11′01″N 4°33′55″W	In the village of Crosby, population about 900.
Crosby Jump 5.00		On A1 Douglas to Peel road. 54°11′14″N 4°34′26″W	Crosby Jump (also known as Crosby Leap or Crosby Hill) at the 5-mile marker from TT Grandstand start, a Fanzone in 2012. Leaving the village of Crosby at one of the highest points of the course in the westerly-direction, dropping gently past Halfway House, a former hotel roughly equi-distant (5 mile) from the towns of Douglas and Peel, towards one of the fastest points on the course at The Highlander. On A1 road, the course at Halfway House was straightened in 1962 by the removal of two bankings seemingly in pursuit of higher race speeds.
The Highlander 5.1		On A1 Peel Road; 54°11′25″N 4°34′53″W	Long straight, passing by former coaching house and pub (closed), through one of the fastest parts of the course, previously a speed-trap location.
Greeba Castle and Greeba Bridge 5.8 and 6.3		On A1 (Douglas to Peel road); 54°11′35″N 4°35′20″W; 54°11′48″N 4°36′19″W	Greeba Castle, a large Gothic-style residence dating from the Victorian-period, closely followed by Greeba Bridge; name is derived from Scandinavian: Gnipa, a peak. Previously known as Cronk Dhoo. In an area of farmland. Nearby summits include Beary Mountain (311 m), Greeba Mountain (422 m), Slieau Ruy (479 m) and Slieau Whallian (333 m).
Ballacraine 7.65		Junction of A1 and A3 (Castletown to Ramsey road); 54°12′10″N 4°37′34″W	Right-hand turn onto the A3 at a crossroads. At east end of St. Johns village, with Ballacraine Farm on the inside of the turn and the former Ballacraine Arms (Hotel), a former public house, across the corner.
Doran's Bend 8.44		On A3 (Castletown to Ramsey) road 54°12′43″N 4°37′52″W	Named after Bill Doran, who crashed and broke a leg here during practice for the 1950 Isle of Man TT races, and who again crashed near here two years later, in practice for the 1952 Isle of Man TT, again putting him out of that set of races.
Laurel Bank 8.75		On A3 Castletown to Ramsey Road; 54°13′3″N 4°37′57″W	Fast right-hand turn (Manx: Cronk-y-Killey)
Black Dub 8.800 to 9.30		On A3 Castletown to Ramsey road 54°13′16″N 4°37′32″W	Leading on from Laurel Bank, a left then right followed by another long sweeping left-hander into Glen Helen. Now a restricted (non-viewing) area. Named after the dark, boggy area close by the adjacent river valley.
Glen Helen 9.60 to 9.90		On A3 Castletown to Ramsey road 54°13′33″N 4°37′02″W	Leading on from Black Dub, through the sweeping left-hander at Glen Helen and uphill towards Sarah's and Creg Willey's
Sarah's Cottage 9.93		on A3 Castletown to Ramsey road 54°13′40″N 4°37′12″W	After Glen Helen, Sarah's is a right-turning bend at a small stone cottage on the outside of the bend, halfway up Creg Willey's Hill leading to Lambfell. Named after the "Sarah" who lived there around 1900 and served refreshments for travellers.
Creg Willey's 10.00		on A3 Castletown to Ramsey road 54°13′47″N 4°37′08″W	Although the hill starts at Glen Helen, Creg Willey's is the name given to a steep climb after the right-turn at Sarah's, leading to Lambfell. Some confusion about the etymology which could be a corruption of Creg Willy Syl. Also quoted as "Creg Willies Hill". Creg Willy's Hillclimb event starts just before Glen Helen and ends after the hill tops-out on the straight.
Lambfell 10.23		on A3 Castletown to Ramsey road 54°13′49″N 4°37′07″W	Right/left curve after Creg Willey's before the Cronk-y-Voddy Straight. AKA Lambfell Cottage and (the area) Lambfell Moar
Cronk-y-Voddy Straight 10.75		on A3 Castletown to Ramsey road 54°14′17″N 4°36′37″W	Cronk-y-Voddy Straight – very fast but bumpy and undulating
Molyneux's 11.03		on A3 Castletown to Ramsey road 54°14′29″N 4°36′23″W	Right-hander at the end of Cronk-y-Voddy straight, with nearby road sign indicating the preceding small cross-road side junctions, Little London Road and Ballabrooie Road, providing spectator parking. Named in 2013 after multi-TT winning sidecar racer Dave Molyneux
11th Milestone 11.49		On A3 (Castletown to Ramsey) road 54°14′43″N 4°35′48″W	A distinctive S-bend, also known as "Drinkwater's Bend", named after Ben Drinkwater who crashed fatally at this point during the 1949 350 cc Junior TT Race.
McGuinness's 12.45		Left hander before the top of Barregarrow on the A3 54°15′15″N 4°35′06″W	Named in 2013 after multi-TT winning rider John McGuinness
Barregarrow 12.75		From top of "Barregarroo hill" on the A3 Douglas road; crossing C4 (Ballaleigh Road).	Crossroads before chapel and steep hill. Also spelt Barregarroo and otherwise, after Manx name Bayr Garroo meaning "rough road", commonly pronounced "B'Garrow". A popular vantage point with limited viewing.
Rhencullen 14.90		On A3 (Castletown to Ramsey) road 54°17′31″N 4°34′36″W	A series of four curves, name equates to Holly Ridge.
Birkin's Bend 15.26		On A3 (Castletown to Ramsey) road 54°17′34″N 4°34′41″W	Named after racer Archie Birkin who was killed by a crash here, when avoiding a fish van, during practice for the 1927 Isle of Man TT. From 1928 on, public roads were closed for practice runs. No longer a clear turn due to roadway changes; part of the Rhencullen series of four bends.
Dub Cottage 16.21		On A3 (Castletown to Ramsey) road 54°18′14″N 4°33′48″W	
Ballaugh Bridge 17.20		Bridge at junction of C37 Ballaugh Glen Road and A10 (Ballaugh Station Road); 54°18′34″N 4°32′28″W	Only remaining hump-backed bridge on the course, since removal of Ballig Bridge in 1935.
Ballacrye Corner 17.84		A3 (Castleton to Ramsey road); 54°18′40″N 4°31′36″W	"Ballacrye" derives from Manx: McCray or Cry's farm. There is a drop in the road here that makes a jump—many racing motor-cycles lift off into the air—said to be the fastest and most dangerous jump on the course. Spectating is prohibited after the jump but is allowed before it with excellent views.
Quarry Bends 18.46		On A3; 54°18′56″N 4°30′48″W	A complex of bends. A small railway siding off the Manx Northern Railway built in 1879 to serve Clarke's stone quarry at Ballavolley crossed the road here at Close e Volley, later renamed Quarry Bends.
Caley's 19.00		On A3; 54°19′06″N 4°29′48″W	Left kink before the straight leading to Sulby village, named to honour local shopkeeper Raymond Caley who died in 2017 and operated the local post office and small general store on the crossroads for many years.
Sulby Straight 19.16		On A3; 54.319°N 4.490°W	1.5-mile (2.4 km) straight through Sulby village. Racer Bruce Anstey reached 206 mph (331.51 km/h) here during practice for the 2006 TT, which in 2015 remains the unofficial speed record on the racecourse and for the Isle of Man. He won the Superstock TT that year, and held the course lap record during 2014–2015.
Sulby Bridge 20.13		On A3; 54°N 4°W	A wide 90-degree right turn at the end of Sulby Straight where the Sulby River passes under a road bridge, exiting flat then with a slight rise climbing towards Ginger Hall
Ginger Hall 20.30		On A3 (Lezayre Road); 54.321°N 4.471°W	Climbing left-hander at the Ginger Hall Hotel, named after the ginger beer once brewed and served there. A popular vantage point with parking and refreshments leading to Kerrowmoar.
Kerrowmoar 20.62		On A3 (Lezayre Road); 54°19′15″N 4°27′45″W	Complex of bends through countryside. "Kerrowmoar" derives from Manx: The Great Quarterland.
Glentramman		On A3 (Lezayre Road); 54°19′05.1″N 4°25′57.8″W	Medium-speed left-hand bend between Glen Duff and Churchtown, scene of a number of racing incidents.
Lezayre (Churchtown) 22.70		On A3 (Lezayre Road); 54°19′08″N 4°25′25″W	Complex of curves leading towards Ramsey outskirts, adjacent to small side-road junctions and Churchtown War Memorial for locals fallen in the First and Second World Wars. Popular spectator vantage point.
School House Corner 23.50		on A3 (Lezayre Road), a left curve beyond a straight adjacent to the school premises with pedestrian overbridge 54°19′14″N 4°23′37″W	Name derives from the nearby Ramsey Grammar School and was formerly known as Russell's Corner after Benjy Russell who crashed fatally during the Lightweight Race for the 1949 Manx Grand Prix.
Parliament Square		A3 (Lezayre Road); 54°19′20″N 4°23′12″W	A hard right-hander after fierce braking into the central square and multi-road junction in the town of Ramsey, closely followed by a medium left-hander heading out of the square along Queen's Pier Road
Queen's Pier Road and May Hill		A18 Queen's Pier Road/May Hill	Queen's Pier Road at slightly above sea level 24 ft (7.3 m), joining with May Hill starting to climb, heading out of the town of Ramsey towards Cruickshank's Corner
Cruickshank's Corner		A18 Queen's Pier Road/May Hill	Right curve on A18 Queen's Pier Road at multi-junction where A18 becomes May Hill, slightly uphill leading out of the residential area on the outskirts of Ramsey
Whitegates		A18 May Hill/Hughenden Terrace; 54°19′01″N 4°23′01″W	Whitegates, a left-hander heading out of the town of Ramsey towards Stella Maris
Stella Maris 24.00		A18 Mountain Road; 54°18′53″N 4°23′00″W	Sweeping right-curve, climbing to the very outskirts of the Ramsey settlement, closely preceding the Hairpin
Ramsey Hairpin 24.54		A18 Mountain Road; 54°18′49″N 4°23′01″W	Hairpin curve at Ballacowle Glen in the outskirts of the town of Ramsey
Waterworks 25.94		On A18 Mountain Road; 54°18′47″N 4°22′35″W	Two sharp right-handers after Ramsey Hairpin whose name derives from the nearby Ballure Reservoir that was built in 1859 and extended in 1884.
Tower Bends 25.10		On A18 Mountain Road54°18′29″N 4°22′52″W	S-bend corner. Named after 45-foot granite and slate tower on Albert's Mount up to the east, at location where, in 1847, Albert, Prince Consort climbed up to see the view, on excursion from the Royal Yacht HMY Victoria and Albert (1843). Queen Victoria remained on board.
Gooseneck 25.96		A18 Mountain Road; 54°18′17″N 4°22′51″W	Right-turn, climbing corner that is a popular vantage point, as spectators can be very close to the riders. Fatal accidents in 1955 and 1994. occurred coming into and out of this corner.
26th Milestone 26.15		A18 Mountain Road; 54°18′04″N 04°23′37″W	Also known as Joey's, named after 26-time race winner Joey Dunlop. Site of 2007 crash killing one rider and two spectators (the only spectators ever killed on the course).
MD's 27.00		A18 Mountain Road; 54°17′38″N 04°24′33″W	Placed at a left-bend at the 27th mile from startline, named in 2025 to acknowledge when the multiple race winner Michael Dunlop had surpassed his uncle Joey's 26 wins with his 27th in 2024.
Verandah 29.80		On A18 Mountain Road; 54.26261°N 04.449246°W	Series of four bends, a relatively flat section at a height of 1300 feet (396 metres) at 30 miles around the circuit, before climb resumes at The Bungalow. Road follows contour of slope down from mount Snaefell to the right, with long drop-off to the left, and one irregular corner. In the 1934 Isle of Man TT Lightweight Race, Syd Crabtree, a previous race winner, went over the edge in fog here and was killed. Fatal accident of Gilberto Parlotti, race-leader of a 1972 Isle of Man TT race, contributed to the demise of Isle of Man TT being used for world championship races.
The Bungalow 30.93	View from footbridge	Junction of A18 (Snaefell Mountain Road) and A14 (Sulby Glen Road) and the road-tramway crossing for the Snaefell Mountain Railway; 54°15′04″N 4°27′47″W	Left then right corners, where the course crosses the tracks of the Snaefell Mountain Railway. Vantage point including tramway station, cafe, and a pedestrian bridge over the course. Dominated by Snaefell (elevation of 2036 feet (621m)) and other summits. Named after a former Swiss Chalet-style hotel there, the Bungalow Hotel.
Hailwood's Rise 31.00	View from Snaefell showing Hailwood's Rise road section ascending diagonally to right in direction of race-travel	On A18 Mountain Road; 54°14′55″N 4°27′53″W	Hailwood's Rise is the incline leading from the 'S' bend and pedestrian overbridge at the Bungalow towards Hailwood's Height, both named in memory of Mike Hailwood, the former world champion racer who died after a road car crash in 1981.
Hailwood's Height 31.56		On A18 Mountain Road near the B10 road junction 54°14′36″N 4°28′12″W	Hailwood's Height is a small area with an informal Memorial bench close to the highest point of the course measuring 1,385 feet (422 m) above sea level named in memory of Mike Hailwood, the former world champion racer who died after a road car crash in 1981.
Brandywell 31.65		On A18 Mountain Road at (or near?) B10 road junction 54°14′34.2″N 4°28′10.2″W	A left curve. Its name originates from a nearby water-well that was used by local shepherds to brand and sort flocks of mountain sheep. The area has a stone shelter and an Isle of Man Department of Transport Weather Station.
32nd Milestone 32.07		On A18 Mountain Road; 54°14′07.8″N 4°28′27.5″W	One of the more famous named vantage points; spectators can watch from behind the elevated field-fencing on the left hand (outside) of the course. 32nd or "Dukes" (in honour of English-born former racer turned Manx-domiciled businessman Geoff Duke, OBE) is a sweeping series of three sharp left hand bends on the high speed descent from Brandywell to the infamous right-hander at Windy Corner. The race marshals' stone shelter is on the left side of the course at the centre of the complex.
Windy Corner 32.53		On A18 Mountain Road; 54°13′50.4624″N 4°28′12.302″W	Righthander in open area. Prevailing wind, often strong and sometimes gusty, is channeled up a gully on the left (east). For spectators, the wind "whistles up your trouser-leg as you stand on the corner watching the riders hurl their bikes through the right-hander".
Keppel Gate 33.79		A18 Mountain Road; 54°12′50″N 4°28′47″W	A bend to the left. Another gate was at Kate's Cottage (54°12′40″N 4°28′38″W), itself a well-known landmark, just past.
Creg-ny-Baa 34.52		Junction of A18 with secondary B12 Creg-ny-baa Back Road. 54°12′24″N 4°28′07″W	Right-turn corner, at the Keppel Hotel and its Creg-ny-Baa pub. Creg-ny-Baa means "Manx: rock of the cow." One of three official "fanzones" with temporary grandstands and facilities is placed here. One of the most photographed views on the course is from here, back up a long straightaway from Kate's Cottage.
Gob-ny-Geay 34.92		A18; 54°11′59″N 4°28′30″W	Right-jink in a very fast downhill straight at the 35th Milestone, halfway between the corners at Creg and Brandish. Previously a site for speed-trap, can be spelt differently, e.g., Gob-y-Geay, Gob-na-Geay, Gobnageay
Brandish Corner 35.41		A18 much improved in recent years 54°11′44″N 4°28′40″W	Named after Walter Brandish who crashed, breaking a leg, in the right-hand gutter here while trying to pass a competitor, during practice for the 1923 Isle of Man TT
Hillberry Corner 36.00		At A18 Mountain Road junction with C22 Little Mill Road; 54°11′16″N 4°28′32″W	The run downhill from Brandish bottoms out at Hillberry, before heading steeply uphill towards Cronk-ny-Mona. Once the location of startline for automobile races, including the 1908 Tourist Trophy race for racing automobiles on the Four Inch Course. An iron-framed spectators' grandstand remains at the site.
Cronk-ny-Mona 36.32		A18; 54°11′00″N 4°28′33″W	A steep hill following on from Hillberry topping out with sweeping left hand bend. The hill interrupts the descent from Snaefell Mountain, which resumes at the next vantage point, the right turn at Signpost Corner starting the run down into the outskirts of Douglas town
Signpost Corner 36.67		A18 (Hillberry Road), A18 Sheading Bdy(?), B11(?) Hillberry becomes Avondale Road(?) 54°10′47″N 4°28′13″W	Right turn corner. When a rider passed, observers at a signal station here would telephone ahead to an official in the TT Grandstand area, who would switch on that rider's individual scoreboard light. This warned pit-crew and race officials that the rider had passed Signpost Corner and might shortly be pulling into the pit lane at the TT Grandstand to refuel.
Bedstead Corner 36.90		On A18 Bemahague Road from Signpost, the left-hander at Bedstead (with pedestrian overbridge) leads to a small side-junction accessing The Nook; 54°10′38″N 4°28′17″W	Bedstead Corner and the general area between Signpost Corner and Governor's Bridge was rural through agricultural countryside, developed c. 1990–2015 into large-scale housing/support infrastructure on either side with a recent pedestrian footbridge across, and much improvement to the road/course surface
The Nook 37.08		From A18 Bemahague Road, a right-turn at a small side-junction leads into Old Bemahague Road, followed by a slight-left and short straight before the Governor's Bridge/Governor's Dip link. Section is racetrack-only avoiding 'new' improved road and junction with modern traffic islands. 54°10′28″N 4°28′07″W	"The Nook" (Middle English: a corner or recess) is in the approach to the nearby Governor's Bridge road junction and hairpin bends, on a stretch of the original A18 Bemahague Road that the race course still runs through, although the alignment of the modern A18 has been shifted away.
Governor's Bridge/Governor's Dip 37.30		On Old Bemahague Road, a hard right-turn at hairpin bend with road junction and sudden elevation-drop into Governor's Bridge Dip, followed by a left before exiting with a right from a small, historic side-junction (now an exit-only slip road for race use) to the main A2 Glencrutchery Road 54°10′19″N 4°28′06″W	"Governor's Bridge", a road junction, hairpin bend and bridge over a stream, on a stretch of the original historic course. Traditionally damp and slippery road surface due to overhead tree canopy and little air movement in the dip.
Glencrutchery Road 37.5		A2; 54°10′14″N 4°28′16″W	The slip-road exiting Governor's Bridge Dip at a height of 265 ft (81 m) above sea-level joins the right-side of the Glencrutchery Road close to the mini-island, a straight run climbing a slight incline, crowning-out at 285 ft (87 m) before the slight descent to the finishing line at the TT Grandstand.
Deceleration lane and Return road 38.00		Parallel to A2 Glencrutchery Road; 54°09′59″N 4°28′52″W	The deceleration lane terminates in a hairpin turn-around loop in Nobles Park before leading back to the winners enclosure and parc fermé, situated as part of the paddock complex, for all race finishers

== See also ==
- Registered Buildings of the Isle of Man
