= Kate's Cottage, Isle of Man =

Former shepherd's cottage

Kate's Cottage
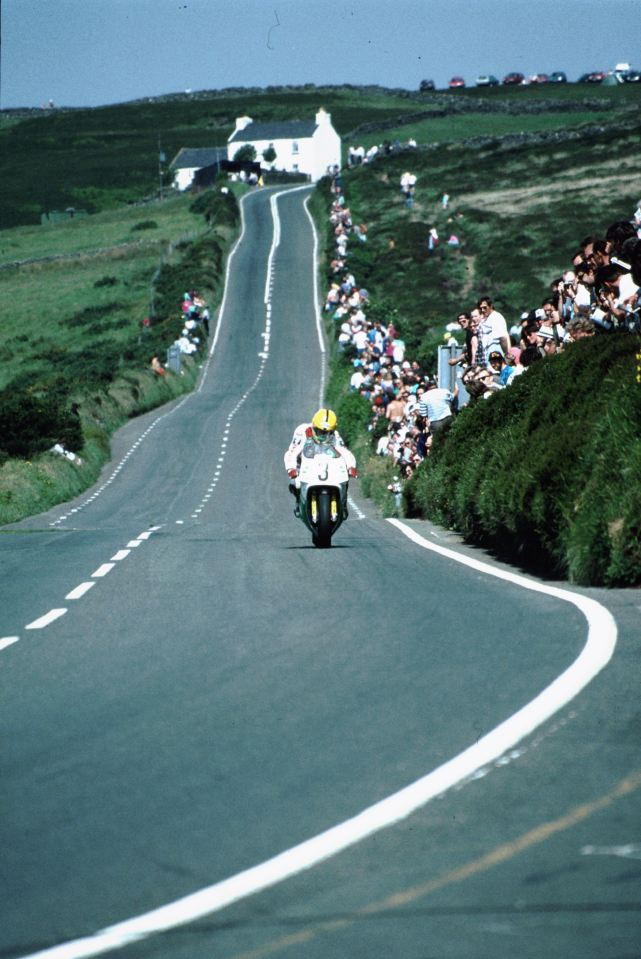
- Joey Dunlop approaching Creg-ny-Baa after the drop from Kate's Cottage

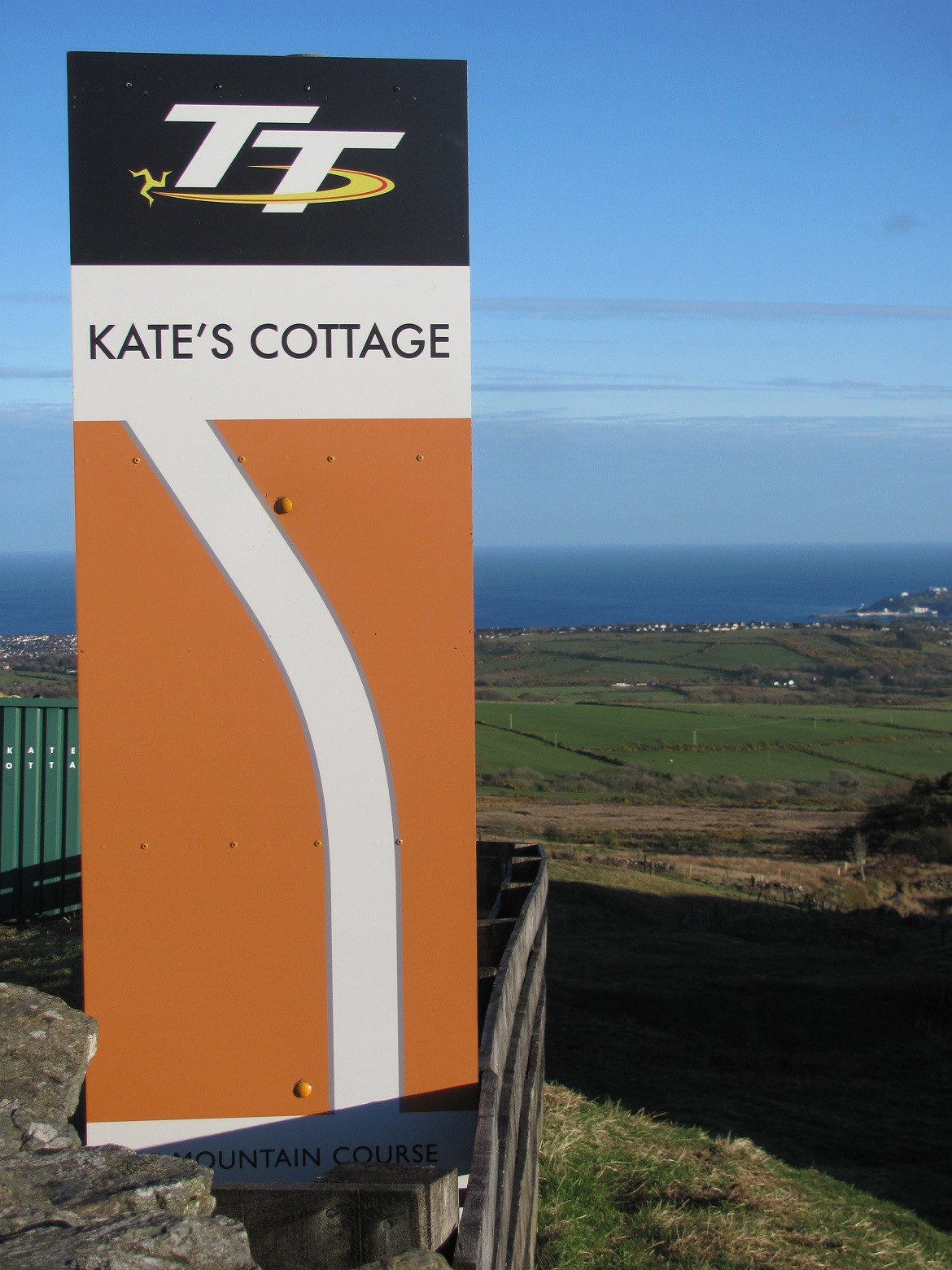
- Left bend sign placed before Kate's

- Location within Isle of Man
- 54°12′40.5″N 4°28′37.4″W

History
- Built: 1864-1866, 1922 (road),

Kate's Cottage, Isle of Man is a large cottage and left-bend, one of the named corners of the Snaefell Mountain Course used in Grand Prix-style motorcycle racing along public roadways of the Isle of Man. It has been asserted in the Isle of Man's program of Registered Buildings that the cottage was built by 1869.

It is a former Mountain Shepherd's cottage situated adjacent to the 34th Milestone racing road-side marker used on the Isle of Man Mountain Course, near to Keppel Gate on the A18, also known as the Snaefell mountain road in Kirk Onchan parish, in the Isle of Man.

== Keppel Gate and the A18 Snaefell Mountain Road ==
The A18 Snaefell Mountain Road was developed in the mid-19th century from a number of pre-existing narrow mountain roads, carting-tracks and horse-paths.

This section of the A18 Snaefell Mountain Road from the Keppel Gate to the Windy Corner was built on sections of common grazing land that were transferred to the UK Crown following the sale of the Islands feudal and manorial rights by John Murray, 4th Duke of Atholl as Governor of the Isle of Man in the period 1824-1829.

The Tynwald Disafforesting Commission of 1860 allowed for the proposed sale of mountain land held by the UK Crown to the HM Commissioners of Woods. A condition of sale was the building of a new mountain road from near Hillberry Corner to the Windy Corner. This included the installation of a number of mountain gates including the Beinn-y-Phott gate near to the Brandywell road junction and Keppel Gate.

The new mountain 'highroads' were built in the period 1864-1866, replacing and bypassing older sections of mountain tracks including the Keppel Gate section. The section of the mountain road from the Creg-ny-Baa road junction to near Kate's Cottage was rebuilt in the period 1892-1893 and again modified in 1922.

== Area of Specific Scientific Interest ==
The mountain land of moorland "heath" of Keppel Gate, including Slieau Ree Mountain and Kate's Cottage is an Area of Specific Scientific Interest (ASSI) and upland conservation "hot-spot."

== Origin of name ==
Formal names of the building include the "Keppel Gate Cottage," or "Keppel Gate." Previously, also known as the "Shepherd's Hut" or Tate's Cottage, now known as Kate's Cottage.

It has often been alluded to that a BBC commentator mistakenly referred to Tate's Cottage as Kate's Cottage. The name may have originated as a printers typesetting error with the mountain cottage at the Keppel mountain accidentally being transposed to Kate's Cottage during the printing process.

"OUR LETTER BOX..."I live in the house known as "Kate's Cottage," but it is a printers mistake as it should be "Tate's Cottage." GEOFFREY RHODES TATE.

The property a former Mountain Shepherd's cottage, owned by the Isle of Man Department of Agriculture, Fisheries and Forestry, was sold at public auction in 1994 and is now in private ownership.

== Motor-sport heritage ==
Contemporary photographs of the RAC Tourist Trophy races for automobiles held in the Isle of Man 1905–1922 and the Isle of Man TT races in the 1920s, show sheep-gates at Kate's Cottage and also at Keppel Gate, with the name Keppel Gate in general referred to both locations.

The Keppel Gate section of the A18 Snaefell Mountain Road was part of the 52.15-mile (83.93 km) Highland Course (amended to 40.38 miles (64.99 km) in 1906) and the 37.5-mile (60.4 km) Four Inch Course used for car racing including the 1904 Gordon Bennett Trial and the RAC Tourist Trophy car races held between 1905 and 1922.

In 1911, the Four Inch Course was first used by the Auto-Cycling Union for the Isle of Man TT motorcycle races. This included the Keppel Gate section and Kate's Cottage and the course later became known as the 37.73 mile Isle of Man TT Mountain Course for motor-cycle racing which has been used since 1911 for the Isle of Man TT and from 1923 for the Manx Grand Prix races.

== Gallery ==
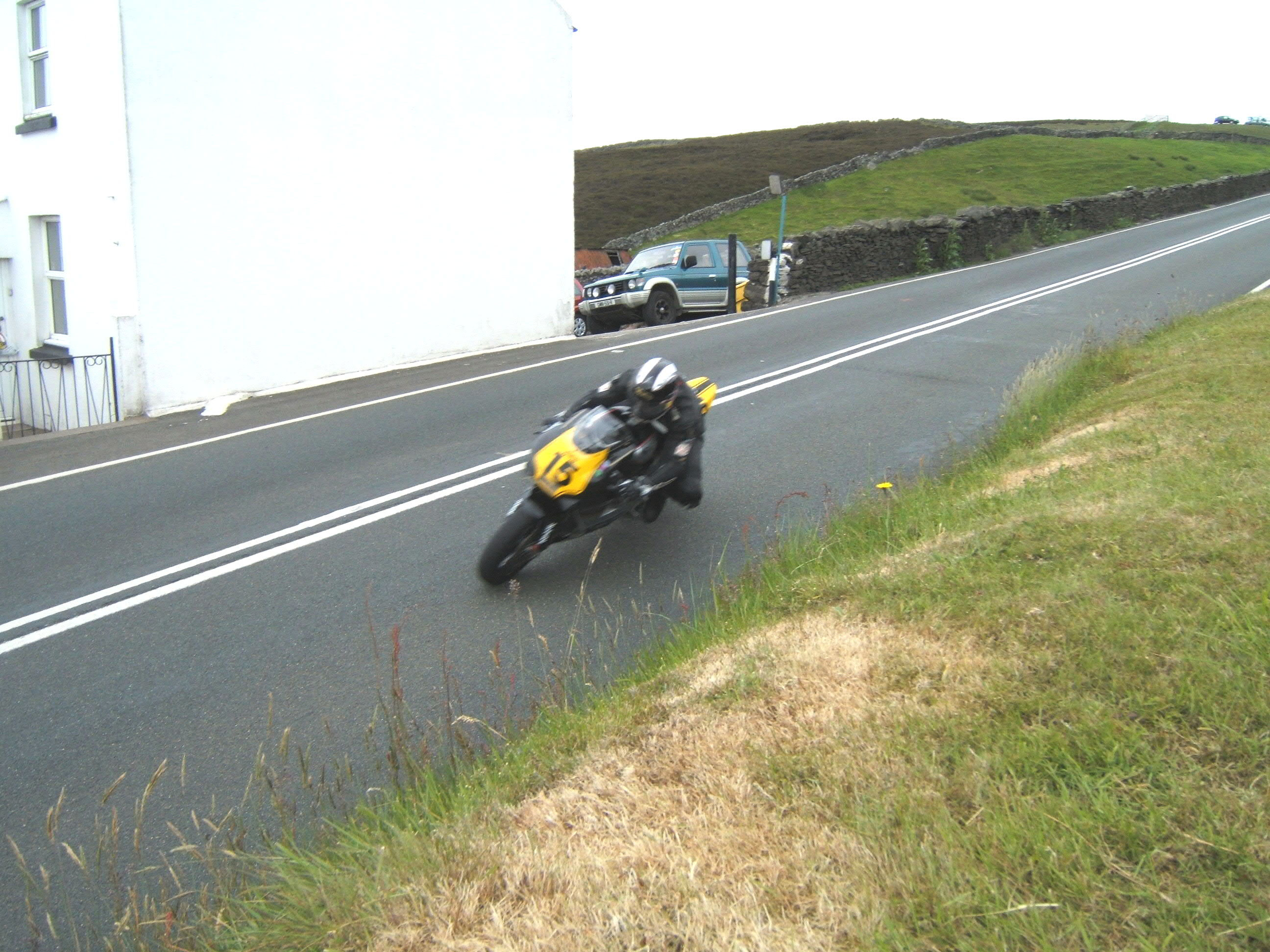
Michael Dunlop racing by Kate's Cottage on a demonstration lap during the 2009 TT races, riding an updated version of the 1990s rotary-engined Norton RCW588

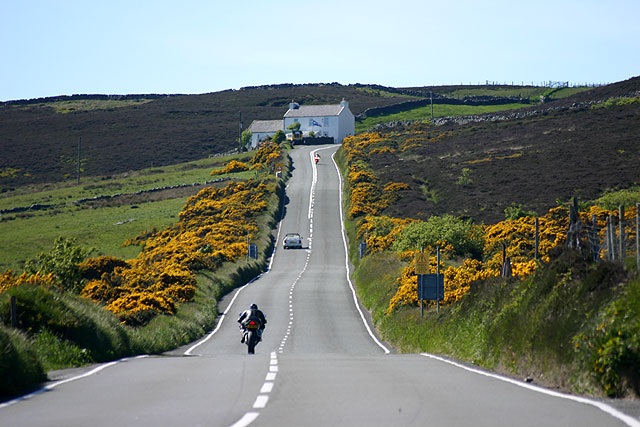
Kate's Cottage, looking in the opposite direction of a lap of the TT course (vehicles shown on left side of road are going north, while race direction would be south) with Creg-ny-Baa behind the camera position
