= Tower Bends =

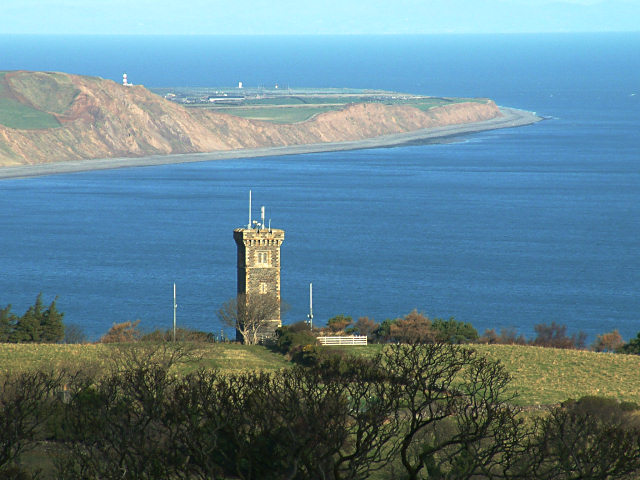
- Albert Tower seen from the Gooseneck with Ramsey bay and Bride hills in background

- Location within Isle of Man
- 54°18′38″N 4°22′48″W
- Location: At the 25th Milestone road marker on the Snaefell Mountain Road designated A18

Tower Bends (in Manx: Ballastowell – the farm of McStoile) is a point on the Snaefell Mountain Course used for the Isle of Man TT races on the Snaefell Mountain Road, designated A18, in the parish of Maughold in the Isle of Man.

Following soon after Waterworks and continuing the climb out of Ramsey town in the direction taken by race competitors, it is a sequence of bends at an elevation of 400 feet (122 metres) above sea level at the 25th Milestone road-side marker on the 37+ mile circuitous-course, measured from the startline at the TT Grandstand. After Tower Bends, the climb continues to the Gooseneck and thereafter the start of the Snaefell Mountain section.

The S-bend corners at Tower Bends were part of the Highland Course and the Four Inch Course used for the Gordon Bennett Trial and Tourist Trophy car races held between 1904 and 1922. Tower Bends is now part of the Snaefell Mountain Course used since 1911 for the TT and 1923 for the Manx Grand Prix races.

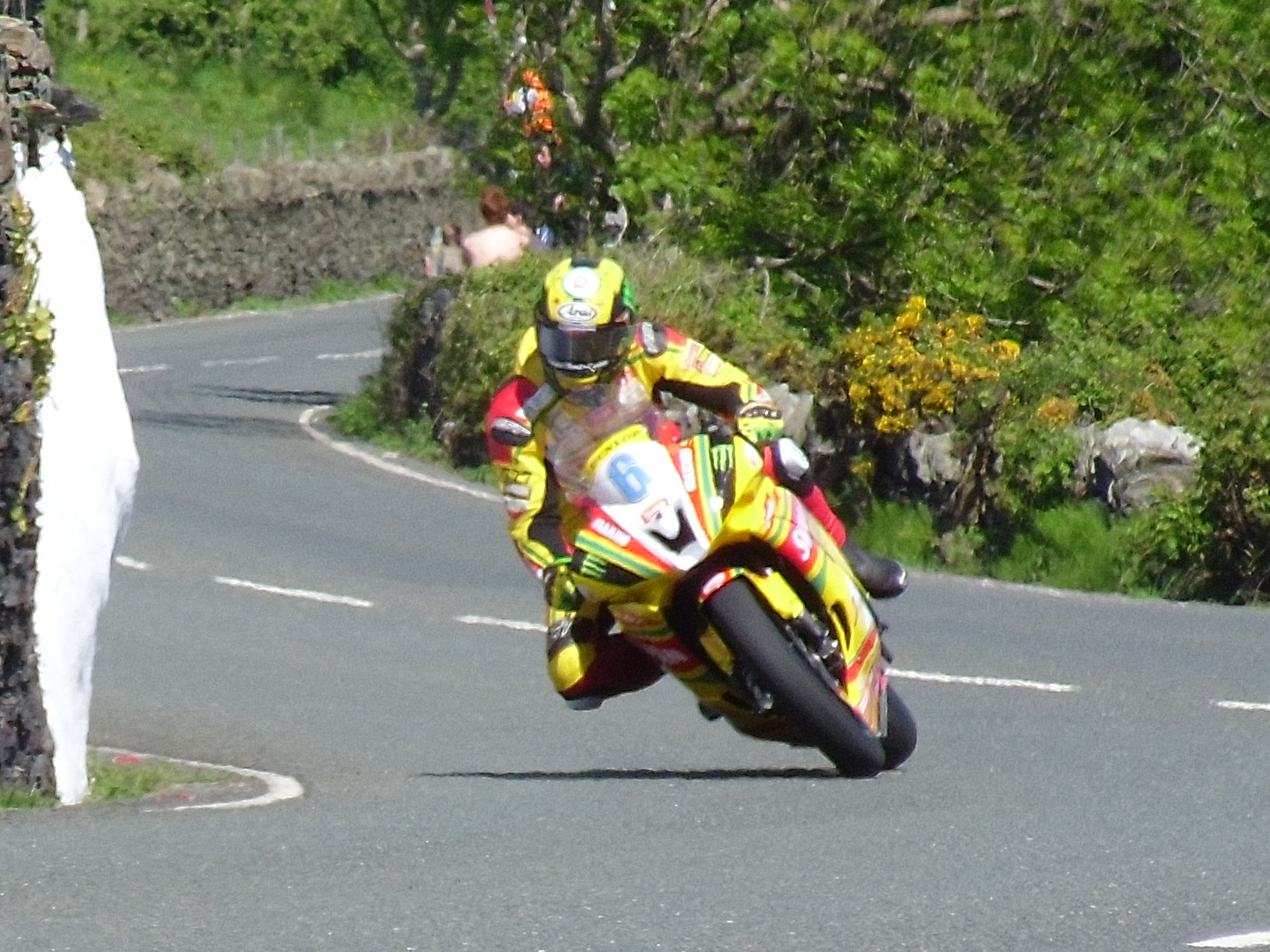
Ian Hutchinson at Tower Bends in the Supersport A race during 2012 TT races

== Name origin ==
During a Royal visit to the Isle of Man by Queen Victoria and Albert, Prince Consort aboard the Royal Yacht HMY Victoria and Albert on 20 September 1847, the Prince Consort was rowed ashore and landed at Ballure shore near Ramsey. After climbing the Lhergy Frissell (from Manx: the hill of Frissell or clan Frazer), the Prince Consort viewed the nearby town of Ramsey and the northern plain of the Isle of Man.

The site became known as Albert's Mount and in 1848 a tower in the Scottish baronial style was built on the site of granite and local slate of 45 feet (13.5 m) in height and 16 feet (4.9m) square at the base.
