= Waterworks, Isle of Man =

Point on a motorcycle racetrack

Waterworks
- The two closely connected bends at Waterworks with their differing radii, showing the correct, optimal motorcycle racing-line through the section

- Location within Isle of Man
- 54°18′47″N 4°22′35″W
- Location: Just before the 25th Milestone road marker on the Snaefell Mountain Road designated A18

Waterworks, Isle of Man, sometimes known as Waterworks Corner, is a point on the Snaefell Mountain Course used for the Isle of Man TT races on the Snaefell Mountain Road, designated as A18, in the parish of Maughold in the Isle of Man.

Following soon after Ramsey Hairpin, it is sequence of two right-hand bends in the direction taken by race competitors, situated at an elevation of 380 feet (116 metres) above sea level after the climb out of Ramsey town, and slightly before the 25th Milestone road-side marker on the 37+ mile circuitous-course, measured from the startline at the TT Grandstand. After Waterworks, the climb continues to Tower Bends and the Gooseneck.

The corners at Waterworks were part of the Highland Course and the Four Inch Course used for the Gordon Bennett Trial and Tourist Trophy car races held in the Isle of Man between 1904 and 1922. Waterworks is part of the Snaefell Mountain Course used since 1911 for the TT and 1923 for the Manx Grand Prix races. For the 1939 TT races, road widening and landscaping occurred at the Waterworks area by the Isle of Man Highway Board.

== Name origin ==
The name Waterworks derives from the nearby Ballure Reservoir, situated high in the hills, built by the Ramsey Water Works Company, established by an Act of Tynwald in 1859, to supply drinking water to the town of Ramsey. In 1881 the reservoir was extended with a dam further upstream to hold 18 million gallons, completed in 1884. In 1948 the Ramsey Water Company was replaced by the Isle of Man Water Board which became the Isle of Man Water Authority in 1972.
