= Hailwood's Height =

Coordinates: 54°14′36″N 4°28′12″W

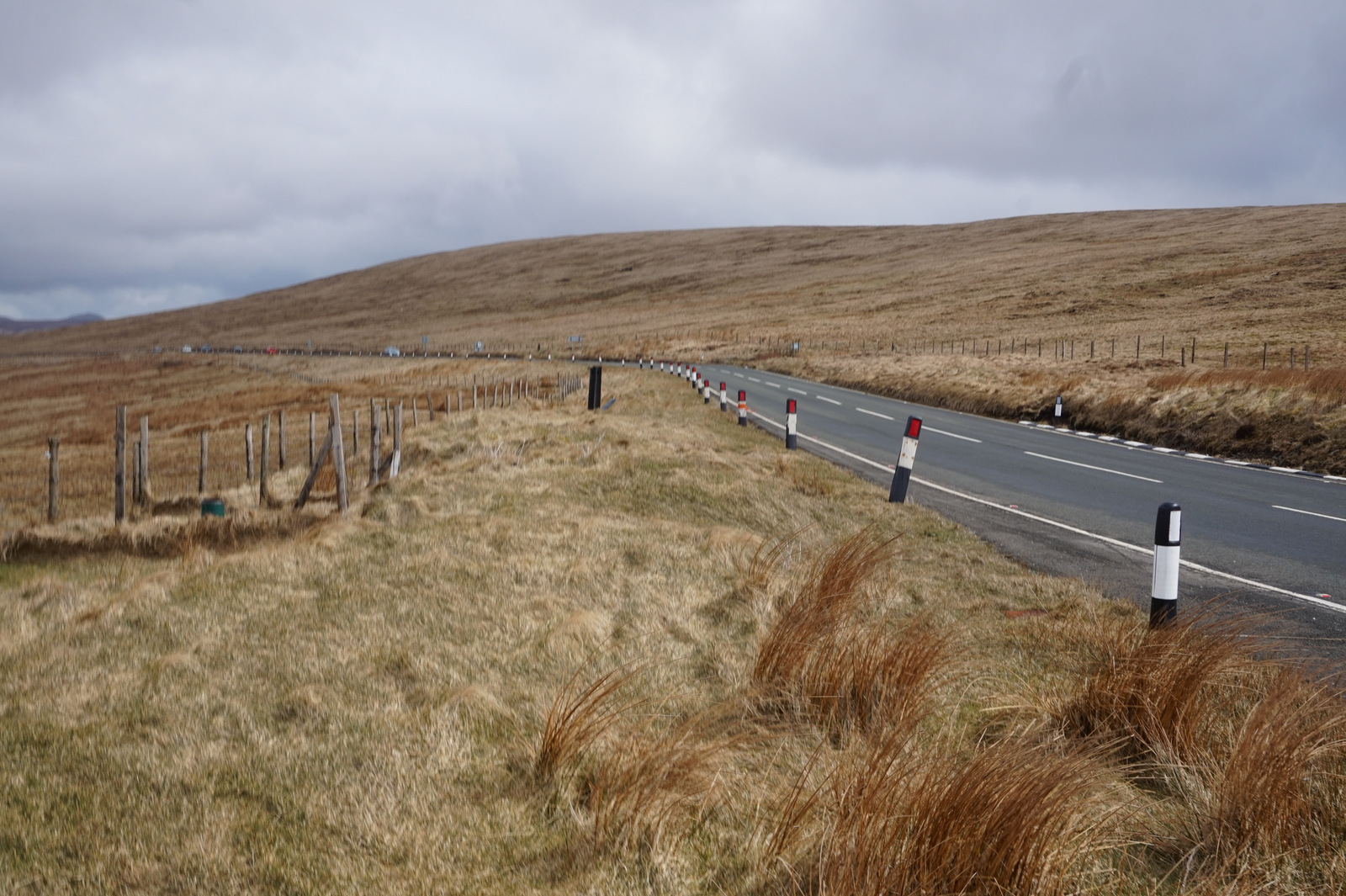
Road at Hailwood's Height

Hailwood's Height, preceded by Hailwood's Rise, is situated between the 31st and 32nd Milestone road-side markers on the Snaefell Mountain Course used for the Isle of Man TT Races on the A18 Snaefell Mountain Road in the parishes of Lezayre and Lonan in the Isle of Man.

The uphill section of the Mountain Course from the Bungalow to the highest point of the course at Ordnance Survey spot height 422 metres (1,385 ft) above sea level near Brandywell was named Hailwood's Rise in memory of Mike Hailwood, the former world motorcycle champion who died in 1981. The highest point of the course adjacent to the Brandywell/B10 road junction is named Hailwood's Height.

Hailwood's Height and Hailwood's Rise were part of the Highland Course and the Four Inch Course used for the Gordon Bennett Trial and Tourist Trophy automobile car races held in the Isle of Man between 1904 and 1922. Hailwood's Height is now part of the Snaefell Mountain Course used since 1911 for the Isle of Man TT and from 1923 for the Manx Grand Prix Races.
