= Ramsey Hairpin =

Point on the Snaefell Mountain Course in the Isle of Man

Coordinates: 54°18′49″N 4°23′01″W

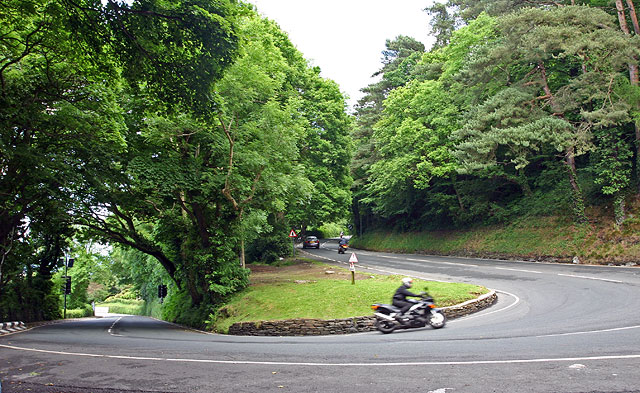

Ramsey Hairpin (in Manx: Ballacowle – Cowle's farm) is a point on the Snaefell Mountain Course used for the Isle of Man TT races on the Snaefell Mountain Road, designated as A18, in the parish of Maughold in the Isle of Man.

It is situated between the 24th and 25th Milestone road-side markers used for the races on the 37+ mile circuitous-course, measured from the startline at the TT Grandstand.

The A18 Snaefell Mountain Road – linking the towns of Ramsey and Douglas – was developed in the mid-nineteenth century from a number of pre-existing tracks and bridle paths. As this section of road was purpose-built from Whitegates, in the Ramsey outskirts, to the Gooseneck at the start of the Snaefell mountain slopes, it reflects typical highway and railway construction practices of the time, including establishing a purpose-built hairpin turn at Ballacowle Glen on the outskirts of Ramsey. The Ballacowle Glen, later renamed as Elfin Glen to attract tourists, was purchased by the Isle of Man Forestry, Lands and Mines Board in 1963 along with the nearby Lhergy Frissel and Claughbane Woods. The combined glens, including a disused slate quarry, cover an area of 64 acres (260,000 m^{2}) on steep mountain-side slopes with many different species of deciduous and coniferous trees.

The Ramsey Hairpin was part of the Highland Course and the Four Inch Course used for the Gordon Bennett Trial and Tourist Trophy car races held between 1904 and 1922, and is part of the Snaefell Mountain Course used since 1911 for the TT and 1923 for the Manx Grand Prix races.
