= Ginger Hall =

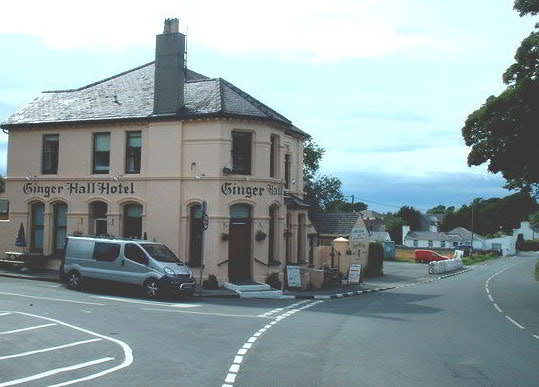
- Ginger Hall Hotel, with the main TT course visible to the right

- Location within Isle of Man
- 54.321°N 4.471°W
- Location: A3 Castletown to Ramsey Road, Isle of Man, UK

Ginger Hall is an uphill left-hand bend following Sulby Bridge on the Isle of Man TT course, a traditionally popular spectator and photographer vantage point with views of motorcycles approaching from Sulby Bridge and exiting towards Kerrowmoar. Situated on a corner-junction, the adjacent Ginger Hall Hotel dates from the mid-19th century and offers refreshments and access to another major viewing area at the Bungalow close to the summit of Snaefell mountain via the B8 Claddagh Road and the A14 Sulby Road.
