= Mountain Mile =

Coordinates: 54°17′43″N 4°24′21″W

The Mountain Mile is a 1.3 mile (2.09 km) section of a purpose-built graded road situated between the 27th and 29th Milestone roadside markers on the Snaefell Mountain Course used for the Isle of Man TT and Manx Grand Prix races on the A18 Mountain Road in the parish of Lezayre in the Isle of Man.

The Mountain Mile begins at the nearby Guthrie's Bridge at the 27th Milestone and incorporates the former East Snaefell sheep-gate, East (Snaefell) Mountain Gate and the Mountain Box. The A18 Snaefell mountain road was developed in the mid-nineteenth century from a number of pre-existing roads and bridle paths. This included the building of a number of sheep-gates including the East Mountain Gate, the Beinn-y-Phott sheep-gate and Keppel Gate. The primary A18 Mountain Road section from Park Lewellyn (North Barrule) to Keppel Gate is a product of the Disaforesting Commission of 1860. This section of the A18 Mountain Road was purpose built, reflecting typical nineteenth century highway and railway construction practices with many small scale cuttings, embankments and revetments which follows land contours with purpose built graded-sections. For the 1934 Isle of Man TT races major alterations to the Mountain Course occurred, including the removal of the East Snaefell Mountain sheep-gate.

The Mountain Mile was part of the Highland Course and Four Inch Course used for the Gordon Bennett Trial and Tourist Trophy car races held between 1904 and 1922, since 1911 for the TT, and from 1923 for the Manx Grand Prix races.
