= Creg-ny-Baa, Isle of Man =

Creg-ny-Baa

- Location within Isle of Man
- 54°12′24″N 4°28′7″W

History
- Built: 1864–1866, 1892, 1935, 1954

Creg-ny-Baa (English: /ˌkrɛɡnəˈbɑː/, Manx: [ˈkʰɾɛɡ nə ˈbɛ]; 'rock of the cow') is located between the 3rd Milestone and 4th Milestone of the primary A18 Snaefell Mountain Road and the road junction with the secondary B12 'Creg-ny-Baa Back-Road', in the parish of Kirk Onchan in the Isle of Man.

== Description ==
The former farm estate of Creg-ny-Baa is located near to the current Creg-ny-Baa road junction. A new hotel, the Keppel Gate Inn was built c.1885 now known as the 'Keppel Hotel' or Creg-ny-Baa public house and restaurant.

The area is also the site of a radio and telecommunications station built in 1939 for the UK General Post Office near to the Creg-ny-Baa road junction.

== Motor-sport heritage ==
The Creg-ny-Baa section of the A18 Snaefell Mountain Road was part of the 52.15 mile Highland Course (amended to 40.38 miles in 1906) and the 37.50 Mile Four Inch Course used for car racing including the 1904 Gordon Bennett Trial and the RAC Tourist Trophy car races held between 1905 and 1922.

In 1911 the Four Inch Course was first used by the Auto-Cycling Union for the Isle of Man TT motorcycle races. This included the Creg-ny-Baa section and the course later became known as the 37.73 mile Isle of Man TT Mountain Course for motor-cycle racing which has been used since 1911 for the Isle of Man TT and from 1923 for the Manx Grand Prix races.

=== Clypse course 1954–1959 ===
To enable motor-cycle and sidecar racing on the new Clypse Course for the 1954 Isle of Man TT Races, during the winter of 1953–54 road widening and re-profiling occurred on the TT Course at the Creg-ny-Baa road junction along with nearby Signpost Corner, Cronk-ny-Mona and the approach to Governor's Bridge by the Isle of Man Highway and Transport Board.

== Gallery ==
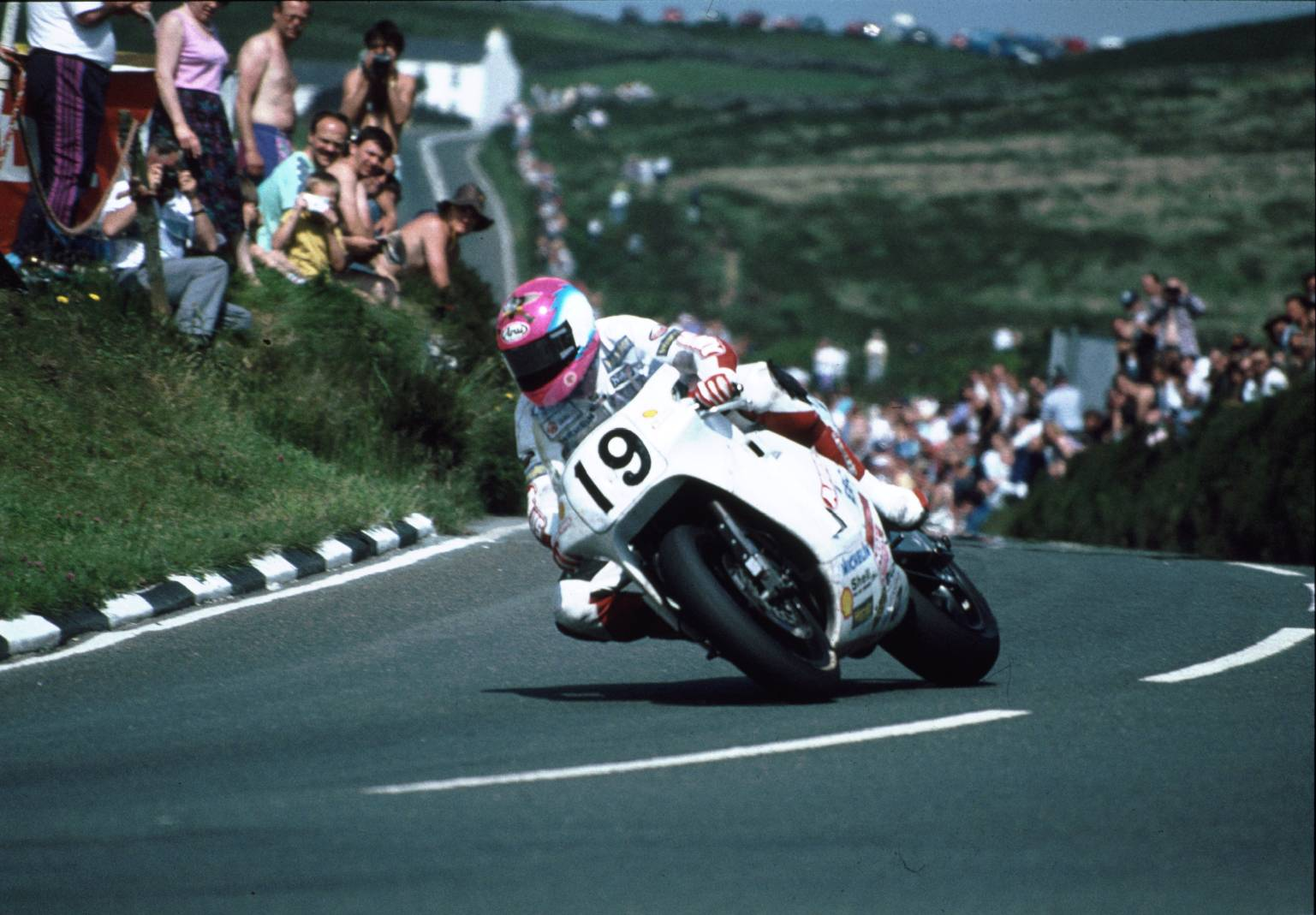
Steve Hislop riding the rotary-engined Norton RCW 588 at the Creg-ny-Baa in 1992, with the white building of Kate's Cottage visible in background

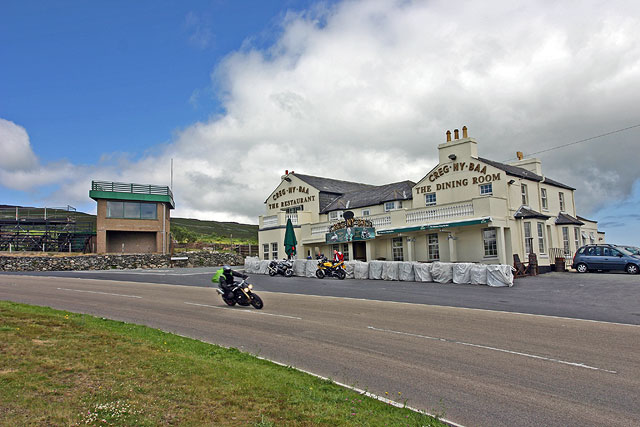
Keppel Hotel or Creg-ny-Baa pub

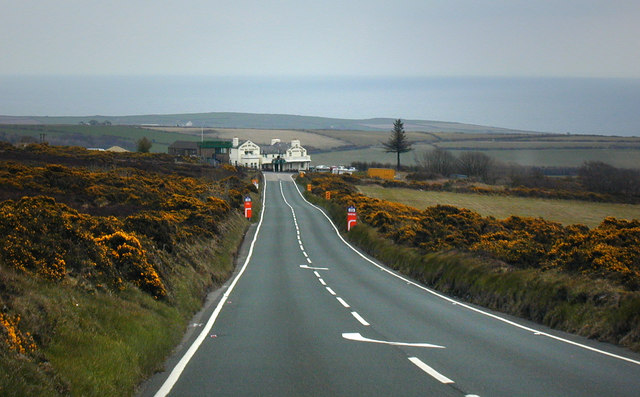
Looking down the steep descent towards the sharp right turn at Creg-ny-Baa, with the emergency slip-road to left of the pub and Kate's Cottage behind the camera position
