= The Bungalow, Isle of Man =

Vantage point on the Isle of Man

Coordinates: 54°15′04″N 4°27′47″W

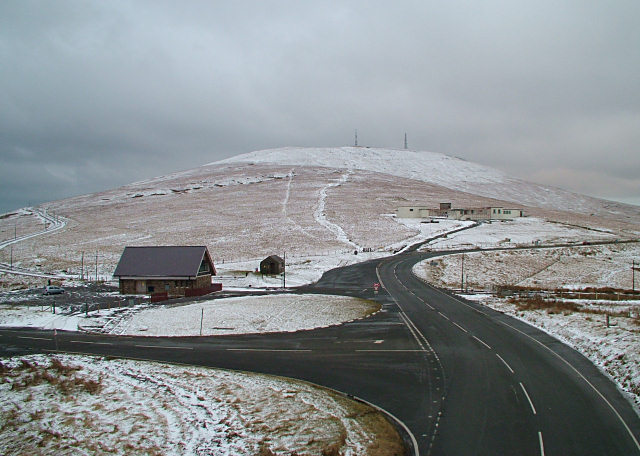
View from footbridge showing A14 side-road junction to left, railtracks crossing the A18 past the Bungalow Station and climbing towards the summit (extreme left), the former motorcycle museum in the flat buildings (centreground/right), Snaefell summit beyond and the TT course (in the reverse direction) curving away to the right towards the Bungalow Bridge and the Verandah

The Bungalow, Isle of Man, one of a handful of better-known vantage points spread around the Snaefell Mountain Course, is situated adjacent to the 31st Milestone roadside marker on the road junction of the primary A18 Mountain Road, the A14 Sulby Glen Road and the road-tramway crossing for the Snaefell Mountain Railway in the parish of Lezayre in the Isle of Man.

The Bungalow tramway-crossing was part of the Highland Course and Four Inch Course used for the Gordon Bennett Trial and Tourist Trophy automobile car races held in the Isle of Man between 1904 and 1922. The Bungalow is part of the Snaefell Mountain Course used since 1911 for the Isle of Man TT and from 1923 for the Manx Grand Prix Races.

The area is dominated by Snaefell Mountain with an elevation of 621m (2036 feet) above sea level and the nearby summits of Beinn-y-Phott (544m), Mullagh Ouyr (491m), Carraghan (500m), Clagh Ouyr (551m) and North Barrule (565m).

The tramway lines of the Snaefell Mountain Railway cross the A18 Mountain Road at the adjacent Bungalow Station. The pedestrian bridge over the road was first erected in time for the 1965 TT races by the Manx Electric Railway Board to allow race spectators access to both sides of the course whilst retaining access to the cafe facilities.

The name The Bungalow derives from the former Bungalow Hotel, a Swiss Chalet design, modular-kit wood-built structure with corrugated roof erected by the Isle of Man Tramway and Electrical Power Co, Ltd as part of the Snaefell Mountain Railway. It was rented to Isle of Man Breweries Ltd for £35 per annum in 1900.

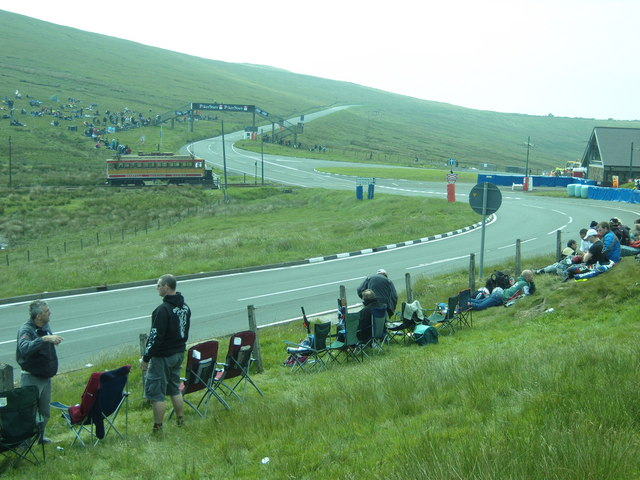
The 'S' bend at the Bungalow, with railtracks crossing the A18 and the Bungalow Station to the right, the TT course climbs up Hailwood's Rise towards Hailwood's Height, in the correct direction of the one-way racecourse

The Bungalow Hotel was demolished during the winter of 1958 and replaced with a small concrete shelter designed by D.W.Calder. This shelter was in turn demolished in 2002 and replaced by the current Bungalow Station for the Snaefell Railway. The former Ministry of Defence buildings at the Bungalow, a former ROTOR radar station, were previously occupied by Murray's Motorcycle Museum which closed, but has reopened at a new site at Santon in the south-east of the island. The buildings were converted into the Victory Cafe in time for the 2022 Isle of Man TT.
