= Verandah, Isle of Man =

The Verandah, Isle of Man is a series of four bends which motorcyclists negotiate at high speed during road racing on the Snaefell Mountain Course on the Isle of Man.

Located on the primary A18 Snaefell Mountain Road which starts at Ramsey and traverses the Snaefell mountain at 1,400 ft (430 m) altitude before leading to Douglas, the Verandah is built around the edge of a Snaefell mountainside slope with adjacent steep drops, between the 29th and 30th Milestone markers measured from the start line at the TT Grandstand. Falling within the parishes of Lezayre and Lonan, it precedes The Bungalow, a major viewing point and visitor attraction on the TT course.

The Verandah series of bends follows the land contours of Snaefell mountain as an embankment with a purpose-built graded road section and reflects nineteenth-century highway construction practices.

== History ==
The Verandah area nearby Stonebreakers Hut was part of the Highland Course and Four Inch Course used for the Gordon Bennett Trial and Tourist Trophy automobile car races held in the Isle of Man between 1904 and 1911. The Verandah is also part of the Snaefell Mountain Course used since 1911 for the Isle of Man TT and from 1923 for the Manx Grand Prix Races.

During the first lap of the 1934 Isle of Man TT Lightweight Race, Syd Crabtree, the winner of the 1929 Lightweight Race and Continental Grand Prix competitor with wins in the Swiss, French and German Grands Prix, crashed in heavy hill fog on the mountain section of the course at Stonebreakers Hut and was killed. For the 1935 Isle of Man TT races, two motorcycle-equipped Travelling Marshalls were employed to search for missing riders, particularly in poor weather conditions on the mountain section.

== Safety ==
During the winter of 1970-71 the A18 Mountain Road was widened by the Highway Board at the Verandah series of bends by cutting into the hillside. This road-widening scheme also included the nearby Stonebreakers Hut or Black Hut, the 30th TT Milestone section, and the nearby Bungalow Bridge.

Despite the safety improvements to the Verandah section, while lying in first place on the second lap during the 1972 125cc Ultra-Lightweight TT Race held in heavy rain, Gilberto Parlotti crashed his 125 cc Morbidelli solo motorcycle at the Verandah section and later died from his injuries.

Parlotti's fatal accident helped to bring about the end of the Isle of Man TT as a world championship event, as his close friend, fellow Italian motorcycle champion Giacomo Agostini, announced that he would never again race on the TT course as he considered it was too dangerous to be included in the FIM World Championship. At the time, the TT was the most prestigious race on the world championship calendar. Other top riders joined his boycott of the event, and by 1976 the event was dropped from the FIM Grand Prix championship schedule. From 1973, any weather conditions that would not allow a rescue helicopter to take off or land would lead to any TT or Manx Grand Prix Race being delayed or cancelled.

Manxman Conor Cummins crashed off the side of the Verandah at high speed during the 2010 Senior TT race, tumbling down the mountainside, breaking several vertebrae and an arm, and damaging a knee.
