= Barregarrow =

District in the Isle of Man

Barregarrow, Isle of Man
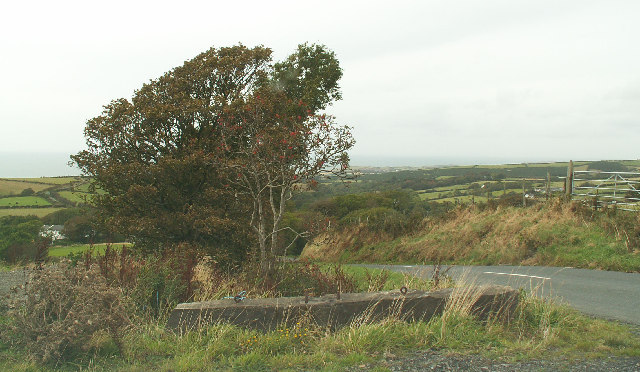
- Sartfield Road, in Barregarrow

- Location within Isle of Man
- 54°15′39″N 4°34′53.4″W

Barregarrow (Manx: Bayr Garroo [bi ˈɡa(ː)ɾo]) is a hamlet and district in the Isle of Man. It is a hilly area and is part of the Isle of Man TT motorcycle race course.

== Description ==
The area of Bayr Garrow or Barrowgarrow is a former area of mountain commons or "rough" pasture situated on a series of ridge-lines formed by a post-glacial lake (Manx: Creggan Jeebylt), opposite to Cronk Urleigh, that drained via the Ballaleigh valley, westwards into the river of Glen Mooar on the A4 Peel to Kirk Michael road. The mountain grazing land of Sartfell Park is on the western side of the nearby Sartfell mountain and Barrowgarrow crossroads.

== Bayr Garroo Wesleyan Methodist chapel ==
The Barregarrow Methodist chapel was visited by John Wesley in June 1781. He wrote in his journal:

Monday 4th…. We then rode through and over the mountains to Beergarrow; where I enforced, on an artless, loving congregation. ' If any man thirst, let him come unto me and drink. ' [John 7:371]....

== Motorsport heritage ==
The Barrowgarrow section of the A3 Castletown to Ramsey road was part of the 37.50-mile Four Inch Course for the RAC Tourist Trophy automobile races held in the Isle of Man between 1908 and 1922.

In 1911, the Four Inch Course for automobiles was first used by the Auto-Cycling Union for the Isle of Man TT motorcycle races. This included the Barrowgarrow section and the course later became known as the 37.73 mile Isle of Man TT Mountain Course, which has also been used since 1923 for the Manx Grand Prix races.

The C4 Ballaleigh Road, with its junction with the A3 Castletown to Ramsey road at the Barregarrow crossroads, has been used as part of timed stages for the Rally Isle of Man, the former Manx International Rally and the Manx National Rally events.

== Gallery ==
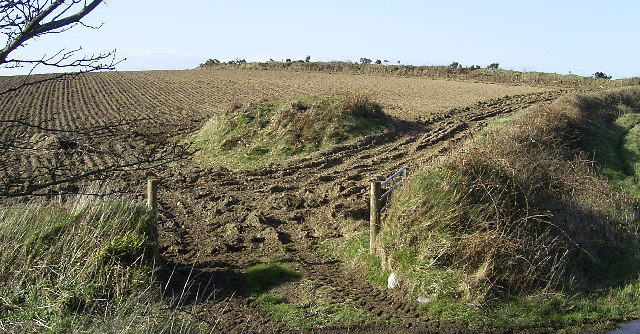
A burial mound in Barregarrow district

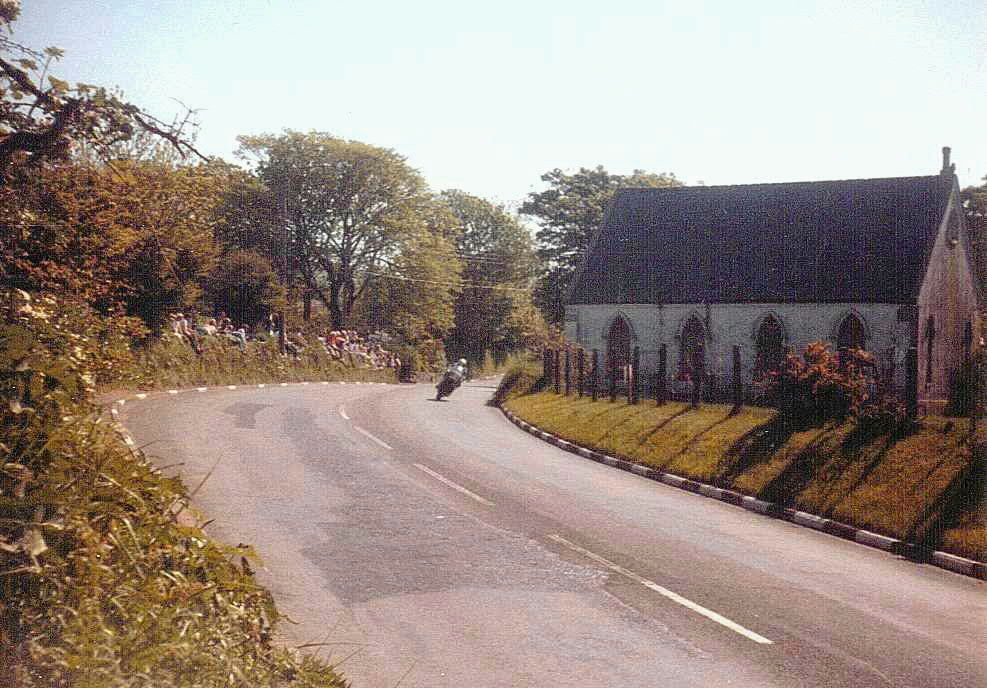
A chapel within the district

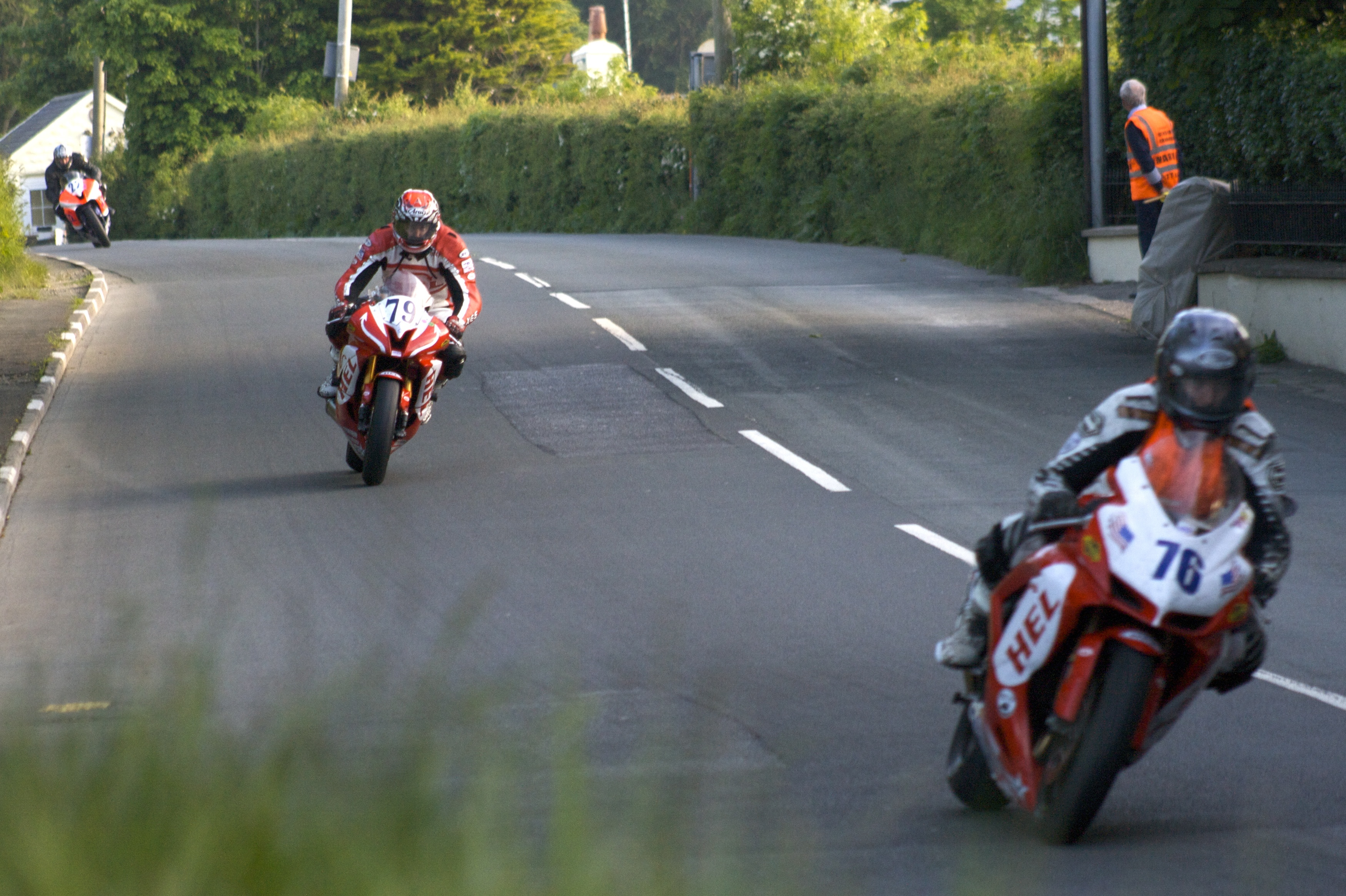
Motorcyclists in Barregow competing in the Isle of Man TT race
