= Whitegates, Isle of Man =

Coordinates: 54°18′59″N 4°23′01″W

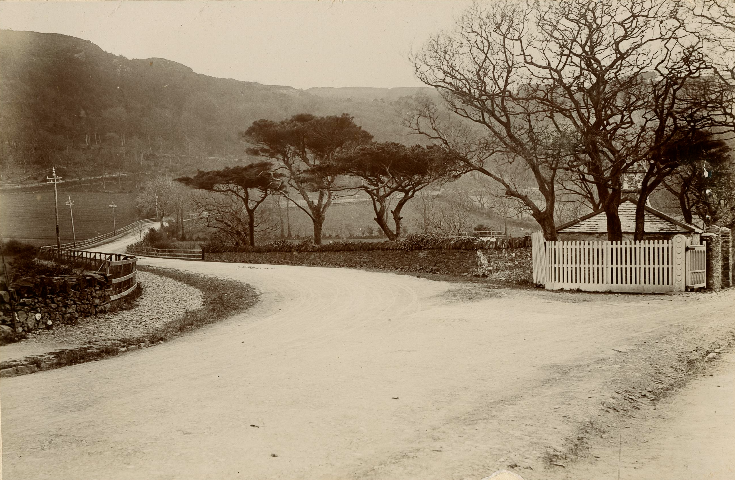
Historic (circa 1860) view of the Whitegates left-bend and the gates themselves

Whitegates, a left-curve, is situated adjacent to the 24th mile road-side marker measured from the start/finish line on the Snaefell Mountain Course used for the Isle of Man TT and Manx Grand Prix motorcycle races. The area also has the historic 15th milestone on the primary A18 Mountain Road, showing the distance from Douglas, Isle of Man to the town of Ramsey.

The name was derived from two former white gates at the entrance of the Claughbane Road and the nearby Claughbane Farm. The bend at Whitegates was part of the Highland Course and the Four Inch Course used for the Gordon Bennett Trial and RAC Tourist Trophy car races held in the Isle of Man between 1904 and 1922. Whitegates is part of the Snaefell Mountain Course used since 1911 for the Isle of Man TT and 1923 for the Manx Grand Prix races.

The road junction at Whitegates is the staging area for the Lhergy Frissell hillclimb, part of the Manx Classic Hill Climb events.
