= Snaefell mountain road =

Road in the Isle of Man

A18

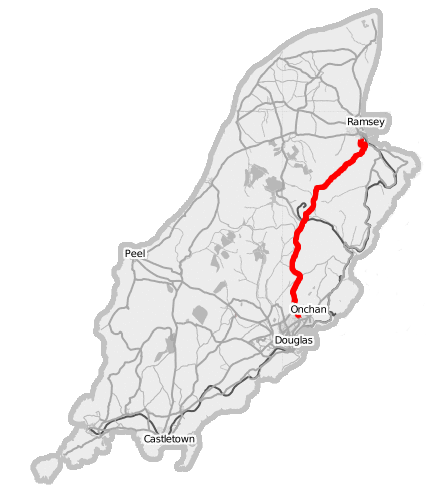

Route information
- Length: 13.35 mi (21.48 km)

Major junctions
- South end: Governor's Bridge, Douglas
- Governor's Road ‘Old Road’/(A18) Bemahague Road; A39 Hillberry Road/B11 Avondale Road; A6 Johnny Watterson's Lane/C10 Scollag Road; C22 Little Mill Road; B12 Creg-ny-Baa Back Road; U31 Nobles Park Road; B10 Beinn-y-Phott Road; A14 Sulby Glen Road; D28 Hiberian/Roan Road; Lezayre Road Ramsey to Andreas Road
- North end: Ramsey; 54°19′14″N 4°23′06″W 54°10′18″N 4°28′06″W

Location
- Country: United Kingdom
- Crown dependency: Isle of Man

Road network
- Roads in the Isle of Man

The A18 Snaefell Mountain Road or Mountain Road (Manx: Giat y Clieau) is a primary main A-road of 13.35 miles (21.48 km) in length which connects the towns of Douglas and Ramsey in the Isle of Man.

== Description ==
The Mountain Road is part of Isle of Man TT Mountain Course or TT Course, a road-racing circuit used for the Isle of Man TT and Manx Grand Prix races, which have been held in the Isle of Man from 1911 and 1923 respectively. In the races, it is one-way from Ramsey towards Douglas. The racing is held on public roads closed for racing by an Act of Tynwald (the parliament of the Isle of Man). It is the oldest motor-cycle racing circuit still in use. The highest point of the course is on the A18 Snaefell Mountain Road between the Bungalow and Hailwood's Height at Ordnance Survey spot height 422 metres (1,385 feet) above sea level, with gradients reaching 14%.

The A18 Snaefell Mountain Road was described in the publication Classic Motor-Sport Routes as:

....you'll notice that once you get beyond Ramsey and the tight left hand hairpin bend to begin the climb onto the Mountain Road, most Manx drivers don't tend to hang about. The sense of freedom given by the liberal road traffic laws and the brooding, mountain and moorland terrain makes driving here an invigorating experience....

== Route ==
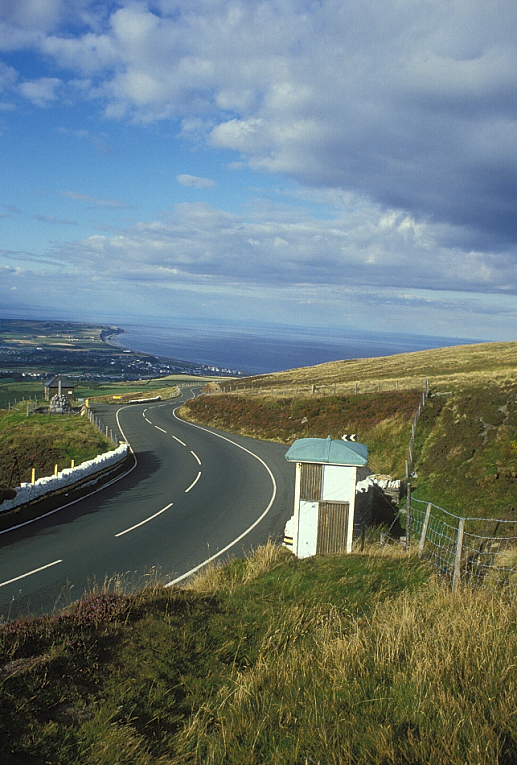
A18 Snaefell Mountain Road at Guthrie's Memorial Looking North to the Point of Ayre.

The A18 Snaefell Mountain Road runs from the A2 Governor's Road at Governor's Bridge in Douglas north to Ramsey, and includes the A18 Bemahague Road from Governor's Bridge to Signpost Corner with the A39 Hillbery Road junction. As part of the Isle of Man TT Mountain Course, in reverse direction it passes through Cronk-ny-Mona and the road junction with the A6 Johnny Watterson's Lane and the C10 Scollag Road. The A18 Road then passes Hillberry Corner and the junction with the C22 Little Mill Road, Brandish Corner, Creg-ny-Baa, Kate's Cottage, Keppel Gate, the Windy Corner and the B10 Beinn-y-Phott Road road junction with Brandywell.

Continuing north, the A18 Mountain Road passes over the Snaefell Mountain Railway tramway crossing at the Bungalow and the A14 Sulby Glen Road, Bungalow Bridge, Verandah, Stonebreakers Hut, East Snaefell Mountain Gate, Mountain Box, the Mountain Mile including Guthrie's Memorial, 26th Milestone, the D28 Hibernia Road junction at the Gooseneck, Water Works Corner, Ramsey Hairpin and Whitegates. The A18 Snaefell Mountain Road at its northern end includes two small sections of road previously held in private ownership between Cruickshank's Corner and the road junctions with the A9 Ramsey to Andreas Road and the A2 Douglas to Ramsey Road situated in the town of Ramsey.

== Origins and history ==
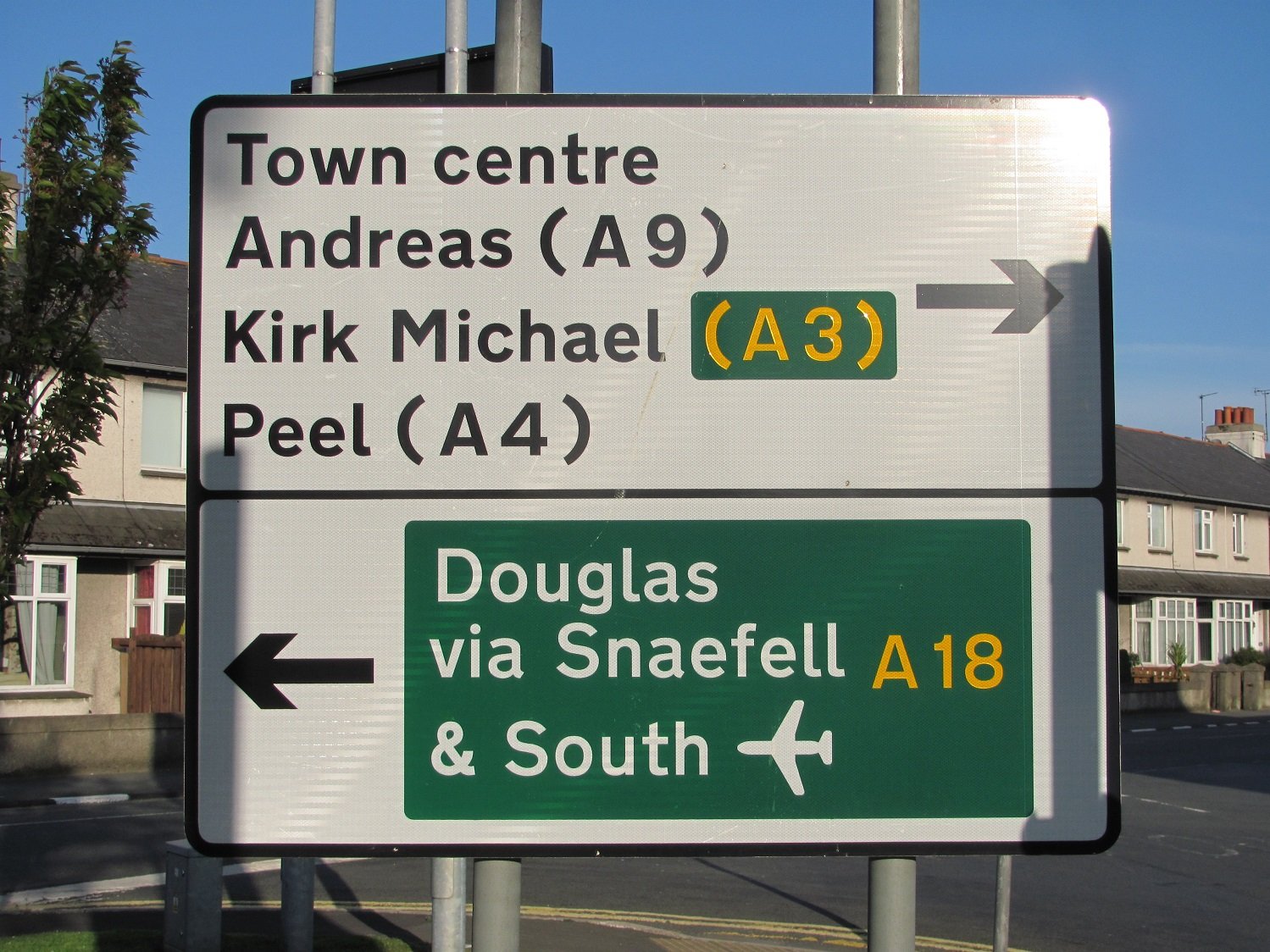
A18 Snaefell Mountain Road sign in Ramsey.

The A18 Snaefell Mountain Road was developed in the mid-19th century from a number of pre-existing roads, cart-tracks and bridle paths. This included installation of a number of sheep-gates including the East Mountain Gate, the Beinn-y-Phott sheep-gate at Brandywell and Keppel Gate. The section of the A18 Snaefell Mountain Road from Keppel Gate northwards to the Gooseneck corner near Ramsey was built on common grazing land that was transferred to the Crown following the sale of the Island's feudal rights by the Duke of Atholl after the Disafforesting Commission of 1860.

As the A18 Snaefell Mountain Road is purpose-built, it reflects typical 19th century highway and railway construction practices, with many small-scale cuttings, embankments and revetments, and follows land contours with purpose-built graded sections intersected by right-angle bends, road junctions and sheep-gates.

== Milestones ==
The A18 Snaefell Mountain Road has small metal milestones from the period of James Garrow as Isle of Man Surveyor-General; they are numbered numerically from Douglas to Ramsey.

== National Geographic top 10 drives ==
In 2014, the National Geographic magazine nominated the A18 Snaefell Mountain Road as No 8 in the Top 10 Driver's Drives.

No 8. A18 Snaefell Mountain Road – The Isle of Man has been a leading motorsport destination since 1904, when racing was legalized on public roads. This 15-mile route between Douglas and Ramsey is the motorcycle-racing circuit used for the Isle of Man TT (Tourist Trophy) and the Manx Grand Prix. The road skirts the peak of Snaefell, the tallest mountain on the island at 2,035 feet (sic). A key attraction for many: The Isle of Man is one of the few British territories with no national speed limit."
