= Graham Memorial =

Coordinates: 54°15′27″N 4°27′31″W

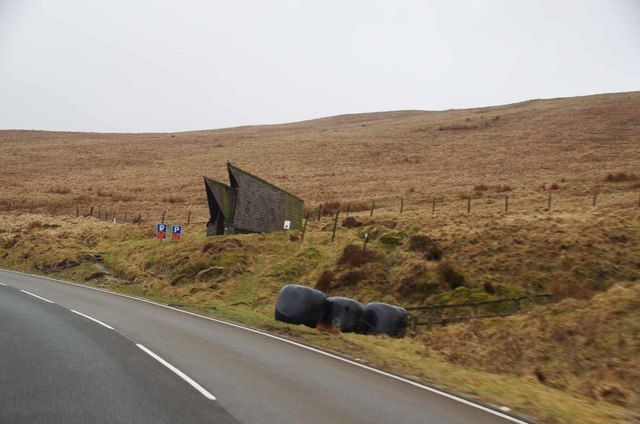
Graham Memorial in 2018

The Graham Memorial (also the Bungalow Bridge or Shepherd's Hut) is a stone shelter situated between the 30th Milestone and the 31st Milestone road-side markers on the Snaefell Mountain Course on the primary A18 Snaefell mountain road in the parish of Lonan in the Isle of Man.

The shelter is in the style of a small alpine lodge, and was built in 1955 in memorial to Les Graham, the former 500 cc solo motorcycle road racing World Champion.

During the winter of 1970/1971 road-widening occurred on the A18 Mountain Road at the Verandah by cutting into the hillside. This also included the corner at the Graham Memorial with the building of an embankment and revetment. The corner is also referred to as the Bungalow Bridge.
