= Brandywell, Isle of Man =

- B10 Beinn-y-Phott Road looking towards Brandywell, Slieau Dhoo mountain and Mount Karin.

- Location within Isle of Man
- 54°14′53.9″N 4°32′27.3″W

History
- Built: 1864-65, 1894-96, 1935, 1938 (road)

Brandywell, Isle of Man (Manx: Chibbyr-y-Phunch) or (Manx: Chibbyr Slieau Maggle) is an area of Mountain Lands of heath moorland and coniferous woodland plantations situated in the Northern Upland Massif in the parish of Kirk Michael in the Isle of Man. The area was previously used by local shepherds due to a local stream and a nearby former venerated water well which was known for its distinctive quality and "brandy" colour of the water.

== Location and description ==
The area of Brandywell is open moorland situated in the Northern Uplands of the Isle of Man including the commons grazing land of Slieau-ny-Maggle Intack (archaic North Park) and Injerbreck Hill close to the private residence of ‘Brandywell Cottage’ a former Mountain Shepherd's Cottage.

The area of Brandywell includes the secondary B10 Beinn-y-Phott Road, the B25 West Baldwin Road, B10 Brandywell / Sartfell Road with the junction with the B26 Ballaugh Glen (Druidale) Road at ‘Brandywell Cottage.’ The area is dominated by the nearby Snaefell Mountain with an elevation of 621 m (2,037 ft) above sea level and the nearby summits of Beinn-y-Phott 544 metres (1,785 ft), Sartfell 454 metres (1,490 ft), Slieau Maggle 427 metres (1,401 ft) and nearby Injerbreck Hill 399 metres (1,309 ft). The Sulby river has its source here, which flows into the nearby Sulby Reservoir (capacity 4,837 million litres), built in 1983.

== Area of Specific Scientific Interest ==
The mountain moorland of the Beinn-y-Phot uplands including Brandywell, Injebreck Hill, Slieau Maggle mountain and part of Druidale adjacent to the Sulby reservoir is an Area of Specific Scientific Interest (ASSI) and upland conservation "hot-spot." The area of Brandywell and the adjacent Brandywell junction with A18 Snaefell Mountain Road, the Beinn-y-Phott uplands, Snaefell, Mullagh Ouhr and Clagh Ouhr mountains is the largest continuous area of grassland moorland of 2,654.60 hectares (6,559.7 acres) found on the Isle of Man.

== Origin of Name ==
The name Brandywell originates from a nearby water-well. For the adjacent property of ‘Brandywell Cottage,’ the publication, A Gazetteer of the Isle of Man writes about a local story:

"...a rich Manxman, who had been successful abroad, hired men to work here. To demonstrate his wealth, he filled the local well with Brandy."

Brandywell in the parish of Kirk Michael was also a place where local mountain shepherds would gather to celebrate Forester's Day and to brand and sort flocks of mountain sheep including the castration of male lambs.

The Manx name Chibbyr Slieau Maggle or Chibber slew ne Magerell means "the well at the mountain of testicles", referring to the castration of sheep at this location.

== Brandywell Corner, A18 Snaefell Mountain Road ==
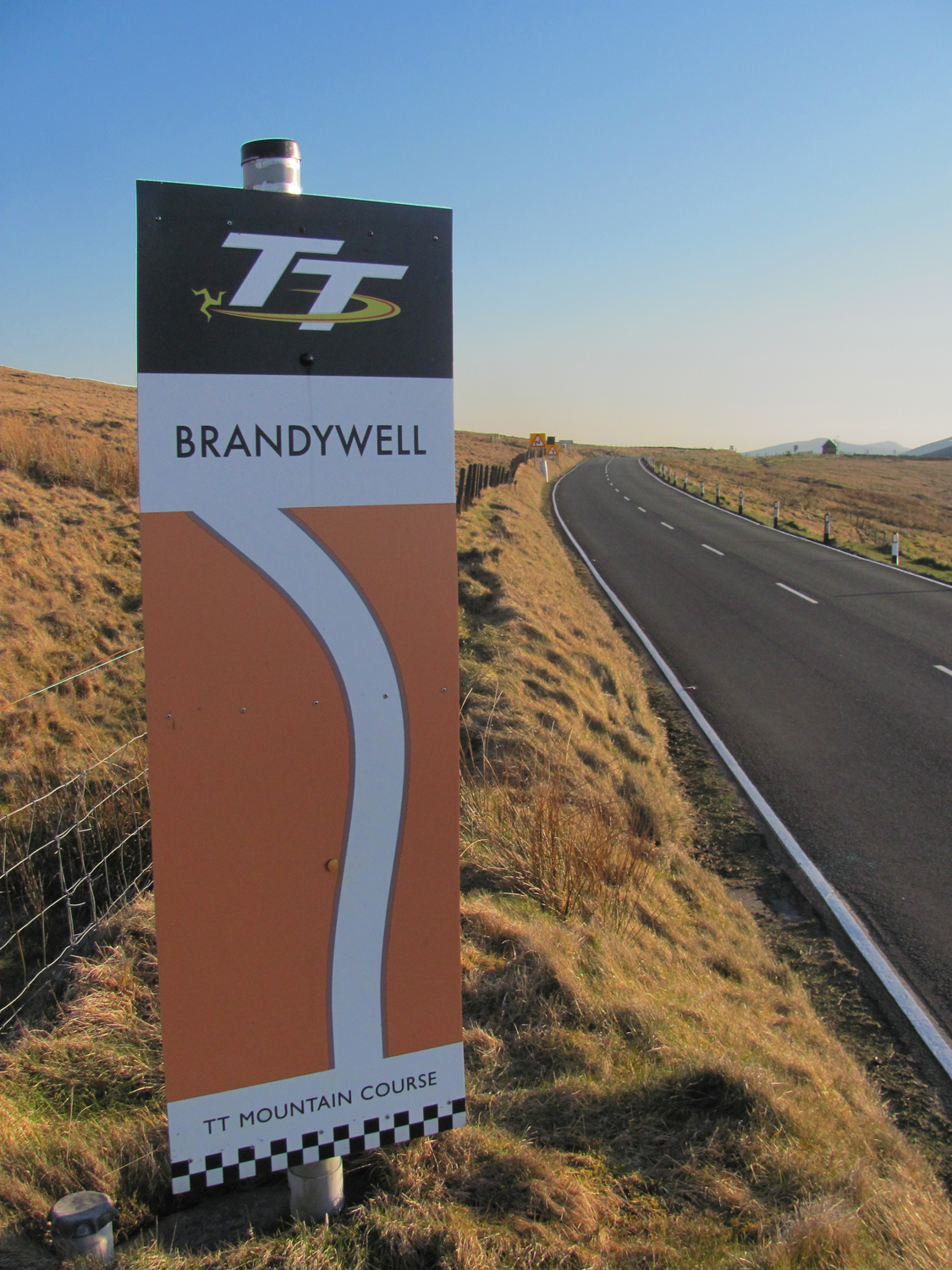
Isle of Man TT Mountain course road-sign on A18 Snaefell Mountain Road, looking south-west towards Beinn-y-Phott mountain

The Brandywell Corner, previously the 'Mountain Gate,' Iron Gate, or 'Brandywell Gate' is the site of a former parish boundary marker cairn and gates for the Crown Commons land of Beinn-y-Phott mountain. It is located between the 6th Milestone and 7th Milestone road-side markers on the primary A18 Snaefell Mountain Road and with the road junction with the secondary B10 Beinn-y-Phott road or Brandywell Road in the parish of Kirk Lonan with the adjoining boundary-line for the parishes of Kirk Braddan and Christ Kirk Lezayre in the Isle of Man. The Brandywell Road junction with the A18 Snaefell Mountain Road is the site of an Isle of Man TT Marshal communication shelter.

The publication, A Gazetteer of the Isle of Man writes:

"....Brandywell Road ....This name has been adopted by the motor cycle fraternity for the sweeping left hand bend.....where the B10 leaves the TT course (A18) a short distance on from Hailwood Rise. The OS Landranger Map 95 further confuses by marking this place as Brandywell."

== A18 Snaefell Mountain Road ==
The A18 Snaefell Mountain Road was developed in the mid-nineteenth century from a number of pre-existing roads, carting-tracks and horse-paths. This included installation of a number of sheep-gates including the Beinn-y-Phott sheep-gate near the Brandywell Corner road junction. This section of the A18 Snaefell Mountain Road from the Keppel Gate northwards to (North Barrule) was built following a recommendation in a report to Tynwald made by the Disafforesting Commission of 1860. The A18 road was built on crown commoners grazing land that transferred to the UK Crown following the sale of the Islands feudal rights by John Murray, 4th Duke of Atholl in 1824.

The Brandywell Corner was subject to road widening with the removal of the Beinn-y-Phott sheep-gate on the A18 Mountain Road for the 1935 Isle of Man TT Races.

== Via Regia footpath and the Millennium Way ==
The footpath at Brandywell Corner is an ancient ridge-way or pathway part of the Via Regia (Royal Way) of the Kings of Mann and now part of the Isle of Man Millennium Way public footpath.

== Motor-sport heritage ==
The Iron Gate section of A18 Snaefell Mountain Road near to the Brandywell road junction was part of the 52.15 mile Highland Course (revised to 40.38 miles in 1906) used for automobile racing including the 1904 Gordon Bennett Trial and the RAC Tourist Trophy automobile races held between 1905 and 1907. The course was modified again in 1908 as the 37.50 Mile Four Inch Course for the RAC Tourist Trophy automobile races held in the Isle of Man between 1908 and 1922.

In 1911 the Four Inch Course for automobiles was first used by the Auto-Cycling Union for the Isle of Man TT motorcycle races. This included the revised Brandywell Corner and the course later became known as the 37.73 mile Isle of Man TT Mountain Course which has been used since 1911 for the Isle of Man TT Races and from 1923 for the Manx Grand Prix races.

== Brandywell Cottage and Brandywell Jumps ==
For timed special stages for the Rally Isle of Man and Manx Rally including the former Manx International Rally and Manx Trophy Rally the area of Brandywell and Brandywell Cottage for motor-sport spectators is described as "….a natural amphitheatre." This includes the B10 Brandywell Road/ C37 Druidale double hairpin at Brandywell Cottage, the B22 West Baldwin ‘link road’ and the adjoining ".....famous Brandywell ‘Jumps’......" The B10 Brandywell Road with its junction with the A18 Snaefell Mountain Road at the Brandywell Corner has also been used as part of a special timed stages for the Rally Isle of Man.

== Mountain bikes ==
The B10 Beinn-y-Phott road section near to the 'Brandywell Cottage' forms the first official manned check-point of Brandywell at 33 kilometres (20.51 mi) for the Isle of Man End-to-End Mountain Bike Challenge. The largest single day mountain bike race in Europe, the 75 kilometres (46.60 mi) route races from the Point of Ayre in the north of the Isle of Man to Port Erin in the south of the Island.

The Isle of Man Cyclefest Gran Fondo cycling event consists of an 82.50 miles (132.77 km) figure of eight course. The cross-over point for the northern and southern loops for the Cycling and Mountain Bike section of the cycling race is at Brandywell Cottage. The southern loop of the Gran Frodo event from Baldwin Bridge to Brandywell Cottage contains the 5.4 kilometres (3.36 mi) ‘Injebreck Hill’ climb (average gradient 6%) as featured in the cycling publication "Another 100 Greatest Cycling Climbs."

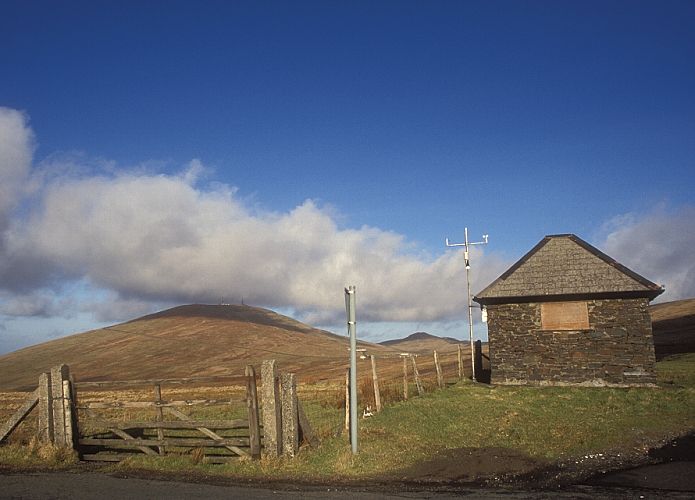
The Brandywell Corner Isle of Man TT Race Marshall's shelter and Automated Weather Station at the junction of A18 Mountain Road/B10 Brandywell Road, looking north-east towards Snaefell Mountain, Clagh Ouhr and North Barrule mountain range.

The Brandywell Corner road junction forms part of two official mountain bike routes. The first A Grand Day Out (cross country loop) a mountain bike trail of 18.5 miles follows the B10 Brandywell Road and the A18 Snaefell Mountain Road and is classified as a Red difficult route. The second official route is the St Luke's & Windy Corner (cross country loop) a mountain bike trail of 17 miles and is also classified as a Red difficult route.

== Weather ==
There is a small automated Weather Station located to the side of the Isle of Man TT Marshall station at the Brandywell Road Junction, along with a similar weather station at the Mountain Box near to the East Snaefell Mountain Gate. It is currently being used by the Isle of Man Department of Infrastructure and the Brandywell weather station is 425 metres (1,394 ft) above sea level near the highest point of the A18 Snaefell Mountain Road. The automated weather station utilises the TT Marshal's telephone line for digital transmission of weather data and due to the absence of an electricity supply is powered by solar panels and a small wind turbine. In 2005, the Brandywell Junction weather station recorded a wind speed gusts of 97 knots (180 km/h; 112 mph) and in 2017 during the extratropical cyclone of ex-Hurricane Ophelia, recorded a gust of 81 knots (150 km/h; 93 mph).

== Gallery ==
Brandywell, Isle of Man
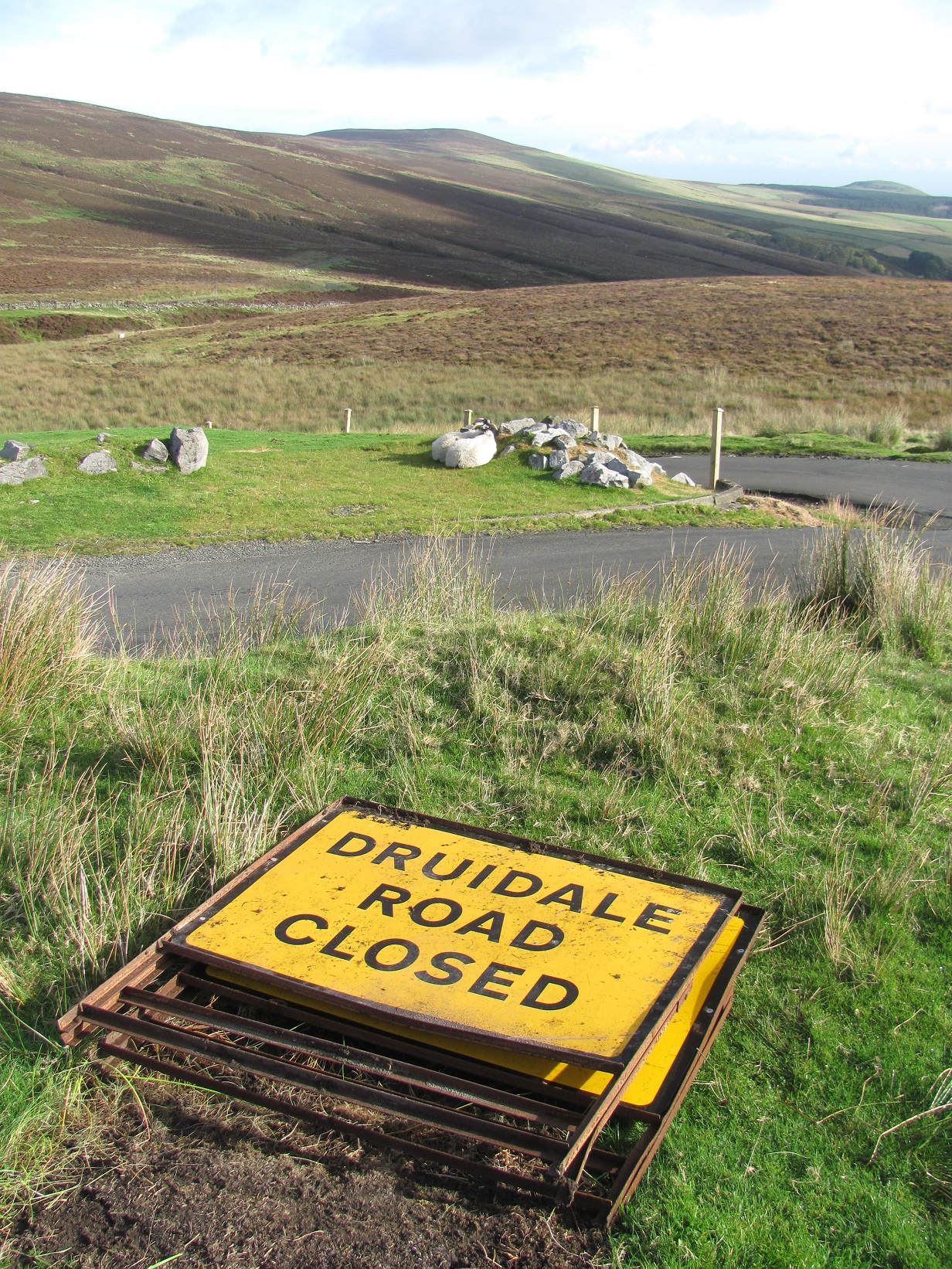
B26 Ballaugh Glen (Druidale) Road at the ‘Brandywell Cottage’ double-hairpin with a north-east aspect towards Slieau Dhoo mountain and Mount Karin.
