= Gooseneck, Isle of Man =

Gooseneck
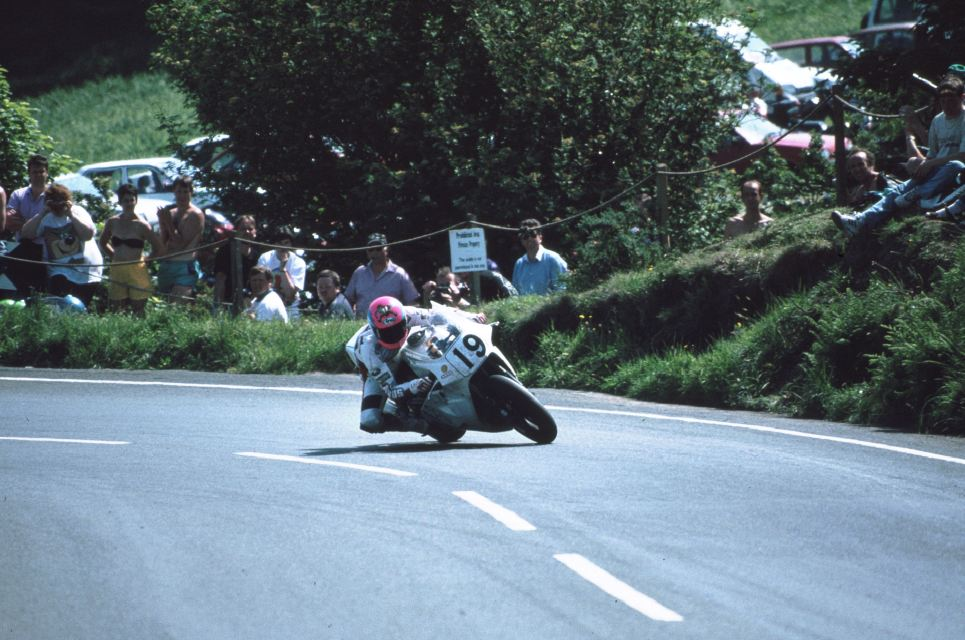
- Steve Hislop riding the rotary-engined Norton RCW 588 exiting the Gooseneck in 1992

- Location within Isle of Man
- 54°18′18.5″N 4°22′55.5″W

History
- Built: 1870, 1938-1939

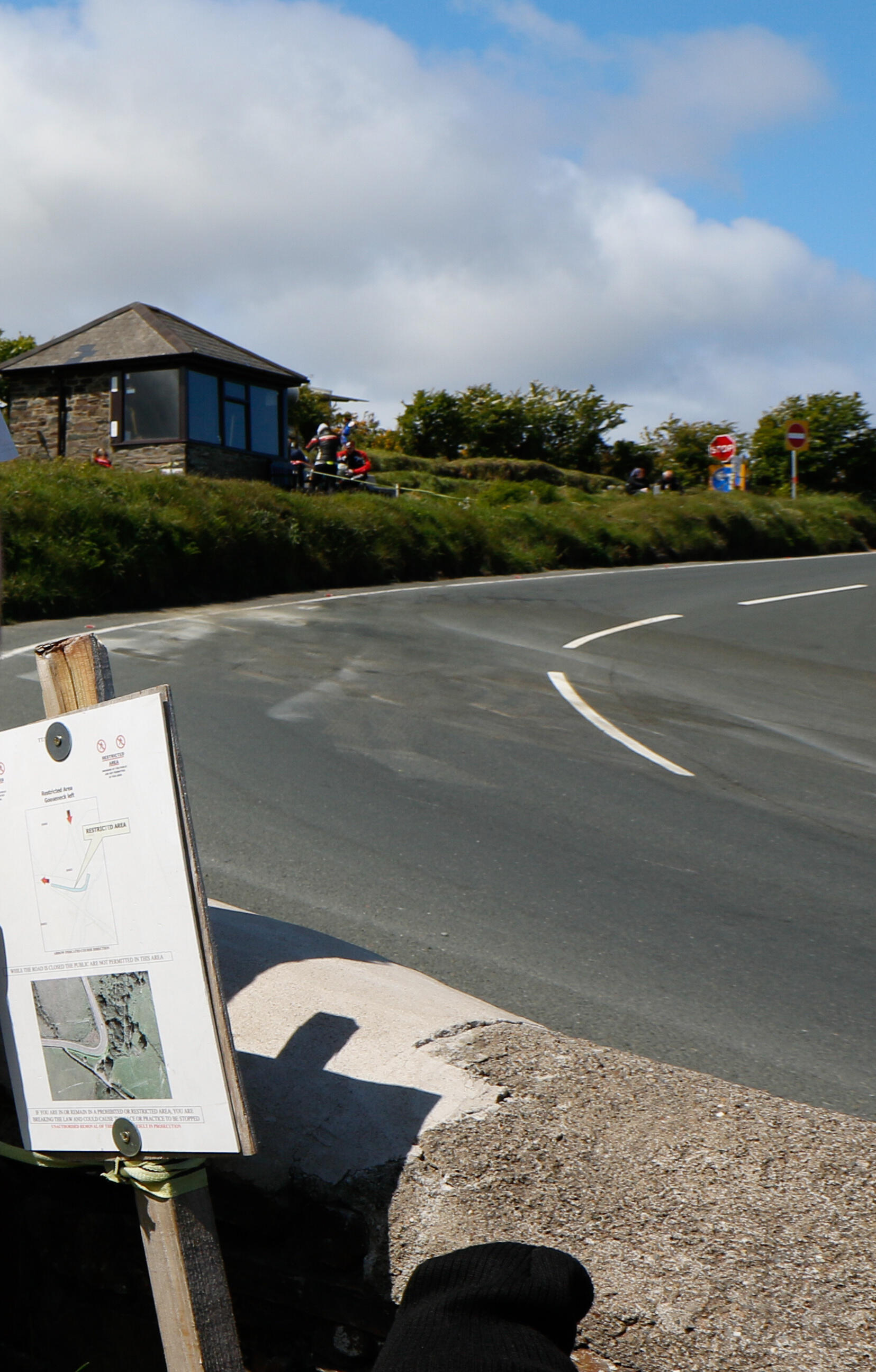
Uphill aspect in 2015

Gooseneck, Isle of Man (in Manx: Roan – the reddish land), is an acute uphill right-bend on the Snaefell Mountain Course used for the TT motorcycle races between the 25th and 26th Milestone racing road-side markers, on the 37-mile (60 km) circuitous-course, measured from the startline at the TT Grandstand.

It is situated on the Snaefell Mountain Road, designated A18, a main two-way thoroughfare from Ramsey to Douglas with an adjacent side-road junction for the minor D28 Hibernia Road, in the parish of Maughold in the Isle of Man.

An historic location on the TT race course after the climb up from Ramsey demarking the end of the tree-line and start of the Mountain section with a height of 550 feet (168 metres) above sea level, the Gooseneck is a popular vantage point for the spectators and a traditional signalling point for TT riders' intermediate race timings from their own back-up crews, one of a number of points around the course where the race machines slow enough to get a good look at the signal boards on the exit. For the same reason, the location has always been popular with professional photographers and film-crews.

The Gooseneck is surrounded by open moorland and uncultivated grazing land of Park Mooar, the Rhowin and North Barrule in the Northern Uplands in the Isle of Man.

== History ==
Gooseneck corner was part of the Highland Course and the Four Inch Course used for the Gordon Bennett Trial and Tourist Trophy car races held between 1904 and 1922. It is now part of the Snaefell Mountain Course used since 1911 for the TT and from 1923 for the Manx Grand Prix races.

== Description ==
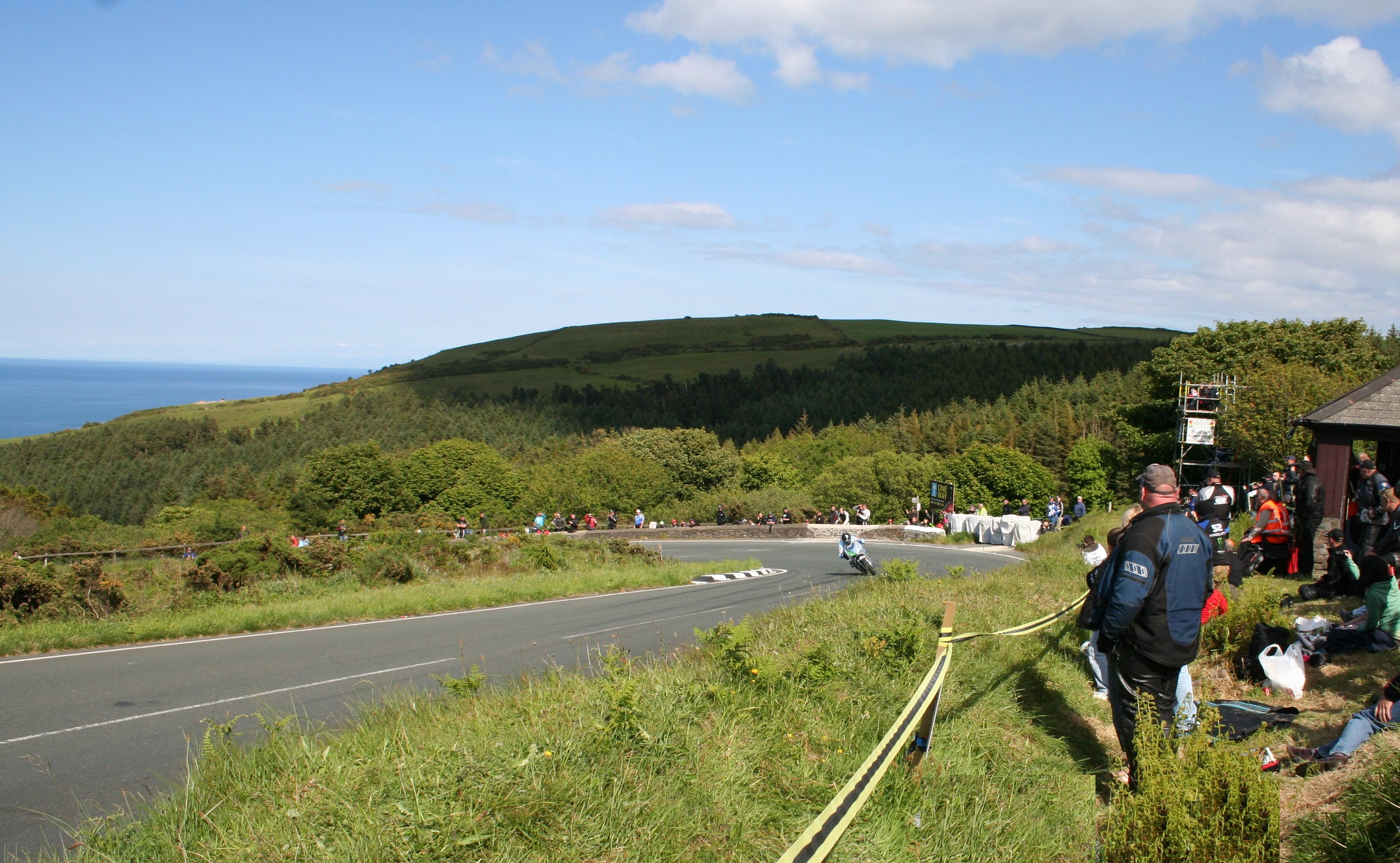
Gooseneck from above, in 2011

The Gooseneck is described as a good location for spectators to be very close to the bikes. Racers are at medium speed, yet can seem faster because the spectators can be so close.

It's also fun for visiting motorcyclists, as the traffic flow is restricted during the race season to be one-way, and there is no speed limit through the Gooseneck and some other locations, while elsewhere there is "intensive police vigilance associated with extensive speed limit enforcement as part of an effort to control, or choreograph the riding behaviours of visitors."

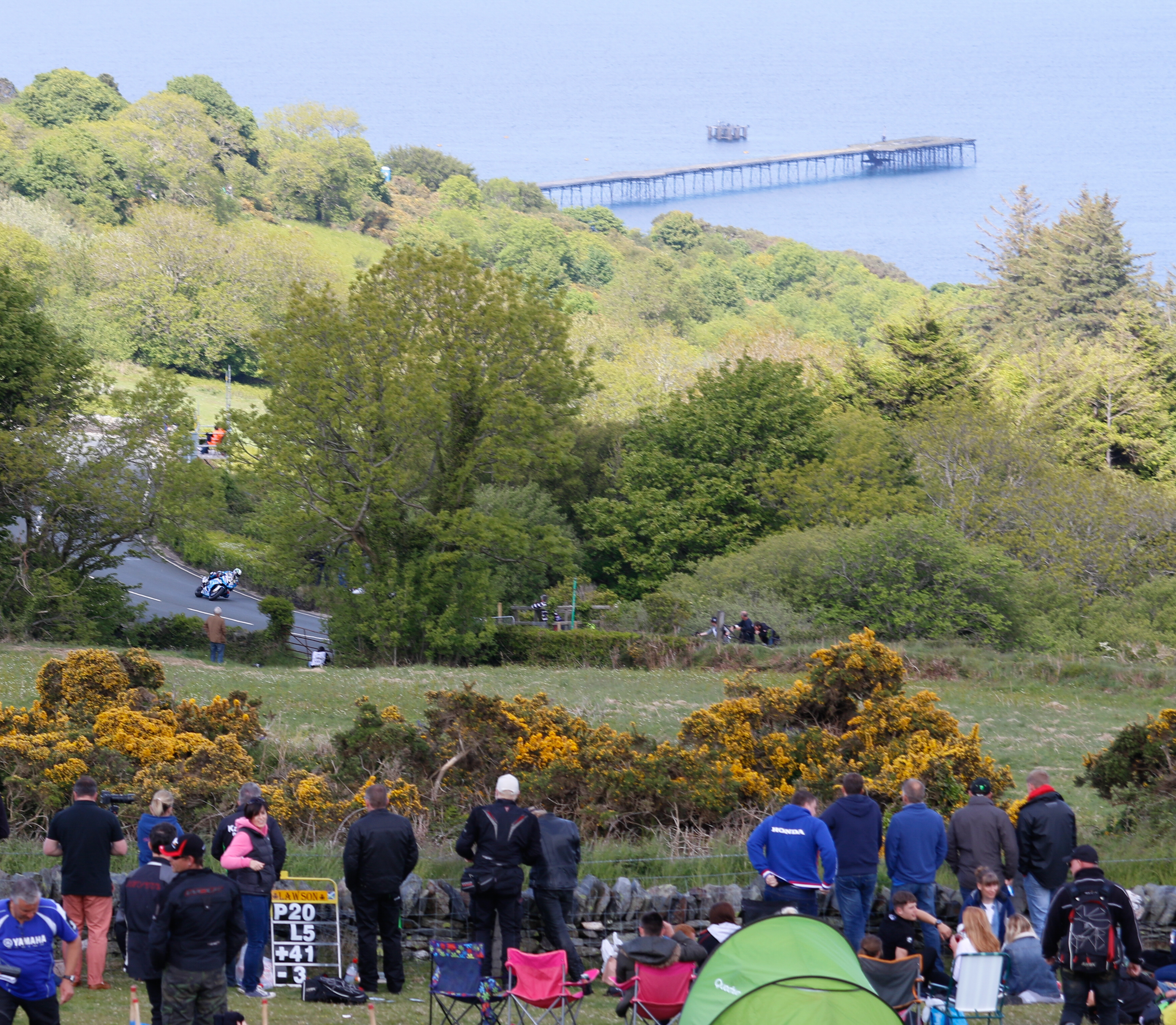
View from above the Gooseneck with rider's signaller at trackside watching the approach road waiting for the competitor and showing the old Queen's Pier, in the Ramsey Bay

The minor side road provides access during the racing from the coast-road leading from Ramsey towards Douglas, when the main course becomes closed for several hours of the racing days.

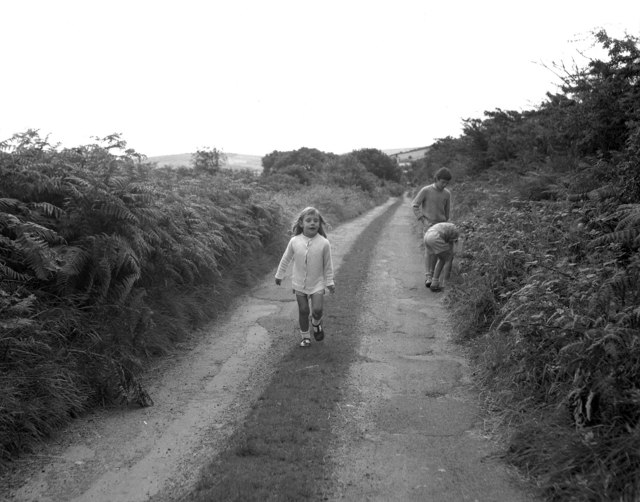
View along the minor side-road
