= Spot height =

Point of known height on a map

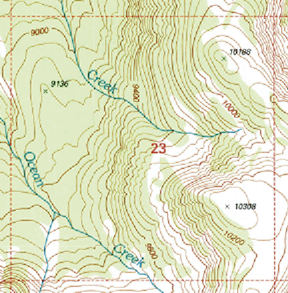
A map of part of Two Ocean Pass, Wyoming, with several spot heights marked with crosses

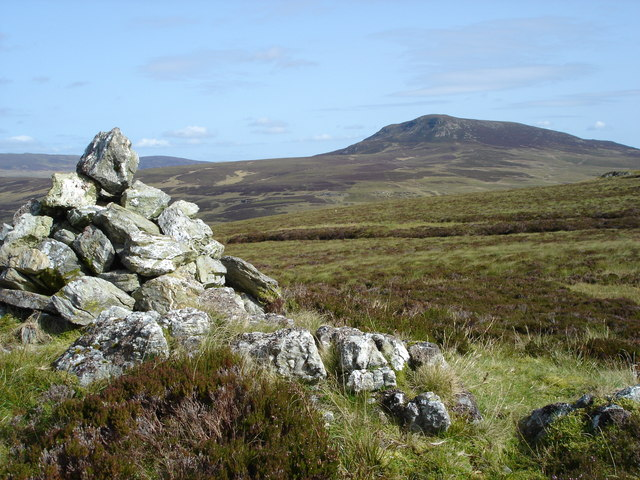
Spot height 479 near Arenig Fach in Snowdonia, Wales, marked by a cairn

A spot height is an exact point on a map with an elevation recorded beside it that represents its height above a given datum. In the UK this is the Ordnance Datum. Unlike a bench-mark, which is marked by a disc or plate, there is no official indication of a spot height on the ground although, in open country, spot heights may sometimes be marked by cairns. In geoscience, it can be used for showing elevations on a map, alongside contours, bench marks, etc.

== See also ==
- Surveying
- Benchmark (surveying)
- Triangulation station
