= Highroads Course =

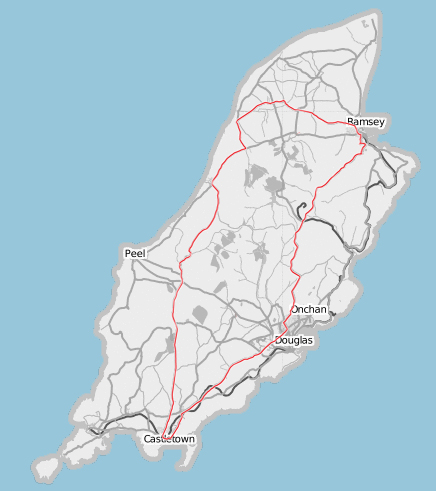
- Location: Douglas, Isle of Man
- Major events: Gordon Bennett Trial, Tourist Trophy
- Length: 52.15 mi (83.93 km)
- Turns: 420+
- Race lap record: 1 hour 31 mins, 9.6 sec (34.2 mph) (John Napier, Arrol-Johnston, 1905)

Highroads Course was a road-racing circuit used for the Gordon Bennett British Eliminating Trial held in the Isle of Man for the 1904 and 1905 Tourist Trophy Race involving touring automobiles and cars. The events were held on public roads closed for racing by an Act of Tynwald (the parliament of the Isle of Man).

== Highroads Course ==
The street circuit course measured 52.15 miles (83.93 km) long from the start-line at the Quarterbridge area in the town of Douglas. The circuit was based on a number of public roads including:

- The primary A5 New Castletown to Douglas road and the A3 Castletown to Ramsey road to Ballaugh Bridge.
- The primary A10 Jurby Coast Road from Ballaugh Bridge to the Ballaugh Cronk and the A13 Jurby Road from the Ballaugh Cronk to Ramsey included the A9 Bowring Road in Ramsey, this section being known as the Sandygate Loop.
- The A2 Albert Road in Ramsey centre, including a section of private road and the primary A18 Mountain Road to the road junction with the A21 road and C10 Scholag Road at Cronk-ny-Mona in Douglas.
- The primary A21 Johnny Watterson('s) Lane at Cronk-ny-Mona, the A22 Ballanard Road, A2 Bray Hill and the A2 Quarterbridge Road in Douglas.

The highest point of the course was at Brandywell on the primary A18 Mountain Road measuring a spot height of 422 metres (1,384 feet) above sea level. 54°14′47.47″N 4°27′57.18″W

=== Short Highroads Course ===
For the 1906 Tourist Trophy Race the Highroad course was amended to a distance of 40.38 miles (64.99 km) to prevent disruption to railway services. The start was moved from Quarterbridge to the road junction of the A2 Quarterbridge Road/Alexander Drive adjacent to the property called 'Woodlands' in the town of Douglas. Again the course was based on a number of public roads closed for racing:

- The primary A1 Douglas to Peel road, A4 Peel to Kirk Michael coast road and the A3 Castletown to Ramsey road from Douglas Road Corner in Kirk Michael to Parliament Square in Ramsey.
- The A9 Albert Road in the town of Ramsey, including a section of private road and the primary A18 Mountain Road to the road junction with the A21 road and C10 Scholag Road at Cronk-ny-Mona in Douglas.
- The primary A21 Johnny Watterson('s) Lane, the A22 Ballanard Road, A2 Bray Hill and the A2 Quarterbridge Road in Douglas.
- The Sandygate Loop from Ballaugh to Ramsey was omitted to reduce overall course length.

== History ==
Motor racing began on the Isle of Man in 1904 with the Gordon Bennett Trial and was originally restricted to touring automobiles. As the Motor Car Act 1903 placed a speed restriction of 20 mph on automobiles in the United Kingdom, the Secretary of the Automobile Car Club of Britain and Ireland approached the authorities in the Isle of Man for the permission to race automobiles on public roads. The act approved by Tynwald, the Highways (Light Locomotive) Act 1904, gave permission for the 52.15-mile (83.93 km) Highroads Course for the 1904 Gordon Bennett Car Trial.
