= 2009 Isle of Man TT =

Annual motorcycle racing event

2009 Isle of Man TT Races
- Isle of Man TT Mountain Course layout

Race details
- Date: 30 May – 12 June 2009
- Location: Douglas, Isle of Man
- Course: Isle of Man TT Mountain Course; 37.733 mi (60.725 km)

Superbike TT
Pole Position	Fastest Lap
(Australia) Cameron Donald	(England) John McGuinness
131.457 mph	130.442 mph
Podium
1. (England) John McGuinness
2. (England) Steve Plater	3. (England) Guy Martin

Sidecar TT Race A
Pole Position	Fastest Lap
(Isle of Man) Nick Crowe/Mark Cox	(Isle of Man) Dave Molyneux/Dan Sayle
116.063 mph	116.010 mph
Podium
1. (Isle of Man) Dave Molyneux/Dan Sayle
2. (England) Philip Dongworth/Gary Partridge	3. (England) Simon Neary/Stuart Bond

Supersport Race 1
Pole Position	Fastest Lap
(Northern Ireland) Michael Dunlop	(New Zealand) Bruce Anstey
126.299 mph	125.549 mph
Podium
1. (England) Ian Hutchinson
2. (England) Guy Martin	3. (Scotland) Keith Amor

Superstock
Pole Position	Fastest Lap
(England) Steve Plater	(England) Ian Hutchinson
126.938 mph	129.746 mph
Podium
1. (England) Ian Hutchinson
2. (England) Guy Martin	3. (Scotland) Keith Amor

Supersport Race 2
Pole Position	Fastest Lap
(Northern Ireland) Michael Dunlop	(England) Steve Plater
126.299 mph	125.384 mph
Podium
1. (Northern Ireland) Michael Dunlop
2. (New Zealand) Bruce Anstey	3. (Isle of Man) Conor Cummins

Senior TT
Pole Position	Fastest Lap
(Australia) Cameron Donald	(England) John McGuinness
131.457 mph	131.578 mph
Podium
1. (England) Steve Plater
2. (Isle of Man) Conor Cummins	3. (England) Gary Johnson

The 2009 Isle of Man TT Festival was held between Saturday 30 May and Friday 12 June on the 37.733-mile (60.725 km) Mountain Course. The 2009 TT races again include a second 600 cc Supersport Junior TT race and the Lightweight TT and Ultra-Lightweight TT races held on the 4.25-mile (6.84 km) Billown Circuit in the Isle of Man. A new event for the 2009 Isle of Man TT races was the one-lap TTXGP for racing motorcycles "to be powered without the use of carbon based fuels and have zero toxic/noxious emissions."motorcyclist

The Blue Riband event of TT Race week was won by Steve Plater claiming victory in the Senior TT and also winning the prestigious Joey Dunlop TT Championship. There were two race wins in a day for Ian Hutchinson with the Supersport Race 1 and the Superstock TT race. The Superbike TT Race was won by John McGuinness and Michael Dunlop was a popular first time winner of the Supersport Race 2. The Sidecar Race 'A' was won by local Isle of Man crew of Dave Molyneux/Dan Sayle. The subsequent Sidecar Race 'B' was abandoned after a serious crash to Nick Crowe/Mark Cox near Ballaugh Bridge on lap 1. The inaugural TTXGP race was won by Rob Barber and Chris Heath was first in the TTXGP Open Class. With three race wins on the Billown Circuit it was Ian Lougher that went on to win the Ultra-Lightweight TT and Lightweight TT Races. The 2nd leg of the Ultra-Lightweight Race was won by Chris Palmer on the Billown Circuit, the 1000 cc Support Race was won by John Burrows with Roy Richardson first in the 600 cc class.

== TT Practice Week 2009 ==
The first practice session for 2009 Isle of Man TT races featured an evening untimed practice session and newcomers control lap on Saturday 30 May 2009 held in almost perfect weather conditions. The first practice session suffered a 40-minute delay due to livestock too close to the course at Ballacrye Corner near Ballaugh. The Newcomers Control Lap was led away from the TT Grandstand by the TT Travelling Marshals and a steady pace set by the accompanying experienced Isle of Man TT competitors including former TT winner and rider's liaison officer Richard Quayle and former Manx Grand Prix winners Nigel Beattie and Paul Duckett. The newcomers control group included a number of new competitors from the United States, Marc Fissette from Belgium, Luis Carreira from Portugal and the Japanese rider Yoshinari Matsushita. The newcomers control group also included one female competitor, Jenny Tinmouth, and a number of outfits for the Sidecar TT accompanied by experienced TT sidecar competitors Roy Hanks/Dave Wells and Tony Baker/Fiona Baker-Milligan. The first competitor away from the TT Grandstand in the main solo class for the first untimed practice session was the Gary Johnson riding a 1000 cc Honda and the 2008 Senior TT winner John McGuinness also riding a 1000 cc Honda set an unofficial lap at an average speed of 125 mph on the Snaefell Mountain Course. After suffering a minor oil leak and completing only two laps, McGuinness stated, "I'm glad to get that one out of the way. The first two laps settled me. I've had butterflies in my stomach all day. I was a bit nervous." The new Norton motorcycle entry ridden by Michael Dunlop suffered mechanical problems and stopped at Glen Helen on the first lap of practice for the motorcycle as did the LCR 600 cc Honda outfit of former TT sidecar winner Nick Crowe/Mark Cox near the 2nd Milestone. The 2009 TT newcomer Scott Jensen from Colorado slipped off at Union Mills and Steve McDonald at Braddan Bridge and both were taken to Nobles Hospital to be later released after a medical check-up.

Practice at the 2009 Isle of Man TT races continued on Monday 1 June 2009 with a 40-minute delay to reorganise TT Marshals on the Mountain Section of the Snaefell Mountain Course. The German TT newcomer, Rico Penzofer and triple 2008 Manx Grand Prix winner Dan Kneen completed their control-lap before the start of main evening practice session. The winner of the 2007 Supersport TT Race, Ian Hutchinson pulled in at Ballacraine on the first lap of Monday practice and John McGuinness recorded a lap of 124.35 mph after a broken gear-lever on the high speed Crosby section left his Honda motorcycle jammed in 6th gear. The 2009 Sidecar TT winner Nick Crowe/Mark Cox again failed to record a time on Monday practice after continuing problems with the engine ignition system. The evening practice for Tuesday 2 June 2009 was held in slightly cooler weather conditions and the problems for the first two sessions of glaring sun and flies were reduced for competitors. It was again McGuinness that dominated practice in the Superbike class with a lap of 17 minutes 27.56 seconds an average speed of 129.661 mph. The sidecar TT class was led by Nick Crowe/Mark Cox with a lap of 19 minutes 39.43 seconds an average speed of 114.697 mph. The Suzuki sidecar outfit of Tim Reeves/Patrick Farrance stopped at Keppel Gate on Monday evening practice with a blocked fuel lift pump and then stopped again on Tuesday evening practice at Sulby crossroads with a snapped throttle cable, although completing the lap after borrowing a new cable from a local lawnmower dealer. The American Isle of Man TT newcomer James Vanderhaar slipped-off at Sulby Bridge and Roger Maher hit the bales at Glen Helen. The 600 cc LCR Honda sidecar outfit of David Wallis/Sally Wilson crashed at the 13th Milestone and the crew evacuated by the Medical Helicopter to Nobles Hospital.

The Wednesday evening practice session was again dominated by John McGuinness riding a 1000 cc in the Superbike class, unofficially breaking the lap record with a time of 17 minutes and 23.46 seconds an average speed of 130.171 mph. This was only the second lap at an average speed exceeding 130 mph and was completed after a heavy landing at Ballaugh Bridge by John McGuinness that his crash helmet collided with the fairing and McGuinness said later;- "I rode the remainder of the lap with a broken screen." In the Supersport Junior TT class, Michael Dunlop riding a 600 cc Yamaha jumped into 2nd place on the practice leaderboard with a time of 18 minutes 5.88 seconds an average speed of 125.085 mph. The 2007 Lightweight Manx Grand Prix winner, Olie Linsdell crashed on the bumpy Glentramman section during Wednesday evening practice. After being stranded at Parliament Square on Wednesday evening with a loose battery, Cameron Donald riding a 1000 cc Suzuki lapped faster than McGuinness in a time of 17 minutes 13.25 seconds an average speed of 131.457 mph in the Thursday evening practice session. A third lap of over 130 mph for the 2009 Isle of Man TT races was recorded by his Suzuki teammate, Bruce Anstey in 17 minutes 23.79 seconds an average speed of 130.129 mph. In the Supersport class, Michael Dunlop set an even faster time for the Junior TT during Thursday practice in 17 minutes and 55.45 seconds an average speed of 126.299 mph. The practice for the Sidecar TT class was red-flagged after a few competitors had left the TT Grandstand after the outfit 600 cc DMR Honda of Karl Bennett/Lee Cain caught fire at Douglas Road Corner in Kirk Michael. Also an oil-spillage on Bray Hill caused a high speed spin for the sidecar of David Atkinson/Jane Wheatcroft at St Ninian's Crossroads which led to the session being halted. The Friday evening practice of 5 June 2009 was held in the same hot weather, with a strong north-west wind on the Mountain Section of the course. The sidecar practice was extended by 30 minutes after the Thursday night postponement, although the times for both solo and sidecar classes were not generally as fast as the previous evening. After setting the fastest time on Thursday evening practice, Cameron Donald missed a gear change on the approach to Keppel Gate, running wide onto a grass bank and crashing on the uneven surface. A dislocated left shoulder and back injury forced Cameron Donald out of the 2009 Isle of Man TT Races.

== TT Race Week 2009 ==
=== Superbike TT Race ===
The 2009 Superbike TT Race was scheduled for mid-day start on Saturday 6 June 2009 and to be flagged away by the former world motorcycling champion Giacomo Agostini and was delayed 48 hours due to inclement weather conditions. The pole time for the Superbike TT race was set by the Australian Cameron Donald in 17 minutes, 13.25 seconds an average speed of 131.457 mph riding a 1000 cc Suzuki motorcycle. The hot weather of TT practice week returned for the 6 lap (226.38 miles) Superbike TT Race held on Monday 9 June 2009. The first competitor flagged away at the start at the TT Grandstand was the 1000 cc Honda of Gary Johnson from Brigg followed by the 1000 cc Honda of John McGuinness with a 10-second starting interval. Starting at number 5 with a 40-second start interval, Bruce Anstey the Suzuki teammate of injured Cameron Donald was the first to hit mechanical problems with a slight engine mis-fire at the bottom of Bray Hill and Bruce Anstey retired his 1000 cc Suzuki at Ballacraine on lap 1 with a fuel sensor problem. It was the 1000 cc Honda of John McGuinness that led lap 1 at the first official timing point at Glen Helen by 1.91 seconds from Conor Cummins riding a 1000 cc Kawasaki motorcycle followed by the Honda brigade of Ian Hutchinson in 3rd place, Gary Johnson, Steve Plater and Guy Martin in 6th place. The lead at Parliament Square, Ramsey was increased by McGuinness to 5 seconds over Conor Cummins and Guy Martin leap-frogging the other competitors to 3rd place and the leading group was joined by the 1000 cc Yamaha of Ian Lougher in 7th place making his 100th Isle of Man TT race start. Over the Mountain Section of the course, John McGuinness maintained a 5.14 second lead over Conor Cummins at the end of lap 1in a time of 17 minutes, 26.61 seconds an average speed of 129.779 mph.

The pace continued on lap 2 with McGuinness increasing his lead with Guy Martin moving into second place and Steve Plater in third with the unfortunate Conor Cummins slipping down to 4th place. With pits-stops at the end of lap 2, John McGuinness now led by 10.79 seconds and set a new outright course record of 17 minutes, 21.29 seconds an average speed of 130.442 mph. A slow pit-stop by Conor Cummins caused by the chain on his 1000 cc Kawasaki caused him to slip down the leaderboard to sixth place behind the Honda of Gary Johnson. The TT Grandstand stop box was overshot by Keith Amor riding a 1000 cc Honda motorcycle on lap 2 incurring a 10-second race penalty. An engine mis-fire forced Keith Amour to retire at Ballacraine on lap 3. After pushing-in on lap 2 the 1000 cc Yamaha of Michael Dunlop retired at the pits and a further retirement at the TT Grandstand was the 1000 cc Kawasaki of Ryan Farquhar with an oil leak from a replacement TT Superstock engine. At Glen Helen on lap 3, McGuinness led Steve Plater by 7.91 seconds with Guy Martin in third place over 10 seconds adrift of the leader. The rest of the chasing pack at Glen Helen on lap 3 included the 1000 cc Honda of Gary Johnson followed by Conor Cummins, Ian Hutchinson, Ian Lougher and the triple 2008 Manx Grand Prix winner Dan Kneen making the top dozen competitors on his debut Isle of Man TT race. The local Isle of Man competitor Gary Carswell and the former winner of the Senior 1997 Manx Grand Prix crashed heavily at the jump at the exit of Ballacrye Corner and was evacuated to Nobles Hospital on lap 3 with foot, rib and knee injuries and a series of minor fractures.

The eight second lead was maintained during lap 4 by the 1000 cc Honda Superbike of John McGuinness over Steve Plater and Guy Martin in 3rd place. The 1000 cc Yamaha of Michael Rutter retired on lap 4 at Parliament Square, Ramsey with a broken gear-lever. At the pit-stops at the end of lap 4, John McGuinness increased his lead slightly to 9.14 with a lap averaging 129.318 mph. With an extra burst of speed McGuinness increased his lead over Steve Plater to 11 seconds on lap 5 and to 19.57 seconds at the official timing point at Ramsey on the last lap. The 2009 Superbike TT Race was won by John McGuinness in a new race record of 1 hour, 46 minutes and 7.16 seconds at an average race speed of 127.996 mph. This provided John McGuinness with a historic 15th win and speaking after the race, McGuinness said;- "I don't know what to say about being ahead of Hailwood, Mike Hailwood is the hero of the people of my dad's generation." In celebrating their 50th Anniversary of Isle of Man TT Racing for the Honda marque, McGuinness mentioned that;- "I had to admit that I was feeling the pressure a bit with so many functions going on and so many Honda people over here expecting the victory....It is great to repay them with a victory and also for Honda to have a 1-2-3 finish in the race." In second place Steve Plater commented about the Superbike TT that "I made improvements in my lap times and I am happy with the way I rode – you never stop learning around here and it is a different mind set to riding the short circuits, which I'done at Thruxton ten days earlier." In contrast, Guy Martin in third place explaining that he thought that his front suspension forks required further adjustment mentioned that "The bike is great in straight lines, but not in corners – I've had cracking pit stops, the bike has not missed a beat, so it is down to me and I'm not here to make up the numbers – I wanted the win."

The 1000 cc Honda of Ian Hutchinson finished in fourth place after the Kawasaki machine of Conor Cummins suffered an engine failure on the Verandah on the last lap. The fifth-place finish in the Superbike TT went to the Honda of Gary Johnson with Adrian Archibald the first Suzuki finisher in sixth place and Ian Lougher finishing seventh after making his 100th Isle of Man TT race start. The 2008 Senior Manx Grand Prix winner, Adam Barclay crashed at Glen Helen in the early stages of the Superbike TT and the TT newcomer Adrian Clark crashed at Sulby Bridge and both were uninjured. At Guthrie's Memorial the TT competitor Roger Wibberley slipped off his motorcycle as did Derek Brien the 2007 Junior Manx Grand Prix winner. After finishing in twelfth place, William Dunlop after the Superbike TT race while on an impromptu testing session on public roads crashed at 120 mph suffering extensive friction burns and Dunlop explained "....I decided to take the 250 Honda up a wee winding road near Port Erin and sort out a few problems....I had just clicked into fifth gear when I lost it and hit a dry stone wall....I had no leathers on and was just riding in my jeans and a top, but thankfully I had my leathers on." The 250 cc Honda motorcycle was broken into two pieces in the accident and required extensive repairs to compete in the Lightweight TT Race at Billown, Castletown later in TT Race Week.

After the Superbike TT race the former World Motor-Cycling champion and Isle of Man TT winner Giacomo Agostini completed a demonstration parade lap of Snaefell Mountain Course riding a MV Agusta motorcycle accompanied by the current world champion Valentino Rossi riding a 1000 cc Yamaha R1 motorcycle. Both Giacomo Agostini and Valentino Rossi had watched the 2009 Superbike TT race from a vantage point on Quarterbridge Road in Douglas and Valentino Rossi described the experience as;- "Watching from Ago's Leap is impressive, speed is unbelievable even from the outside but I think it feels more fast from the outside. With the walls and houses it is a great show and it feels like a GP from 30 years ago..." Afterwards, Valentino Rossi made the presentations to the winner John McGuinness of the Superbike TT race and congratulated McGuinness by saying;- "You are a true gladiator of the sport to ride that fast at the TT." Describing the parade lap, Giacomo Agostini said that;- "We went as fast today as I used to when I raced here."

=== Sidecar TT Race 'A' ===
The pole time for the 2009 Sidecar TT Race 'A' was set by the 600 cc LCR Honda outfit of Nick Crowe/Mark Cox at an average speed of 116.063 mph during the Wednesday evening practice session. On lap 1 the race was led at Ballacraine by the Honda of Nick Crowe/Mark Cox from the 600 cc DMR Suzuki sidecar of Dave Molyneux/Dan Sayle by 1.39 seconds with John Holden/Andy Winkle in third place. This was followed in fourth place by the former World Sidecar Champion outfit of Klaus Klaffenbock/Darren Hope. At the official timing point at Ballaugh Bridge on lap 1 the lead was reduced by Molyneux/Sayle to less than one second, drifting back to 2.25 seconds at the Ramsey Hairpin and Holden/Winkle a further 5.1 seconds adrift. The 600 cc Suzuki sidecar of Simon Neary/Stuart Bond moved into fourth place at the Ramsey Hairpin on lap 1 and Tim Reeves/Patrick Farrance into 5th place.

The lead for Nick Crowe/Mark Cox at the TT Grandstand at the end of lap 1 was 3.99 seconds from the Suzuki outfit of Molyneux/Sayle. The opening lap was an average speed of 115.419 mph for Honda outfit the leaders and news soon filtered through that the 600 cc LCR Honda of Crowe/Cox had retired at Greeba Bridge on lap 2, followed shortly by John Holden/Andy Winkle at the Black Dub on the same lap. The new leaders were Molyneux/Sayle with a lead 28 seconds from the 600 cc Ireson Honda of Phillip Dongworth/Gary Partridge in second place with Neary/Bond now in third place. The lead was increased to 42 seconds by Molyneux/Sayle at the Ramsey Hairpin on lap 2 and completing the second lap in 19 minutes 30.83 seconds an average speed of 116.010 mph and just 0.34 of a second short of the 2005 lap record.." The sidecar of Phillip Dongworth/Gary Partridge had a minor collision with the outfit of Klaffenbock/Hope at Tower Bends on lap 2 with Klaus Klaffenbock suffering a minor hand injury and he stopped at the Gooseneck. The local Isle of Man crew of Karl Bennett/Lee Cain retired at Glen Vine on lap 2 after repairing their 600 cc DMR Honda which caught fire at Douglas Road Corner during Thursday evening practice. The 600 cc LCR Suzuki outfit of Jean-Claude Huet/Jonathan Huet crashed at Brandywell on lap 2 with the sidecar passenger suffering a broken ankle. The 600 cc Honda sidecar of Greg Lambert/Dipash Chauhan retired at the TT Grandstand on lap 2.

The lead on the 3rd lap was now 50.67 second for Molyneux/Sayle increasing to 57 seconds at the official timing point at Ramsey Hairpin. The 2009 Sidecar TT race was won by Dave Molyneux/Dan Sayle in 58 minutes and 59.28 seconds at an average race speed of 115.132 mph and was a new race record. After competing in special gold-flake sprayed helmets to commemorate his first sidecar TT win in the 1989, Dave Molyneux commented on his 14th TT win and equalling the record set by Mike Hailwood, he said that "I guess that I've been racing round here longer than Mike did...." and he said "....Not bad for some old bugger....My bones are a bit stressed now....I've had a hell of a year, but things came good today. Pretty Mint." The new race record was 7.15 seconds faster than the previous 2005 race record and the first Sidecar TT race under 59 minutes for the 3 lap and 113.00-mile event. It was Dan Sayle that commented that Dave Molyneux rebuilt the engine the night before from the parts from 3 engines using the Suzuki workshop engine manual;- "...the outfit felt a lot looser today, skitting around on the road, but Dave's some boy. He only decided to build a fresh motor last night – and believe me he's no engine builder. But it was obviously worth it." In second place for 2009 Sidecar TT Race 'A' was Phillip Dongworth/Gary Partridge at an average race speed of 113.404 mph and Phillip Dongworth said that;- "I've been trying for 9 or 10 years to get to the podium and I'm delighted with our final lap of more than 114 mph too. The final podium place went to the 600 cc Suzuki of Simon Neary/Stuart Bond in third place with an average race speed of 112.600 mph. After being made redundant earlier in the year, Simon Neary nearly missed the 2009 Isle of Man TT Races; – "I only decided to come at the last minute . We did our sums and managed to do it on a tight budget."

=== Supersport Junior TT Race 1 ===
With the delayed Superbike and Sidecar Race 'A' the race to be held on Monday were moved to Tuesday 9 June 2009 with an amended race schedule with the first race being held was the 4 lap (150.73-mile) Supersport Race 1. The pole time for the Supersport race was set by Michael Dunlop at an average speed of 126.299 mph. In what was considered to be a highly contested race it was the unfortunate Michael Dunlop that was the first retirement on lap 1 at Snugbrough near the 2nd Milestone. Despite only setting fifth fastest in practice it was Bruce Anstey riding a 600 cc Suzuki that led at the official timing point at Glen Helen by 1.73 seconds from the 600 cc Honda of Guy Martin with Ian Hutchinson just 0.5 second behind in third place also riding a Honda motorcycle. A further gaggle of riders covered by five seconds included the Honda of John McGuinness in fourth place followed by the Kawasaki of Conor Cummins then Keith Amor with the 600 cc Yamaha of Ian Lougher in seventh place at Glen Helen on lap 1. The places were reversed at the Ramsey Hairpin on lap 1 with Guy Martin now leading Bruce Anstey by 0.3 seconds. The first lap of the Supersport Race 1 was completed by Guy Martin in 18 minutes and 3.37 seconds at an average speed of 125.375 and Ian Hutchinson passed Bruce Anstey for second place on the Mountain Section of the course on corrected time.

In third place at the beginning of lap 2, Bruce Anstey increased his pace passing Ian Hutchinson on corrected time and closed the gap to 0.46 seconds from the leader Guy Martin at Ballaugh Bridge. At the Ramsey Hairpin on lap 2, Bruce Anstey was now leading by 3.35 seconds and the New Zealander shattered the lap record with a lap of 17 minutes and 53.32 seconds an average speed of 126.549 mph and was now leading by 6.86 seconds. After the pit-stops at the end of lap 2 it was Ian Hutchinson that moved into second place leading Guy Martin by 0.3 seconds in third place followed by the Honda riders of McGuinness, Keith Amor and Steve Plater. The pace continued by Bruce Anstey on the third lap with a slightly increased lead of 8.63 seconds and a lap with an average speed of 120.660 mph and increasing the lead to 10.55 seconds at the official timing point at Ballaugh Bridge on lap four. Maintaining his lead at the Ramsey Hairpin on the last lap, it dropped to 7.14 seconds at the Bungalow the 600 cc Suzuki of Bruce Anstey was beginning to slow and was forced to retire at Brandywell with a broken wire leading to an amplifier. This elevated Ian Hutchinson to first place and winning the 2009 Supersport Race 1 in 1 hour, 12 minutes and 56.58 seconds at an average race speed of 121.141 mph. The racing had been close and the winner Ian Hutchinson said;- "Bruce and I were touching fairings going into the Gooseneck. It was enjoyable but frustrating...." In second place was Guy Martin completing the race with a blown head gasket and mentioned that;- "Conditions were nearly 100% but there wasn't the grip there was on Monday. We're chipping away at it. I'm just pleased to finish second. After having trouble with the bike on lap 2, I was looking for a decent pub to pull up at." The third place went to the 600 cc Honda of Keith Amor after a previous third place in the 2008 Supersport Race 1 was handed to him after a technical enfridgment following the exclusion of Bruce Anstey motorcycle and Amor said with this in mind that;- "It's a nice feeling to be finally stepping up onto the podium, though it was hard work. At times we were almost touching, it was so close but I was determined to hang in for third."

=== Superstock TT Race ===
Continuing with the amended race schedule on Tuesday 9 June 2009 the 4 lap (150.73 miles) Superstock TT, the fastest time in practice was set by Steve Plater with an average speed of 126.938 mph. It was the 1000 cc Honda of Keith Amor that held a 1-second lead over the Honda of John McGuinness and a further 1.3 seconds over Ian Hutchinson in third place at Glen Helen on lap 1. In fourth place was the 1000 cc Kawasaki of Conor Cummins followed by the Kawasaki of Ryan Farquhar and the 1000 cc Honda of Steve Plater in sixth place and only 0.82 seconds on corrected time covering the battle for fourth place. By the Ramsey Hairpin on lap 1, it was McGuinness that had moved into the lead by 0.5 seconds from Keith Amor with Ian Hutchinson in third and Guy Martin moving into fourth place. The places changed again on the Mountain Section of the course on lap 1 with John McGuinness setting a new lap record from a standing start for the Superstock class in 17 minutes and 36.72 seconds an average speed of 128.538 mph and leading Ian Hutchinson by 0.95 of a second with Keith Amor in third place at the end of lap 1. A former winner of the Superstock class, Bruce Anstey retired his 1000 cc Suzuki at the TT Grandstand at the start of lap 2.

In a highly contested Superstock TT race it was now Guy Martin leading at Glen Helen on lap 2 by 0.23 of a second from Keith Amor also leading McGuinness by 0.5 seconds and Ian Hutchinson in fourth place. At the official timing point at Ballaugh Bridge on lap 2, it was Ian Hutchinson's turn to leap-frog into second place then moving into the lead by 0.5 of a second from Guy Martin and Keith Amor in third place. Racing to the pits-stops at the end of lap 2, Ian Hutchinson set a new lap record and the first 129 mph lap for the Superstock class of 17 minutes and 31.20 at an average speed of 129.212 mph and Guy Martin also recorded a lap of 129.212 mph inside the short-lived new recorded set by McGuinness on lap 1. The 2.03 second lead held by Ian Hutchinson at the end of lap 2 rapidly disappeared when the filler-cap jammed in the fuel-tank. It was Guy Martin that now in the lead on lap 3 by seven seconds after the fumbled pit-stop by Ian Hutchinson, although this lead was reduced to 2.99 seconds on corrected time at Ballaugh Bridge on lap 3 and just 0.3 of a second at Ramsey Hairpin. At the start of the last lap, Guy Martin was determined to hold and lead Hutchinson by 0.05 of a second with Keith Amor in third place over 10 seconds adrift of the leaders. At Glen Helen on lap 4, Guy Martin increased the lead to 0.88 of a second over Ian Hutchinson and pulling-out a slight margin of 1.2 seconds at the Ballaugh Bridge. The positions were reversed at Ramsey Hairpin on the last lap with Ian Hutchinson now leading by 1.26 seconds over Guy Martin increasing to 5.0 seconds at the official timing point at the Bungalow. The 2009 Superstock TT race was won by Ian Hutchinson with a new race record of 1 hour, 10 minutes and 57.54 seconds at an average race speed of 127.612 mph. After winning two Isle of Man TT races in one day, Ian Hutchinson said;- " I can't believe it....I didn't feel I was on the pace to start with, but I got stuck in and had a much better second lap. We filled the tank right to the brim at the fuel stop and coundn't get the filler cap back in. I considered going off without it, but that would have been stupid." In second place with an average race speed of 127.349 mph was the 1000 cc Honda of Guy Martin who commented;- "Fair play to Ian, there were a few back-markers in the way on the final lap, but he had to deal with them as well, 129 mph – thats going some." The final podium place was filled by Keith Amor with an average race speed of 127.103 mph who commented on the race conditions after the delayed start as;- "It was like night-time racing, quite dark under the trees, but I cannot believe the speeds.". The 2009 Superstock TT race provided a new women's lap record for the Snaefell Mountain Course with TT newcomer Jenny Tinmouth lapping in 19 minutes and 26.08 seconds an average speed of 116.483 mph on the last lap and beating the previous time of 19 minutes 43.8 seconds held by Maria Costello from the 2004 Production TT race. The Japanese rider and TT newcomer Yoshinari Matsushita crashed at the Stonebreakers Hut on lap 3 of the Superstock TT race suffering multiple fractures to both legs and a shoulder injury. A further incident occurred between races to John McBride a TT Travelling Marshal after crashing at Keppel Gate suffering multiple injuries.

=== Supersport TT Race 2 ===
The pole time for the Supersport race was set by Michael Dunlop at an average speed of 126.299 mph set on the Thursday evening practice for the 4 lap (150.73-mile) Supersport Race 2. After the Supersport TT Race 2 was delayed for nearly 4 hours due to rain on some parts of the course between Greeba Bridge and Kirk Michael including hail showers. Despite the mixed road conditions it was the 600 cc Yamaha of Michael Dunlop that was in the lead at Glen Helen by 3 seconds from the 600 cc Kawasaki of Ryan Farquhar on lap 1. This was followed by the 600 cc Kawasaki of Conor Cummins just 0.11 of a second down in third place, followed by the 600 cc Suzuki of Bruce Anstey and the 600 cc Yamaha of Ian Lougher in fifth place. At the Ramsey Hairpin on lap 1, Conor Cummins passed his fellow Kawasaki rider on corrected time, to lead Ryan Farquhar by 3 seconds, but still 11 seconds adrift of the leader Michael Dunlop. An indication of the mixed condition, Michael Dunlop completed lap 1 in 18 minutes and 54.33 seconds an average speed of 119.743 mph leading Conor Cummins by 10.12 seconds and the 600 cc Honda of Guy Martin that was 8.96 seconds adrift in third place. Retirements at the TT Grandstand at the end of lap 1 included the 600 cc Yamaha of William Dunlop, the 600 cc Suzuki of Adrian Archibald and the 600 cc Honda of the 2005 Junior Manx Grand Prix winner Ian Pattinson.

On lap 2 at Ballaugh Bridge, Michael Dunlop had increased his lead to 14.76 seconds over Conor Cummims with Bruce Anstey now in third place. At the end of lap 2, Michael Dunlop had increased the lead to 15.4 seconds and lapped at an average speed of 122.692 mph as conditions on the course improved. The lead increased to 16.6 seconds for Michael Dunlop on lap 3 at Glen Helen with Conor Cummins ahead of the Suzuki of Bruce Anstey by 7.1 seconds and Guy Martin in fourth place. At the Bungalow on lap 3 the lead had increased to 18 seconds for Michael Dunlop completing the lap in 19 minutes 7.45 seconds an average speed of 118.373. As Conor Cummins crossed the finish-line at the end of lap 3 his 600 cc Kawasaki cut-out and he coasted the length of the pit-straight with a dead engine and the TT Grandstand speed-trap recording a speed of 98 mph. Passing the pit-lane exit, the engine restarted and second place was lost to Bruce Anstey on corrected race-time. On the last lap, Michael Dunlop was now leading the Suzuki of Bruce Anstey by 26.48 seconds at Glen Helen and Conor Cummins had recovered from his engine mishap to be 7 seconds adrift of second place. At the Bungalow on lap 4, the lead had increased to 31 seconds for the 600 cc Yamaha of Michael Dunlop as Bruce Anstey in turn had to fight off a late challenge over the Mountain Section of the course by Conor Cummins the local Isle of Man rider.

The 2009 Supersport Race 2 was won by Michael Dunlop in 1 hour, 14 minutes and 34.80 seconds at an average race speed of 121.416 mph. In the mixed race conditions Michael Dunlop commented that;- "My dad gave me the knowledge. I went as quickly as I dared in the damp conditions later on. I had to go for it. It was my spare bike, my better one blew-up in the first couple of miles yesterday. This makes up for all the disappointment....I have been pretty relaxed apart from that. It's been like Paddy's on Tour." The 2009 Supersport TT Race 2 was the second win on the Snaefell Mountain Course after Michael Dunlop had won the 2006 Newcomers Manx Grand Prix and was the 34th win for the Dunlop family over a period of 32 years. In second place was the New Zealander Bruce Anstey at an average race speed of 120.580 mph the margin just 0.71 seconds from the late challenge from Conor Cummins. Also, Bruce Anstey reflected about the mixed conditions and after three non-race finishes said;- "We finally got the gremlins sorted out and I was just glad to cross the finish line – the conditions were very wet and slippery early on but got drier as the race went on. Michael got the move on the first lap and there was no getting him back. In third place was Conor Cummins at an average speed of 120.561 and said of the lap 3 problem;- "I'm really not sure what went wrong with the bike at the end of lap three but it seems OK now. I'm delighted with third but it would be nice to go two better.

=== Sidecar TT Race 'B' ===
The weather delays to the running of the Supersport Race 2 that the 3 lap (113.00 miles) Sidecar Race 'B' was postponed to early evening. The leaders on the road and on corrected race time on lap 1 at Glen Helen were the 600 cc LCR Honda outfit of Nick Crowe/Mark Cox by 0.65 of a second from the 600 cc DMR Suzuki of Dave Molyneux/Dan Sayle. On approaching Ballacobb near Ballaugh Bridge the Honda sidecar of Nick Crowe/Mark Cox crashed heavily and caught fire. The two crew were airflifted to Nobles Hospital by the Medical Helicopter with extensive injuries. The Sidecar Race 'B' was red-flagged and the following sidecar competitors were stopped at various points of the course before Ballaugh Bridge. These sidecar crews were escorted back to the TT Grandstand in the reverse direction by the TT Travelling Marshals to restart the race and later a decision was made by the organisers to abandon the 2009 Sidecar TT Race 'B'. It is believed that the onboard camera on the outfit of Nick Crowe/Mark Cox shows a Brown Hare running in front of the sidecar immediately before the crash.

=== TTXGP Race ===
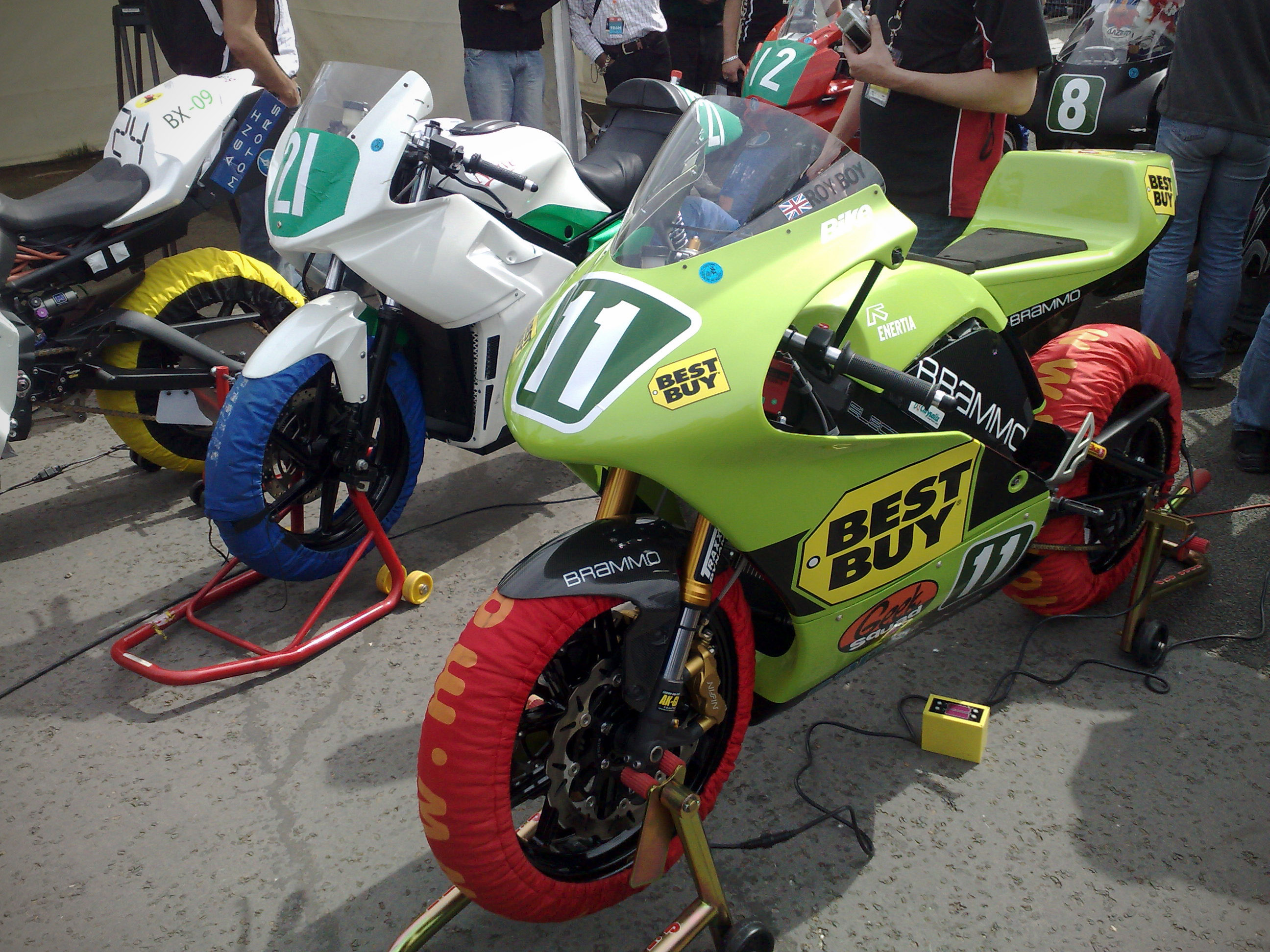
TTXGP bikes in the paddock before their first practice session in the 2009 Isle of Man TT

The first race to be held on Senior Race day was TTXGP – (Time Trial Xtreme Grand Prix) for racing motorcycles "to be powered without the use of carbon based fuels and have zero toxic/noxious emissions." The race for mainly two types of battery powered electric motorcycles for 1 lap (37.733 miles) of the Snaefell Mountain Course and the fastest time in practice was set Rob Barber in 26 minutes and 41.39 seconds an average speed of 84.819 mph in the 3a PRO Class.

The inaugural lap of the "Electric TT" the race leader at the official timing point at Glen Helen on lap 1 was Rob Barber with a Team AGNI electric motorcycle and described by the sports editor of an Isle of Man Newspaper as;- "For all the world it sounded like a milk float without the chink of glass bottles....the UK-India alliance AGNI team machine, ridden by the fastest man in training Rob Barber, whirred its way to Glen Helen in six minutes, the kind of time perhaps expected from Artie Bell on his winning ride in the 1950 Junior." In second place at Glen Helen was Thomas Schoenfelder and the XXL machine and 28 seconds down on the leaders time with James McBride and the Isle of Man-based ManTTx Racing in the Open Class a further 9 seconds behind. A change in the leaderboard positions at Ballaugh Bridge as Rob Barber was now leading James McBride by 46 seconds and the XXL entry of Thomas Schoenfelder relegated to third position. The Kingston University entry ridden by George Spence was forced to stop at Crosby Crossroads to recharge the batteries at the Crosby Hotel. The official speed-trap on Sulby Straight recorded a speed of 106.50 mph for the XXL machine for Thomas Schoenfelder, a speed of 99 mph for James McBride in the Open class and 97.9 mph for the PRO Class AGNI bike of Rob Barber. The fast pace was too much for the Open Class entry of ManTTx Racing, and the bike stopped with an overheated electric motor at Glen Duff and a retirement for James McBride, a replacement for Dan Kneen after a crash at the Black Dub during the Supersport TT Race 2, which resulted in a broken ankle for the 2008 Manx Grand Prix winner. The leader in TTXGP reached Ramsey Hairpin in 15 minutes and 56 seconds an average speed of 87 mph and Rob Barber maintained a lead over Thomas Schoenfelder with the American rider Thomas Montano over 2 minutes off the pace of the leaders.

The winner of the 2009 TTXGP was the AGNI entry of Rob Barber in 25 minutes and 53.50 seconds an average race speed of 87.434 mph. After lapping at 112 mph in the Supersport TT race 2, Rob Barber was pleased to be the inaugural winner of the TTXGP and said; "It is the best experience of my life....The volt meter is running quite low as the battery started to run out in the final few miles, but I have the win and the record lap, which I wanted – Fantastic." The winning Anglo-Indian AGNI PRO class entry was based on a 600 cc Suzuki GSX frame and incorporating the Cedric Lynch designed axial gap brushed DC Lynch motor. The second place in the PRO class was the XXL entry of Thomas Schoenfelder in 29 minutes and 4.93 seconds an average race speed of 77.841 mph. The XXL machine was based on 650 cc Laverda using a 120 hp Siemens motor and an electric regulator from an Audi hybrid car. The third-place finisher was Mark Buckley with the Brammo/BIKE entry on the 3a PRO class in 30 minutes and 2.64 seconds at an average race speed of 75.350 mph. The Brammo entries based in Oregon, USA and Mark Buckley said that; " Every time I ride this bike it just gets better. It just like a GP 250." The Open class winner was Chris Heath with the Electric Motorsport entry in 34 minutes and 17.30 at an average race speed of 66.022 mph. In second place was Chris Petty at an average race speed of 62.219 mph and third place with the TORK entry was John Crellin at an average race speed of 60.475 mph. There was confusion at the end of the Open class as the winner Chris Heath was briefly excluded and then reinstated after the rider was unaware of a TTXGP regulation that competitors must sound the machines' electric horn if a yellow flag is displayed by a race marshal. After discussion with ACU stewards and the TTXGP organisers, Chris Heath was reinstated as winner of the Open class.

=== Isle of Man Senior TT Race ===
The Blue Riband event of TT Race week was the Senior TT race over 6 lap (226.38 miles) of the Snaefell Mountain Course held on Friday 12 June 2009. The pole time for the Senior TT race was set on Thursday evening practice by the Australian Cameron Donald in 17 minutes, 13.25 seconds an average speed of 131.457 mph riding a 1000 cc Suzuki motorcycle. A non-qualifier for the Senior TT was the official Norton Motorcycle Company and a single entry Wankel-engined 588 cc NRV motorcycle ridden during practice by Michael Dunlop.

After a 30 minutes delay due to a light rain shower, the leader of the 2009 Senior TT on lap 1 at the official timing point at Glen Helen was the 1000 cc Honda of John McGuinness by 2.42 seconds from Steve Plater and the 1000 cc Kawasaki of Conor Cummins down by 1.75 seconds on the two Honda teammates. The 1000 cc Honda of Ian Hutchinson was 3.8 seconds behind in 4th place, followed by the 1000 cc Suzuki of Bruce Anstey, the 1000 cc Honda of Gary Johnson and Guy Martin in seventh place. The Honda of McGuinness completed lap 1 in 17 minutes and 17.23 seconds an average speed of 130.953 mph from a standing race start to lead Steve Plater at the TT Grandstand by 3.68 seconds. An early retirement was the 1000 cc Kawasaki of Ryan Farquhar explaining that;- "There is no high-speed stability." The lead was extended by John McGuinness on lap 2 to 10 seconds at the Ramsey Hairpin and Steve Plater held a 5.8 second margin over Conor Cummins in third place. The second lap was completed by John McGuinness in 17 minutes and 12.30 seconds at an average speed of 131.578 mph and McGuinness was on course to complete his fifth straight Senior TT win. The New Zealander Bruce Anstey retired his Suzuki at the 33rd Milestone and Ian Lougher retired his 1000 cc Yamaha with handling problems. At Glen Helen on lap 3, the Honda of John McGuinness was leading his teammate by 18.5 seconds with Conor Cummins holding third place. On the same lap while exiting Parliament Square, Ramsey the chain on the 1000 cc Honda of John McGuinness snapped and he coasted to a halt at Cruickshanks Corner. This dramatically handed the lead to Steve Plater with an 11-second lead over Conor Cummins at Ramsey Hairpin on lap 3 with the 1000 cc Honda of Guy Martin moving into third place. At the end of lap 4, Conor Cummins posted his first 130 mph lap in 17 minutes and 23.02 seconds an average speed of 130.225 mph. Further drama in the pit-lane at the TT Grandstand at the end of lap 4 with Guy Martin in third place pulling-out of his pit the chain on his 1000 cc Honda also snapped forcing him into retirement. The 1000 cc Honda of Keith Amor was another retirement with a jammed rear-wheel spindle which would not allow the rear-tyre to be changed.

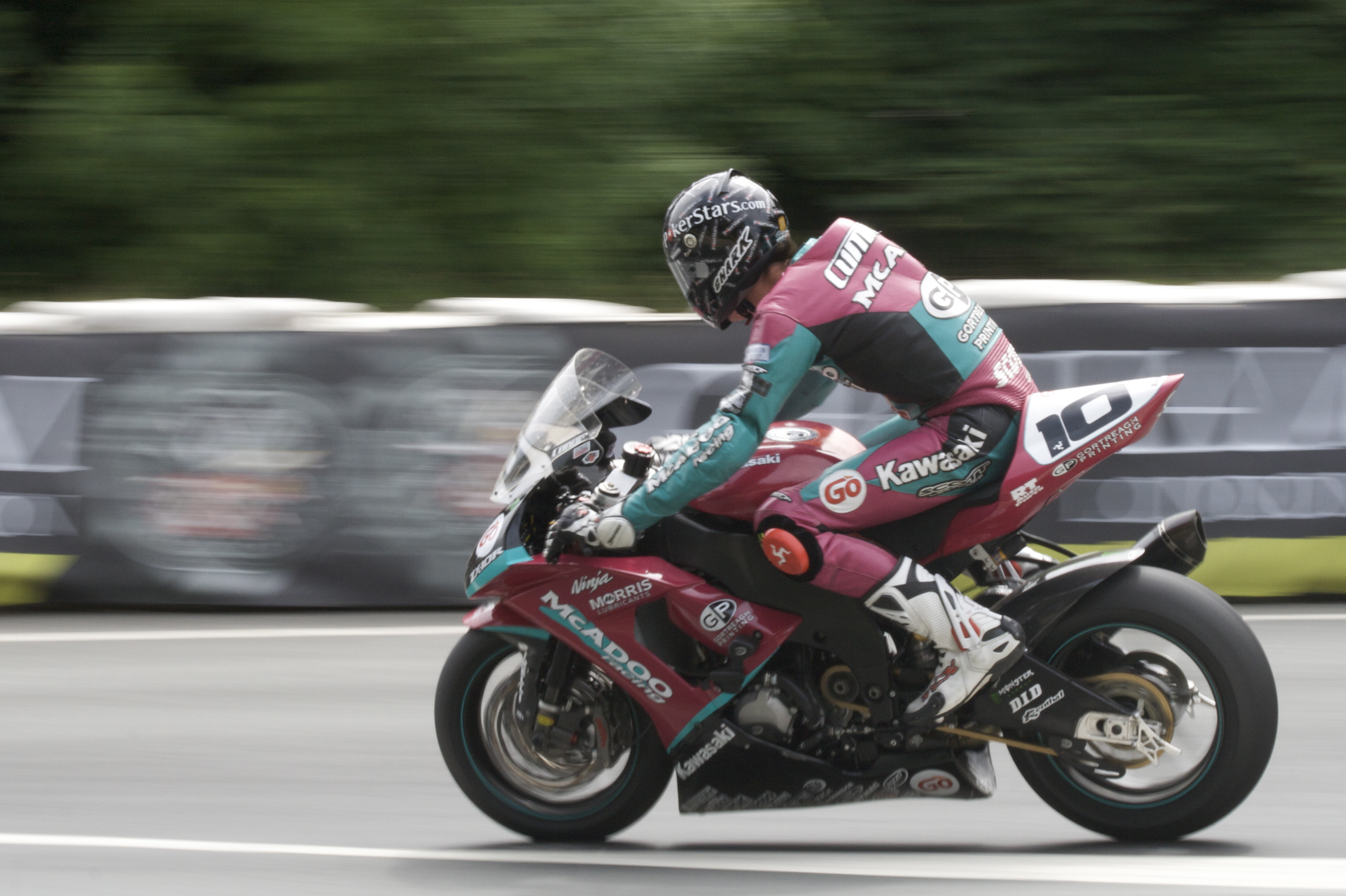
Conor Cummins on his way to second place during the Senior TT

The lead on lap 5 was extended by Steve Plater to 15.6 seconds at the Ramsey Hairpin over Conor Cummims with 29.2 seconds separated Ian Hutchinson in third place. A crash near the Alexander Road Junction with the Quarterbridge Road for the 1000 cc Suzuki of the American competitor Mark Miller and he slid downhill with his machine all the way to the Quarterbridge. This left oil on the racing line from the damaged motorcycle and despite the efforts of the race marshals the 1000 cc Yamaha of William Dunlop slid-off at the same place. This was followed by Ian Hutchinson crashing-out of third place of the Senior TT on the same oil at the Quarterbridge and also losing his lead in the Joey Dunlop TT Championship. This moved the 1000 cc Honda of Gary Johnson into third place on the last lap of the Senior TT Race. The winner of the 2009 Isle of Man TT Race was Steve Plater in 1 hour, 45 minutes and 53.15 seconds at an average race speed of 128.278 mph. Also winning the prestigious Isle of Man TT Championship, Steve Plater said that;- "This means a massive amount to me. It probably won't sink in until I manage to get some time to myself but I don't know were to go from here." In second place was the Isle of Man competitor Conor Cummins at an average race speed of 127.884 mph and was the best result for a local competitor in the Senior TT since Tom Sheard won the 1923 race. Describing the race, Conor Cummins said that; "I rode with all my heart today....I remember watching the TT as a lad from the end of the road near Milntown, but I never in a million years did I think I would get two podium finishes in one week." The third-place finisher was Gary Johnson at an average race speed of 126.875 mph and included a 10-second stop-box penalty at the pit stop at the end of lap 2. Delighted with his first podium place Gary Johnson said; "It has been a difficult week for us, but the team pulled together to enable me to pull this result out of the bag. I have served my three-year apprenticeship. The TT is an endurance race and you've got to be on it on the last lap to get a result." It is later announced by race organisers that John Crellin fatally crashed at the 27th Milestone on the Mountain Mile on lap 5 of the 2009 Senior TT Race. A local Isle of Man motorcycle competitor and experienced mountaineer, John Crellin had finished in third place in the Open Class for the 2009 TTXGP earlier in the same day. The newly formed manufacturers award was won by Honda. Fittingly in their 50th Racing year.

== Results ==
=== Practice Times ===
==== Practice Times & Leaderboard Superbike/Senior TT ====
Plates; Black on White/Black on Yellow.

Rank	Rider	Mon 1 June	Tue 2 June	Wed 3 June	Thurs 4 June	Fri 5 June
1	(Australia) Cameron Donald; 1000 cc Suzuki	18' 16.16; 123.912 mph	18' 15.21; 124.020 mph	19' 31.12; 115.981 mph	17' 13.25; 131.457 mph	—— No Time
2	(England) John McGuinness; 1000 cc Honda	17' 40.60; 128.067 mph	17' 27.56; 129.661 mph	17' 23.46; 130.171 mph	17' 52.90; 126.599 mph	—— No Time
3	(New Zealand) Bruce Anstey; 1000 cc Suzuki	18' 29.06; 122.471 mph	17' 53.22; 126.561 mph	17' 42.12; 127.884 mph	17' 23.79; 130.129 mph	—— No Time
4	(England) Guy Martin; 1000 cc Honda	18' 02.89; 125.431 mph	17' 38.72; 128.294 mph	17' 31.56; 129.168 mph	17' 33.86; 128.886 mph	17' 32.83; 129.013 mph
5	(England) Ian Hutchinson; 1000 cc Honda	—— No Time	17' 47.24; 127.271 mph	17' 41.46; 127.963 mph	17' 32.71; 129.027 mph	17' 46.76; 127.328 mph
6	(England) Steve Plater; 1000 cc Honda	18' 14.54; 124.096 mph	—— No Time	17' 37.42; 128.453 mph	17' 33.08; 128.982 mph	—— No Time
7	(Isle of Man) Conor Cummins; 1000 cc Kawasaki	17' 56.57; 121.167 mph	—— No Time	18' 10.12; 124.599 mph	17' 38.40; 128.334 mph	17' 44.59; 127.588 mph
8	(England) Gary Johnson; 1000 cc Honda	18' 05.00; 125.187 mph	18' 09.82; 124.633 mph	18' 15.02; 124.042 mph	17' 45.04; 127.533 mph	17' 42.87; 127.794 mph
9	(Northern Ireland) Adrian Archibald; 1000 cc Suzuki	17' 51.68; 126.743 mph	17' 51.15; 126.806 mph	19' 04.43; 118.687 mph	17' 43.13; 127.762 mph	—— No Time
10	(Wales) Ian Lougher; 1000 cc Yamaha	18' 37.37; 121.561 mph	18' 09.20; 124.704 mph	17' 50.99; 126.825 mph	17' 44.25; 127.628 mph	18' 04.02; 125.301 mph
11	(Scotland) Keith Amor; 1000 cc Honda	18' 28.55; 122.528 mph	17' 58.65; 125.924 mph	17' 59.88; 125.781 mph	17' 44.48; 127.600 mph	17' 55.50; 126.293 mph
12	(Northern Ireland) Ryan Farquhar; 1000 cc Kawasaki	18' 11.52; 124.440 mph	18' 36.60; 121.644 mph	18' 19.47; 123.539 mph	17' 58.92; 125.893 mph	17' 51.75; 126.734 mph
13	(England) Carl Rennie; 1000 cc Honda	18' 30.86; 122.273 mph	—— No Time	18' 10.03; 124.609 mph	17' 55.85; 126.252 mph	17' 53.08; 126.578 mph
14	(Northern Ireland) Michael Dunlop; 1000 cc Yamaha	—— No Time	—— No Time	18' 33.73; 121.958 mph	18' 22.81; 123.165 mph	18' 00.16; 125.749 mph
15	(England) Michael Rutter; 1000 cc Suzuki	—— No Time	18' 13.25; 124.243 mph	18' 06.24; 125.044 mph	18' 02.20; 125.511 mph	—— No Time
16	(England) Dan Stewart; 1000 cc Honda	—— No Time	18' 00.57; 125.701 mph	18' 12.45; 124.333 mph	18' 04.63; 125.229 mph	18' 06.61; 125.002 mph
17	(United States) Mark Miller; 1000 cc Suzuki	18' 56.90; 119.743 mph	18' 53.13; 119.869 mph	18' 40.52; 121.219 mph	18' 14.00; 124.157 mph	—— No Time
18	(England) Mark Parrett; 1000 cc Yamaha	18' 45.30; 120.704 mph	18' 42.14; 121.040 mph	18' 30.84; 122.275 mph	18' 15.96; 123.935 mph	—— No Time
19	(Northern Ireland) John Burrows; 1000 cc Suzuki	—— No Time	18' 27.93; 122.596 mph	18' 22.11; 123.244 mph	18' 19.37; 123.551 mph	18' 16.78; 123.843 mph
20	(England) Ian Mackman; 1000 cc Suzuki	18' 45.59; 120.673 mph	18' 27.72; 122.619 mph	18' 15.21; 120.074 mph	18' 18.24; 123.678 mph	18' 33.40; 121.994 mph

==== Practice Times & Leaderboard Supersport Junior TT ====
For 600 cc motorcycles conforming to the 2009 MCRCB Supersport Regulations.
Plate Colour; White on Blue.

Rank	Rider	Mon 1 June	Tue 2 June	Wed 3 June	Thurs 4 June	Fri 5 June
1	(Northern Ireland) Michael Dunlop; 600 cc Yamaha	18' 31.90; 122.158 mph	19' 43.32; 114.785 mph	18' 05.88; 125.085 mph	17' 55.45; 126.299 mph	18' 21.21; 123.345 mph
2	(Scotland) Keith Amor; 600 cc Honda	—— No Time	—— No Time	18' 39.49; 121.331 mph	18' 13.42; 124.233 mph	18' 37.98; 121.494 mph
3	(England) John McGuinness; 600 cc Honda	—— No Time	18' 23.33; 123.107 mph	18' 41.36; 121.128 mph	18' 16.56; 123.876 mph	18' 38.59; 121.428 mph
4	(New Zealand) Bruce Anstey; 600 cc Suzuki	—— No Time	18' 36.6; 121.660 mph	—— No Time	18' 16.49; 123.875 mph	—— No Time
5	(England) Steve Plater; 600 cc Honda	18' 38.67; 121.419 mph	18' 42.62; 120.992 mph	—— No Time	18' 20.74; 123.397 mph	18' 22.84; 123.162 mph
6	(England) Ian Hutchinson; 600 cc Honda	18' 28.887; 122.631 mph	—— No Time	18' 24.51; 122.976 mph	18' 05.84; 121.182 mph	18' 38.95; 121.389 mph
7	(Northern Ireland) Ryan Farquhar; 600 cc Kawasaki	18' 29.41; 122.433 mph	—— No Time	—— No Time	19' 35.54; 115.545 mph	19' 16.12; 117.486 mph
8	(Australia) Cameron Donald; 600 cc Suzuki	18' 34.04; 121.924 mph	—— No Time	25' 08.55; 90.039 mph	—— No Time	—— No Time
9	(Wales) Ian Lougher; 600 cc Yamaha	—— No Time	18' 41.27; 121.138 mph	18' 50.61; 120.137 mph	18' 33.06; 122.031 mph	18' 39.46; 121.334 mph
10	(Sweden) Mats Nilsson; 600 cc Yamaha	18' 42.02; 121.057 mph	18' 39.06; 121.377 mph	18' 35.02; 121.817 mph	—— No Time	—— No Time
11	(Isle of Man) Dan Kneen; 600 cc Yamaha	19' 17.56; 117.340 mph	18' 49.50; 120.555 mph	19' 02.30; 118.908 mph	18' 39.94; 121.281 mph	19' 17.11; 117.386 mph
12	(Northern Ireland) William Dunlop; 600 cc Yamaha	19' 25.83; 116.507 mph	—— No Time	18' 51.76; 120.015 mph	18' 42.30; 121.27 mph	18' 46.12; 120.616 mph
13	(England) Gary Johnson; 600 cc Honda	18' 51.02; 120.093 mph	—— No Time	18' 44.70; 120.768 mph	—— No Time	—— No Time
14	(England) Ian Mackman; 600 cc Suzuki	—— No Time	19' 03.09; 118.826 mph	18' 59.92; 119.166 mph	18' 49.43; 120.263 mph	—— No Time
15	(England) Dan Stewart; 600 cc Kawasaki	19' 19.04; 117.190 mph	19' 04.57; 118.672 mph	19' 52.76; 113.877 mph	18' 49.78; 120.225 mph	18' 47.12; 120.509 mph
16	(United States) Jimmy Moore; 600 cc Yamaha	—— No Time	—— No Time	18' 50.76; 120.121 mph	20' 27.12; 110.689 mph	18' 39.07; 121.376 mph
17	(Republic of Ireland) Derek Brien; 600 cc Yamaha	—— No Time	18' 55.96; 119.572 mph	19' 02.26; 118.912 mph	18' 50.83; 120.113 mph	18' 42.47; 121.009 mph
18	(England) James Hillier; 600 cc Kawasaki	—— No Time	—— No Time	19' 57.12; 113.462 mph	18' 54.36; 119.740 mph	18' 56.96; 119.466 mph
19	(Isle of Man) Conor Cummins; 600 cc Kawasaki	19' 14.49; 117.652 mph	18' 54.78; 119.696 mph	19' 17.31; 117.366 mph	—— No Time	—— No Time
20	(Wales) Paul Owen; 600 cc Yamaha	19' 28.98; 116.194 mph	19' 13.66; 117.737 mph	19' 37.37; 115.365 mph	18' 54.71; 119.703 mph	19' 37.37; 115.365 mph

==== Practice Times and Leaderboard 600 cc Sidecar TT ====
Rank	Rider	Mon 1 June	Tue 2 June	Wed 3 June	Thurs 4 June
1	(Isle of Man) Nick Crowe/Mark Cox; 600 cc LCR Honda	22' 22.95; 101.142 mph	19' 39.43; 114.697 mph	19' 30.30; 116.063 mph	—— No Time
2	(Isle of Man) Dave Molyneux/Dan Sayle; 600 cc DMR Suzuki	19' 44.23; 114.697 mph	19' 50.62; 114.082 mph	—— No Time	—— No Time
3	(England) Philip Dongworth/Gary Partridge; 600 cc Ireson Honda	20' 08.43; 112.400 mph	20' 26.00; 110.789 mph	20' 27.12; 110.689 mph	—— No Time
4	(England) John Holden/Andrew Winkle; 600 cc LCR Suzuki	20' 49.38; 108.716 mph	20' 18.47; 111.474 mph	20' 09.04; 112.344 mph	—— No Time
5	(Austria) Klaus Klaffenböck/Darren Hope; 600 cc LCR Honda	20' 35.44; 109.943 mph	20' 10.13; 112.242 mph	21' 00.08; 107.793 mph	—— No Time
6	(England) Tim Reeves/Patrick Farrance; 600 cc LCR	20' 59.79; 107.649 mph	52' 38.38; 43.006 mph	20' 20.71; 111.270 mph	—— No Time
7	(England) Simon Neary/Stuart Bond; 600 cc Suzuki	21' 01.77; 107.649 mph	20' 53.30; 108.376 mph	20' 31.63; 110.284 mph	—— No Time
8	(England) Bill Currie/Robert Biggs; 600 cc LCR Yamaha	22' 14.94; 101.748 mph	21' 54.84; 103.304 mph	20' 39.34; 104.488 mph	—— No Time
9	(England) Conrad Harrison/Kerry Williams; 600 cc Honda	20' 56.06; 108.138 mph	—— No Time	20' 41.08; 109.443 mph	—— No Time
10	(England); 600 cc Yamaha	21' 37.27; 104.703 mph	20' 47.87; 108.848 mph	20' 49.11; 108.740 mph	—— No Time
11	(England) Greg Lambert/Dipash Chauhan; 600 cc Honda	20' 51.73; 108.512 mph	20' 55.10; 108.221 mph	21' 23.90; 105.794 mph	—— No Time
12	(England) Roy Hanks/Dave Wells; 600 cc Suzuki	21' 19.25; 106.178 mph	20' 59.48; 107.844 mph	20' 58.33; 107.943 mph	—— No Time
13	(Isle of Man) Neil Kelly/Jason O'Connor; 600 cc Ireson Honda	21' 27.07; 105.532 mph	21' 16.45; 106.410 mph	21' 13.23; 106.680 mph	—— No Time
14	(England) Tony Baker/Fiona Baker-Milligan; 600 cc Baker Suzuki	—— No Time	21' 19.81; 106.131 mph	21' 32.50; 105.089 mph	—— No Time
15	(England) Ben Birchall/Tom Birchall; 600 cc LCR Honda	21' 47.05; 103.919 mph	21' 21.12; 106.023 mph	21' 24.12; 1105.751 mph	—— No Time
16	(England) Tony Thirkell/Nigel Barlow; 600 cc Honda	22' 02.71; 102,689 mph	21' 47.39; 103.892 mph	21' 52.06; 103.522 mph	—— No Time
17	(Isle of Man) Karl Bennett/Lee Cain; 600 cc DMR Honda	52' 42.45; 42.951 mph	21' 47.39; 103.892 mph	—— No Time	—— No Time
18	(Isle of Man) Brian Kelly/Dicky Gale; 600 cc DMR Honda	21' 48.24; 103.825 mph	21' 53.97; 103.372 mph	23' 43.84; 95.396 mph	—— No Time
19	(England) Andy Laidlow/James Neave; 600 cc LCR Suzuki	22' 09.32; 102.178 mph	21' 57.25; 103.115 mph	30' 19.44; 74.654 mph	—— No Time
20	(Scotland) Gordon Shand/Stuart Graham; 600 cc LCR	22' 22.13; 101.203 mph	21' 55.05; 103.287 mph	21' 58.01; 103.056 mph	—— No Time

==== Practice Times TTXGP ====
For Carbon free emission motorcycles in classes 3a-3d and Open class.

Rank	Rider	Tues 9 June
1	(England) Rob Barber; AGNI	26' 41.39; 84.819 mph
2	(Isle of Man) Dan Kneen; ManTTx Racing	32' 1.81; 70.677 mph
3	(England) Chris Petty; Barefoot Motors Racing	33' 35.09; 67.405 mph
4	(United States) Thomas Montano; Mission Motors	33' 45.98; 67.043 mph
5	(Germany) Thomas Schoenfelder; XXL	34' 07.44; 66.341 mph
6	(England) Roy Richardson; Brammo	35' 47.76; 63.242 mph
7	(Scotland) Mark Buckley; Brammo	35' 52.11; 63.114 mph
8	(England) Chris Heath; Electric Motorsport	40' 44.77; 55.559 mph
9	(Scotland) George Spence; Kingston University	40' 44.77; 55.559 mph
10	(New Zealand) Paul Dobbs; HTBLAUVA – TGM	41' 53.00; 54.050 mph

=== Race results ===
==== 2009 Superbike TT final standings. ====
8 June 2009 6 Laps (236.38 Miles) Mountain Course.

Rank	Rider	Team	Speed	Time
1	(England) John McGuinness	Honda 1000 cc	127.996 mph	1:46.07.16
2	(England) Steve Plater	Honda 1000 cc	127.632 mph	1:46.25.27
3	(England) Guy Martin	Honda 1000 cc	126.948 mph	1:46.59.69
4	(England) Ian Hutchinson	Honda 1000 cc	126.163 mph	1:47.39.66
5	(England) Gary Johnson	Honda 1000 cc	126.096 mph	1:47.43.08
6	(Northern Ireland) Adrian Archibald	Suzuki 1000 cc	124.532 mph	1:49.04.24
7	(Wales) Ian Lougher	Yamaha 1000 cc	124.506 mph	1:49.05.63
8	(England) Carl Rennie	Suzuki 1000 cc	122.835 mph	1:50.34.63
9	(England) Daniel Stewart	Honda 1000 cc	122.273 mph	1:51.05.13
10	(Northern Ireland) John Burrows	Suzuki 1000 cc	121.537 mph	1:51.45.54

Fastest Lap and New Class Record: John McGuinness – 130.442 mph (17' 21.29) on lap 2.

==== 2009 Sidecar TT Race 'A' TT final standings ====
8 June 2009 3 Laps (113.00 Miles) Mountain Course.

Rank	Rider	Team	Speed	Time
1	(Isle of Man) Dave Molyneux/Dan Sayle	600 cc DMR Suzuki	115.132 mph	58’ 59.28
2	(England) Philip Dongworth/Gary Partridge	600 cc Ireson Honda	113.404 mph	59’ 53.22
3	(England) Simon Neary/Stuart Bond	Suzuki 600 cc	111.096 mph	1:00.18.86
4	(England) Tim Reeves/Patrick Farrance	LCR Suzuki 600 cc	112.506 mph	1:00.21.88
5	(England) Conrad Harrison/Kerry Williams	Honda 600 cc	111.093 mph	1:01.07.95
6	(England) Steven Coombes/Paul Knapton	Ireson 600 cc	109.438 mph	1:02.03.44
7	(England) Roy Hanks/Dave Wells	DMR Suzuki 600 cc	108.328 mph	1:02.41.49
8	(Isle of Man) Neil Kelly/Jason O'Connor	Ireson Honda 600 cc	107.659 mph	1:03.04.97
9	(England) Tony Baker/Fiona Baker-Milligan	Suzuki 600 cc	107.173 mph	1:03.22.12
10	(England) Andy Laidlow/James Neave	LCR Suzuki 600 cc	105.528 mph	1:04.21.38

Fastest Lap: Dave Molyneux/Dan Sayle – 116.010 mph (19' 30.83) on lap 2.

==== 2009 Supersport Junior TT Race 1 ====
9 June 2009 4 Laps (150.73 Miles) Mountain Course.

Rank	Rider	Team	Speed	Time
1	(England) Ian Hutchinson	Honda 600 cc	124.141 mph	1:12.56.58
2	(England) Guy Martin	Honda 600 cc	123.948 mph	1:13.03.39
3	(Scotland) Keith Amor	Honda 600 cc	123.914 mph	1:13.04.58
4	(England) Steve Plater	Honda 600 cc	123.755 mph	1:13.10.22
5	(England) John McGuinness	Honda 600 cc	123.362 mph	1:13.24.20
6	(Northern Ireland) Ryan Farquhar	Kawasaki 600 cc	122.976 mph	1:13.38.02
7	(Wales) Ian Lougher	Yamaha 600 cc	122.140 mph	1:14.08.28
8	(England) Gary Johnson	Honda 600 cc	121.999 mph	1:14.13.41
9	(Northern Ireland) William Dunlop	Yamaha 600 cc	121.814 mph	1:14.20.18
10	(Isle of Man) Conor Cummins	Yamaha 600 cc	121.520 mph	1:14.30.96

Fastest Lap and New Lap Record: Bruce Anstey – 126.549 mph (17' 53.32) on lap 2.

==== 2009 Superstock TT final standings. ====
9 June 2009 4 Laps (150.73 Miles) Mountain Course.

Rank	Rider	Team	Speed	Time
1	(England) Ian Hutchinson	Honda 1000 cc	127.612 mph	1:10.57.54
2	(England) Guy Martin	Honda 1000 cc	127.349 mph	1:11.06.31
3	(Scotland) Keith Amor	Honda 1000 cc	127.103 mph	1:11.14.57
4	(England) Steve Plater	Honda 1000 cc	126.371 mph	1:11.39.34
5	(England) John McGuinness	Honda 1000 cc	125.854 mph	1:11.57.00
6	(Isle of Man) Conor Cummins	Kawasaki 1000 cc	125.846 mph	1:11.57.28
7	(England) Gary Johnson	Honda 1000 cc	125.533 mph	1:12.08.05
8	(England) Carl Rennie	Suzuki 1000 cc	124.665 mph	1:12.38.17
9	(England) Daniel Stewart	Yamaha 1000 cc	123.751 mph	1:13.10.37
10	(Isle of Man) Dan Kneen	Suzuki 1000 cc	123.071 mph	1:13.34.62

Fastest Lap and New Lap Record: Ian Hutchinson – 129.746 mph (17' 26.88) on lap 4.

==== 2009 Supersport Junior TT Race 2 ====
10 June 2009 4 Laps (150.73 Miles) Mountain Course.

Rank	Rider	Team	Speed	Time
1	(Northern Ireland) Michael Dunlop	Yamaha 600 cc	121.416 mph	1:14.34.80
2	(New Zealand) Bruce Anstey	Suzuki 600 cc	120.580 mph	1:15.05.81
3	(Isle of Man) Conor Cummins	Kawasaki 600 cc	120.561 mph	1:15.06.52
4	(England) Steve Plater	Honda 600 cc	120.436 mph	1:15.11.20
5	(England) Ian Hutchinson	Honda 600 cc	119.392 mph	1:15.50.67
6	(Wales) Ian Lougher	Yamaha 600 cc	119.186 mph	1:15.58.53
7	(Northern Ireland) Ryan Farquhar	Kawasaki 600 cc	117.557 mph	1:17.01.68
8	(Scotland) Mark Buckley	Yamaha 600 cc	117.213 mph	1:17.15.27
9	(England) Carl Rennie	Suzuki 600 cc	116.389 mph	1:17.48.06
10	(England) Gary Johnson	Honda 600 cc	116.350 mph	1:17.49.65

Fastest Lap: Steve Plater – 125.384 mph (18' 03.30) on lap 4.

==== 2009 TTXGP PRO Classes final standings. ====
12 June 2009 1 Lap (37.733 Miles) Mountain Course. TTXGP for Carbon free emission motorcycles in PRO classes 3a-3d

Rank	Rider	Team	Speed	Time
1	(England) Rob Barber	AGNI	87.434 mph	25' 53.50
2	(Germany) Thomas Schoenfelder	XXL	75.350 mph	29' 04.93
3	(Scotland) Mark Buckley	Brammo	75.350 mph	30' 02.64
4	(United States) Thomas Montano	Mission Motors	62.575 mph	36' 10.63
5	(New Zealand) Paul Dobbs	HTBLAUVA – TGM	62.575 mph	36' 10.63
6	(England) Stephen Harper	Brunel X-team	40.092 mph	56' 27.89

==== 2009 TTXGP OPEN Class final standings. ====
12 June 2009 1 Lap (37.733 Miles) Mountain Course. TTXGP for Carbon free emission motorcycles in OPEN class.

Rank	Rider	Team	Speed	Time
1	(England) Chris Heath	Electric Motorsport	66.022 mph	34' 17.30
2	(England) Chris Petty	Barefoot Motors	62.219 mph	36' 23.06
3	(Isle of Man) John Crellin	TORK	60.475 mph	37' 26.01

==== 2009 Senior TT final standings. ====
12 June 2009 6 Laps (236.38 Miles) Mountain Course.

Rank	Rider	Team	Speed	Time
1	(England) Steve Plater	Honda 1000 cc	128.278 mph	1:45.53.15
2	(Isle of Man) Conor Cummins	Kawasaki 1000 cc	127.884 mph	1:46.12.69
3	(England) Gary Johnson	Honda 1000 cc	126.875 mph	1:47.03.37
4	(Northern Ireland) Adrian Archibald	Suzuki 1000 cc	124.371 mph	1:49.12.72
5	(England) Carl Rennie	Suzuki 1000 cc	123.990 mph	1:49.32.85
6	(England) Daniel Stewart	Honda 1000 cc	123.048 mph	1:50.23.19
7	(England) Michael Rutter	Suzuki 1000 cc	122.864 mph	1:50.33.08
8	(Northern Ireland) John Burrows	Suzuki 1000 cc	121.841 mph	1:51.28.77
9	(England) James Hillier	Kawasaki 1000 cc	121.883 mph	1:51.29.24
10	(England) Ian Mackman	Suzuki 1000 cc	121.289 mph	1:51.59.20

Fastest Lap, New Lap and Course Record: John McGuinness – 131.578 mph (17' 12.30) on lap 2.

Note: Experienced rider John Crellin died after crashing on the fifth lap of this race.

==== 2009 Ultra-Lightweight TT Race 1 final standings. ====
13 June 2009 Race 1; 1st leg 8 Laps (34.00 Miles) Billown Circuit.

Rank	Rider	Team	Time	Speed
1	(Wales) Ian Lougher	Honda 125 cc	21' 29.625	94.911 mph
2	(England) Roy Richardson	Honda 125 cc	+ 14.919	93.826 mph
3	(Northern Ireland) William Dunlop	Honda 125 cc	+ 43.891	91.787 mph
4	(England) James Ford	Honda 125 cc	+ 49.593	91.397 mph
5	(Northern Ireland) Nigel Moore	Honda 125 cc	+ 51.401	91.273 mph
6	(England) Jon Vincent	Honda 125 cc	+ 51.401	89.986 mph
7	(England) Peter Wakefield	Honda 125 cc	+ 1' 13.366	89.803 mph
8	(England) Tom Snow	Honda 125 cc	+ 1' 22.252	89.211 mph
9	(England) Chris McGahan	Honda 125 cc	+ 1' 22.333	89.216 mph
10	(England) Kiaran Hanklin	Honda 125 cc	+ 1' 24.898	88.049 mph

Fastest Lap and New Lap Record: Ian Lougher – 94.911 mph (2' 39.291) on lap 7.

==== 2009 Lightweight TT Race 1 final standings. ====
13 June 2009 Race 2; 1st leg 8 Laps (34.00 Miles) Billown Circuit.

Rank	Rider	Team	Time	Speed
1	(Wales) Ian Lougher	Honda 250 cc	20' 09.870	101.168 mph
2	(Northern Ireland) Michael Dunlop	Honda 250 cc	+ 17.963	99.688 mph
3	(Northern Ireland) Barry Davidson	Honda 250 cc	+ 39.528	97.967 mph
4	(Northern Ireland) Andrew Neill	Honda 250 cc	+ 39.621	97.960 mph
5	(England) Phil Harvey	Honda 250 cc	+ 58.935	96.469 mph
6	(Northern Ireland) Nigel Moore	Honda 250 cc	+ 59.504	96.425 mph
7	(England) Paul Shoesmith	Honda 250 cc	+ 1' 9.425	95.678 mph
8	(Wales) Paul Owen	Honda 250 cc	+ 1' 16.328	95.164 mph
9	(Germany) Henrik Voit	Aprilia 250 cc	+ 1' 28.274	94.288 mph
10	(England) Tom Snow	Honda 250 cc	+ 1' 29.427	94.205 mph

Fastest Lap and New Lap Record: Chris Palmer, 102.638 mph (2' 29.068) on lap 5

==== 2009 Billown TT 600 cc/1000 Support Race final standings. ====
13 June 2009 Race 3; 8 Laps (34.00 Miles) Billown Circuit.

Rank	Rider	Team	Time	Speed
1	(Northern Ireland) John Burrows	Suzuki 1000 cc	19' 23.393	105.210 mph
2	(England) Mark Parrett	Yamaha 1000 cc	+ 0.295	105.183 mph
3	(Isle of Man) Steven Oates	Suzuki 750 cc	+ 22.733	103.190 mph
4	(England) Roy Richardson	Yamaha 600 cc	+ 23.94	103.088 mph
5	(New Zealand) Paul Dobbs	Yamaha 1000 cc	+ 24.422	103.046 mph
6	(Northern Ireland) Paul Cranston	Honda 1000 cc	+ 39.784	101.731 mph
7	(Scotland) Mark Buckley	Yamaha 600 cc	+ 40.004	101.712 mph
8	(Isle of Man) Simon Fulton	Yamaha 600 cc	+ 56.174	100.363 mph
9	(Isle of Man) Dave Madsen-Mygdal	Yamaha 600 cc	+ 56.351	100.349 mph
10	(England) Michael Goodings	Honda 1000 cc	+ 1' 21.127	98.351 mph

Fastest Lap: Mark Parrett, 106.125 mph (2' 26.125) on lap 6

==== 2009 Ultra-Lightweight TT Race 2 final standings. ====
13 June 2009 Race 4; 2nd leg 8 Laps (34.00 Miles) Billown Circuit.

Rank	Rider	Team	Time	Speed
2	(England) Chris Palmer	Honda 125 cc	21' 48.035	93.575 mph
2	(Wales) Ian Lougher	Honda 125 cc	+ 3.213	93.346 mph
3	(England) Roy Richardson	Honda 125 cc	+ 3.361	93.336 mph
4	(Northern Ireland) William Dunlop	Honda 125 cc	+ 37.807	90.947 mph
5	(England) Phil Harvey	Honda 125 cc	+ 1' 03.546	89.240 mph
6	(England) Jon Vincent	Honda 125 cc	+ 1' 03.930	89.215 mph
7	(England) Peter Wakefield	Honda 125 cc	+ 1' 04.178	89.199 mph
8	(England) Tom Snow	Honda 125 cc	+ 1' 04.178	89.194 mph
9	(England) Chris McGahan	Honda 125 cc	+ 1' 04.727	89.163 mph
10	(Northern Ireland) Andrew Neill	Honda 125 cc	+ 1' 05.325	89.124 mph

Fastest Lap;- Chris Palmer – 95.291 mph (2' 40.561) on lap 2.

==== 2009 Lightweight TT Race 2 final standings. ====
13 June 2009 Race 5; 2nd leg 8 Laps (34.00 Miles) Billown Circuit.

Rank	Rider	Team	Time	Speed
1	(Wales) Ian Lougher	Honda 250 cc	20' 20.665	100.273 mph
2	(Northern Ireland) Michael Dunlop	Honda 250 cc	+ 6.514	99.741 mph
3	(Northern Ireland) Barry Davidson	Honda 250 cc	+ 37.700	97.269 mph
4	(Northern Ireland) Andrew Neill	Honda 250 cc	+ 39.797	97.170 mph
5	(England) Phil Harvey	Honda 250 cc	+ 46.376	96.603 mph
6	(Wales) Paul Owen	Honda 250 cc	+ 46.682	96.580 mph
7	(Germany) Henrik Voit	Aprilia 250 cc	+ 1' 09.381	94.880 mph
8	(Wales) Kevin Strowger	Honda 250 cc	+ 1' 24.969	93.748 mph
9	(England) Tom Snow	Honda 250 cc	+ 1' 34.257	93.085 mph
10	(England) Neil Chadwick	Yamaha 250 cc	+ 1' 53.665	91.731 mph

Fastest Lap;- William Dunlop, 102.077 mph (2' 29.887) on lap 6

==== 2009 Billown TT 125 cc Ultra-Lightweight TT Solo Points Table ====
Pos	Rider	Leg 1	Leg 2	Pts
1	(Wales) Ian Lougher	25	20	45
2	(England) Roy Richardson	20	16	36
3	(Northern Ireland) William Dunlop	16	13	29
4	(England) Chris Palmer		25	25
5	(England) Jon Vincent	10	10	20
6	(England) Peter Wakefield	9	9	18
7	(England) Tom Snow	8	8	16
8	(England) Chris McGahan	7	7	14
9	(England) James Ford	4		4
10	(Northern Ireland) Adrian Neill	5	6	11
11	(England) Kiaran Hankin	6	5	11
12	(Northern Ireland) Nigel Moore	11		11
13	(England) Phil Harvey		11	11
14	(Austria) Martin Loicht	3	3	6
15	(England) Doug Snow	4	1	5
16	(Isle of Man) Dave Moffit		4	4
17	(France) Laurent Guignat	1	2	3
18	(Northern Ireland) Darren Gilpin	2		2
Pos	Rider	Leg 1	Leg 2	Pts

==== 2009 Billown TT 250 cc Lightweight TT Solo Points Table ====
Pos	Rider	Leg 1	Leg 2	Pts
1	(Wales) Ian Lougher	25	25	45
2	(Northern Ireland) Michael Dunlop	20	20	36
3	(Northern Ireland) Barry Davidson	16	16	32
4	(Northern Ireland) Andrew Neill	13	13	26
5	(England) Phil Harvey	11	11	22
6	(Wales) Paul Owen	8	10	18
7	(Germany) Henrik Voight	7	9	16
8	(England) Kevin Stowger	5	8	13
9	(England) Tow Snow	6	7	13
10	(Northern Ireland) Nigel Moore	10		10
11	(England) Paul Shoesmith	9		9
12	(England) Neil Chadwick	3	6	9
13	(England) Peter Wakefield	4	5	9
14	(Isle of Man) Dean Martin	2	4	6
15	(England) Carl Savage	1	3	4
16	(England) Mike Hose		2	2
17	(England) Neil Cudworth		2	2
Pos	Rider	Leg 1	Leg 2	Pts

=== Isle of Man TT Championship Points Standings ===
Introduced in 2009, the 2009 Isle of Man TT points championship will award points to the best 15 riders in each of the five solo races. The winner of this championship will win the Joey Dunlop TT Champion Trophy and a prize of £10,000.

Pos	Rider	Superbike	Supersport 1	Superstock	Supersport 2	Senior	Pts
1	(England) Steve Plater	20	13	13	13	25	84
2	(England) Ian Hutchinson	13	25	25	11		74
3	(England) Guy Martin	16	20	20			56
4	(England) John McGuinness	25	11	11	5		52
5	(Isle of Man) Conor Cummins		6	10	16	20	52
6	(England) Gary Johnson	11	8	9	6	16	50
7	(England) Carl Rennie	8		8	7	11	34
8	(Scotland) Keith Amor		16	16			32
9	(Wales) Ian Lougher	9	9	3	10		31
10	(Northern Ireland) Michael Dunlop				25		25
11	(Northern Ireland) Adrian Archibald	10	1			13	24
12	(England) Daniel Stewart	7		7		10	24
13	(New Zealand) Bruce Anstey				20		20
14	(Northern Ireland) Ryan Farquhar		10		9		19
15	(Northern Ireland) William Dunlop	4	7	5			16
16	(Northern Ireland) John Burrows	6				8	14
17	(Isle of Man) Dan Kneen	3	5	6			14
18	(England) Michael Rutter				3	9	12
19	(England) James Hillier			2		7	9
20	(United States) Mark Miller	5		4			9
21	(Scotland) Mark Buckley				8		8
22	(England) Ian Mackman	2				6	8
23	(England) Roy Richardson		3		4		7
24	(England) Mark Parrett					5	5
25	(Sweden) Mats Nilsson	1	4				5
26	(England) Rob Barber					4	4
27	(Wales) Paul Owen					3	3
28	(Isle of Man) Chris Palmer				2	1	3
29	(England) Ian Pattinson			1		2	3
30	(United States) Jimmy Moore		2				2
31	(Republic of Ireland) Derek Brien				1		1
Pos	Rider	Superbike	Supersport 1	Superstock	Supersport 2	Senior	Pts

== Bibliography ==
- "Island Racer 2009: Isle of Man TT Special". Island Racer. Mortons Media Group. 2009 – via Kelsey Publishing.
