= Glen Duff =

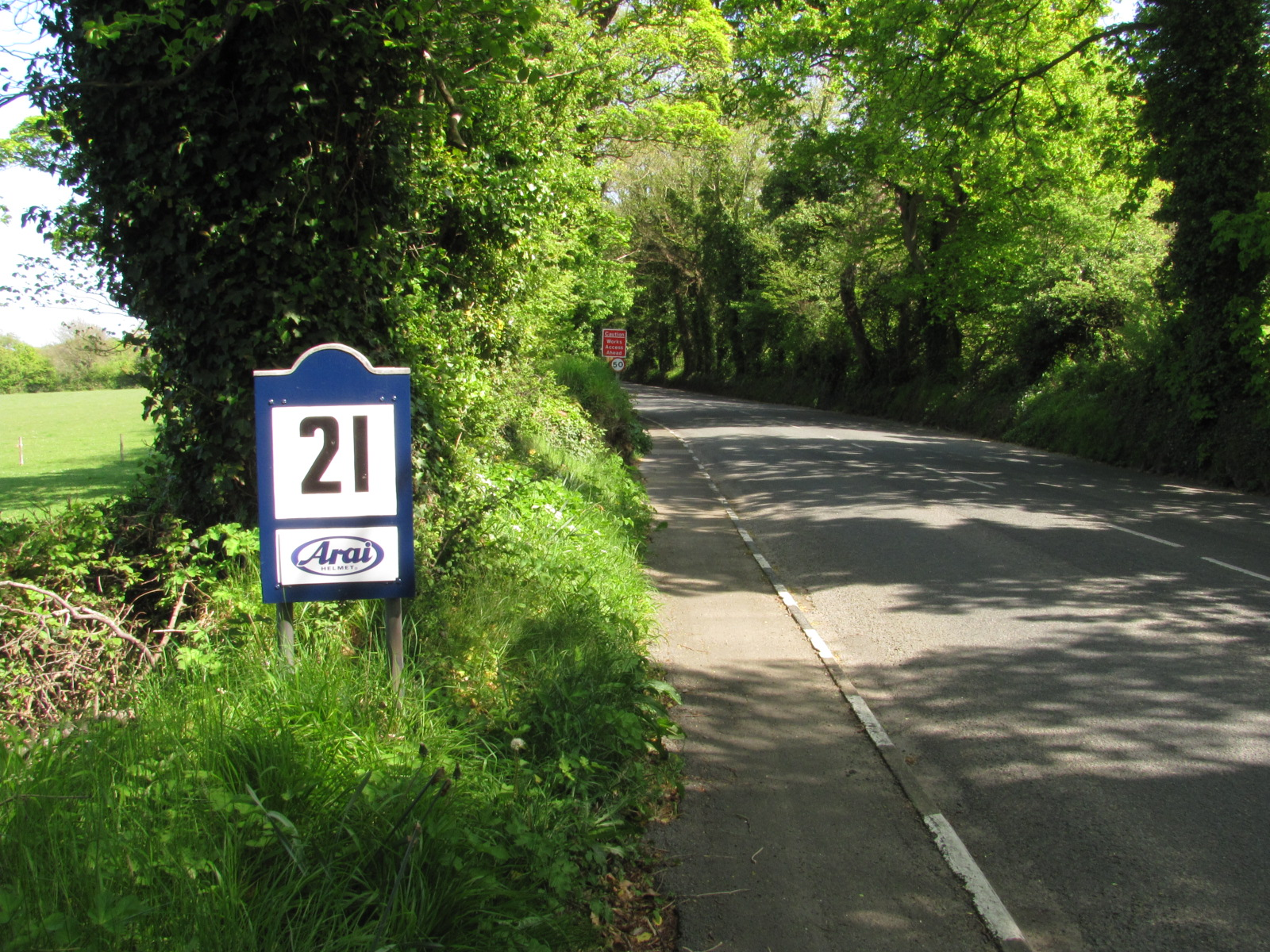
- A3 Castletown to Ramsey road, 21st TT Milestone at Glen Duff.

- Location within Isle of Man
- 54°19′22″N 4°26′50″W

Glen Duff (Manx: black glen) is situated adjacent to the 23rd road milestone on the A3 Castletown to Ramsey road with the junction with the B14 Bernaharra Road (Road of the Ayre) in the parish of Kirk Christ Lezayre in the Isle of Man.

== Description ==
The Engineering Work Section, Highways Division of the Isle of Man Department of Infrastructure has its northern depot at Glen Duff Quarry, including a domed storage barn built in 2003 known as the 'Igloo', for storage of road salt treatments during the winter. The previous Isle of Man Highway and Transport Board Glen Duff depot was damaged by fire in a works highway garage in 1953.

The Glen Duff Depot and Glen Duff old quarry (previously known as Manx: Gob-y-Vuinney) has been identified within the Ancient Woodland Inventory by the Manx Wildlife Trust. Within the 2.57 hectares (6.4 acres) site, the Trust observed hazel (Corylus avellana), oak (Quercus × rosacea) and silver birch (Betula pendula) trees along with wild strawberry (Fragaria vesca) within the depot and old quarry.

== Motor-Sport heritage ==
Glen Duff was part of the 37.50 Mile Four Inch Course for the RAC Tourist Trophy automobile races held in the Isle of Man between 1908 and 1922.

In 1911, the Four Inch Course for automobiles was first used by the Auto-Cycling Union for the Isle of Man TT motorcycle races. This included Glen Duff and Glentramman section and the course later became known as the 37.73 mile Isle of Man TT Mountain Course which has been used since 1911 for the Isle of Man TT Races and from 1923 for the Manx Grand Prix races.
