= 2007 Manx Grand Prix =

== Practice Monday 20 August – Saturday 26 August 2007 ==
=== Senior Manx Grand Prix Leaderboard and Practice Times ===
Rank	Rider	Mon 20 Aug	Tues 21 Aug	Wed 22 Aug	Fri 24 Aug	Sat 25 Aug	Mon 27 Aug
1	(Sweden) Mats Nilsson; 600 cc Honda	19' 54.98; 113.655 mph	19' 34.39; 115.658 mph	20' 14.74; 111.816 mph	19' 30.34; 116.058 mph	22' 40.07; 99.868 mph	19' 13.43; 117.760 mph
2	(England) Michael Weldon; 600 cc Yamaha	19' 58.15; 113.365 mph	19' 36.22; 115.478 mph	19' 28.29; 116.202 mph	20' 00.47; 113.146 mph	—— No Time	19' 21.55; 116.937 mph
3	(Republic of Ireland) Shane Connor; 600 cc Yamaha	—— No Time	—— No Time	19' 41.87; 114.926 mph	19' 28.39; 116.252 mph	22' 18.89; 101.448 mph	19' 28.42; 116.250 mph
4	(Wales) Adam Barclay; 750 cc Suzuki	20' 01.37; 113.061 mph	19' 33.63; 115.734 mph	20' 00.47; 113.146 mph	19' 40.41; 115.068 mph	19' 43.32; 114.785 mph	—— No Time
5	(Republic of Ireland) Derek Brien; 750 cc Suzuki	—— No Time	—— No Time	—— No Time	—— No Time	—— No Time	19' 40.74; 115.036 mph
6	(Northern Ireland) James McCullagh; 750 cc Suzuki	—— No Time	20' 45.76; 109.032 mph	19' 41.81; 114.448 mph	—— No Time	—— No Time	—— No Time
7	(Northern Ireland) Phil McGurk; 750 cc Suzuki	20' 52.23; 108.469 mph	19' 49.24; 114.214 mph	—— No Time	20' 43.71; 109.212 mph	—— No Time	—— No Time
8	(England) Andy Jackson; 750 cc Suzuki	20' 44.03; 109.184 mph	20' 05.64; 112.661 mph	19' 50.49; 114.094 mph	20' 08.28; 112.415 mph	22' 33.93; 99.879 mph	—— No Time
9	(Isle of Man) Simon Fulton; 600 cc Honda	20' 11.21; 112.143 mph	19' 58.68; 113.314 mph	19' 50.70; 114.074 mph	19' 48.44; 114.291 mph	20' 37.07; 114.720 mph	19' 49.81; 114.159 mph
10	(Republic of Ireland) Ryan McKay; 600 cc Honda	20' 52.23; 108.469 mph	19' 57.85; 113.393 mph	—— No Time	19' 53.04; 113.851 mph	23' 20.54; 96.983 mph	20' 15.22; 111.773 mph

== Race results ==
=== Newcomers Race A ===
Monday 27 August 2007 – Mountain Course 4 laps – 150.92 miles (242.80 km)

- Four-stroke Four-cylinder motorcycles exceeding 550 cc and not exceeding 750 cc.
- Twin/three-cylinder motorcycles exceeding 601 cc and not exceeding 1000 cc.

Rank	Rider	Team	Speed	Time
1	(Republic of Ireland) Andrew Brady	750 cc Suzuki	109.107 mph	1:22.59.61
2	(England) Russell Mountford	599 cc Yamaha	107.888 mph	1:20.22.88
3	(Isle of Man) Justin Croft	600 cc Yamaha	107.678 mph	1:24.05.72
4	(Northern Ireland) Noel Patterson	750 cc Suzuki	107.256 mph	1:24.25.55
5	(Northern Ireland) Paul Gartland	750 cc Suzuki	104.660 mph	1:26.31.20
6	(Spain) Sergio Romero	599 cc Honda	103.727 mph	1:27.17.88
7	(England) Ian Gilder	750 cc Suzuki	103.637 mph	1:27.22.47
8	(England) Michael Russell	600 cc Suzuki	103.455 mph	1:27.31.69
9	(Northern Ireland) James McCann	750 cc Suzuki	103.346 mph	1:27.37.22
10	(Northern Ireland) Adrian Louge	749 cc Suzuki	102.962 mph	1:27.56.85

- Fastest Lap No 6. Andrew Brady – 19 minutes 22.85 seconds 116.806 mph

=== Newcomers Race C ===
Monday 27 August 2007 – Mountain Course 4 laps – 150.92 miles (242.80 km)

- Two-stroke motorcycles exceeding 125 cc and 6 gears.
- Four-stroke motorcycles exceeding 251 cc and not exceeding 400 cc.

Rank	Rider	Team	Speed	Time
1	(England) Oliver Linsdell	398 cc Yamaha	102.830 mph	1:28.03.57
2	(Republic of Ireland) David Yeomans	400 cc Honda	89.059 mph	1:41.40.55
3	(England) Brian Clarke	400 cc Yamaha	88.853 mph	1:41.54.72
4	(Italy) Roberto Airoldi	399 cc Kawasaki	87.680 mph	1:43.16.52
5	(England) Brenden Stone	400 cc Kawasaki	87.909 mph	1:46.38.77
6	(England) Ian Griffiths	400 cc Honda	87.796 mph	1:46.47.30
7	(Wales) Jimmy Aspinall	399 cc Honda	82.437 mph	1:49.50.62

- Fastest Lap No 48 Oliver Linsdell – 21 minutes 25.12 seconds 105.693 mph

=== Senior Classic Race ===
Monday 27 August 2007 – Mountain Course 4 laps – 150.92 miles (242.80 km)

- For motorcycles exceeding 350 cc and not exceeding 500 cc.

Rank	Rider	Team	Speed	Time
1	(Northern Ireland) Ryan Farquhar	500 cc BIC Paton	107.576 mph	1:24.44.19
2	(England) Chris Palmer	500 cc Matchless	106.863 mph	1:24.44.19
3	(England) Steve Linsdell	500 cc BIC Paton	106.823 mph	1:24.46.10
4	(England) Mark Parrett	499 cc G50 Matchless	103.670 mph	1:27.20.81
5	(Isle of Man) Alan Brew	496 cc G50 Seeley	103.41.95 mph	1:27.41.95
6	(Scotland) Wattie Brown	500 cc Petty Manx	102.703 mph	1:28.10.12
7	(England) John Goodall	496 cc Matchless G50	102.188 mph	1:28.36.78
8	(Isle of Man) Dave Madsen-Mygdal	499 cc Honda	101.175 mph	1:29.30.05
9	(England) Steve Elliot	499 cc Honda	100.711 mph	1:29.54.74
10	(England) Bob Price	500 cc Seeley G50	99.938 mph	1:30.36.52

- Fastest Lap No 6. Ryan Farquhar – 20 minutes 52.47 seconds 108.448 mph

=== Junior Classic Race ===
Wednesday 29 August 2007 – Mountain Course 4 laps – 150.92 miles (242.80 km)

- Class A for motorcycles exceeding 300 cc and not exceeding 350 cc.

Rank	Rider	Team	Speed	Time
1	(England) Roy Richardson	349 cc Drixton Honda	101.545 mph	1:31.04.39
2	(Northern Ireland) Ryan Farquhar	349 cc K4 Honda	100.755 mph	1:29.52.41
3	(England) Chris McGahan	350 cc Honda	100.238 mph	1:30.20.24
4	(England) John Goodall	349 cc AJS 7R	98.191 mph	1:32.13.21
5	(England) Steve Elliot	349 cc Honda	97.573 mph	1:32.48.24
6	(England) Tony Myres	349 cc Manx Norton	96.776 mph	1:34.21.19
7	(Isle of Man) Rich Hawkins	349 cc Ducati	96.672 mph	1:33.40.14
8	(Isle of Man) Dave Madsen-Mygdal	349 cc Honda	94.891 mph	1:35.25.62
9	(England) Pete Swallow	348 cc Petty Manx	93.804 mph	1:36.32.01
10	(England) Andy Reynolds	348 cc Honda	93.563 mph	1:36.46.93

- Fastest Lap No 10. Roy Richardson – 22 minutes 01.37 seconds 102.794 mph

=== Lightweight Classic Race ===
Wednesday 29 August 2007 – Mountain Course 4 laps – 150.92 miles (242.80 km)

- Class B for motorcycles exceeding 175 cc and not exceeding 250 cc.

Rank	Rider	Team	Speed	Time
1	(Scotland) Ewan Hamilton	242 cc Suzuki	93.937 mph	1:36.23.79
2	(England) Peter Richardson	248 cc Suzuki	92.909 mph	1:37.27.77
3	(England) David Smith	246 cc Suzuki	92.613 mph	1:37.46.48
4	(England) Peter Symes	250 cc Suzuki	92.425 mph	1:37.58.38
5	(England) Tom Jackson	248 cc Suzuki	89.932 mph	1:40.41.34
6	(England) Mervyn Stratford	247 cc Greeves Silverstone	85.971 mph	1:45.19.70
7	(England) Roger Jones	248 cc Suzuki	85.523 mph	1:45.52.84
8	(England) Tony Mason	249 cc Honda	83.662 mph	1:45.52.84
9	(Republic of Ireland) Kevin Murphy	250 cc Ducati	79.320 mph	1:54.09.63

- Fastest Lap No 75. Ewan Hamilton – 23 minutes 37.47 seconds 95.825 mph

=== Junior Manx Grand Prix ===
Wednesday 29 August 2007 – Mountain Course 4 laps – 150.92 miles (242.80 km)

- Two-stroke motorcycles exceeding 200 cc and not exceeding 350 cc.
- Four-stroke four-cylinder motorcycles exceeding 450 cc and not exceeding 600 cc.
- Four-stroke twin-cylinder motorcycles exceeding 600 cc and not exceeding 750 cc.

Rank	Rider	Team	Speed	Time
1	(Republic of Ireland) Derek Brien	600 cc Kawasaki	118.027 mph	1:16.43.30
2	(Sweden) Matts Nilsson	600 cc Honda	116.361 mph	1:17.42.20
3	(Northern Ireland) Andrew Neill	600 cc Honda	115.441 mph	1:18.26.41
4	(England) Phil McGurk	600 cc Honda	114.824 mph	1:18.51.70
5	(Wales) Adam Barclay	600 cc Suzuki	114.602 mph	1:19.00.84
6	(Northern Ireland) James McCullaugh	600 cc Honda	114.076 mph	1:19.22.71
7	(Isle of Man) Simon Fulton	600 cc Honda	113.814 mph	1:19.33.69
8	(England) Michael Charnock	600 cc Honda	113.549 mph	1:19.46.50
9	(England) Neal Champion	600 cc Kawasaki	113.316 mph	1:19.54.66
10	(Republic of Ireland) Ryan McCay	600 cc Honda	113.160 mph	1:20.01.29

=== Lightweight Manx Grand Prix ===
Friday 31 August 2007 – Mountain Course 4 laps – 150.92 miles (242.80 km)

- Two-stroke motorcycles 201 cc – 350 cc

Rank	Rider	Team	Speed	Time
1	(Northern Ireland) Samuel Dunlop	250 cc Honda	108.083 mph	1:23.46.79
2	(England) Neil Kent	249 cc Yamaha	106.545 mph	1:23.59.35
3	(Northern Ireland) Brian Kent	250 cc Yamaha	105.955 mph	1:25.27.76
4	(Isle of Man) Wally Kneale	250 cc Honda	103.664 mph	1:27.21.09
5	(Wales) Daniel Williams	250 cc Honda	103.338 mph	1:27.37.62
6	(Isle of Man) Dean Martin	250 cc Honda	102.953 mph	1:27.57.28
7	(Isle of Man) Carl Roberts	250 cc Honda	102.639 mph	1:28.13.45
8	(England) Tom Snow	250 cc Honda	101.217 mph	1:29.27.77
9	(Northern Ireland) Robert McCrum	250 cc Honda	99.216 mph	1:31.16.03
10	(Northern Ireland) Mark Waddell	250 cc Honda	98.843 mph	1:31.36.74

- Fastest Lap No 7. Samuel Dunlop – 20 minutes 36.15 seconds 109.880 mph

=== Ultra-Lightweight Manx Grand Prix (Provisional Result) ===
Friday 31 August 2007 – Mountain Course 3 laps – 113.00 miles

- Two-stroke motorcycles up to 125 cc, 6 gears maximum.
- Four-stroke motorcycles 251 cc – 401 cc

Rank	Rider	Team	Speed	Time
1	(England) Oliver Linsdell	398 cc Yamaha	106.634 mph	1:03.41.33
2	(England) Tim Sayers	400 cc Kawasaki	104.630 mph	1:04.54.53
3	(Northern Ireland) Joe Phillips	398 cc Kawasaki	104.107 mph	1:05.14.10
4	(Republic of Ireland) Keith Costello	400 cc Honda	104.039 mph	1:05.16.65
5	(England) Andrew Kirkwood	399 cc Kawasaki	103.353 mph	1:05.42.63
6	(Isle of Man) Dan Sayle	125 cc Honda	101.769 mph	1:06.44.01
7	(England) Ross Johnson	400 cc Kawasaki	101.105 mph	1:07.10.31
8	(Wales) Anthony Davies	399 cc Yamaha	100.701 mph	1:07.26.47
9	(Republic of Ireland) Myles Byrne	400 cc Honda	100.423 mph	1:07.36.66
10	(England) Ian Hickey	400 cc Honda	99.643 mph	1:08.09.43

=== Ultra-Lightweight Manx Grand Prix (Revised Result) ===
Friday 31 August 2007 – Mountain Course 4 laps – 150.92 miles (242.80 km)

Rank	Rider	Team	Speed	Time
1	(England) Oliver Linsdell	398 cc Yamaha	107.197 mph	1:24.38.25
2	(England) Tim Sayers	400 cc Kawasaki	104.796 mph	1:26.24.29
3	(Republic of Ireland) Keith Costello	400 cc Honda	104.567 mph	1:26.35.85
4	(Northern Ireland) Joe Phillips	398 cc Kawasaki	104.537 mph	1:26.37.32
5	(England) Andrew Kirkwood	399 cc Kawasaki	103.441 mph	1:23.32.41
6	(Isle of Man) Dan Sayle	125 cc Honda	101.577 mph	1:29.08.76
7	(England) Ross Johnson	400 cc Kawasaki	101.333 mph	1:29.21.67
8	(Republic of Ireland) Myles Byrne	400 cc Honda	100.695 mph	1:29.55.90
9	(Wales) Anthony Davies	399 cc yamaha	100.482 mph	1:30.7.04
10	(England) Ian Hickey	400 cc Honda	99.691 mph	1:30.49.97

- Fastest Lap No 41. Oliver Linsdell – 20 minutes 47.03 seconds 108.922 mph.

== Notes ==
- After the cancellation of the first evening practice session on Saturday 18 August 2007 due to heavy rain and low-lying mist on the primary A18 Mountain Road section of the Snaefell mountain course The next Manx Grand Prix practice was held on the evening of Monday 20 August 2007 with the newcomers escorted on their first lap by travelling marshalls and former Isle of Man TT Race competitors. A number of competitors where caught-out at Governor's Bridge including newcomer Dave Yeomans and also John Harrison riding a 600 cc Honda and John Batty on a 400c Kawasaki. Former 1972 Manx Grand Prix Senior winner Dave Hughes injured an arm after a crash at Union Mills riding a 350 cc Manx Norton. At Cruickshank's Corner in Ramsey, Steve Gibbs slipped of his 350 cc Classic Honda and was uninjured.
- During Tuesday evening practice Brian Spooner set the fastest time in the Lightweight class with a lap at an average speed of 111.288 mph and then suffered a crash at Quarterbridge as did Neil Kent at Ballacraine and both were uninjured.
- Wednesday Evening practice is cut-short after problems with low-lying sea-mist and fog in the Kirk Michael area. Only two laps of practice are completed by the Senior, Junior and Lightweight competitors. An incident involving two riders occurred at the Waterworks Corner near Ramsey between Marie Hodson and Robert Gordon. Another incident occurred at Alpine Cottage with Kevin Fitzpatrick and Neil Cudworth taken to Nobles Hospital with suspected minor fractures.
- Again Thursday evening practice is cut-short by reduced visibility on the Mountain Section of the course and sea-mist in the Kirk Michael area.
