= Ballacobb =

Coordinates: 54°18′29″N 4°32′56″W

Ballacobb (in Manx: Ballacurn, the farm of McCurry or O'Curry) is situated between the 16th and 17th Milestone road-side markers on the Snaefell Mountain Course, on the primary A3 Castletown to Ramsey road at the side-junction with the tertiary U16 Slieu Curn Road, in the parish of Ballaugh in the Isle of Man.

The distinctive S-bend at Ballacobb and the nearby Ballaugh Bridge were part of the Highland Course and Four Inch Course used for the Gordon Bennett Trial and Tourist Trophy car races held between 1904 and 1922. Ballacobb is part of the Snaefell Mountain Course used since 1911 for the Isle of Man TT and from 1923 for the Manx Grand Prix races.
