= 2008 Manx Grand Prix =

The 2008 Manx Grand Prix was held between 18 and 30 August on the Mountain Course. The Senior event was won by the Welsh rider Adam Barclay, and the Junior and Ultra-Lightweight events by the Manx rider Dan Kneen, who also scored the fastest lap in three different races.

== Results ==
=== Practice times ===
==== 2008 Senior Manx Grand Prix Practice Times and Leaderboard ====
Rank	Rider	Mon 18 Aug	Tues 19 Aug	Wed 20 Aug	Thurs 21 Aug	Fri 22 Aug
1	(Northern Ireland) James McCullagh; 750 cc Suzuki	Cancelled; No Time	21' 03.68; 107.486 mph	20' 40.80; 109.468 mph	—— No Time	19' 06.76; 118.445 mph
2	(Wales) Adam Barclay; 750 cc Suzuki	Cancelled; No Time	19' 51.52; 114.014 mph	—— No Time	19' 12.43; 117.862 mph	—— No Time
3	(Republic of Ireland) Michael Weldon; 750 cc Suzuki	Cancelled; No Time	—— No Time	19' 54.15; 113.744 mph	21' 12.41; 106.749 mph	19' 13.10; 115.983 mph
4	(England) Scott Wilson; 750 cc Suzuki	Cancelled; No Time	20' 57.20; 108.040 mph	19' 31.48; 115.945 mph	—— No Time	19' 13.36; 117.768 mph
5	(Republic of Ireland) Ryan McCay; 750 cc Suzuki	Cancelled; No Time	—— No Time	—— No Time	—— No Time	19' 22.38; 116.854 mph
6	(England) Phillip McGurk; 600 cc Honda	Cancelled; No Time	20' 27.37; 112.008 mph	20' 05.12; 112.709 mph	19' 31.60; 115.993 mph	19' 32.27; 115.867 mph
7	(Republic of Ireland) Mickey Fitzpatrick; 600 cc Honda	Cancelled; No Time	20' 27.37; 110.666 mph	20' 21.48; 111.200 mph	20' 07.51; 112.486 mph	19' 40.71; 115.040 mph
8	(England) Michael Russell; 750 cc Suzuki	Cancelled; No Time	—— No Time	20' 14.42; 111.846 mph	20' 06.18; 112.610 mph	19' 43.70; 114.749 mph
9	(Republic of Ireland) Wayne Kirwan; 600 cc Yamaha	Cancelled; No Time	20' 53.85; 108.329 mph	20' 35.80; 109.911 mph	—— No Time	19' 44.05; 114.715 mph
10	(Isle of Man) Ryan Kneen; 750 cc Suzuki	Cancelled; No Time	21' 57.33; 103.109 mph	21' 08.05; 117.006 mph	20' 23.72; 110.996 mph	19' 45.85; 114.542 mph
11	(Republic of Ireland) Kevin Fitzpatrick; 750 cc Suzuki	Cancelled; No Time	23' 03.92; 97.935 mph	21' 01.43; 107.678 mph	—— No Time	19' 45.86; 114.540 mph
12	(Isle of Man) Simon Fulton; 750 cc Suzuki	Cancelled; No Time	20' 51.06; 108.571 mph	20' 03.42; 112.869 mph	—— No Time	19' 47.20; 114.450 mph
13	(Northern Ireland) Trevor Ferguson; 750 cc Suzuki	Cancelled; No Time	20' 53.85; 108.329 mph	20' 35.80; 109.911 mph	20' 50.82; 111.717 mph	19' 49.46; 114.145 mph
14	(England) Peter Symes; 750 cc Suzuki	Cancelled; No Time	20' 50.08; 108.655 mph	20' 19.74; 111.358 mph	20' 06.01; 112.626 mph	19' 53.20; 113.835 mph
15	(Northern Ireland) Stephen Mcllvenna; 600 cc Yamaha	Cancelled; No Time	20' 39.26; 109.604 mph	19' 57.52; 113.425 mph	19' 54.33; 113.728 mph	19' 53.47; 113.809 mph
16	(Isle of Man) Glyn Jones; 750 cc Suzuki	Cancelled; No Time	—— No Time	20' 47.24; 108.903 mph	—— No Time	19' 54.41; 113.720 mph
17	(England) Andrew Jackson; 600 cc Honda	Cancelled; No Time	—— No Time	20' 07.89; 112.450 mph	20' 02.62; 112.943 mph	20' 07.82; 112.457 mph
18	(England) Bill Callister; 600 cc Honda	Cancelled; No Time	20' 37.06; 109.799 mph	20' 05.81; 112.645 mph	20' 24.70; 110.908 mph	20' 29.17; 110.504 mph

== Race results ==
=== Race 1; Newcomers Race A ===
Monday 25 August 2008 – Mountain Course 2 laps – 75.46 miles (121.40 km).

- Four-stroke Four-cylinder motorcycles exceeding 550 cc and not exceeding 750 cc.
- Four-stroke Twin-cylinder motorcycles exceeding 651 cc and not exceeding 1000 cc.
- Four-stroke Three-cylinder motorcycles exceeding 601 cc and not exceeding 675 cc.

Rank	Rider	Team	Speed	Time
1	(Isle of Man) Ryan Kneen	600 cc Suzuki	103.973 mph	43' 32.37
2	(England) Ivan Lintin	750 cc Suzuki	103.144 mph	43' 53.67
3	(Northern Ireland) James Redpath	750 cc Suzuki	102.073 mph	44' 21.39
4	(Republic of Ireland) Kevin Fitzpatrick	750 cc Suzuki	101.059 mph	44' 48.09
5	(England) James Shipley	599 cc Yamaha	97.386 mph	46' 29.26
6	(England) Damien Gledhill	600 cc Kawasaki	97.201 mph	46' 34.79
7	(Republic of Ireland) Declan Duffy	600 cc Yamaha	97.016 mph	46' 40.12
8	(England) Derek Jackson	600 cc Honda	94.546 mph	47' 53.28
9	(England) John Hildreth	600 cc Honda	92.687 mph	48' 50.90
10	(Isle of Man) Adam Jones	599 cc Kawasaki	92.393 mph	49' 00.21

Fastest Lap: Ryan Kneen – 104.005 mph (21' 45.97) on lap 2.

=== Race 1; Newcomers Race C ===
Monday 25 August 2008 – Mountain Course 2 laps – 75.46 miles (121.40 km).

- Two-stroke motorcycles exceeding 125 cc and 6 gears.
- Four-stroke motorcycles exceeding 251 cc and not exceeding 400 cc.
- Four-stroke Twin-cylinder motorcycles not exceeding 650 cc.

Rank	Rider	Team	Speed	Time
1	(Isle of Man) Dan Kneen	400 cc Honda	95.517 mph	46' 54.48
2	(England) Ian Whitlow	650 cc Suzuki	91.911 mph	49' 15.64
3	(England) Colin Martin	400 cc Honda	91.065 mph	49' 43.09
4	(Republic of Ireland) Derek Costello	400 cc Honda	89.673 mph	50' 29.41
5	(Northern Ireland) Dave Walsh	650 cc Suzuki	88.760 mph	51' 00.56
6	(Northern Ireland) Darren Gilpin	650 cc Suzuki	88.042 mph	53' 52.39

Fastest Lap: Daniel Kneen – 96.829 mph (23' 22.76) on lap 2.

=== Race 2; Senior Classic Race ===
Monday 25 August 2008 – Mountain Course 3 laps – 113.00 miles (181.96 km)

- For motorcycles exceeding 351 cc and not exceeding 500 cc.

Rank	Rider	Team	Speed	Time
1	(Northern Ireland) Ryan Farquhar	498 cc BIC Paton	102.385 mph	1:06.19.90
2	(England) Alan Oversby	500 cc Norton Manx	101.863 mph	1:06.40.30
3	(Isle of Man) Alan Brew	Seeley G50 496 cc	99.367 mph	1:08.20.78
4	(Scotland) Wattie Brown	500 cc Petty Manx	98.118 mph	1:09.12.98
5	(England) Andy Reynolds	499 cc BIC Paton	97.152 mph	1:09.54.28
6	(England) Bob Price	500 cc Seeley G50	96.890 mph	1:10.05.64
7	(England) Ken Davis	500 cc Norton Manx	95.948 mph	1:10.46.92
8	(England) Chris Swallow	476 cc Ducati	95.664 mph	1:10.59.52
9	(England) Mark Herbertson	499 cc Matchless G50	95.272 mph	1:11.17.05
10	(Isle of Man) Dave Madsen-Mygdal	499 cc Honda	92.209 mph	1:11.19.89

Fastest Lap: Ryan Farquhar – 103.572 mph (21' 51.44)

=== Race 3; Junior Classic Race ===
Wednesday 27 August 2008 – Mountain Course 3 laps – 113.00 miles (181.96 km)

- Class A for motorcycles exceeding 300 cc and not exceeding 350 cc.

Rank	Rider	Team	Speed	Time
1	(England) Roy Richardson	349 cc Honda	99.814 mph	1:08.02.42
2	(England) Paul Coward	348 cc K4 Honda	98.136 mph	1:09.12.26
3	(Northern Ireland) Ryan Farquhar	347 cc Honda	97.873 mph	1:09.23.39
4	(Isle of Man) Rich Hawkins	348 cc K4 Honda	97.743 mph	1:09.29.85
5	(Scotland) Wattie Brown	350 cc Honda	94.349 mph	1:11.58.88
6	(Northern Ireland) John Burrows	350 cc Honda	93.929 mph	1:12.18.19
7	(England) Bob Price	350 cc Honda	93.537 mph	1:12.36.41
8	(New Zealand) Paul Dobbs	350 cc Aermacchi	93.161 mph	1:12.53.99
9	(Isle of Man) Dave Madsen-Mygdal	349 cc Honda	92.922 mph	1:13.05.25
10	(England) Alec Whitwell	349 cc Honda	92.234 mph	1:13.37.95

Fastest Lap; Roy Richardson – 22 minutes 23.71 seconds 101.084 mph

=== Race 3; Lightweight Classic Race ===
Wednesday 27 August 2008 – Mountain Course 3 laps – 113.00 miles (181.96 km)

- Class B for motorcycles exceeding 175 cc and not exceeding 250 cc.

Rank	Rider	Team	Speed	Time
1	(Scotland) Ewan Hamilton	242 cc Suzuki	91.675 mph	1:14.04.88
2	(England) Peter Symes	250 cc Suzuki	91.453 mph	1:14.15.64
3	(England) Jonathan Cutts	246 cc Suzuki	90.695 mph	1:14.52.91
4	(England) Peter Richardson	248 cc Suzuki	89.936 mph	1:15.30.82
5	(Isle of Man) Ian Rycroft	249 cc Kawasaki	85.919 mph	1:19.02.67
6	(England) Bob Millinship	247 cc Ducati	85.311 mph	1:19.36.44
7	(England) Alan 'Bud' Jackson	247 cc Suzuki	85.523 mph	1:20.13.22
8	(England) Bob Simmons	247 cc Suzuki	84.482 mph	1:20.23.30
9	(England) Mervyn Stratford	247 cc Greeves Silverstone	83.984 mph	1:20.51.91
10	(England) Andy Wilson	247 cc Suzuki	83.634 mph	1:21.12.20

Fastest Lap; Ewan Hamilton – 23 minutes 57.29 seconds 94.503 mph

=== Race 4; Junior Manx Grand Prix ===
Wednesday 27 August 2008 – Mountain Course 3 laps – 113.00 miles (181.96 km)

- Two-stroke motorcycles exceeding 201 cc and not exceeding 250 cc.
- Four-stroke four-cylinder motorcycles exceeding 550 cc and not exceeding 600 cc.
- Four-stroke twin-cylinder motorcycles exceeding 651 cc and not exceeding 750 cc.

Rank	Rider	Team	Speed	Time
1	(Isle of Man) Daniel Kneen	600 cc Yamaha	115.686 mph	58' 42.33
2	(Republic of Ireland) Ryan McCay	600 cc Suzuki	113.318 mph	59' 55.93
3	(England) Phil McGurk	600 cc Honda	113.167 mph	1:00.00.74
4	(Republic of Ireland) Mickey Fitzpatrick	600 cc Honda	112.571 mph	1:00.19.80
5	(England) Russell Mountford	600 cc Yamaha	112.183 mph	1:00.31.31
6	(Northern Ireland) Trevor Fergusson	675 cc Triumph	111.558 mph	1:00.52.67
7	(England) Michael Russell	600 cc Suzuki	110.895 mph	1:01.14.62
8	(Republic of Ireland) Wayne Kirwan	600 cc Suzuki	110.891 mph	1:01.14.62
9	(Northern Ireland) Noel Patterson	600 cc Suzuki	110.767 mph	1:01.18.75
10	(England) Kirk Farrow	600 cc Honda	110.743 mph	1:01.19.54

Fastest Lap; Michael Weldon – 19 minutes 20.88 seconds 117.004 mph

=== Race 5; Senior Manx Grand Prix ===
Saturday 30 August 2008 – Mountain Course 2 laps – 75.46 miles (121.40 km) – Reduced Race Distance.

- Four-stroke Four-cylinder motorcycles exceeding 550 cc and not exceeding 750 cc.
- Four-stroke Twin-cylinder motorcycles exceeding 651 cc and not exceeding 1000 cc.
- Four-stroke Three-cylinder motorcycles exceeding 601 cc and not exceeding 675 cc.

Rank	Rider	Team	Speed	Time
1	(Wales) Adam Barclay	750 cc Suzuki	119.605 mph	37' 51.28
2	(Northern Ireland) James McCullagh	750 cc Suzuki	119.021 mph	38' 02.41
3	(Republic of Ireland) Mickey Fitzpatrick	600 cc Honda	117.530 mph	38' 31.38
4	(England) Scott Wilson	750 cc Suzuki	117.223 mph	38' 37.43
5	(Northern Ireland) Noel Patterson	750 cc Suzuki	116.731 mph	38' 47.19
6	(Republic of Ireland) Wayne Kirwan	750 cc Suzuki	116.731 mph	38' 47.19
7	(England) Michael Russell	600 cc Yamaha	116.576 mph	38' 50.29
8	(Republic of Ireland) Kevin Fitzpatrick	750 cc Suzuki	116.168 mph	38' 58.47
9	(England) Jules Croft	750 cc Suzuki	115.868 mph	39' 04.53
10	(Northern Ireland) Stephen Mcllvenna	600 cc Yamaha	115.618 mph	39' 09.59

Fastest Lap: Adam Barclay – 119.996 mph (18' 51.94) on lap 2.

=== Race 6a; Lightweight Manx Grand Prix ===
Saturday 30 August 2008 – Mountain Course 3 laps – 113.00 miles (181.96 km) – Reduced Race Distance.

- Two-stroke motorcycles 201 cc – 350 cc

Rank	Rider	Team	Speed	Time
1	(Isle of Man) Dan Sayle	250 cc Honda	111.072 mph	1:01.08.66
2	(Northern Ireland) Nigel Moore	250 cc Honda	110.823 mph	1:01.16.88
3	(England) Neil Kent	250 cc Yamaha	110.207 mph	1:01.37.44
4	(Northern Ireland) Brian Mateer	250 cc Yamaha	110.152 mph	1:01.39.28
5	(England) Brian Spooner	250 cc Yamaha	110.58 mph	1:01.42.45
6	(England) Ivan Lintin	250 cc Yamaha	108.512 mph	1:02.35.20
7	(England) Tom Snow	250 cc Honda	106.944 mph	1:03.30.24
8	(England) Robert Knight	250 cc Honda	106.050 mph	1:04.02.37
9	(Isle of Man) Dean Martin	250 cc Honda	105.112 mph	1:04.36.68
10	(Northern Ireland) Mark Waddell	250 cc Honda	103.887 mph	1:05.22.36

- Nigel Moore- 19 minutes 54.71 seconds 113.691 mph

=== Race 6b; Ultra-Lightweight Manx Grand Prix ===
Saturday 30 August 2008 – Mountain Course 3 laps – 113.00 miles (181.96 km) – Reduced Race Distance.

- Two-stroke motorcycles up to 125 cc, 6 gears maximum.
- Four-stroke motorcycles 251 cc – 401 cc
- Up to 650 cc Four-stroke twin-cylinder.

Rank	Rider	Team	Speed	Time
1	(Isle of Man) Daniel Kneen	400 cc Honda	106.619 mph	1:03.41.86
2	(England) Kirk Farrow	400 cc Honda	105.905 mph	1:04.07.62
3	(England) Ross Johnson	400 cc Kawasaki	105.161 mph	1:04.34.85
4	(England) Tim Sayers	400 cc Kawasaki	105.009 mph	1:04.40.47
5	(England) Dan Hobson	400c Honda	104.574 mph	1:04.56.60
6	(England) Marie Costello	400 cc Honda	103.668 mph	1:05.30.66
7	(England) Mike Minns	650 cc Kawasaki	103.659 mph	1:05.31.01
8	(Wales) Anthony Davies	399 cc Yamaha	103.389 mph	1:05.41.28
9	(England) Anthony Redmond	650 cc Kawasaki	103.047 mph	1:05.54.35
10	(England) Alistair Haworth	400 cc Yamaha	103.015 mph	1:05.55.58

- Fastest Lap Daniel Kneen – 21 minutes 01.59 seconds 107.664 mph.
