= Peter Hickman =

English motorcycle road racer

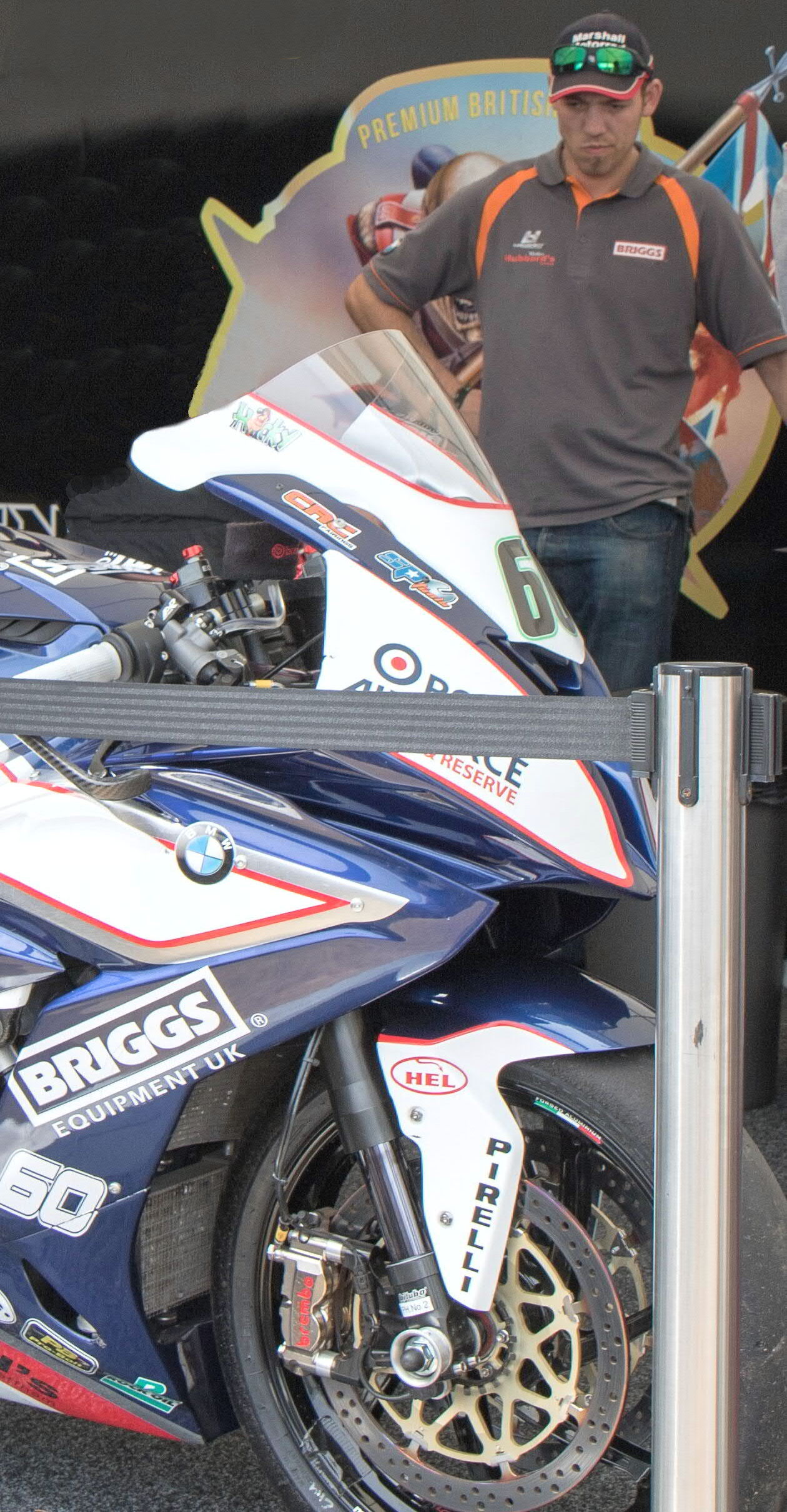
- Hickman with his BMW S1000RR at the Isle of Man TT races in 2015
- Nationality: English
- Born: 8 April 1987 (age 39); Burton-upon-Trent, Staffordshire, England
- Current team: 8TEN Racing
- Bike number: 60
- Website: Hicky 60
Motorcycle racing career statistics
Superbike World Championship
Active years	2022–
Manufacturers	BMW
Championships	0
2022 championship position	30th (2 pts)
Starts / Wins / Podiums / Poles / F. laps / Points; 6 / 0 / 0 / 0 / 0 / 2
British Superbike Championship
Active years	2006–present
Manufacturers	BMW, Honda, Kawasaki, Yamaha
Championships	0
2024 championship position	15th
Starts / Wins / Podiums / Poles / F. laps / Points; 468 / 7 / 25 / 5 / 7 / 4437
Isle of Man TT career
TTs contested	10 (2014–2019, 2022-present)
TT wins	14
First TT win	2018 Superstock TT
Last TT win	2024 Superbike TT
TT podiums	33

Peter John Hickman (born 8 April 1987), also known by his nickname Hicky (sometimes spelled Hickey in motorsport media), is an English professional motorcycle racer and business owner for preparation of racing machines.

For 2021, Hickman competed in the British Superbike Championship class aboard a BMW M1000RR, initially with superbike teammate Xavi Forés for new team FHO Racing, formed from some elements of Hickman's old team Smiths Racing, which closed at the end of the 2020 season. He continued with the same team during 2022, and again into 2023 with a teammate, Josh Brookes.

Hickman started TT racing in 2014. He won two in 2018, three in 2019, followed by four in 2022 and 2023, following the resumption of TT racing after two years of no Isle of Man TT events during COVID-19 travel restrictions. The tally of four wins in one week of racing has only been achieved by two other riders, Phillip McCallen and Michael Dunlop, and Ian Hutchinson who scored five in 2010. Hickman has 14 TT victories in total, which puts him in sixth on the all-time winners list.

Hickman currently holds the all-time lap record at the Isle of Man TT Mountain Course, set in 2023 during the Superstock TT race 2, with an average of 136.358 mph (219.447 km/h) over the 37.73 mi (60.72 km) long race circuit.

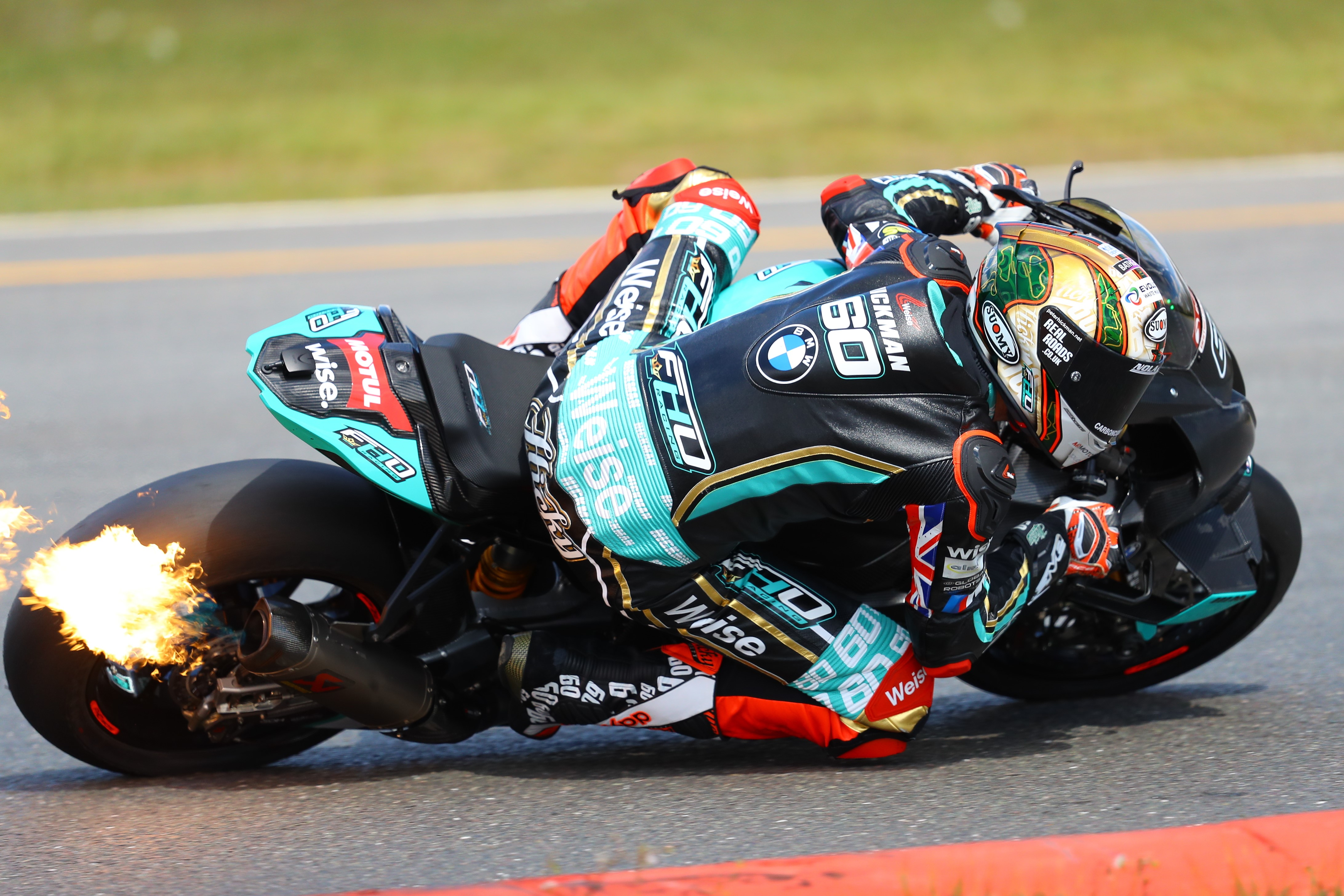
Hickman 2021

== Racing background ==
=== Short circuit ===
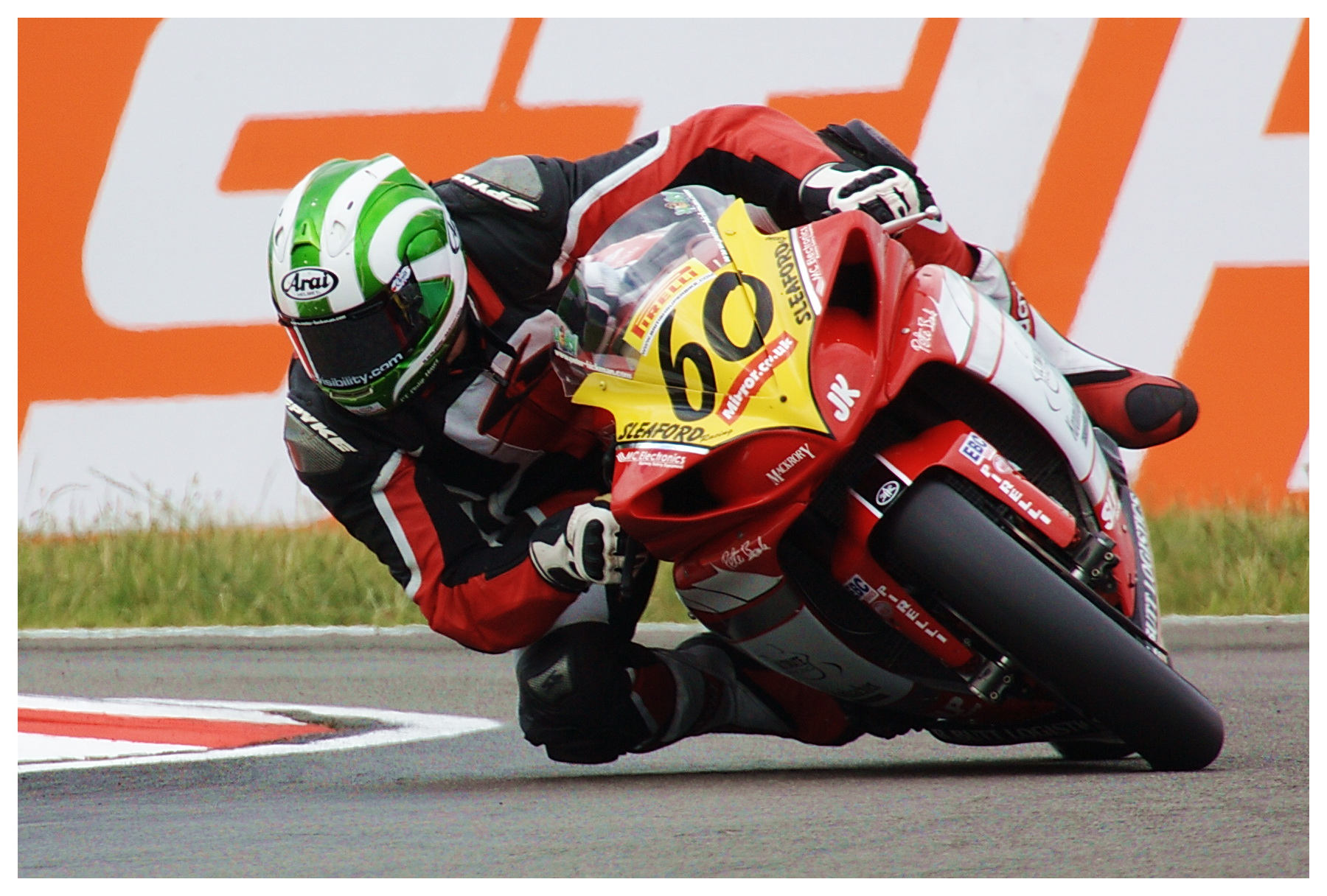
Hickman at Snetterton in 2009

Hickman took his first BSB race win at Cadwell Park in 2014. After starting the season without a ride, he rode for Tsingtao WK Kawasaki for a single round before joining the RAF Reserves Honda team for the rest of the season at Knockhill.

Hickman took a career best championship position of fourth in 2017. He finished the 2019 British Superbike Championship season in sixth place, the 2020 season in 14th, 2021 in fifth place, 2022 in ninth, and 2023 in 12th.

In 2022, Hickman was announced as a wild card for the Donington Park World Superbike event, riding his usual British Superbike BMW M1000RR, with suitable alterations including a World Superbike specification CPU. He later replaced Michael van der Mark at the factory BMW team for the Autodrom Most round, taking his first points with a 14th-place result in race 2.

=== Isle of Man TT races ===
In his debut year (2014), Hickman reached the record as the fastest-ever newcomer at the Isle of Man TT, with a fastest average lap speed of 129.104 mph (207.773 km/h), and a race-average speed of 125.38 mph (201.78 km/h). In 2022, the record was surpassed by Glenn Irwin, who reached 129.85 mph (208.97 km/h). He prepared for his TT race debut by travelling to the Isle of Man and driving 70 laps of the near-38 mile course in a hire car, and by watching videos. Hickman's father Dave was a Manx Grand Prix winner and entered two TTs.

Hickman clinched his first victory at the Isle of Man TT in a close race from Michael Dunlop and Dean Harrison, breaking Ian Hutchinson's lap record twice in the 2018 Superstock event. Hickman won the Senior TT, raising the absolute lap record to 135.452 mph (217.989 km/h) on the final lap, winning from Dean Harrison with Manxman Conor Cummins in third.

Hickman won three TTs in 2019, and four in 2022 and 2023. In 2024 he won one, bringing his all-time total to 14.

=== Other UK road races ===
Hickman achieved his first international road race win at the 2015 Ulster Grand Prix, winning the feature race ahead of Conor Cummins.

=== Macau Grand Prix ===
Hickman won the last race of the 2015 season in November, the Macau Grand Prix, riding a Briggs Equipment/RAF Reserves BMW S1000RR.

In November 2016, Hickman retained his Macau Grand Prix title, after he worked his way through from fourth position, winning by just 0.533 seconds from eight-time winner Michael Rutter.

In the 2017 event, Hickman was placed second, in front of event team-mate Michael Rutter, both riding Bathams BMWs.

In 2018, Hickman won the Macau event for a third time, riding his BMW S1000RR prepared by Smiths Racing for Aspire Ho, ahead of Rutter (Bathams Aspire Ho Honda RC213V-S) and Martin Jessop (PBM Ducati).

In 2019, Hickman was again the man to beat, taking pole in front of Rutter. The race was a controversial affair, as it was stopped by two red flags due to accidents, with insufficient laps completed to declare a result. It was initially declared null and void, before Michael Rutter was declared the winner as he was leading the last completed lap, even though Hickman was leading the field when both red flags were deployed.

The race was not held in 2020 and 2021, and Hickman, like most top British riders, did not take part in 2022 due to travel restrictions. Hickman took a comfortable fourth win in 2023, 28 seconds in front of Davey Todd and the first win for FHO BMW.

== Career statistics ==
=== By class ===
- 2008 - NC, FIM Superstock 1000 Cup, Yamaha YZF-R1

=== British Superbike Championship ===
Year	Make	1		2		3		4		5		6		7		8		9		10		11		12		13		Pos	Pts	Ref
Year	Make	R1	R2	R1	R2	R1	R2	R1	R2	R1	R2	R1	R2	R1	R2	R1	R2	R1	R2	R1	R2	R1	R2	R1	R2	R1	R2	Pos	Pts	Ref
2006	Kawasaki	BHI; 21	BHI; 17	DON; Ret	DON; 16	THR; 18	THR; Ret	OUL; 19	OUL; 20	MON; C	MON; C	MAL; 14	MAL; 19	SNE; 14	SNE; 10	KNO; 17	KNO; 16	OUL; 14	OUL; 16	CRO; 14	CRO; 8	CAD; 14	CAD; 15	SIL; 10	SIL; 15	BHGP; 16	BHGP; 11	18th	42	
2007	Kawasaki	BHGP; 15	BHGP; 12	THR; 12	THR; 12	SIL; 18	SIL; 19	OUL	OUL	SNE; 17	SNE; Ret	MON; 17	MON; 14	KNO; 23	KNO; DNS	OUL; 13	OUL; 13	MAL; 14	MAL; 16	CRO	CRO	CAD	CAD	DON	DON	BHI	BHI	22nd	23	
2008	Honda	THR	THR	OUL	OUL	BHGP	BHGP	DON	DON	SNE	SNE	MAL	MAL	OUL	OUL	KNO	KNO	CAD	CAD	CRO	CRO	SIL; 14	SIL; 16	BHI; 25	BHI; 16			33rd	2	

Year	Make	1		2		3			4		5		6			7			8			9			10		11		12			Pos	Pts	Ref
Year	Make	R1	R2	R1	R2	R1	R2	R3	R1	R2	R1	R2	R1	R2	R3	R1	R2	R3	R1	R2	R3	R1	R2	R3	R1	R2	R1	R2	R1	R2	R3	Pos	Pts	Ref
2009	Yamaha	BHI; 21	BHI; 23	OUL; 18	OUL; 15	DON; 16	DON; 14		THR; 16	THR; 15	SNE; 17	SNE; 15	KNO; 12	KNO; 14		MAL; 12	MAL; 14		BHGP; Ret	BHGP; 20	BHGP; 20	CAD; 14	CAD; 11		CRO; 11	CRO; 15	SIL; 15	SIL; 13	OUL; 14	OUL; Ret	OUL; DNS	22nd	35	
2010	Yamaha	BHI; 15	BHI; Ret	THR; 11	THR; 13	OUL; 12	OUL; 17		CAD; 13	CAD; 13	MAL; Ret	MAL; 15	KNO; Ret	KNO; C		SNE; 15	SNE; Ret	SNE; 11	BHGP; 19	BHGP; 13	BHGP; 14	CAD; Ret	CAD; 16		CRO; 12	CRO; 16	SIL; 20	SIL; 10	OUL; 14	OUL; Ret	OUL; Ret	19th	43	
2011	Honda	BHI; 13	BHI; 9	OUL; 13	OUL; 8	CRO; 7	CRO; 9		THR; 5	THR; 2	KNO; 13	KNO; 8	SNE; 10	SNE; DNS		OUL; Ret	OUL; C		BHGP; 25	BHGP; 10	BHGP; 9	CAD; 8	CAD; 5	CAD; 5	DON; 7	DON; Ret	SIL; Ret	SIL; 7	BHGP; Ret	BHGP; 14	BHGP; 9	9th	155	
2012	Kawasaki	BHI; 16	BHI; C	THR; Ret	THR; 12	OUL; 16	OUL; 11	OUL; Ret	SNE	SNE																						17th	65	
2012	BMW										KNO; Ret	KNO; 13	OUL; 8	OUL; 13	OUL; 12	BHGP; Ret	BHGP; Ret		CAD; 10	CAD; 8		DON; 18	DON; 15		ASS; Ret	ASS; 16	SIL; 14	SIL; 10	BHGP; Ret	BHGP; 10	BHGP; 7	17th	65	
2013	Honda	BHI; 12	BHI; 13	THR; 11	THR; 10	OUL; 6	OUL; Ret		KNO; 10	KNO; 9	SNE; 13	SNE; 13	BHGP; 13	BHGP; 13		OUL; 12	OUL; 12	OUL; 13	CAD; 8	CAD; 7		DON; 11	DON; 13		ASS; 12	ASS; 7	SIL; 7	SIL; Ret	BHGP; 15	BHGP; Ret	BHGP; 12	11th	113	
2014	Kawasaki	BHI	BHI	OUL	OUL	SNE; 19	SNE; Ret																									11th	120	
2014	Honda								KNO; 14	KNO; 13	BHGP; 12	BHGP; 13	THR; 12	THR; 10		OUL; 7	OUL; Ret	OUL; 13	CAD; 6	CAD; 1		DON; 7	DON; 7		ASS; 12	ASS; Ret	SIL; 9	SIL; 9	BHGP; 13	BHGP; 11	BHGP; 9	11th	120	
2015	BMW	DON; 5	DON; 4	BHI; Ret	BHI; 14	OUL; DNS	OUL; DNS		SNE; 12	SNE; 15	KNO; 10	KNO; 9	BHGP; Ret	BHGP; 13		THR; Ret	THR; Ret		CAD; 2	CAD; 2		OUL; 10	OUL; 6	OUL; Ret	ASS; 9	ASS; 13	SIL; 3	SIL; 8	BHGP; 12	BHGP; 12	BHGP; 11	9th	150	
2016	Kawasaki	SIL; Ret	SIL; 1	OUL; 12	OUL; 12	BHI; 7	BHI; 8		KNO; 5	KNO; 4	SNE; Ret	SNE; 8	THR; 12	THR; 6		BHGP; 11	BHGP; 11		CAD; 7	CAD; 4		OUL; 3	OUL; 7	OUL; 7	DON; 5	DON; 4	ASS; 16	ASS; 14	BHGP; 1	BHGP; 3	BHGP; 12	7th	233	
2017	BMW	DON; 4	DON; 8	BHI; 9	BHI; 7	OUL; 5	OUL; 7		KNO; 6	KNO; 9	SNE; 7	SNE; 6	BHGP; 4	BHGP; 4		THR; 2	**THR**; 1		CAD; 4	CAD; 3		SIL; 9	SIL; 8	SIL; Ret	OUL; 8	OUL; 4	ASS; 7	ASS; 6	BHGP; 7	BHGP; 6	BHGP; 6	4th	578	
2018	BMW	DON; 8	DON; Ret	BHI; 10	BHI; 14	OUL; Ret	OUL; 11		SNE; 7	SNE; 6	KNO; 10	KNO; 10	BHGP; 6	BHGP; 10		THR; 3	THR; 2		CAD; 7	CAD; 4		SIL; 8	SIL; Ret	SIL; 19	OUL; 8	OUL; 8	ASS; 4	**ASS**; 3	BHGP; 5	BHGP; 6	BHGP; 9	5th	577	
2019	BMW	SIL; 14	SIL; 14	OUL; 6	OUL; 11	DON; 10	DON; 9	DON; 7	BRH; 5	BRH; 7	KNO; 11	KNO; 6	SNE; 7	SNE; 5		THR; 5	THR; 3		CAD; 5	CAD; 5		OUL; DNS	OUL; 8	OUL; 8	ASS; 8	ASS; 8	DON; 4	DON; Ret	BHGP; 7	BHGP; 8	BHGP; 5	6th	558	

Year	Bike	1			2			3			4			5			6			7			8			9			10			11			Pos	Pts
Year	Bike	R1	R2	R3	R1	R2	R3	R1	R2	R3	R1	R2	R3	R1	R2	R3	R1	R2	R3	R1	R2	R3	R1	R2	R3	R1	R2	R3	R1	R2	R3	R1	R2	R3	Pos	Pts
2020	BMW	DON; 12	DON; 18	DON; 11	SNE; 13	SNE; 11	SNE; Ret	SIL; 14	SIL; 11	SIL; 15	OUL; 12	OUL; 10	OUL; 8	DON; 12	DON; Ret	DON; 11	BRH; 13	BRH; 8	BRH; 8																14th	71
2021	BMW	OUL; 4	OUL; 3	**OUL**; 5	KNO; Ret	KNO; 7	KNO; 8	BHGP; Ret	BHGP; 9	BHGP; 7	THR; 3	THR; 5	THR; 8	DON; 9	DON; 4	**DON**; 14	CAD; 1	**CAD**; 1	CAD; 2	SNE; 7	SNE; 10	SNE; 7	SIL; Ret	SIL; 10	SIL; 12	OUL; 5	OUL; 5	OUL; 4	DON; Ret	DON; Ret	DON; 7	BHGP; 5	BHGP; 5	BHGP; 5	5th	1092
2022	BMW	SIL; 11	SIL; 7	SIL; 9	OUL; 5	OUL; 8	OUL; 9	DON; 9	DON; 4	DON; Ret	KNO; 13	KNO; Ret	KNO; 12	BRH; 11	BRH; 12	BRH; 8	THR; 5	THR; 4	THR; Ret	CAD; 6	CAD; 7	CAD; 6	SNE; 8	SNE; 5	SNE; 2	OUL; DSQ	OUL; 10	OUL; 7	DON; 3	**DON**; 8	DON; 11	BRH; 2	BRH; 1	BRH; 5	9th	283
2023	BMW	SIL; 11	SIL; Ret	SIL; 12	OUL; 4	OUL; Ret	OUL; 6	DON; 13	DON; 7	DON; 11	KNO; 16	KNO; Ret	KNO; 12	SNE; 20	SNE; DNS	SNE; Ret	BRH; 8	BRH; 12	BRH; Ret	THR; 10	THR; 8	THR; 9	CAD; 9	CAD; Ret	CAD; 10	OUL; 9	OUL; 10	OUL; 11	DON; 9	DON; 10	DON; 7	BRH; 6	BRH; 9	BRH; Ret	12th	173
2024	BMW	NAV; 12	NAV; 10		OUL; 13	OUL; 15	OUL; Ret	DON; WD	DON; WD	DON; WD	KNO; Ret	KNO; Ret	KNO; WD	SNE; Ret	SNE; 15	SNE; 14	BRH; 15	BRH; 12	BRH; 13	THR; 10	THR; 13	THR; 12	CAD; 12	CAD; 15	CAD; 9	OUL; 8	OUL; 14	OUL; 11	DON; 14	DON; 13	DON; Ret	BRH; 5	BRH; 8	BRH; 11	15th	120
2025	BMW	OUL; 13	OUL; 16	OUL; C	DON; Ret	DON; 15	DON; 16	SNE	SNE	SNE	KNO	KNO	KNO	BRH	BRH	BRH	THR	THR	THR	CAD	CAD	CAD	DON	DON	DON	ASS	ASS	ASS	OUL	OUL	OUL	BRH	BRH	BRH	19th*	4*

* Season still in progress.

=== FIM Superstock 1000 Cup ===
==== Races by year ====
(key) (Races in bold indicate pole position) (Races in italics indicate fastest lap)

Year	Bike	1	2	3	4	5	6	7	8	9	10	Pos	Pts
2008	Yamaha	VAL	NED	MNZ	NŰR	SMR	BRN	BRA; 17	DON; 16	MAG; 21	ALG; Ret	NC	0

=== Superbike World Championship ===
==== Races by year ====
(key) (Races in bold indicate pole position) (Races in italics indicate fastest lap)

Year	Bike	1			2			3			4			5			6			7			8			9			10			11			12			Pos	Pts
Year	Bike	R1	SR	R2	R1	SR	R2	R1	SR	R2	R1	SR	R2	R1	SR	R2	R1	SR	R2	R1	SR	R2	R1	SR	R2	R1	SR	R2	R1	SR	R2	R1	SR	R2	R1	SR	R2	Pos	Pts
2022	BMW	SPA	SPA	SPA	NED	NED	NED	POR	POR	POR	ITA	ITA	ITA	GBR; 22	GBR; 16	GBR; 19	CZE; 22	CZE; 19	CZE; 14	FRA	FRA	FRA	SPA	SPA	SPA	POR	POR	POR	ARG	ARG	ARG	INA	INA	INA	AUS	AUS	AUS	30th	2

^{*} Season still in progress.

=== Isle of Man TT ===
==== TT race victories ====
Year	Race	Motorcycle	Average Speed
2024	Superbike TT	BMW	135.534 mph
2023	Senior TT	BMW	132.526 mph
2023	Supertwin 2 TT	Yamaha	119.318 mph
2023	Superstock 2 TT	BMW	133.676 mph
2023	Superstock 1 TT	BMW	132.937 mph
2022	Senior TT	BMW	129.432 mph
2022	Supertwin TT	Paton	120.006 mph
2022	Superstock TT	BMW	130.552 mph
2022	Superbike TT	BMW	130.634 mph
2019	Supersport 2 TT	Triumph	127.671 mph
2019	Superstock TT	BMW	130.488 mph
2019	Superbike TT	BMW	132.644 mph
2018	Senior TT	BMW	131.700 mph
2018	Superstock TT	BMW	131.553 mph

==== TT career summary ====
Position	1st	2nd	3rd	4th	5th	7th	8th	10th	11th	14th	21st	DNF
No of times	14	13	5	2	1	1	4	2	1	1	1	7

Last updated in June 2026
