= Superstock TT =

Motorcycle road race in the Isle of Man

2014 Isle of Man TT Races
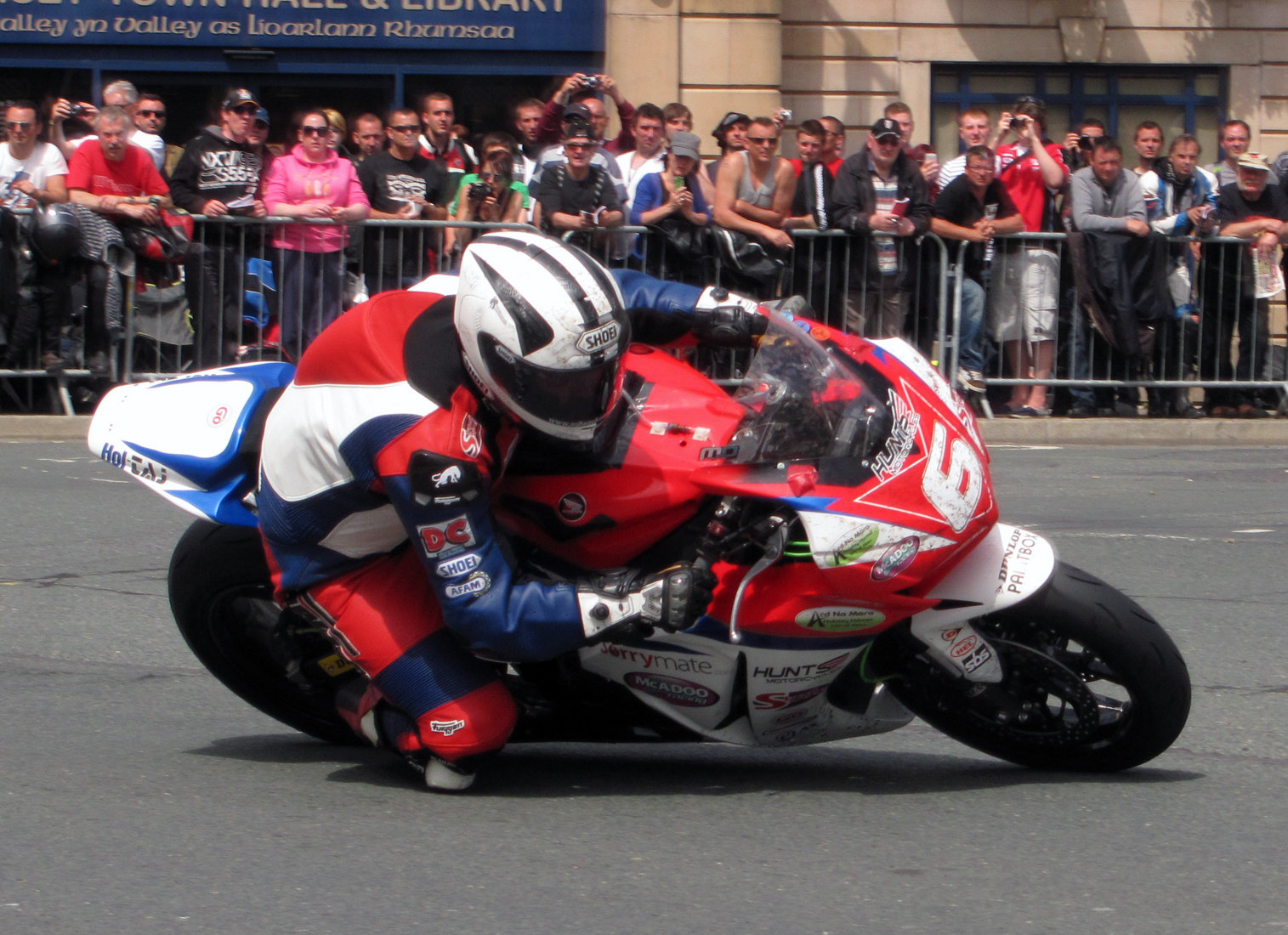
- Michael Dunlop Superstock TT 1000cc Honda lap 2 - Parliament Square, Ramsey – 3 June 2013

Race details
| Date | Superstock TT - 3 June 2014 |
| Location | Douglas, Isle of Man |
| Type | Road Course |
| Current Course | Snaefell Mountain Course; 37.73 mi (60.72 km) |

Superstock TT
| Fastest Lap | Pole Position |
|---|---|
| (England) Gary Johnson | (Northern Ireland) Michael Dunlop |
| 130.207 mph | 129.778 mph |
Podium
1. (Northern Ireland) Michael Dunlop
| 2. (England) Dean Harrison | 3. (New Zealand) Bruce Anstey |

The Superstock TT is a motorcycle road race that takes place during the Isle of Man TT festival. The event for production based motor-cycles racing on treaded road tyres is based on the FIM Superstock 1000 Championship specifications.

== Engine capacity ==
The Production TT, racing for production based motor-cycles had been part of the Isle of Man TT Races since 1967 for 250cc, 500cc & 750cc classes replacing the Lightweight, Junior and Senior production motor-cycles of the Clubmans TT races (1947 – 1956). These production based machines raced until the 1976 Isle of Man TT when the classes were discontinued. The Production TT was reintroduced for the 1984 Isle of Man TT Races for 3 class classes, reduced to two classes on safety grounds for the 1990 races. For the 2005 Isle of Man TT the Superstock TT race replaced the previous 1000cc & 600cc Production TT classes that had been part of the Isle of Man TT race schedule since 1989.

== Eligibility ==
=== Entrants ===
- Entrants must be in possession of a valid National Entrants or FIM Sponsors Licence for Road Racing.

=== Machines ===
The 2012 specification for entries into the Superstock TT race are defined as;-

- Any machine complying with the following specifications:
  - Superstock TT: (Machines complying with the 2012 FIM Superstock Championships specifications)
    - Over 600cc up to 1000cc 4 cylinders 4-stroke
    - Over 750cc up to 1000cc 3 cylinders 4-stroke
    - Over 850cc up to 1200cc 2 cylinders 4-stroke

=== Official Qualification Time ===
- 115% of the time set by the third fastest qualifier in the class.

== Speed and Lap Records ==
The lap record for the Superstock TT is a time of 16 minutes and 50.601 seconds, at an average speed of 134.403 miles per hour (216.301 km/h) set by Peter Hickman on lap 4 of the 2018 Superstock TT. The race record for the Superstock TT is 1 hour, 8 minutes and 49.976 seconds, at an average race speed of 131.553 mph (211.714 km/h) for 4 laps of the Mountain Course, and is also held by Hickman; set in the same race.

In the 2023 Isle of Man TT Superstock race, Peter Hickman broke the outright lap record at over 136mph, with a race time of 50 minutes 48.3 seconds.

== Superstock TT Race Winners ==
| Year | Rider | Motorcycle | Average Race Speed |
|---|---|---|---|
| 2005 | (New Zealand) Bruce Anstey | Suzuki | 124.242 mph |
| 2006 | (New Zealand) Bruce Anstey | Suzuki | 124.147 mph |
| 2007 | (New Zealand) Bruce Anstey | Suzuki | 125.875 mph |
| 2008 | (Australia) Cameron Donald | Suzuki | 125.776 mph |
| 2009 | (England) Ian Hutchinson | Honda | 127.612 mph |
| 2010 | (England) Ian Hutchinson | Honda | 128.100 mph |
| 2011 | (Northern Ireland) Michael Dunlop | Kawasaki | 127.129 mph |
| 2012 | (England) John McGuinness | Honda | 126.657 mph |
| 2013 | (Northern Ireland) Michael Dunlop | Honda | 128.218 mph |
| 2014 | (Northern Ireland) Michael Dunlop | BMW | 127.216 mph |
| 2015 | (England) Ian Hutchinson | Kawasaki | 129.197 mph |
| 2016 | (England) Ian Hutchinson | BMW | 129.745 mph |
| 2017 | (England) Ian Hutchinson | BMW | 129.383 mph |
| 2018 | (England) Peter Hickman | BMW | 131.553 mph |
| 2019 | (England) Peter Hickman | BMW | 130.488 mph |
| 2022 | (England) Peter Hickman | BMW | 130.552 mph |
| 2023 | (England) Peter Hickman | BMW | 132.937 mph |
| 2024 | (England) Davey Todd | BMW | 132.699 mph |
| 2025 | (England) Dean Harrison | Honda | 134.667 mph |

=== Multiple winners (riders) ===
| Rider | Wins |
|---|---|
| Ian Hutchinson | 5 |
| Peter Hickman | 4 |
| Bruce Anstey, Michael Dunlop | 3 |

=== Multiple winners (manufacturers) ===
| Marque | Wins |
|---|---|
| BMW | 8 |
| Honda | 5 |
| Suzuki | 4 |
| Kawasaki | 2 |

== See also ==
- TT Zero
- Lightweight TT
- Ultra-Lightweight TT
- Sidecar TT
- Junior TT
- Senior TT
