= 2014 Isle of Man TT =

Motorcycle road race

2014 Isle of Man TT Races
- Isle of Man TT Mountain Course layout

Race details
- Date: 24 May – 6 June 2014
- Location: Douglas, Isle of Man
- Course: Isle of Man TT Mountain Course; 37.733 mi (60.725 km)

Superbike TT
Pole Position	Fastest Lap
(Northern Ireland) Michael Dunlop	(New Zealand) Bruce Anstey
131.501 mph	132.298 mph
Podium
1. (Northern Ireland) Michael Dunlop
2. (England) Guy Martin	3. (Isle of Man) Conor Cummins

Sidecar TT Race 1
Pole Position	Fastest Lap
(Isle of Man) Dave Molyneux / (England) Patrick Farrance	(Isle of Man) Dave Molyneux / (England) Patrick Farrance
114.350 mph	115.538 mph
Podium
1. (England) Conrad Harrison / (England) Mike Aylott
2. (England) John Holden / (England) Andrew Winkle	3. (England) Tim Reeves / (France) Gregory Cluze

Supersport TT Race 1
Pole Position	Fastest Lap
(England) Gary Johnson	(England) Gary Johnson
125.934 mph	126.732 mph
Podium
1. (England) Gary Johnson
2. (New Zealand) Bruce Anstey	3. (Northern Ireland) Michael Dunlop

Superstock TT Race
Pole Position	Fastest Lap
(England) Gary Johnson	(Northern Ireland) Michael Dunlop
130.207 mph	129.778 mph
Podium
1. (England) Gary Johnson
2. (England) Dean Harrison	3. (New Zealand) Bruce Anstey

TT Zero Race
Pole Position	Fastest Lap
(England) John McGuinness	(England) John McGuinness
115.597 mph	117.366 mph
Podium
1. (England) John McGuinness
2. (New Zealand) Bruce Anstey	3. (England) Rob Barber

Supersport TT Race 2
Pole Position	Fastest Lap
(England) Gary Johnson	(Northern Ireland) Michael Dunlop
125.934 mph	127.403 mph
Podium
1. (Northern Ireland) Michael Dunlop
2. (New Zealand) Bruce Anstey	3. (Northern Ireland) William Dunlop

Sidecar TT Race 2
Pole Position	Fastest Lap
(Isle of Man) Dave Molyneux / (England) Patrick Farrance	(Isle of Man) Dave Molyneux / (England) Patrick Farrance
114.350 mph	113.756 mph
Podium
1. (Isle of Man) Dave Molyneux / (England) Patrick Farrance
2. (England) Conrad Harrison / (England) Mike Aylott	3. (England) John Holden / (England) Andrew Winkle

Lightweight TT Race
Pole Position	Fastest Lap
(England) Dean Harrison	(Scotland) Keith Amor
117.297 mph	118.989 mph
Podium
1. (England) Dean Harrison
2. (England) James Hillier	3. (England) Bruce Anstey

The 2014 Isle of Man TT Festival was held between Saturday 24 May and Friday 6 June 2014 on the 37.73-mile Isle of Man TT Mountain Course. The main races were six solo motorcycle races and two sidecar races. The festival also included Pre-TT Classic Races held on 23, 24 & 26 May 2014 at the Billown Circuit in Castletown. Post-TT races scheduled for 7 June 2014 were cancelled by race organisers on safety grounds due to a thunderstorm and heavy overnight rain.

The 2014 TT Festival held a Lap of Honour of the Snaefell Mountain Course in memory of Simon Andrews who earlier had suffered a fatal crash during the 1000 cc Superstock event of the 2014 North West 200 races in May.

== Practice Week ==
As with the 2013 Isle of Man TT races, the first part of the 2014 Practice Week was again dominated by inclement weather with the first evening session on Saturday 24 May cancelled due to heavy rain and mist on the Mountain Section of the course. The Tuesday evening practice was curtailed after an incident at Kerrowmoar with a sidecar outfit. The Wednesday session on the 28 May held in cloudy and overcast conditions was red-flagged due to an incident at Barregarrow after the solo competitors had completed only one lap. The rest of the Wednesday evening session was cancelled after rainfall returned to the northern sections of the Snaefell Mountain Course. The Sidecar class started the Thursday evening session before being red-flagged after 20 minutes due to a civilian medical emergency in the Quarterbridge area of Douglas. After the practice session was restarted, the start of the practice for solos was again delayed due to another incident with a sidecar outfit at Pinfold Cottage near Ramsey. In contrast, the Friday evening practice session was held in good weather and a number of solo competitors completing five laps of the Mountain Course.

== Race Week ==
The blue ribbon event of the 2014 races, the Senior TT, was won by Michael Dunlop marking the 75th anniversary of the only solo TT race victory by a factory BMW Motorrad machine ridden by Georg Schorsch Meier during the 1939 500 cc Senior Isle of Man TT Race.

The 2014 TT races were again dominated by Michael Dunlop, repeating his 2013 IOM TT feat of winning four races within a week, riding a 1000 cc BMW in the Superbike TT and Superstock TT classes and a 600 cc Honda in Supersport TT Race 2. The 2014 Joey Dunlop TT Championship was won for the second consecutive year by Michael Dunlop with 116 points, with Bruce Anstey having 82 points and Dean Harrison in third place scoring 54 points. Michael Dunlop also scored a Junior/Senior TT double win during the 2014 TT Races raising his tally of Isle of Man TT race wins to 11 victories and 1 Classic TT win.

Gary Johnson won the Supersport TT Race 1 riding a three-cylinder 675 cc Triumph at an average race speed of 124.526 mph, the first victory by a British machine since Bruce Anstey, also on a Triumph, won the 2003 600 cc Junior TT Race. The 2014 TT Zero Race was won by John McGuinness at a race-average speed of 117.366 mph, raising his tally of Isle of Man TT race wins to 21, the first win in the TT electric motorcycle category for the Shinden San / Mugen factory team.

The Sidecar TT produced another maiden winner, with Race 1 being won by Conrad Harrison/Mike Aylott on a Shelbourne Honda 600 cc outfit at a race-average speed of 113.987 mph. The Lightweight TT Race also produced another maiden winner in Dean Harrison, after race favourite and fastest in practice Ivan Lintin retired on lap 1 at Union Mills with an electrical problem. With his father Conrad Harrison winning the Sidecar Race 1 and Dean Harrison's Lightweight win this was the first occasion of father/son winners in different classes of during the same race week.

The Sidecar TT Race 2 was won by Dave Molyneux/Patrick Farrance riding a 600 cc DMR Kawasaki outfit at a race-average speed of 113.147 mph, raising his TT wins to 17. Molyneux also celebrated the 25th anniversary of his first win in the 1989 Isle of Man TT Sidecar Race 'A' with passenger Colin Hardman at an average race speed of 104.56 mph.

A new outright course lap record was set by Bruce Anstey, with a time of 17 minutes, 06.682 seconds at an average speed of 132.298 mph during lap 6 of the 2014 Superbike TT Race. A further race lap record was set by Michael Dunlop, recording a new class record for the Senior TT class of 17 minutes, 11.591 seconds, at an average speed of 131.668 mph. The Vernon Cooper Trophy for Fastest Newcomer was won by Peter Hickman, riding a 1000 cc BMW, during lap 6 of the Senior TT with a time of 17 minutes, 32.078 seconds at an average speed of 129.104 mph. After completing a number of practice laps, Mark Higgins broke his own car record for the Snaefell Mountain Course driving a 2015 Subaru WRX STI with a lap time of 19 minutes, 15.88 at an average speed of 117.510 miles per hour (189.114 km/h)

A fatal accident to veteran Manx Grand Prix and TT competitor Bob Price occurred at Ballaugh Bridge during the Supersport TT Race 1. Former British Supersport champion Karl Harris crashed fatally at the 26th Milestone while competing in the Superstock TT Race.

== Results ==
=== Practice times ===
==== Practice times and leaderboard Superbike/Senior TT ====
Plates; Black on white - black on yellow.

Rank	Rider	Sat 24 May	Mon 26 May	Tues 27 May	Wed 28 May	Thurs 29 May	Fri 30 May	Thurs 5 June
1	(Northern Ireland) Michael Dunlop; 1000cc BMW	—— No time	18' 03.721; 125.335 mph	17' 32.669; 129.032 mph	17' 35.470; 128.690 mph	Cancelled; No time	17' 12.901; 131.501 mph	19' 00.986; 119.044 mph
2	(New Zealand) Bruce Anstey; 1000cc Honda	—— No time	17' 45.544; 127.473 mph	17' 18.000; 130.860 mph	—— No time	Cancelled; No time	17' 19.693; 130.642 mph	17' 49.078; 120.300 mph
3	(England) Guy Martin; 1000cc Suzuki	—— No time	—— No time	17' 31.591; 129.164 mph	17' 40.722; 128.052 mph	Cancelled; No time	17' 24.014; 130.102 mph	17' 36.563; 128.556 mph
4	(England) John McGuinness; 1000cc Honda	—— No time	17' 54.969; 126.355 mph	17' 29.715; 129.395 mph	17' 29.870; 122.382 mph	Cancelled; No time	17' 26.522; 129.790 mph	17' 54.043; 126.464 mph
5	(Isle of Man) Dan Kneen; 1000cc Suzuki	—— No time	18' 09.601; 124.658 mph	17' 59.263; 128.853 mph	—— No time	Cancelled; No time	17' 32.059; 129.107 mph	17' 54.885; 126.365 mph
6	(England) Michael Rutter; 1000cc BMW	—— No time	18' 08.891; 124.740 mph	17' 35.154; 128.728 mph	17' 51.887; 126.719 mph	Cancelled; No time	17' 33.884; 128.883 mph	18' 01.436; 125.600 mph
7	(Isle of Man) Conor Cummins; 1000cc Honda	—— No time	18' 20.886; 123.381 mph	17' 35.231; 128.719 mph	—— No time	Cancelled; No time	17' 52.457; 126.651 mph	17' 44.924; 127.547 mph
8	(Northern Ireland) William Dunlop; 1000cc Suzuki	—— No time	18' 03.155; 125.400 mph	17' 41.902; 127.910 mph	17' 41.898; 127.911 mph	Cancelled; No time	17' 38.117; 128.368 mph	17' 35.182; 128.725 mph
9	(England) Gary Johnson; 1000cc Honda	—— No time	18' 00.697; 125.686 mph	17' 43.590; 127.707 mph	—— No time	Cancelled; No time	17' 41.111; 128.005 mph	—— No time
10	(Australia) Josh Brookes; 1000cc Yamaha	—— No time	18' 48.782; 114.258 mph	18' 07.997; 124.842 mph	18' 12.768; 124.297 mph	Cancelled; No time	17' 41.234; 127.991 mph	17' 50.490; 128.884 mph

==== Practice times and leaderboard Supersport Junior TT ====
Plates; blue.

Rank	Rider	Sat 24 May	Mon 26 May	Tues 27 May	Wed 28 May	Thurs 29 May	Fri 30 May
1	(England) Gary Johnson; 675cc Triumph	—— No time	18' 27.727; 122.619 mph	18' 19.142; 123.576 mph	—— No time	18' 50.858; 120.111 mph	17' 58.563; 125.934 mph
2	(Northern Ireland) Michael Dunlop; 600cc Honda	—— No time	—— No time	18' 30.998; 122.258 mph	—— No time	18' 10.724; 124.530 mph	—— No time
3	(Northern Ireland) William Dunlop; 600cc Suzuki	—— No time	18' 29.153; 122.461 mph	18' 23.729; 123.063 mph	—— No time	18' 24.489; 122.978 mph	18' 11.203; 124.475 mph
4	(Scotland) Keith Amor; 600cc Honda	—— No time	—— No time	17' 29.715; 129.395 mph	18' 42.885; 121.071 mph	—— No time	18' 12.252; 124.356 mph
5	(England) Dean Harrison; 600cc Yamaha	—— No time	19' 10.222; 118.089 mph	18' 25.567; 122.858 mph	—— No time	18' 16.397; 123.886 mph	—— No time
6	(England) Michael Rutter; 675cc Triumph	—— No time	19' 33.849; 115.712 mph	18' 20.693; 123.402 mph	—— No time	18' 46.513; 120.574 mph	18' 16.505; 123.874 mph
7	(England) Lee Johnston; 600cc Honda	—— No time	19' 09.304; 118.183 mph	18' 17.131; 123.803 mph	—— No time	—— No time	18' 22.454; 123.205 mph
8	(Australia) Josh Brookes; 600cc Yamaha	—— No time	—— No time	18' 30.649; 122.296 mph	—— No time	—— No time	18' 21.980; 124.258 mph
9	(New Zealand) Bruce Anstey; 600cc Honda	—— No time	—— No time	—— No time	18' 23.158; 123.127 mph	18' 30.706; 122.290 mph	—— No time
10	(England) Guy Martin; 600cc Suzuki	—— No time	—— No time	18' 26.060; 122.803 mph	—— No time	18' 54.425; 119.733 mph	—— No time

==== Practice times and leaderboard Superstock TT ====
Plates; red.

Rank	Rider	Sat 24 May	Mon 26 May	Tues 27 May	Wed 28 May	Thurs 29 May	Fri 30 May	Sat 31 May
1	(England) Gary Johnson; 1000cc Kawasaki	—— No time	—— No time	—— No time	—— No time	Cancelled; No time	17' 23.173; 130.207 mph	—— No time
2	(Northern Ireland) Michael Dunlop; 1000cc BMW	—— No time	18' 22.152; 123.239 mph	17' 59.370; 125.840 mph	—— No time	Cancelled; No time	17' 30.219; 129.333 mph	17' 58.023; 125.997 mph
3	(England) Dean Harrison; 1000cc Kawasaki	—— No time	—— No time	17' 43.590; 127.707 mph	—— No time	Cancelled; No time	17' 36.021; 128.622 mph	18' 03.343; 125.379 mph
4	(Northern Ireland) William Dunlop; 1000cc Suzuki	—— No time	18' 29.153; 122.461 mph	—— No time	—— No time	Cancelled; No time	17' 38.117; 128.368 mph	18' 08.361; 124.801 mph
5	(England) James Hillier; 1000cc Kawasaki	—— No time	18' 41.000; 121.167 mph	17' 55.922; 126.243 mph	—— No time	Cancelled; No time	17' 45.754; 127.448 mph	—— No time
6	(England) Guy Martin; 1000cc Suzuki	—— No time	—— No time	18' 26.987; 122.701 mph	—— No time	Cancelled; No time	—— No time	17' 47.697; 127.216 mph
7	(New Zealand) Bruce Anstey; 1000cc Honda	—— No time	—— No time	18' 05.878; 125.086 mph	—— No time	Cancelled; No time	18' 00.791; 125.675 mph	17' 52.557; 126.639 mph
8	(England) Michael Rutter; 1000cc BMW	—— No time	18' 58.123; 119.344 mph	18' 03.805; 125.325 mph	—— No time	Cancelled; No time	17' 52.663; 126.627 mph	—— No time
9	(Isle of Man) Conor Cummins; 1000cc Honda	—— No time	—— No time	—— No time	17' 55.715; 126.268 mph	Cancelled; No time	—— No time	18' 31.947; 122.153 mph
10	(England) Lee Johnston; 1000cc Honda	—— No time	—— No time	18' 27.767; 126.614 mph	—— No time	Cancelled; No time	—— No time	17' 56.741; 126.147 mph

==== Practice times and leaderboard Lightweight TT ====
Plates; green.

Rank	Rider	Sat 24 May	Mon 26 May	Tues 27 May	Wed 28 May	Thurs 29 May	Fri 30 May	Sat 31 May	Thurs 5 June
1	(England) Ivan Lintin; 650cc Kawasaki	Cancelled; No time	—— No time	19' 17.982; 117.297 mph	—— No time	19' 56.952; 113.478 mph	—— No time	19' 45.108; 114.612 mph	—— No time
2	(Northern Ireland) Ryan Farquhar; 650cc Kawasaki	Cancelled; No time	—— No time	19' 46.768; 114.452 mph	—— No time	19' 35.052; 115.593 mph	—— No time	19' 22.514; 116.840 mph	19' 53.702; 113.787 mph
3	(England) Oliver Linsdell; 650cc Paton	Cancelled; No time	—— No time	19' 41.628; 114.950 mph	—— No time	—— No time	—— No time	19' 28.656; 116.226 mph	—— No time
4	(Scotland) Keith Amor; 650cc Kawasaki	Cancelled; No time	—— No time	19' 35.036; 115.595 mph	—— No time	19' 28.854; 116.206 mph	—— No time	20' 11.413; 112.124 mph	19' 34.808; 115.617 mph
5	(Northern Ireland) Jamie Hamilton; 650cc Kawasaki	Cancelled; No time	—— No time	19' 54.862; 113.677 mph	—— No time	19' 49.267; 114.212 mph	—— No time	19' 33.884; 115.708 mph	18' 38.562; 115.249 mph
6	(England) James Cowton; 650cc Kawasaki	Cancelled; No time	—— No time	19' 40.746; 115.036 mph	—— No time	20' 14.084; 111.877 mph	—— No time	19' 40.115; 115.097 mph	19' 36.917; 115.410 mph
7	(England) James Hillier; 650cc Kawasaki	Cancelled; No time	—— No time	19' 43.758; 114.743 mph	—— No time	—— No time	—— No time	—— No time	—— No time
8	(England) Gary Johnson; 650cc Kawasaki	Cancelled; No time	—— No time	19' 51.308; 114.016 mph	—— No time	19' 53.122; 113.843 mph	—— No time	—— No time	—— No time
9	(Czechoslovakia) Michal Dokoupil; 650cc Kawasaki	Cancelled; No time	—— No time	20' 37.083; 109.797 mph	—— No time	—— No time	—— No time	19' 58.272; 113.353 mph	20' 08.285; 112.414 mph
10	(England) Dean Harrison; 650cc Kawasaki	Cancelled; No time	—— No time	20' 00.022; 113.190 mph	—— No time	20' 01.361; 113.062 mph	—— No time	—— No time	20' 18.334; 111.487 mph

=== Race results ===
==== 2014 Superbike TT final standings. ====
31 May 2014 6 Laps (226.38 Miles) TT Mountain Course.

Rank	Rider	Team	Speed	Time
1	(Northern Ireland) Michael Dunlop	BMW 1000cc	128.415 mph	1:45.46.384
2	(England) Guy Martin	Suzuki 1000cc	128.000 mph	1:46.06.954
3	(Isle of Man) Conor Cummins	Honda 1000cc	127.940 mph	1:46.09.934
4	(New Zealand) Bruce Anstey	Honda 1000cc	127.504 mph	1:46.31.687
5	(England) Michael Rutter	BMW 1000cc	127.176 mph	1:46.48.186
6	(Northern Ireland) William Dunlop	Suzuki 1000cc	126.982 mph	1:46.57.992
7	(England) John McGuinness	Honda 1000cc	126.966 mph	1:46.58.722
8	(England) Dean Harrison	Kawasaki 1000cc	126.160 mph	1:47.39.797
9	(England) James Hillier	Kawasaki 1000cc	125.674 mph	1:48.04.777
10	(Australia) Josh Brookes	Yamaha 1000cc	125.660 mph	1:48.05.487

Fastest Lap and New Overall Course Record: Bruce Anstey – 132.298 mph (212.913 km/h) (17' 06.682) on lap 6.

==== 2014 Sidecar TT Race 1 TT final standings ====
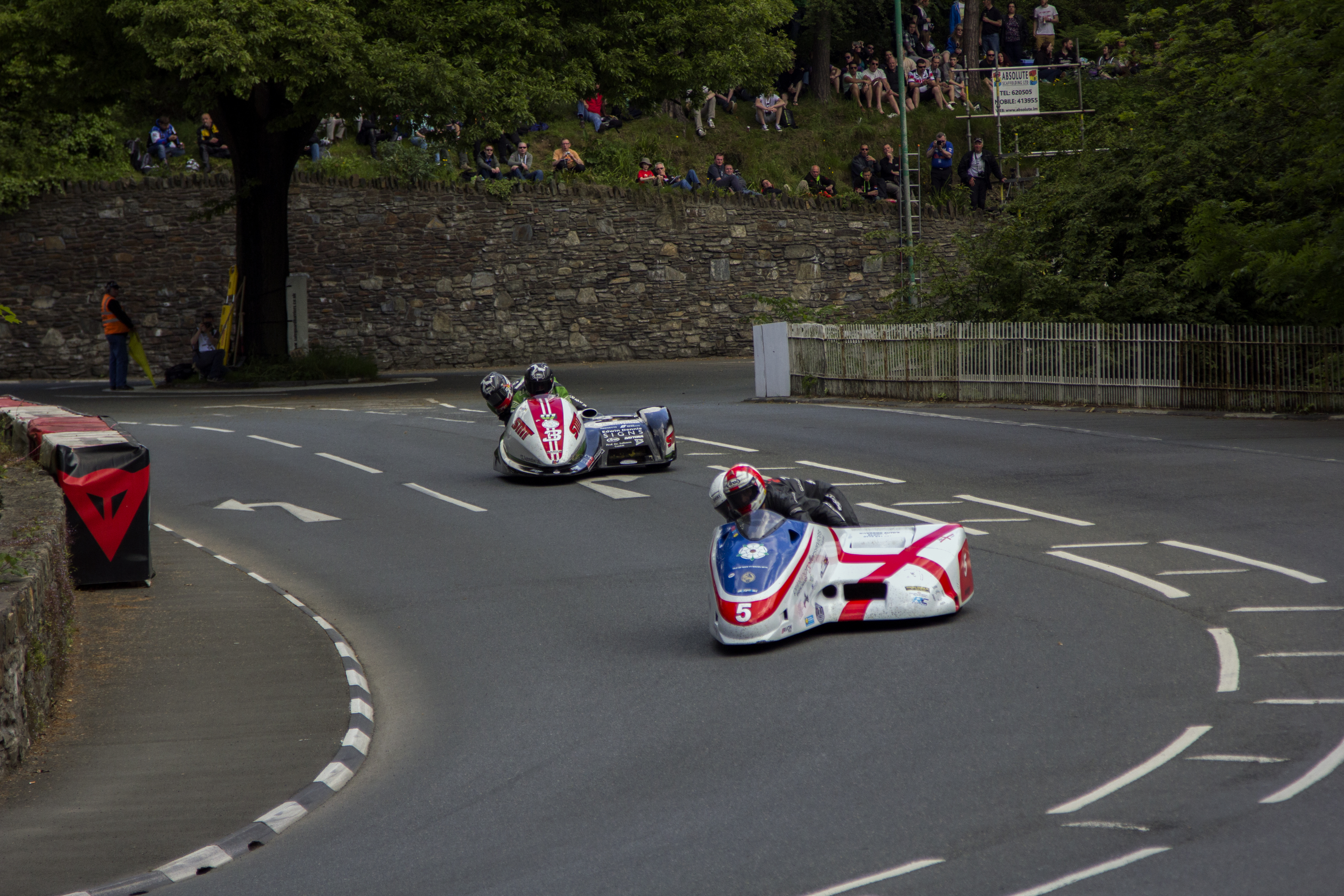
Conrad Harrison took his first and only TT win in race 1

31 May 2014 3 Laps (113.00 Miles) Mountain Course.

Rank	Rider	Team	Speed	Time
1	(England) Conrad Harrison / (England) Mike Aylott	Shelbourne Honda 600cc	113.987 mph	59' 34.820
2	(England) John Holden / (England) Andrew Winkle	LCR 600cc	113.448 mph	59' 51.823
3	(England) Tim Reeves / (France) Gregory Cluze	DMR 600cc	112.926 mph	1:00.08.410
4	(England) Ian Bell / (England) Carl Bell	Yamaha 600cc	110.396 mph	1:01.31.122
5	(Isle of Man) Karl Bennett / (Isle of Man) Lee Cain	Kawasaki 600cc	110.362 mph	1:01.32.236
6	(England) Wayne Lockey / (England) Mark Sayers	Ireson Honda 600cc	109.579 mph	1:01.58.646
7	(Isle of Man) Darren Hope / (Isle of Man) Paul Bumfrey	DMR Kawasaki 600cc	108.692 mph	1:02.28.692
8	(England) Gregory Lambert / (England) Kenny Cole	Honda 600cc	108.382 mph	1:02.39.691
9	(England) Roy Hanks / (England) Kevin Perry	Molyneux 600cc	108.173 mph	1:02.46.954
10	(Scotland) Gordon Shand / (England) Phil Hyde	Shand 600cc	107.960 mph	1:02.54.414

Fastest Lap: Dave Molyneux / Patrick Farrance – 115.538 mph (185.940 km/h) (19' 35.612) on lap 2.

==== 2014 Supersport Junior TT Race 1 ====
2 June 2014 4 Laps (150.73 Miles) Mountain Course.

Rank	Rider	Team	Speed	Time
1	(England) Gary Johnson	Triumph 675cc	124.526 mph	1:12.43.035
2	(New Zealand) Bruce Anstey	Honda 600cc	124.483 mph	1:12.44.483
3	(Northern Ireland) Michael Dunlop	Honda 600cc	124.483 mph	1:12.54.719
4	(England) Dean Harrison	Yamaha 600cc	123.350 mph	1:13.24.646
5	(Northern Ireland) William Dunlop	Suzuki 600cc	122.996 mph	1:13.37.324
6	(England) Guy Martin	Suzuki 600cc	122.794 mph	1:13.44.591
7	(England) James Hillier	Kawasaki 600cc	121.520 mph	1:14.30.983
8	(England) Lee Johnston	Honda 600cc	121.481 mph	1:14.32.414
9	(England) Michael Rutter	Triumph 675cc	121.305 mph	1:14.38.907
10	(Scotland) Keith Amor	Honda 600cc	121.051 mph	1:14.48.288

Fastest Lap: Gary Johnson – 126.732 mph (203.955 km/h) (17' 51.711) on lap 2.

==== 2014 Superstock TT final standings. ====
3 June 2014 4 Laps (150.73 Miles) Mountain Course.

Rank	Rider	Team	Speed	Time
1	(Northern Ireland) Michael Dunlop	BMW 1000cc	127.216 mph	1:11.10.773
2	(England) Dean Harrison	Kawasaki 1000cc	126.620 mph	1:11.30.882
3	(New Zealand) Bruce Anstey	Honda 1000cc	125.936 mph	1:11.54.197
4	(Australia) David Johnson	Kawasaki 1000cc	125.424 mph	1:12.11.802
5	(England) Lee Johnston	Honda 1000cc	125.244 mph	1:12.18.017
6	(England) Michael Rutter	BMW 1000cc	125.305 mph	1:12.18.305
7	(Isle of Man) Dan Kneen	Suzuki 1000cc	124.261 mph	1:12.52.351
8	(England) Peter Hickman	BMW 1000cc	123.670 mph	1:13.13.249
9	(England) John McGuinness	Honda 1000cc	123.618 mph	1:13.15.099
10	(England) James Hillier	Kawasaki 1000cc	123.345 mph	1:13.24.822

Fastest Lap: Michael Dunlop – 129.778 mph (208.857 km/h) (17' 26.621) on lap 2.

==== 2014 TT Zero Race ====
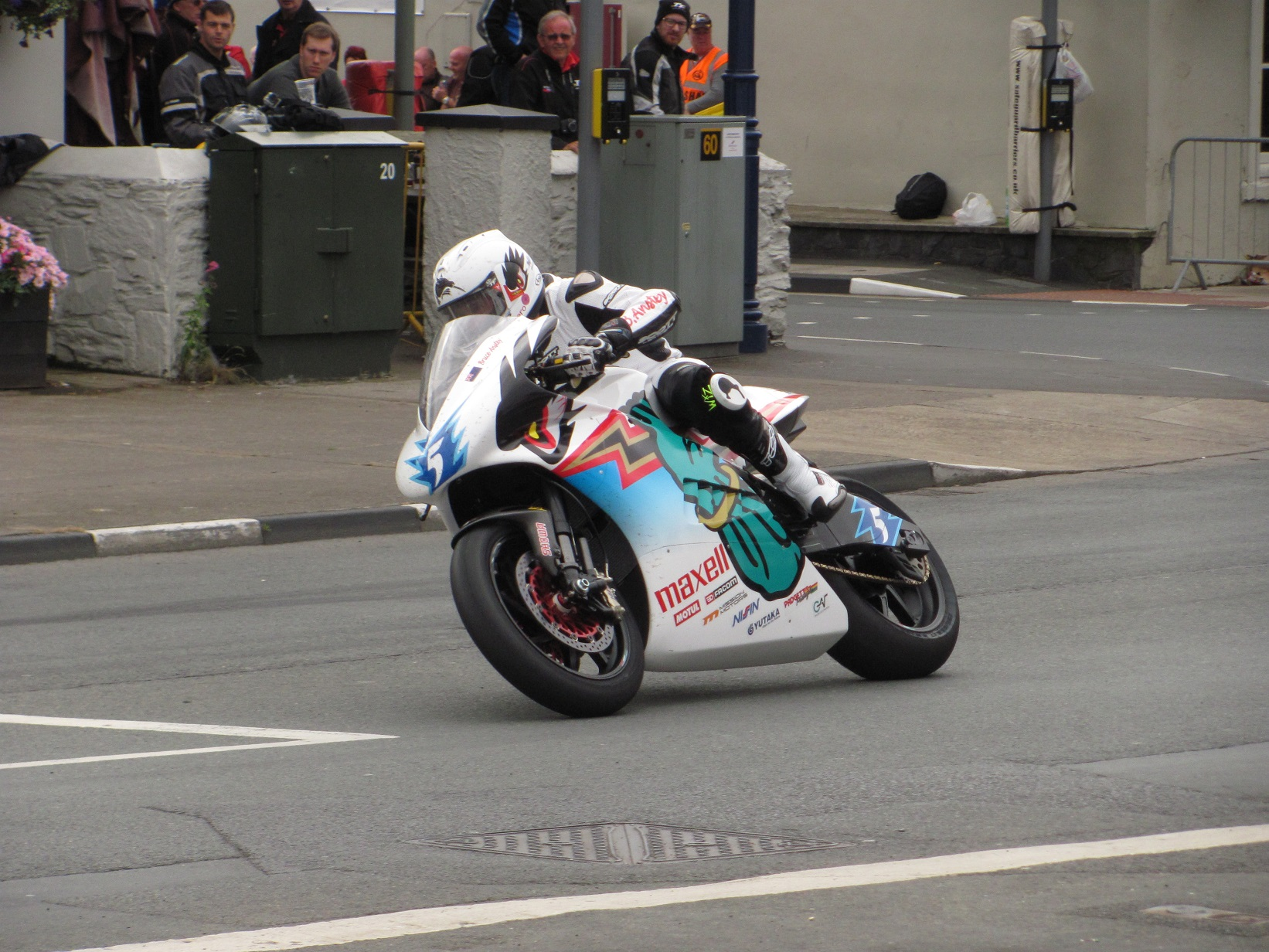
Bruce Anstey (pictured in practice) finished second in the TT Zero

4 June 2014 1 Lap (37.73 Miles) Mountain Course.

Rank	Rider	Team	Speed	Time
1	(England) John McGuinness	Honda Shinden San / Team Mugen	117.366 mph	19' 17.300
2	(New Zealand) Bruce Anstey	Honda Shinden San / Team Mugen	115.048 mph	19' 40.625
3	(England) Rob Barber	RW-x2 / Ohio State University	93.531 mph	24' 12.230
4	(Scotland) Robert Wilson	Team Sarolea Racing	93.507 mph	24' 12.600
5	(United States) Mark Miller	VercarloMoto	85.828 mph	26' 22.828
6	(France) Timothee Monot	TT Zero	81.515 mph	29' 02.378

- (9 Starters)

Fastest Lap and New Race Record: John McGuinness – 117.366 mph (188.882 km/h) (19' 17.366) on lap 1.

==== 2014 Supersport Junior TT Race 2 ====
4 June 2014 4 Laps (150.73 Miles) Mountain Course.

Rank	Rider	Team	Speed	Time
1	(Northern Ireland) Michael Dunlop	Honda 600cc	125.078 mph	1:12.23.794
2	(New Zealand) Bruce Anstey	Honda 600cc	124.788 mph	1:12.33.883
3	(Northern Ireland) William Dunlop	Suzuki 600cc	124.394 mph	1:12.47.678
4	(England) Dean Harrison	Yamaha 600cc	123.350 mph	1:13.03.459
5	(England) James Hillier	Kawasaki 600cc	122.985 mph	1:13.37.712
6	(Scotland) Keith Amor	Honda 600cc	122.655 mph	1:13.49.580
7	(England) Ivan Lintin	Honda 600cc	122.380 mph	1:13.59.555
8	(Isle of Man) Dan Kneen	Honda 600cc	122.112 mph	1:14.09.289
9	(England) Dan Stewart	Honda 675cc	121.061 mph	1:14.11.141
10	(England) Guy Martin	Suzuki 600cc	121.542 mph	1:14.30.161

Fastest Lap: Michael Dunlop – 127.403 mph (205.035 km/h) (17' 46.129) on lap 2.

==== 2014 Sidecar TT Race 2 TT final standings ====
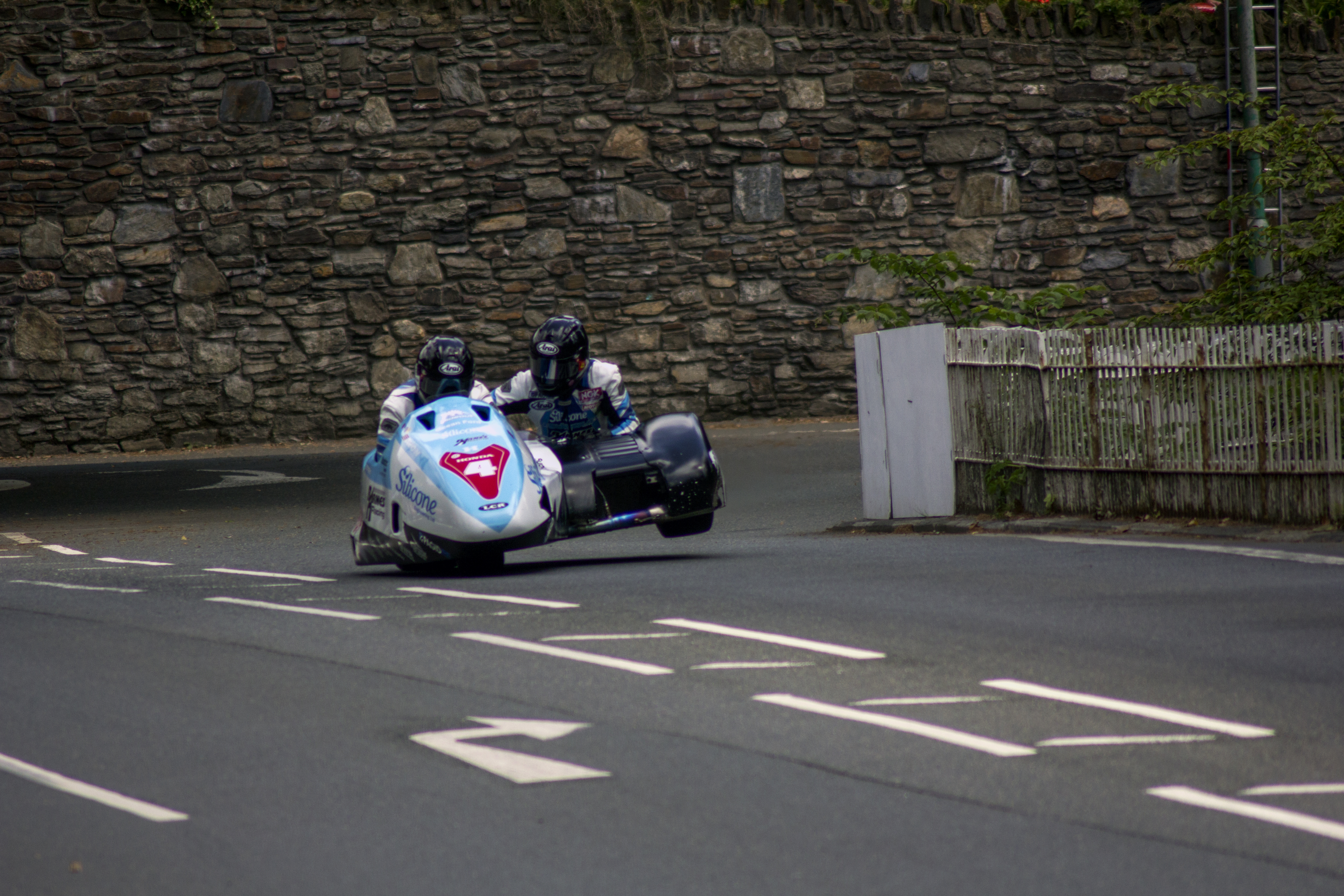
John Holden and Andrew Winkle (pictured in Race 1) took their second podium of the week in Race 2

5 June 2014 3 Laps (113.00 Miles) Mountain Course.

Rank	Rider	Team	Speed	Time
1	(Isle of Man) Dave Molyneux / (England) Patrick Farrance	DMR 600cc	113.147 mph	1:00.01.355
2	(England) Conrad Harrison / (England) Mike Aylott	Shelbourne Honda 600cc	113.987 mph	1:00.45.285
3	(England) John Holden / (England) Andrew Winkle	LCR 600cc	113.448 mph	1:01.01.282
4	(England) Tim Reeves / (France) Gregory Cluze	DMR 600cc	110.522 mph	1:01.26.906
5	(Isle of Man) Karl Bennett / (Isle of Man) Lee Cain	Kawasaki 600cc	110.233 mph	1:01.36.566
6	(England) Alan Founds / (England) Tom Peters	LCR Suzuki 600cc	107.700 mph	1:03.03.517
7	(England) Gregory Lambert / (England) Kenny Cole	Honda 600cc	107.458 mph	1:03.12.024
8	(England) Wayne Lockey / (England) Mark Sayers	Ireson Honda 600cc	107.425 mph	1:03.13.207
9	(England) John Saunders / (England) Robert Lunt	Shelbourne 600cc	106.602 mph	1:03.42.483
10	(England) Robert Handcock / (England) Basil Bevan	Baker 600cc	106.475 mph	1:03.47.042

Fastest Lap: Dave Molyneux / Patrick Farrance – 113.756 mph (183.073 km/h) (19' 54.027) on lap 3.

==== 2014 Lightweight TT 650cc Super-Twin ====
6 June 2014 3 Laps (113.00 Miles)

Rank	Rider	Team	Speed	Time
1	(England) Dean Harrison	Kawasaki 650cc	117.460 mph	57' 49.129
2	(England) James Hillier	Kawasaki 650cc	116.967 mph	58' 03.755
3	(England) James Cowton	Kawasaki 650cc	116.666 mph	58' 12.754
4	(Scotland) Keith Amor	Kawasaki 650cc	116.552 mph	58' 16.164
5	(Northern Ireland) Jamie Hamilton	Kawasaki 650cc	115.625 mph	58' 44.190
6	(England) Oliver Linsdell	Paton 650cc	114.638 mph	59' 14.638
7	(Northern Ireland) Ryan Farquhar	Kawasaki 650cc	114.025 mph	59' 33.625
8	(England) Daniel Cooper	Kawasaki 650cc	113.772 mph	59' 41.580
9	(England) Connor Behan	Kawasaki 650cc	112.442 mph	1:00.24.584
10	(Czech Republic) Michal Dokoupil	Kawasaki 650cc	112.223 mph	1:00.31.019

Fastest Lap: Keith Amor – 118.989 mph (191.494 km/h) (19' 01.514) on lap 3.

==== 2014 Senior TT final standings. ====
6 June 2014 6 Laps – (226.38 Miles) Mountain Course.

Rank	Rider	Team	Speed	Time
1	(Northern Ireland) Michael Dunlop	BMW 1000cc	128.680 mph	1:45.33.291
2	(Isle of Man) Conor Cummins	Honda 1000cc	127.940 mph	1:45.47.291
3	(England) Guy Martin	Suzuki 1000cc	128.201 mph	1:45.56.962
4	(New Zealand) Bruce Anstey	Honda 1000cc	127.722 mph	1:46.20.814
5	(England) James Hillier	Kawasaki 1000cc	127.693 mph	1:46.22.262
6	(England) John McGuinness	Honda 1000cc	127.375 mph	1:46.38.179
7	(Australia) Josh Brookes	Yamaha 1000cc	125.660 mph	1:46.43.877
8	(Isle of Man) Dan Kneen	Kawasaki 1000cc	126.381 mph	1:47.28.519
9	(England) Michael Rutter	BMW 1000cc	126.262 mph	1:47.34.561
10	(Australia) David Johnson	Kawasaki 1000cc	125.551 mph	1:48.11.127

Fastest Lap and New Class Record: Michael Dunlop – 131.668 mph (211.899 km/h) (17' 11.591) on lap 2.

== See also ==
- Manx Grand Prix
- North West 200
- Ulster Grand Prix

== Bibliography ==
- "Island Racer 2014: Essential Guide to the Isle of Man TT". Island Racer. Mortons Media Group. 2014 – via Kelsey Publishing.
