= 2022 Isle of Man TT =

Motorcycle race

2022 Isle of Man TT Races
- Isle of Man TT Mountain Course layout

Race details
- Date: 29 May - 10 June 2022
- Location: Douglas, Isle of Man
- Course: Isle of Man TT Mountain Course; 37.733 mi (60.725 km)

The 2022 Isle of Man TT was held between 29 May and 10 June 2022, on the Isle of Man TT Mountain Course. It was the first Isle of Man TT event since 2019.

The event was broadcast live for the first time in its 115-year existence on the new TT+ online service.

Peter Hickman dominated the event with 4 wins, with Michael Dunlop taking the remaining two solo races. The Birchall brothers extended their win streak with two Sidecar TT wins.

The event was marred by the death of 6 competitors, making it the deadliest since 1970. Two riders died in the Supersport class, second-time TT participant Mark Purslow in practice and the experienced Davy Morgan during the first Supersport TT. Four riders died in the Sidecar class in 2 different accidents, newcomers Cesar Chanal and Olivier Lavorel in race 1, and the father and son duo of Roger and Bradley Stockton in race 2. Rider-journalist Mike Booth lost his leg during a practice crash.

== Results ==
=== Superbike TT Race ===
4 June 2022, 6 laps

Position	Number	Rider	Machine	Time	Speed (mph)
1	10	(England) Peter Hickman	BMW	01:43:58.544	130.634
2	2	(England) Dean Harrison	Kawasaki	01:44:37.744	129.819
3	6	(Northern Ireland) Michael Dunlop	Suzuki	01:44:56.171	129.439
4	4	(England) Ian Hutchinson	BMW	01:46:56.628	127.009
5	1	(England) John McGuinness	Honda	01:47:07.411	126.796
6	12	(England) Jamie Coward	Yamaha	01:47:07.849	126.787
7	5	(England) James Hillier	Yamaha	01:47:33.288	126.287
8	22	(Northern Ireland) Glenn Irwin	Honda	01:47:40.140	126.153
9	19	(Northern Ireland) Shaun Anderson	Suzuki	01:48:29.935	125.188
10	16	(England) Dominic Herbertson	BMW	01:49:00.109	124.611

=== Sidecar TT Race 1 ===
The race was started on 4 June 2022, then red flagged on lap 1 due to the fatal accident of Cesar Chanal and Olivier Lavorel. It was re-started on 6 June 2022 as a 2 laps race.

Position	Number	Rider	Machine	Time	Speed (mph)
1	1	(England) Ben Birchall / Tom Birchall	Honda LCR	38:11.339	118.558
2	7	(Isle of Man) Ryan Crowe / (Isle of Man) Callum Crowe	Honda LCR	38:25.328	117.838
3	5	Peter Founds / Jevan Walmsley	Honda LCR	38:25.440	117.833
4	4	(Isle of Man) Dave Molyneux / Daryl Gibson	DMR	39:52.553	113.542
5	10	Gary Bryan / Philip Hyde	Honda Baker	40:21.485	112.186
6	9	Conrad Harrison / Andrew Winkle	Honda Bellas	41:12.265	109.881
7	18	Gary Gibson / Tom Christie	Suzuki Shelbourn	41:23.893	109.367
8	34	Roger Stockton / Bradley Stockton	Suzuki LCR	43:06.02	105.048
9	22	Gordon Shand / Frank Claeys	Shand Suzuki	43:21.416	104.426
10	29	Bruce Moore / Ashley Moore	Honda Ireson	43:32.309	103.991

=== Supersport TT Race 1 ===
6 June 2022, 3 laps

Position	Number	Rider	Machine	Time	Speed (mph)
1	10	(Northern Ireland) Michael Dunlop	Yamaha	53:31.953	126.865
2	2	(England) Dean Harrison	Kawasaki	53:37.571	126.643
3	6	(England) Peter Hickman	Triumph	54:07.008	125.495
4	4	(Northern Ireland) Lee Johnston	Yamaha	54:10.555	125.358
5	1	(England) James Hillier	Yamaha	54:17.625	125.086
6	12	(England) Jamie Coward	Yamaha	54:34.848	124.428
7	5	(Isle of Man) Conor Cummins	Honda	54:38.641	124.284
8	22	(England) Davey Todd	Honda	55:10.529	123.087
9	19	(England) Dominic Herbertson	Kawasaki	55:31.858	122.299
10	16	(England) Ian Hutchinson	Yamaha	55:35.446	122.168

=== Superstock TT Race ===
6 June 2022, 3 laps

Position	Number	Rider	Machine	Time	Speed (mph)
1	10	(England) Peter Hickman	BMW	52:01.236	130.552
2	2	(Isle of Man) Conor Cummins	Honda	52:13.938	130.023
3	6	(England) Davey Todd	Honda	52:21.603	129.706
4	4	(England) Dean Harrison	Kawasaki	52:28.452	129.424
5	1	(Northern Ireland) Michael Dunlop	Honda	52:40.930	128.913
6	12	(England) Jamie Coward	Yamaha	52:59.395	128.164
7	5	(England) Ian Hutchinson	BMW	53:14.021	127.577
8	22	(England) Dominic Herbertson	BMW	53:37.764	126.636
9	19	(England) John McGuinness	Honda	53:45.285	126.340
10	16	(England) Philip Crowe	BMW	53:58.722	125.816

=== Supertwin TT Race ===
8 June 2022, 3 laps

Position	Number	Rider	Machine	Time	Speed (mph)
1	10	(England) Peter Hickman	Paton	56:35.517	120.006
2	2	(Northern Ireland) Lee Johnston	Aprilia	58:24.798	116.265
3	6	(Northern Ireland) Paul Jordan	Kawasaki	58:48.055	115.498
4	4	(France) Pierre Yves Bian	Paton	58:54.969	115.272
5	1	(England) Michael Rutter	Paton	59:00.969	115.077
6	12	(England) Rob Hodson	Kawasaki	59:02.572	115.025
7	5	(England) James Hind	Paton	59:09.553	114.799
8	22	(England) Dominic Herbertson	Kawasaki	59:18.285	114.517
9	19	(Isle of Man) Michael Evans	Kawasaki	59:52.787	113.417
10	16	(France) Xavier Denis	Kawasaki	01:00:19.788	112.571

=== Supersport TT Race 2 ===
10 June 2022, 2 laps

Position	Number	Rider	Machine	Time	Speed (mph)
1	10	(Northern Ireland) Michael Dunlop	Yamaha	35:29.154	127.589
2	2	(England) Peter Hickman	Triumph	35:32.452	127.391
3	6	(England) Dean Harrison	Kawasaki	36:11.366	126.129
4	4	(England) Davey Todd	Honda	36:17.827	125.108
5	1	(England) Jamie Coward	Yamaha	36:23.019	124.737
6	12	(Isle of Man) Conor Cummins	Honda	36:33.603	124.440
7	5	(England) James Hillier	Yamaha	36:41.569	123.840
8	22	(England) Dominic Herbertson	Kawasaki	36:58.086	123.392
9	19	(Republic of Ireland) Mike Browne	Yamaha	37:04.354	122.473
10	16	(Northern Ireland) Paul Jordan	Yamaha	37:05.721	122.128

=== Sidecar TT Race 2 ===
11 June 2022, the race was stopped after 1 lap due to the fatal accident of Roger and Bradley Stockton.

Position	Number	Rider	Machine	Time	Speed (mph)
1	1	(England) Ben Birchall / Tom Birchall	Honda LCR	19:16.699	117.427
2	7	Peter Founds / Jevan Walmsley	Honda LCR	19:19.012	117.193
3	5	(Isle of Man) Ryan Crowe / (Isle of Man) Callum Crowe	Honda LCR	19:21.676	116.924
4	4	(Isle of Man) Dave Molyneux / Daryl Gibson	DMR	20:09.119	112.336
5	10	Harry Payne / Mark Wilkes	Yamaha LCR	20:21.851	111.166
6	9	Lee Crawford / Scott Hardie	Suzuki LCR	20:22.553	111.102
7	18	Paul Leglise / Melanie Farnier	Suzuki Shelbourn	20:23.097	111.053
8	34	Gary Bryan / Philip Hyde	Suzuki LCR	20:27.787	110.628
9	22	Gary Gibson / Tom Christie	Shand Suzuki	20:45.529	109.052
10	29	Lewis Blackstock / Patrick Rosney	Honda Ireson	20:46.707	108.949

=== Senior TT Race ===
11 June 2022, 6 laps

Position	Number	Rider	Machine	Time	Speed (mph)
1	10	(England) Peter Hickman	BMW	01:44:56.494	129.432
2	2	(England) Dean Harrison	Kawasaki	01:45:13.412	129.085
3	6	(Isle of Man) Conor Cummins	Honda	01:45:30.099	128.745
4	4	(England) Davey Todd	Honda	01:45:32.926	128.687
5	1	(Northern Ireland) Michael Dunlop	Suzuki	01:47:15.918	126.628
6	12	(England) James Hillier	Yamaha	01:47:26.991	126.411
7	5	(England) Ian Hutchinson	BMW	01:48:01.669	125.734
8	22	(England) Jamie Coward	Yamaha	01:48:25.506	125.274
9	19	(England) John McGuinness	Honda	01:48:35.748	125.077
10	16	(Isle of Man) Nathan Harrison	Honda	01:49:30.139	124.041

== Wins table ==
	Rider	Wins
1	(England) Peter Hickman	4
2	(Northern Ireland) Michael Dunlop	2
2	(England) Ben Birchall	2
2	(England) Tom Birchall	2

== Bibliography ==
- "Island Racer 2022: The World's Biggest TT Bookazine". Island Racer. Mortons Media Group. 2022. SKU: 5421946 – via Kelsey Publishing.
