= 2019 Isle of Man TT =

Annual motorcycle racing event

2019 Isle of Man TT Races
- Isle of Man TT Mountain Course layout

Race details
- Date: 25 May – 7 June 2019
- Location: Douglas, Isle of Man
- Course: Isle of Man TT Mountain Course; 37.733 mi (60.725 km)

The 2019 Isle of Man TT was held between 25 May and 7 June, on the Isle of Man TT Mountain Course.

This year suffered from consistent inclement weather that affected the schedule and length of the races. The competitors only had two days of practice and only two were run at full length – the one-lap TT Zero and six-lap Dunlop Senior TT. This resulted in only one record being broken which was during the opening Sidecar race for Ben Birchall and Tom Birchall achieving a race time of 57:24.005 and race speed average of 118.317 mph (190.413 km/h).

This was the final year that the TT Zero event was held.

One competitor died during the opening RST Superbike race, Daley Mathison from England.

== Schedule ==
Monday 3 June	Thursday 6 June	Friday 7 June
RST Superbike	RL360 Superstock	Dunlop Senior TT
Supersport 1	Supersport 2	
Sidecar 1	Lightweight TT	
	TT Zero	
	Sidecar 2	

== Results ==
=== RST Superbike ===
The race was stopped following the fatal accident of Daley Mathison on lap 3.

Results (1–10)
Position	Number	Rider	Machine	Time	Speed (mph)
1	10	(England) Peter Hickman	BMW	34:08.008	132.644
2	2	(England) Dean Harrison	Kawasaki	34:09.790	132.529
3	1	(Isle of Man) Conor Cummins	Honda	34:17.353	132.042
4	5	(England) James Hillier	Kawasaki	34:49.727	129.996
5	8	(England) Michael Rutter	Honda	35:02.618	129.199
6	6	(Northern Ireland) Michael Dunlop	BMW	35:05.324	129.033
7	9	(Australia) David Johnson	Honda	35:18.153	128.251
8	15	(England) Jamie Coward	Yamaha	35:19.189	128.189
9	7	(England) Gary Johnson	Kawasaki	35:25.653	127.799
10	18	(England) Davey Todd	BMW	35:34.642	127.261

Results (11-52)
11	22	Brian McCormack	BMW	35:34.991	127.24
12	13	Sam West	BMW	35:36.826	127.131
13	4	Ian Hutchinson	Honda	35:47.078	126.524
14	14	Philip Crowe	BMW	35:58.345	125.863
15	11	Lee Johnston	BMW	36:00.526	125.736
16	16	Derek Sheils	Suzuki	36:07.841	125.312
17	20	Dominic Herbertson	Kawasaki	36:10.758	125.143
18	46	Paul Jordan	Kawasaki	36:16.791	124.797
19	23	Stefano Bonetti	BMW	36:20.487	124.585
20	17	Shaun Anderson	BMW	36:25.612	124.293
21	26	Rob Hodson	BMW	36:26.489	124.243
22	67	Jay Lawrence	Suzuki	36:35.267	123.746
23	49	Ryan Kneen	BMW	36:45.525	123.171
24	40	Horst Saiger	Yamaha	36:47.002	123.088
25	25	Michael Sweeney	BMW	36:54.986	122.645
26	31	Mike Booth	Kawasaki	37:02.901	122.208
27	60	Forest Dunn	Suzuki	37:06.693	122
28	30	Barry Lee Evans	Suzuki	37:15.987	121.493
29	50	David Jackson	BMW	37:24.201	121.048
30	56	Xavier Denis	Honda	18:29.713	122.399
31	57	James Chawke	Suzuki	18:33.928	121.936
32	29	Mark Parrett	BMW	18:38.474	121.44
33	36	Marc Ironside	Suzuki	18:39.288	121.352
34	55	Michael Russell	Suzuki	18:39.415	121.338
35	62	Richard Wilson	BMW	18:43.960	120.848
36	59	Richard Charlton	BMW	18:44.708	120.767
37	37	Matt Stevenson	BMW	18:55.492	119.62
38	54	Davy Morgan	BMW	18:55.722	119.596
39	34	Julian Trummer	Honda	18:56.564	119.508
40	52	Mark Goodings	Kawasaki	18:58.514	119.303
41	32	Raul Torras Martinez	Kawasaki	18:58.541	119.3
42	47	David Hewson	BMW	19:01.008	119.042
43	53	Adrian Harrison	Kawasaki	19:02.491	118.888
44	65	Jim Hodson	BMW	19:04.804	118.647
45	61	Josh Daley	Kawasaki	19:05.267	118.599
46	70	Lukas Maurer	Kawasaki	19:09.136	118.2
47	66	Anthony Redmond	Honda	19:12.503	117.855
48	58	Paul Williams	BMW	19:17.640	117.332
49	69	Thomas Maxwell	Kawasaki	19:17.896	117.306
50	38	Dean Osborne	Kawasaki	19:23.547	116.736
51	63	George Spence	Yamaha	19:23.812	116.71
52	44	Morgan Govignon	BMW	19:32.650	115.83
DNF	42	Barry Furber	Kawasaki	00.000	0
DNF	33	Frank Gallagher	Kawasaki	00.000	0
DNF	12	Derek McGee	Kawasaki	00.000	0
DNF	19	Daley Mathison	BMW	00.000	0
DNF	3	John McGuinness	Norton	00.000	0
DNF	64	Charles Rhys Hardisty	BMW	00.000	0
DNF	39	Joe Akroyd	Kawasaki	00.000	0
DNF	28	Daniel Cooper	BMW	00.000	0

=== Monster Energy Supersport 1 ===
Results (1–10)
Position	Number	Rider	Machine	Time	Speed (mph)
1	11	(Northern Ireland) Lee Johnston	Yamaha	35:48.337	126.449
2	5	(England) James Hillier	Kawasaki	35:51.978	126.235
3	10	(England) Peter Hickman	Triumph	35:53.304	126.158
4	2	(England) Dean Harrison	Kawasaki	36:06.308	125.400
5	6	(Northern Ireland) Michael Dunlop	Honda	36:09.462	125.218
6	1	(Isle of Man) Conor Cummins	Honda	36:15.922	124.846
7	7	(England) Gary Johnson	Triumph	36:17.425	124.760
8	15	(England) Jamie Coward	Yamaha	36:25.255	124.313
9	8	(England) Davey Todd	Honda	36:47.028	123.087
10	4	(England) Ian Hutchinson	Honda	36:55.133	122.636

Results (11-48)
Position	Number	Rider	Machine	Time	Speed (mph)
11	28	Derek Sheils	Yamaha	37:04.448	122.123
12	17	Paul Jordan	Kawasaki	37:21.557	121.191
13	20	Dominic Herbertson	Kawasaki	37:23.807	121.069
14	9	David Johnson	Honda	37:25.784	120.963
15	18	Michael Sweeney	Yamaha	37:37.017	120.361
16	13	Sam West	Yamaha	37:39.557	120.225
17	3	John McGuinness	Honda	37:40.818	120.158
18	44	Xavier Denis	Honda	37:51.291	119.604
19	22	Horst Saiger	Yamaha	37:54.815	119.419
20	41	Mike Browne	Kawasaki	38:03.093	118.986
21	31	Michal Dokoupil	Yamaha	38:23.515	117.931
22	27	Darren Cooper	Kawasaki	38:29.316	117.635
23	34	Adrian Harrison	Honda	38:32.665	117.464
24	39	Rob Hodson	Triumph	38:33.069	117.444
25	48	Frank Gallagher	Yamaha	38:42.999	116.942
26	26	Julian Trummer	Honda	38:49.146	116.633
27	50	Richard Charlton	Yamaha	38:53.533	116.414
28	45	Jim Hodson	Yamaha	38:55.003	116.341
29	35	Raul Torras Martinez	Yamaha	38:55.729	116.305
30	36	Mike Booth	Triumph	38:59.183	116.133
31	24	Tom Weeden	Yamaha	39:00.829	116.051
32	46	Mike Norbury	Honda	39:05.859	115.802
33	33	Davy Morgan	Kawasaki	39:13.077	115.447
34	57	Miroslav Sloboda	Yamaha	39:14.893	115.358
35	56	Robert Whittall	Suzuki	39:17.641	115.224
36	55	David Hewson	Kawasaki	39:20.254	115.096
37	75	Jonathan Perry	Honda	39:24.310	114.899
38	71	Raymond Casey	Kawasaki	39:32.137	114.52
39	59	Josh Daley	Kawasaki	39:34.680	114.397
40	37	Morgan Govignon	Kawasaki	39:37.158	114.278
41	63	Sam Johnson	Suzuki	39:37.319	114.27
42	58	Paul Williams	Yamaha	39:46.349	113.837
43	47	Dave Moffitt	Honda	40:28.977	111.84
44	68	Justin Collins	Yamaha	40:38.319	111.411
45	53	Richard Wilson	Honda	40:50.682	110.849
46	62	Matt Mylchreest	Kawasaki	40:53.042	110.742
47	67	Nicolas Pautet	Kawasaki	41:12.770	109.859
48	70	David Datzer	Suzuki	41:41.496	108.597
DNF	23	Philip Crowe	Yamaha	00.000	0
DNF	32	Timothee Monot	Yamaha	00.000	0
DNF	43	James Chawke	Kawasaki	00.000	0
DNF	64	Forest Dunn	Honda	00.000	0
DNF	72	Jonathan Goetschy	Yamaha	00.000	0
DNF	30	Mark Parrett	Yamaha	00.000	0
DNF	38	Matthew Rees	Kawasaki	00.000	0
DNF	54	Barry Furber	Honda	00.000	0
DNF	51	Charles Rhys Hardisty	Yamaha	00.000	0
DNF	69	Masayuki Yamanaka	Kawasaki	00.000	0
DNF	25	Barry Lee Evans	Suzuki	00.000	0
DNF	14	Daniel Cooper	Honda	00.000	0
DNF	29	Matt Stevenson	Yamaha	00.000	0
DNF	61	David Jackson	Yamaha	00.000	0
DNF	42	Brian McCormack	Yamaha	00.000	0
DNF	19	Daley Mathison	Yamaha	00.000	0
DNF	12	Derek McGee	Kawasaki	00.000	0
DNF	40	Joe Akroyd	Suzuki	00.000	0

=== Locate.im Sidecar 1 ===
Results (1-10)
Position	Number	Rider & Passenger	Machine	Time	Speed (mph)
1	1	Ben Birchall & Tom Birchall	LCR	57:24.005	118.317
2	2	John Holden & Lee Cain	Honda	58:12.121	116.687
3	4	Alan Founds & Jake Lowther	Yamaha	58:40.747	115.738
4	5	Pete Founds & Jevan Walmsley	Suzuki	58:46.319	115.555
5	44	Ryan Crowe & Callum Crowe	Triumph	01:00:01.526	113.142
6	6	Lewis Blackstock & Patrick Rosney	Honda	01:00:31.493	112.208
7	10	Gary Bryan & Philip Hyde	Baker	01:00:44.565	111.806
8	8	Conrad Harrison & Andrew Winkle	Honda	01:01:05.904	111.155
9	21	Allan Schofield & Steve Thomas	DDM	01:01:59.376	109.557
10	17	Gary Gibson & Daryl Gibson	Suzuki	01:02:38.874	108.406

Results (11-26)
Position	Number	Rider	Machine	Time	Speed (mph)
11	16	Darren Hope & Lenny Bumfrey	Suzuki	01:03:00.254	107.793
12	14	Wayne Lockey & Mark Sayers	Honda	01:03:41.457	106.631
13	19	John Lowther & Scott Hardie	Honda	01:03:45.164	106.527
14	25	Craig Melvin & Stuart Christian	Suzuki	01:04:06.246	105.943
15	33	Dan Knight & Matthew Rostron	Suzuki	01:04:12.545	105.77
16	20	Mick Alton & Stephen Bonney	LCR Suzuki	01:04:12.690	105.766
17	24	John Saunders & James Saunders	Shelbourne	01:05:14.994	104.083
18	35	Nicholas Dukes & William Moralee	Honda	01:06:08.392	102.682
19	39	Bruce Moore & Ashley Moore	Honda	01:06:23.076	102.304
20	28	Francois Leblond & Marlene Couillard	SGR Suzuki	01:06:28.751	102.158
21	45	Maria Costello & Julie Canipa	LCR	01:06:41.190	101.841
22	36	Dave Quirk & Karl Schofield	Ireson	01:08:34.325	99.04
23	9	Stephen Ramsden & Matty Ramsden	LCR	01:08:53.828	98.573
24	26	Terry O Reilly & Eamon Mulholland	LCR	01:09:21.417	97.92
25	43	Kevin Morgan & Steve Morgan	Yamaha	01:09:38.690	97.515
26	41	Nigel Smith & Chris McGahan	Honda	01:11:44.786	94.658
DNF	15	Michael Jackson & Sarah Stokoe	Suzuki	00.000	0
DNF	37	John Shipley & Andrew Haynes	LCR	00.000	0
DNF	3	Tim Reeves & Mark Wilkes	Yamaha	00.000	0
DNF	18	Robert Handcock & Ken Edwards	Baker	00.000	0
DNF	30	Roy Tansley & Shaun Parker	MR Equipe	00.000	0
DNF	27	Andy King & Alun Thomas	Lumley/Ireson	00.000	0
DNF	11	Estelle Leblond & Frank Claeys	SGR Suzuki	00.000	0
DNF	7	Dave Molyneux & Harry Payne	Yamaha	00.000	0
DNF	31	Darryl Rayner & Wendy Campbell	Shelbourne Honda	00.000	0
DNF	22	Gordon Shand & Kenny Cole	Shand	00.000	0
DNF	12	Gary Knight & Daniel Evanson	DMR Kawasaki	00.000	0
DNF	13	Greg Lambert & Ben McBride	GLR Honda	00.000	0
DNF	34	Kevin Thornton & David Hainsworth	Suzuki	00.000	0

=== RL360 Superstock ===
Results (1–10)
Position	Number	Rider	Machine	Time	Speed (mph)
1	10	(England) Peter Hickman	BMW	52:02.761	130.488
2	2	(England) Dean Harrison	Kawasaki	52:28.806	129.409
3	9	(Australia) David Johnson	Honda	52:42.648	128.843
4	6	(Northern Ireland) Michael Dunlop	BMW	52:42.856	128.834
5	1	(Isle of Man) Conor Cummins	Honda	52:52.004	128.463
6	8	(England) Michael Rutter	BMW	52:58.855	128.186
7	5	(England) James Hillier	Kawasaki	53:17.624	127.433
8	18	(England) Davey Todd	BMW	53:39.409	126.571
9	15	(England) Jamie Coward	Yamaha	53:42.541	126.448
10	7	(England) Gary Johnson	Kawasaki	53:45.811	126.320

Results (11-48)
Position	Number	Rider	Machine	Time	Speed (mph)
11	22	Brian McCormack	BMW	54:12.194	125.295
12	11	Lee Johnston	BMW	54:20.263	124.985
13	13	Sam West	BMW	54:25.426	124.787
14	46	Paul Jordan	Kawasaki	54:48.665	123.906
15	23	Stefano Bonetti	BMW	54:58.161	123.549
16	17	Shaun Anderson	BMW	55:06.187	123.249
17	67	Jay Lawrence	Suzuki	55:17.477	122.829
18	25	Michael Sweeney	BMW	55:27.048	122.476
19	56	Xavier Denis	Honda	55:33.051	122.256
20	29	Mark Parrett	BMW	55:56.365	121.406
21	26	Rob Hodson	BMW	55:58.419	121.332
22	60	Forest Dunn	Suzuki	56:02.909	121.17
23	57	James Chawke	Suzuki	56:02.942	121.169
24	31	Mike Booth	Kawasaki	56:04.850	121.1
25	33	Frank Gallagher	Kawasaki	56:10.460	120.899
26	50	David Jackson	BMW	56:23.245	120.442
27	40	Horst Saiger	Yamaha	56:23.730	120.425
28	49	Ryan Kneen	BMW	56:24.503	120.397
29	55	Michael Russell	Suzuki	56:28.738	120.247
30	62	Richard Wilson	BMW	56:39.915	119.851
31	47	David Hewson	BMW	56:47.045	119.6
32	39	Joe Akroyd	Kawasaki	57:03.850	119.013
33	34	Julian Trummer	Honda	57:14.715	118.637
34	54	Davy Morgan	BMW	57:20.703	118.43
35	36	Marc Ironside	Suzuki	57:24.183	118.311
36	59	Richard Charlton	BMW	57:26.755	118.223
37	48	Tom Weeden	Suzuki	57:29.634	118.124
38	70	Lukas Maurer	Kawasaki	57:38.436	117.823
39	63	George Spence	Yamaha	57:52.656	117.341
40	58	Paul Williams	BMW	57:54.456	117.28
41	52	Mark Goodings	Kawasaki	57:57.095	117.191
42	44	Morgan Govignon	BMW	58:07.420	116.844
43	61	Josh Daley	Kawasaki	58:20.330	116.413
44	66	Anthony Redmond	Honda	58:29.691	116.103
45	53	Adrian Harrison	Kawasaki	58:31.629	116.038
46	64	Charles Rhys Hardisty	BMW	58:37.300	115.851
47	42	Barry Furber	Kawasaki	58:52.445	115.355
48	45	Jonathan Perry	Kawasaki	59:10.997	114.752
DNF	38	Dean Osborne	Kawasaki	00.000	0
DNF	35	Timothee Monot	Kawasaki	00.000	0
DNF	32	Raul Torras Martinez	Kawasaki	00.000	0
DNF	20	Dominic Herbertson	Kawasaki	00.000	0
DNF	16	Derek Sheils	Suzuki	00.000	0
DNF	69	Thomas Maxwell	Kawasaki	00.000	0
DNF	14	Philip Crowe	BMW	00.000	0
DNF	65	Jim Hodson	BMW	00.000	0
DNF	28	Daniel Cooper	BMW	00.000	0
DNF	37	Matt Stevenson	BMW	00.000	0
DNF	4	Ian Hutchinson	Honda	00.000	0

=== Monster Energy Supersport 2 ===
Results (1-10)
Position	Number	Rider	Machine	Time	Speed (mph)
1	10	(England) Peter Hickman	Triumph	35:27.780	127.671
2	2	(England) Dean Harrison	Kawasaki	35:31.082	127.473
3	5	(England) James Hillier	Kawasaki	35:35.636	127.201
4	1	(Isle of Man) Conor Cummins	Honda	35:44.231	126.692
5	15	(England) Jamie Coward	Yamaha	35:48.778	126.423
6	6	(Northern Ireland) Michael Dunlop	Honda	36:10.408	125.164
7	8	(England) Davey Todd	Honda	36:10.903	125.135
8	7	(England) Gary Johnson	Triumph	36:12.192	125.061
9	11	(Northern Ireland) Lee Johnston	Yamaha	36:14.796	124.911
10	9	(Australia) David Johnson	Honda	36:35.130	123.754

Results (11-56)
Position	Number	Rider	Machine	Time	Speed (mph)
11	17	Paul Jordan	Kawasaki	36:44.426	123.232
12	28	Derek Sheils	Yamaha	36:48.343	123.013
13	13	Sam West	Yamaha	36:53.887	122.705
14	20	Dominic Herbertson	Kawasaki	36:58.057	122.475
15	3	John McGuinness	Honda	37:03.838	122.156
16	18	Michael Sweeney	Yamaha	37:21.743	121.181
17	22	Horst Saiger	Yamaha	37:23.663	121.077
18	41	Mike Browne	Kawasaki	37:26.736	120.911
19	44	Xavier Denis	Honda	37:51.035	119.618
20	43	James Chawke	Kawasaki	37:57.281	119.29
21	31	Michal Dokoupil	Yamaha	38:03.213	118.98
22	40	Joe Akroyd	Suzuki	38:12.681	118.488
23	23	Philip Crowe	Yamaha	38:12.820	118.481
24	24	Tom Weeden	Yamaha	38:13.799	118.431
25	39	Rob Hodson	Triumph	38:20.325	118.095
26	42	Brian McCormack	Yamaha	38:21.606	118.029
27	51	Charles Rhys Hardisty	Yamaha	38:27.544	117.725
28	36	Mike Booth	Triumph	38:31.663	117.515
29	26	Julian Trummer	Honda	38:31.851	117.506
30	27	Darren Cooper	Kawasaki	38:34.558	117.368
31	32	Timothee Monot	Yamaha	38:38.574	117.165
32	53	Richard Wilson	Honda	38:39.849	117.101
33	35	Raul Torras Martinez	Yamaha	38:42.872	116.948
34	34	Adrian Harrison	Honda	38:45.451	116.819
35	55	David Hewson	Kawasaki	38:48.762	116.653
36	46	Mike Norbury	Honda	38:51.212	116.53
37	59	Josh Daley	Kawasaki	38:56.459	116.268
38	50	Richard Charlton	Yamaha	38:59.474	116.118
39	48	Frank Gallagher	Yamaha	39:04.177	115.885
40	45	Jim Hodson	Yamaha	39:06.097	115.791
41	30	Mark Parrett	Yamaha	39:10.022	115.597
42	37	Morgan Govignon	Kawasaki	39:15.592	115.324
43	56	Robert Whittall	Suzuki	39:16.473	115.281
44	75	Jonathan Perry	Honda	39:26.230	114.805
45	69	Masayuki Yamanaka	Kawasaki	39:26.670	114.784
46	71	Raymond Casey	Kawasaki	39:32.597	114.497
47	47	Dave Moffitt	Honda	39:32.954	114.48
48	38	Matthew Rees	Kawasaki	39:41.609	114.064
49	57	Miroslav Sloboda	Yamaha	39:42.237	114.034
50	58	Paul Williams	Yamaha	39:43.096	113.993
51	62	Matt Mylchreest	Kawasaki	40:00.650	113.159
52	67	Nicolas Pautet	Kawasaki	40:09.760	112.732
53	72	Jonathan Goetschy	Yamaha	40:26.024	111.976
54	70	David Datzer	Suzuki	40:31.645	111.717
55	68	Justin Collins	Yamaha	41:01.367	110.368
56	64	Forest Dunn	Honda	44:08.458	102.571
DNF	29	Matt Stevenson	Yamaha	00.000	0
DNF	33	Davy Morgan	Kawasaki	00.000	0
DNF	4	Ian Hutchinson	Honda	00.000	0
DNF	63	Sam Johnson	Suzuki	00.000	0
DNF	14	Daniel Cooper	Honda	00.000	0
DNF	54	Barry Furber	Honda	00.000	0
DNF	61	David Jackson	Yamaha	00.000	0

=== Bennetts Lightweight ===
Results (1–10)
Position	Number	Rider	Machine	Time	Speed (mph)
1	6	(Northern Ireland) Michael Dunlop	Paton	37:13.161	121.646
2	15	(England) Jamie Coward	Kawasaki	37:14.460	121.576
3	9	(Northern Ireland) Lee Johnston	Kawasaki	37:37.151	120.353
4	12	(Northern Ireland) Paul Jordan	Kawasaki	37:42.426	120.073
5	8	(England) Michael Rutter	Kawasaki	37:47.367	119.811
6	4	(Italy) Stefano Bonetti	Paton	37:50.371	119.653
7	7	(England) Gary Johnson	Kawasaki	37:57.315	119.288
8	10	(England) Peter Hickman	Norton	38:02.743	119.004
9	20	(England) Dominic Herbertson	Kawasaki	38:36.735	117.258
10	14	(Austria) Horst Saiger	Paton	38:49.385	116.621

Results (11-31)
Position	Number	Rider	Machine	Time	Speed (mph)
11	18	James Chawke	Paton	39:03.074	115.94
12	11	Ian Lougher	Paton	39:19.577	115.129
13	17	John Barton	Kawasaki	39:41.670	114.061
14	25	Jonathan Perry	Kawasaki	39:45.615	113.873
15	26	Michal Dokoupil	Kawasaki	39:51.974	113.57
16	34	Shaun Anderson	Suzuki	40:04.407	112.983
17	32	Xavier Denis	Kawasaki	40:19.525	112.277
18	29	Jim Hodson	Kawasaki	40:25.924	111.98
19	40	Robert Whittall	Suzuki	40:36.674	111.486
20	27	Darren Cooper	Kawasaki	40:41.057	111.286
21	23	Barry Furber	Suzuki	40:47.407	110.997
22	33	Dave Moffitt	Kawasaki	40:59.834	110.437
23	48	Masayuki Yamanaka	Kawaski	41:05.297	110.192
24	37	Allann Venter	Kawasaki	41:17.414	109.653
25	35	Maria Costello	Paton	41:23.664	109.377
26	43	Anthony Redmond	Kawasaki	41:27.421	109.212
27	49	Dave Madsen-Mygdal	Kawasaki	41:38.877	108.711
28	39	Paul Williams	Kawasaki	41:42.037	108.574
29	46	Miroslav Sloboda	Kawasaki	41:58.187	107.878
30	47	Nicolas Pautet	Kawasaki	42:38.078	106.195
31	50	George Spence	Suzuki	42:59.547	105.312
DNF	3	John McGuinness	Norton	00.000	0
DNF	22	Rob Hodson	Kawasaki	00.000	0
DNF	2	Davey Todd	Norton	00.000	0
DNF	13	Michael Sweeney	Kawasaki	00.000	0
DNF	5	Daniel Cooper	Kawasaki	00.000	0

=== SES TT Zero ===
Results (1–7)
Position	Number	Rider	Manufacturer	Time	Speed
1	1	(England) Michael Rutter	Mugen	18:34.172	121.909
2	3	(England) John McGuinness	Mugen	18:42.738	120.979
3	6	(Wales) Ian Lougher	Idaten	22:02.697	102.69
4	5	(Wales) Matthew Rees	University of Bath	23:52.100	94.845
5	4	(South Africa) Allann Venter	Brunel	24:44.815	91.478
6	7	(England) Mike Norbury	Duffy	27:10.800	83.289
7	8	(Northern Ireland) Shaun Anderson	Duffy	31:25.831	72.026
DNF	10	(Wales) Alun Thomas	R&DE		
DNF	2	(England) Davey Todd	University of Nottingham		

=== Locate.im Sidecar 2 ===
Results (1–10)
Position	Number	Rider & Passenger	Manufacturer	Time	Speed
1	1	(England) Ben Birchall & (England) Tom Birchall	LCR	38:12.563	118.494
2	2	(England) John Holden & Lee Cain	Honda	38:33.074	117.444
3	5	Pete Founds & Jevan Walmsley	Suzuki	40:16.265	115.724
4	3	(England) Tim Reeves & Mark Wilkes	Yamaha	40:18.805	112.428
5	10	Gary Bryan & Phil Hyde	Baker	41:15.009	112.310
6	11	Estelle Leblond & Frank Claeys	SGR Suzuki	41:36.415	109.760
7	6	Lewis Blackstock & Patrick Rosney	Honda	41:37.731	108.818
8	21	Allan Schofield & Steve Thomas	DDM	41:42.336	108.761
9	19	John Lowther & Scott Hardie	Honda	41:43.136	108.561
10	7	(Isle of Man) Dave Molyneux & Harry Payne	Yamaha	41:44.470	108.526

=== Dunlop Senior ===
Results (1–10)
Position	Number	Rider	Machine	Time	Speed (mph)
1	2	(England) Dean Harrison	Kawasaki	01:43:49.521	130.824
2	10	(England) Peter Hickman	BMW	01:44:42.583	129.719
3	1	(Isle of Man) Conor Cummins	Honda	01:44:48.400	129.599
4	6	(Northern Ireland) Michael Dunlop	BMW	01:45:16.230	129.028
5	5	(England) James Hillier	Kawasaki	01:46:19.873	127.740
6	18	(England) Davey Todd	BMW	01:46:22.441	127.689
7	8	(England) Michael Rutter	Honda	01:46:53.092	127.079
8	15	(England) Jamie Coward	Yamaha	01:47:03.082	126.881
9	22	(Republic of Ireland) Brian McCormack	BMW	01:47:39.492	126.166
10	20	(England) Dominic Herbertson	Kawasaki	01:47:58.783	125.790

Results (11-34)
Position	Number	Rider	Machine	Time	Speed (mph)
11	7	Gary Johnson	Kawasaki	01:48:31.186	125.164
12	17	Shaun Anderson	BMW	01:49:48.261	123.7
13	16	Derek Sheils	Suzuki	01:49:57.265	123.531
14	31	Mike Booth	Kawasaki	01:50:44.891	122.646
15	25	Michael Sweeney	BMW	01:51:03.728	122.299
16	40	Horst Saiger	Yamaha	01:51:04.879	122.278
17	29	Mark Parrett	BMW	01:51:45.117	121.544
18	39	Joe Akroyd	Kawasaki	01:51:50.223	121.452
19	50	David Jackson	BMW	01:51:52.831	121.405
20	33	Frank Gallagher	Kawasaki	01:51:54.645	121.372
21	34	Julian Trummer	Honda	01:52:22.962	120.862
22	36	Marc Ironside	Suzuki	01:52:29.738	120.741
23	67	Jay Lawrence	Suzuki	01:52:34.243	120.66
24	55	Michael Russell	Suzuki	01:52:56.626	120.262
25	47	David Hewson	BMW	01:53:16.831	119.904
26	48	Tom Weeden	Suzuki	01:53:19.540	119.856
27	62	Richard Wilson	BMW	01:53:37.304	119.544
28	52	Mark Goodings	Kawasaki	01:54:08.276	119.003
29	70	Lukas Maurer	Kawasaki	01:54:28.653	118.65
30	61	Josh Daley	Kawasaki	01:54:55.625	118.186
31	53	Adrian Harrison	Kawasaki	01:55:07.603	117.981
32	44	Morgan Govignon	BMW	01:55:49.639	117.268
33	63	George Spence	Yamaha	01:56:00.856	117.079
34	42	Barry Furber	Kawasaki	01:56:10.361	116.919
DNF	13	Sam West	BMW	00.000	0
DNF	3	John McGuinness	Norton	00.000	0
DNF	54	Davy Morgan	BMW	00.000	0
DNF	64	Charles Rhys Hardisty	BMW	00.000	0
DNF	4	Ian Hutchinson	Honda	00.000	0
DNF	60	Forest Dunn	Suzuki	00.000	0
DNF	46	Paul Jordan	Kawasaki	00.000	0
DNF	57	James Chawke	Suzuki	00.000	0
DNF	14	Philip Crowe	BMW	00.000	0
DNF	56	Xavier Denis	Honda	00.000	0
DNF	58	Paul Williams	BMW	00.000	0
DNF	23	Stefano Bonetti	BMW	00.000	0
DNF	9	David Johnson	Honda	00.000	0
DNF	35	Timothee Monot	Kawasaki	00.000	0
DNF	66	Anthony Redmond	Honda	00.000	0
DNF	26	Rob Hodson	BMW	00.000	0
DNF	32	Raul Torras Martinez	Kawasaki	00.000	0
DNF	65	Jim Hodson	BMW	00.000	0
DNF	49	Ryan Kneen	BMW	00.000	0
DNF	69	Thomas Maxwell	Kawasaki	00.000	0
DNF	45	Jonathan Perry	Kawasaki	00.000	0

== Wins table ==
	Rider	Wins
1	(England) Peter Hickman	3
2	(England) Ben Birchall	2
2	(England) Tom Birchall	2
4	(Northern Ireland) Lee Johnston	1
4	(Northern Ireland) Michael Dunlop	1
4	(England) Michael Rutter	1
4	(England) Dean Harrison	1

== Bibliography ==
- "Island Racer 2019: Ultimate Guide to This Year's Isle of Man TT Races". Island Racer. Mortons Media Group. 2019. SKU: 4402165 – via Kelsey Publishing.
