= Dean Harrison =

English motorcycle road racer

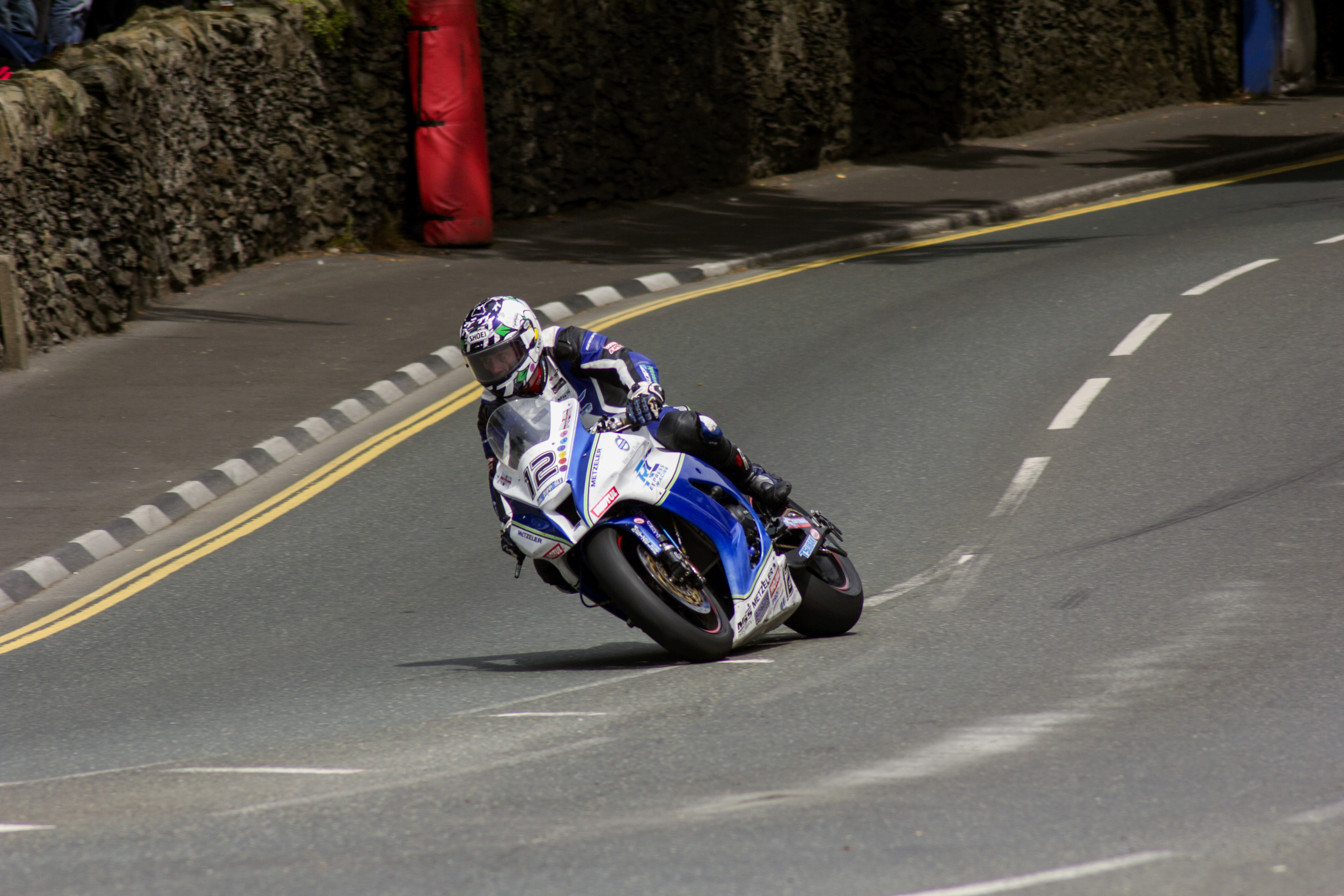
- Harrison approaching Quarter Bridge during the 2014 Isle of Man TT
- Nationality: British
- Born: Dean Conrad Harrison; 24 January 1989 (age 37); Bradford, West Yorkshire, England
- Current team: Honda Racing UK
- Bike number: 3
Motorcycle racing career statistics
Isle of Man TT career
TTs contested	14 (2011-present)
TT wins	7
First TT win	2014 Lightweight TT Race
Last TT win	2026 Senior TT
TT podiums	38

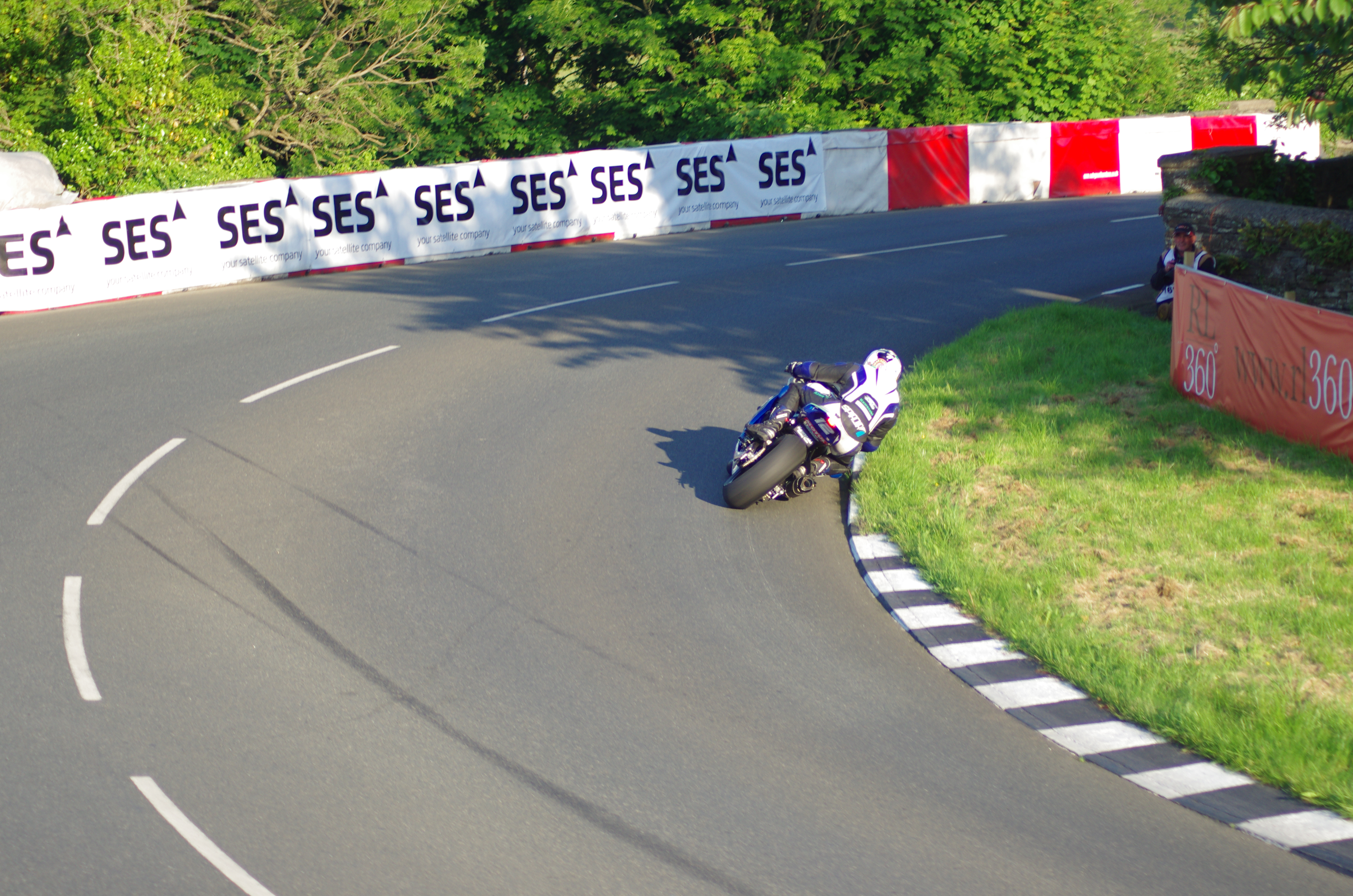
Harrison at Sulby Bridge during TT practice in May 2014

Dean Conrad Harrison (born 24 January 1989) is an English professional motorcycle racer. He has won seven Isle of Man TT races and has 38 podium finishes as of early June 2026.

Harrison also competes in the North West 200, Southern 100 and Oliver's Mount road-circuit races and British Superbike Championship. He also topped the Duke Road Racing Rankings in 2016 and 2017 to win those championships and lift the Geoff Duke Trophy.

== Racing career ==
Harrison was 18 years old when he began motorcycle racing.

Harrison has won the Isle of Man TT 5 times: the Lightweight TT in 2014, the Supersport TT in 2018, the Senior TT in 2019 and both Superstock TT races in 2025. His best lap was 134.9 mph, then the second-fastest ever. He also earned four Classic TT wins between 2014 and 2019. Harrison holds the Superbike TT lap record of 16:50.384, set in 2018 with his Kawasaki ZX 10R.

Harrison is the third most successful rider in the Southern 100 event's 65-year history, with 24 solo wins culminating in three solo championship wins between 2017 and 2019. Harrison has earned 68 solo wins at the Oliver's Mount racing circuit, had four podium finishes in the North West 200, and two wins at the Ulster GP, holding a Superstock record of 133.835 mph as of 2023.

Harrison left DAO Racing, the team he raced with for eight years, at the end of 2023. On 15 November 2023, it was announced that Harrison would ride for Honda Racing UK on the roads and in the British championship from 2024.

== Personal life ==
Harrison was born in Bradford, England. He is married and has two children. His father, Conrad Harrison, is a former TT competitor who won a Sidecar TT Race in 2014.

From 2024, Harrison is based in Laxey, Isle of Man.

== Full TT results ==
2026	Superbike TT 1	Supersport TT 1 2	Supersport TT 2 2	Superstock TT 1 Cancelled	Superstock TT 2 Cancelled	Senior TT 1		
2025	Superbike TT 3	Superstock TT 1	Supersport TT 2	Superstock TT 1	Senior TT Cancelled			
2024	Superbike TT 3	Superstock TT 1 4	Supersport TT 1 3	Supersport TT 2 2	Senior TT 3			
2023	Superbike TT 3	Superstock TT 1 3	Supersport TT 1 3	Supersport TT 2 3	Senior TT 2			Superstock TT 2 3
2022	Superbike TT 2	Superstock TT 4	Supersport TT 1 2	Supersport TT 2 3	Senior TT 2			
2019	Superbike TT 2	Superstock TT 2	Supersport TT 1 4	Supersport TT 2 2	Senior TT 1			
2018	Superbike TT DNF	Superstock TT 3	Supersport TT 1 2	Supersport TT 2 1	Senior TT 2			
2017	Superbike TT 3	Superstock TT 5	Supersport TT 1 DNF	Supersport TT 2 Cancelled	Senior TT 3		TT Zero 4	
2016	Superbike TT 5	Superstock TT 2	Supersport TT 1 2	Supersport TT 2 3	Senior TT 4			
2015	Superbike TT 31	Superstock TT 13	Supersport TT 1 DNF	Supersport TT 2 DNF	Senior TT 11			
2014	Superbike TT 8	Superstock TT 1 2	Supersport TT 4	Supersport TT 2 4	Senior TT DNF	Lightweight TT 1		
2013	Superbike TT 11	Superstock TT 4	Supersport TT 1 7	Supersport TT 2 8	Senior TT 8	Lightweight TT 2		
2012	Superbike TT 9	Superstock TT DNF	Supersport TT 1 DNF	Supersport TT 2 13	Senior TT Cancelled	Lightweight TT 12		
2011	Superbike TT DNF	Superstock TT 27	Supersport TT 1 25	Supersport TT 2 12	Senior TT DNF			

== British Superbike Championship ==
(key) (Races in bold indicate pole position; races in italics indicate fastest lap)

Year	Make	1		2		3			4		5		6			7		8			9			10		11		12			Pos	Pts
Year	Make	R1	R2	R1	R2	R1	R2	R3	R1	R2	R1	R2	R1	R2	R3	R1	R2	R1	R2	R3	R1	R2	R3	R1	R2	R1	R2	R1	R2	R3	Pos	Pts
2017	Kawasaki	DON	DON	BHI	BHI	OUL	OUL		KNO	KNO	SNE	SNE	BHGP	BHGP		THR	THR	CAD	CAD		SIL; Ret	SIL; 16	SIL; Ret	OUL; 16	OUL; 17	ASS; 12	ASS; Ret	BHGP; 16	BHGP; Ret	BHGP; 23	NC	0
2018	Kawasaki	DON; 21	DON; Ret	BHI	BHI	OUL; 17	OUL; 18		SNE	SNE	KNO	KNO	BHGP; 17	BHGP; 20		THR	THR	CAD	CAD		SIL; 19	SIL; 17	SIL; Ret	OUL; Ret	OUL; 12	ASS; 19	ASS; 12	BHGP; 14	BHGP; Ret	BHGP; Ret	24th	10

Year	Bike	1		2		3			4		5		6		7		8		9			10		11		12			Pos	Pts
Year	Bike	R1	R2	R1	R2	R1	R2	R3	R1	R2	R1	R2	R1	R2	R1	R2	R1	R2	R1	R2	R3	R1	R2	R1	R2	R1	R2	R3	Pos	Pts
2019	Kawasaki	SIL; Ret	SIL; Ret	OUL; 12	OUL; 18	DON	DON	DON	BRH	BRH	KNO; 17	KNO; Ret	SNE; 18	SNE; 18	THR	THR	CAD; 15	CAD; 13	OUL	OUL	OUL	ASS	ASS	DON; 22	DON; 22	BHGP; 18	BHGP; 18	BHGP; Ret	26th	8

Year	Bike	1			2			3			4			5			6			7			8			9			10			11			Pos	Pts
Year	Bike	R1	R2	R3	R1	R2	R3	R1	R2	R3	R1	R2	R3	R1	R2	R3	R1	R2	R3	R1	R2	R3	R1	R2	R3	R1	R2	R3	R1	R2	R3	R1	R2	R3	Pos	Pts
2021	Kawasaki	OUL; 14	OUL; 17	OUL; Ret	KNO	KNO	KNO	BHGP; 17	BHGP; 19	BHGP; 14	THR; 18	THR; 17	THR; 17	DON; 20	DON; 13	DON; 8	CAD; Ret	CAD; 14	CAD; 16	SNE; 18	SNE; 17	SNE; 16	SIL; 16	SIL; 20	SIL; 21	OUL; 14	OUL; 12	OUL; 13	DON; Ret	DON; Ret	DON; 19	BHGP; Ret	BHGP; Ret	BHGP; 14	21st	28
2022	Kawasaki	SIL; 22	SIL; Ret	SIL; DNS	OUL; 23	OUL; 17	OUL; 16	DON	DON	DON	KNO; 22	KNO; 17	KNO; 18	BRH; Ret	BRH; 18	BRH; 19	THR; 22	THR; 17	THR; Ret	CAD; 16	CAD; 18	CAD; 18	SNE; Ret	SNE; Ret	SNE; 15	OUL; 14	OUL; Ret	OUL; 15	DON; 21	DON; 18	DON; Ret	BRH; 16	BRH; 12	BRH; Ret	25th	8
2023	Kawasaki	SIL; 15	SIL; 20	SIL; 19	OUL; 17	OUL; 10	OUL; 12	DON; Ret	DON; DNS	DON; DNS	KNO; 12	KNO; 12	KNO; 10	SNE; 15	SNE; Ret	SNE; 16	BRH; 16	BRH; Ret	BRH; 17	THR; 22	THR; Ret	THR; 20	CAD	CAD	CAD	OUL	OUL	OUL	DON	DON	DON	BRH	BRH	BRH	21st	26
2024	Honda	NAV; 18	NAV; Ret		OUL; 15	OUL; DNS	OUL; 16	DON; 17	DON; 11	DON; 13	KNO; 19	KNO; 17	KNO; Ret	SNE; 11	SNE; 19	SNE; 17	BRH; 16	BRH; 18	BRH; 19	THR	THR	THR	CAD	CAD	CAD	OUL	OUL	OUL	DON	DON	DON	BRH	BRH	BRH	23rd	14

=== British Supersport Championship ===
(key) (Races in bold indicate pole position; races in italics indicate fastest lap)

Year	Bike	1	2	3	4	5	6	7	8	9	10	11	12	13	14	15	16	17	18	19	20	21	22	Pos	Pts
2023	Yamaha	SLV	SLV	OPK	OPK	DPK	DPK	KNH	KNH	STN	STN	BRH	BRH	TXN	TXN	CPK	CPK	OPK; 6	OPK; 4	DPK; 12	DPK; 9	BRH; 19	BRH; 7	15th	65
