= Conor Cummins =

Manx motorcycle racer (born 1986)

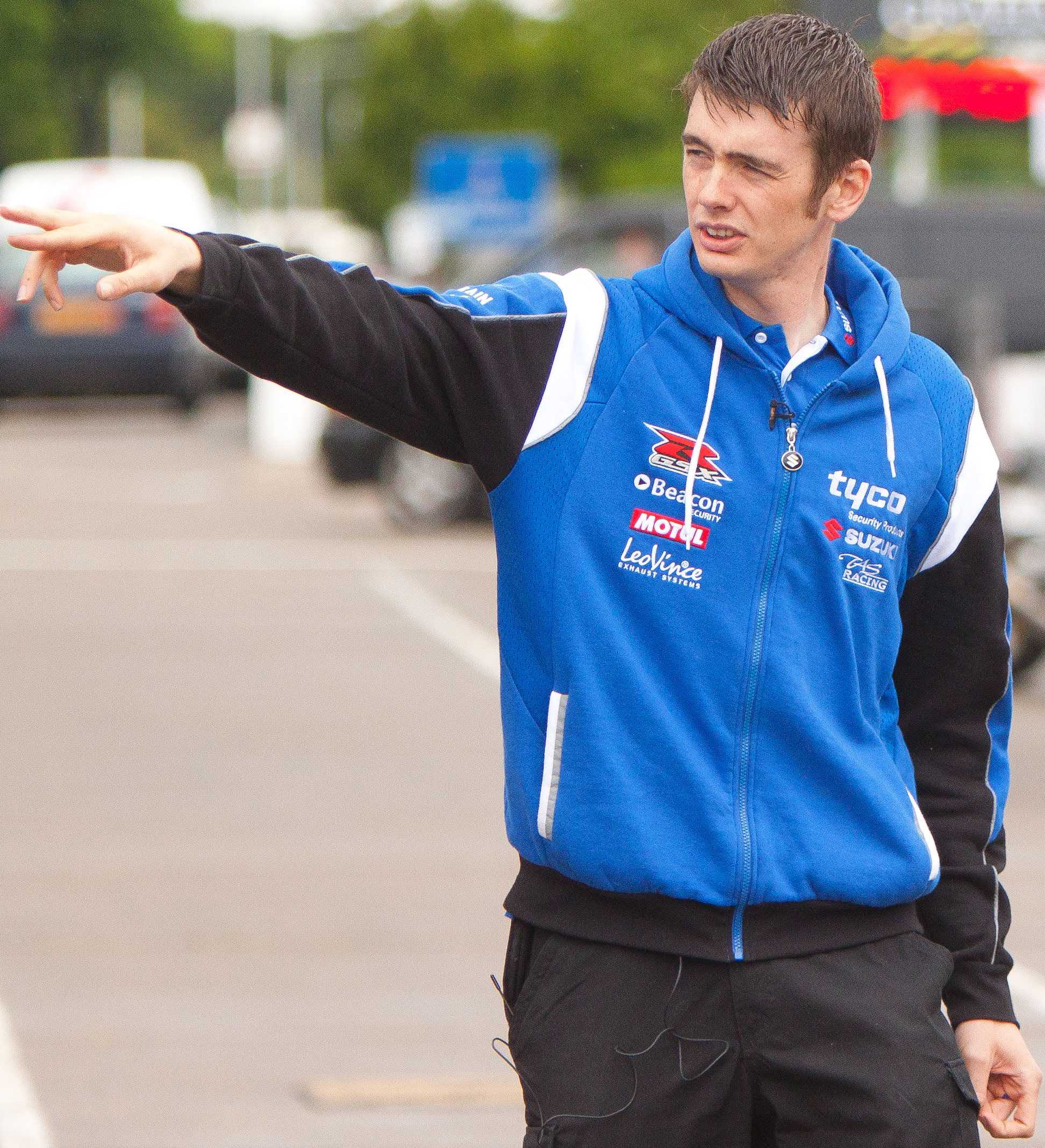
- Cummins in 2012
- Nationality: Manx
- Born: 27 May 1986 (age 40); Douglas, Isle of Man
Motorcycle racing career statistics
Isle of Man TT career
TTs contested	16 (2006 – present)
TT wins	0
First TT win	–
Last TT win	–
TT podiums	12

Conor Cummins (born 27 May 1986), also known by his nicknames, "the Ramsey Rocket" or "Conrod", is a Manx motorcycle road racer who rides in British racing events, competing in the British Superstock Championship, as well as in specialist closed-road events at his home Isle of Man TT races and in Northern Ireland. A part-time seasonal racer, his normal income is derived from his business as a barista and coffeemaker supplier.

Cummins currently competes aboard a Honda CBR1000RR and a Honda CBR600RR. He was born during TT week in 1986, and became a professional rider in 2006. His father William 'Billy' Cummins contested the TT and Manx Grand Prix events and is still road racing.

== Early career ==
Cummins was born in Douglas, Isle of Man, and began his career riding in the British Championship and the Virgin Mobile Yamaha R6 Cup. However, the lack of opportunities in these competitions led him to decide to make the switch to road racing. 'The more I raced I realised it was time to switch over to pure roads and it's a decision I've not regretted once', he commented.

== Road racing ==
=== 2006 ===
Cummins picked up awards as the Fastest Newcomer at the North West 200, the Southern 100 and the Isle of Man TT. Cummins also won the Newcomers Race at the Ulster Grand Prix.

=== 2007 ===
In 2007, Cummins became both Irish Superbike Road Race Champion and Irish Superstock Road Race Champion in a season that saw him record 13 Irish National Road Race wins. He finished second in two races at the Ulster Grand Prix as well as scoring a podium finish in the British Superbike Cup riding as a wildcard at Donington. At the Isle of Man TT, he produced a series of performances to record four top-eight finishes including two fifth places. During the Superstock Race, Cummins claimed the record for the fastest local Isle of Man competitor after lapping at 18 minutes and 10.78 seconds from a standing start on lap 1, and would claim the Geoff Duke Trophy as the Duke Road Racing Rankings Champion.

=== 2008 ===
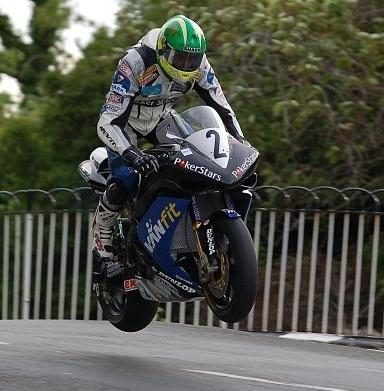
Cummins at Ballaugh Bridge in 2008

For 2008, Cummins rode for Team VanFit Yamaha in the British Superstock Championship, starting with a third place at Oulton Park. He also rode at the North West 200 but mechanical problems destroyed any hopes of a podium finish. He then rode in the Isle of Man TT and claimed a fifth place in the Superstock on Monday 2 June before recording a seventh place in the Supersport Junior TT on Wednesday 4 June. It was a good result for Cummins in another week plagued by mechanical problems where he was forced to retire in the Senior and Supersport Race 1. On 20 August, it was announced that he had parted company with the Vanfit team and would miss the final four rounds of the British Superstock Championship.

=== 2009–2011: McAdoo Kawasaki and 2010 Senior TT accident ===
Cummins signed a deal with Cookstown-based McAdoo Kawasaki Racing for 2009's international road racing season. Cummins recorded his first Isle of Man TT podium on 10 June 2009, when he finished third in the second Supersport Junior TT race, behind Michael Dunlop and Bruce Anstey. Two days later, he went one place better, finishing second in the Senior TT, 19.54 seconds behind race winner Steve Plater. Cummins also became the first ever Manxman to record an average lap speed of over 130 mph on his third lap of the Senior TT with a speed of 130.22 mph. Cummins also recorded top-ten finishes in the first Supersport Junior TT race and the Superstock race.

On 13 August, Cummins won the Dundrod 150 Superbike race, part of the Ulster Grand Prix Bike week. After a race-long duel with Guy Martin, Ian Hutchinson and Ryan Farquhar, a final lap of 133.284 mph on the McAdoo Kawasaki saw him take the win and shatter the lap record. He then took his first international road race victory when he won the feature Ulster Grand Prix Superbike race. 2010 had brought a mixed year for Conor with a great start to the TT on his Macadoo Kawasaki and a good NW200 but it all ended with a crash at the senior TT. He sustained a badly broken left arm, two bone fractures in his back, a dislocated knee and ligament damage, bruising to his lungs and a hairline fracture to his pelvis in the spill before being airlifted to Nobles Hospital. The crash occurred on the second lap of the Senior race, which had been restarted, coincidentally, after a heavy crash involving Cummins' good friend Guy Martin, who escaped serious injury. In the restart, a lap of 131.123 mph saw Cummins slot into third place just over two seconds off the race lead. By Ramsey on lap two, he was up to second and only three seconds adrift of race leader Ian Hutchinson only for his crash to occur a few miles later on the high speed right hand bends at the Verandah.

It had been a mixed race week for Cummins prior to Senior race day with both highs and lows in his previous four races on the McAdoo Racing Kawasakis. The low came in the opening Superbike race which he seemingly had in the bag. Two laps in excess of 131 mph, including a stunning opening lap of 131.511 mph (the second fastest of all time and just a fraction outside the outright lap record), helped him seize control and with a lead of over 20 seconds, everything was looking good for his debut TT win. However, the machine refused to fire after his second pit stop and he saw his lead reduced to just four seconds but he then reluctantly had to retire on the fifth lap at Laurel Bank with engine problems. The Superstock race saw Cummins have his best result of the week as he took his third TT podium with an excellent third place, a best lap of 129.309 mph helping him move up to third place on the second lap, a position he maintained until the chequered flag. In the two Supersport races, he took eighth in the first four-lapper and followed this up with a sixth in the second, 0.23 s behind John McGuinness, also recording his first 125 mph+ lap in the class. He continued his recover from injury throughout the 2011 season. He was a consistent finisher in the British Superstock Championship and recorded a 6th-place finish in the 2nd Supersport Isle of Man TT race.

=== 2012 ===
Cummins signed to ride for the factory TAS Tyco Suzuki Team in 2012 along with team-mate Guy Martin. He received an injured wrist during the North West 200 Superbike race, and this meant that his campaign at the 2012 Isle of Man TT had to be reviewed. As he entered the chicane at Mather's Cross, he was struck by Gary Johnson and the resulting collision also included Martin Jessop - who suffered a broken collarbone. As a consequence of the injury sustained to his wrist, he was only able to practice periodically for the TT. On medical advice, he withdrew from the week's opening Superbike race, together with further races during the week, in the hope that he would be passed fit to compete in the Senior TT which was scheduled for Friday 8 June. Due to adverse weather, the Senior race was postponed until Saturday 9 June, but again the effects of the previous day's rain meant that the Senior TT was eventually cancelled - the first time the race has been cancelled due to weather in its 105-year history. Therefore, Cummins did not compete in any of the races at the 2012 Isle of Man TT.

=== 2013: Milwaukee Yamaha ===
Cummins finished third in the Lightweight TT Race, riding a KMR Kawasaki prepared by fellow racer Ryan Farquhar.

=== 2016–2024: Padgetts Honda ===
In May 2016, Cummins announced his switch from long-term, Preston-based sponsor Jackson Racing to Batley-based team Padgett's Racing for the Supersport 600 and Superstock classes at the 2016 Isle of Man TT. The decision was taken at short notice and is reported to have followed a disappointing Supersport race at the earlier North West 200. Padgetts Motorcycles sold Cummins his first ever race bike, a pre-owned Honda RS125. Conor joins rider Bruce Anstey at Padgetts, a long-term family-owned motorcycle dealership and race sponsor. Cummins will continue to campaign the Honda CBR1000RR Fireblade SP in the Superbike and Senior TT races with the Honda Racing UK factory team.

Cummins announced on social media that he would withdraw from the 2024 Isle of Man TT, and would part ways with Padgetts Honda.

== Coffee business ==
Cummins opened his own coffee shop named Conrod's in Ramsey in 2018. It closed down in 2023. However, he still owns a coffee machine and coffee grinder supplying business called Coffee Mann.

== TT3D Closer to the Edge ==
TT3D: Closer to the Edge is a documentary film about the 2010 Isle of Man TT races. The film examines what motivates the riders who race the TT and risk everything to become "King of the Mountain". Filmed in 3D, the film is a story about freedom of choice and the strength of human spirit. The film follows the leading riders in the 2010 race meeting, including Cummins.

== Career statistics ==
- 2009 - NC, FIM Superstock 1000 Cup, Yamaha YZF-R1

=== FIM Superstock 1000 Cup ===
==== Races by year ====
(key) (Races in bold indicate pole position) (Races in italics indicate fastest lap)

Year	Bike	1	2	3	4	5	6	7	8	9	10	Pos	Pts
2009	Yamaha	VAL	NED	MNZ	SMR	DON; 18	BRN	NŰR	IMO	MAG	ALG	NC	0

=== British Superbike Championship ===
==== Races by year ====
(key) (Races in bold indicate pole position; races in italics indicate fastest lap)

Year	Make	1		2		3			4		5		6			7		8			9			10		11		12			Pos	Pts
Year	Make	R1	R2	R1	R2	R1	R2	R3	R1	R2	R1	R2	R1	R2	R3	R1	R2	R1	R2	R3	R1	R2	R3	R1	R2	R1	R2	R1	R2	R3	Pos	Pts
2018	Honda	DON; 25	DON; 20	BHI	BHI	OUL; 21	OUL; 21		SNE	SNE	KNO	KNO	BHGP	BHGP		THR	THR	CAD	CAD		SIL	SIL	SIL	OUL	OUL	ASS	ASS	BHGP	BHGP	BHGP	NC	0

Year	Bike	1		2		3			4		5		6		7		8		9			10		11		12			Pos	Pts
Year	Bike	R1	R2	R1	R2	R1	R2	R3	R1	R2	R1	R2	R1	R2	R1	R2	R1	R2	R1	R2	R3	R1	R2	R1	R2	R1	R2	R3	Pos	Pts
2019	Honda	SIL; 24	SIL; Ret	OUL	OUL	DON	DON	DON	BRH	BRH	KNO	KNO	SNE	SNE	THR	THR	CAD	CAD	OUL	OUL	OUL	ASS	ASS	DON	DON	BHGP	BHGP	BHGP	NC	0

Year	Bike	1			2			3			4			5			6			7			8			9			10			11			Pos	Pts
Year	Bike	R1	R2	R3	R1	R2	R3	R1	R2	R3	R1	R2	R3	R1	R2	R3	R1	R2	R3	R1	R2	R3	R1	R2	R3	R1	R2	R3	R1	R2	R3	R1	R2	R3	Pos	Pts
2022	Ducati	SIL	SIL	SIL	OUL; 29	OUL; Ret	OUL; DNS	DON	DON	DON	KNO	KNO	KNO	BRH	BRH	BRH	THR	THR	THR	CAD	CAD	CAD	SNE	SNE	SNE	OUL	OUL	OUL	DON	DON	DON	BRH	BRH	BRH	NC	0
