= Dan Kneen =

Manx motorcycle racer (1987–2018)

- Nationality: Manx
- Born: Daniel Richard Kneen; 26 June 1987; Douglas, Isle of Man
- Died: 30 May 2018 (aged 30); Churchtown, Isle of Man
- Website: Dan Kneen (archived)
Motorcycle racing career statistics
British Superbike Championship
Active years	2011
Manufacturers	Kawasaki
Championships	0
2011 championship position	34th
Starts / Wins / Podiums / Poles / F. laps / Points; 14 / 0 / 0 / 0 / 0 / 3
Isle of Man TT career
TTs contested	9 (2009–2015, 2017–2018)
TT wins	0
TT podiums	1

Daniel Richard Kneen (26 June 1987 – 30 May 2018) was a professional motorcycle racer from Douglas, Isle of Man.

Kneen was a race winner at the Manx Grand Prix (three times) and the Ulster Grand Prix, and finished on the podium at the 2017 Isle of Man TT, in the Superstock race. Kneen died of multiple injuries after an accident during qualifying for the 2018 Isle of Man TT, the 147th competitor to be killed at the Mountain Course during a TT meeting.

== Racing history ==
=== Marks Bloom Racing ===
In 2008, Kneen became the first rider to win a hat-trick at the Manx Grand Prix. He was fourth in the 2009 Metzeler National Superstock 600 cc Championship, winning a race at Oulton Park. Also in 2009, Kneen made his bow at the Isle of Man TT with the Marks Bloom Racing team, taking a top-ten finish in the Superstock TT. The following year, Kneen acquired financial support from Manx Gas ahead of the 2010 Isle of Man TT, continuing with the Marks Bloom Racing outfit. At the event, Kneen took three top-ten finishes, including his first top-five result with a fifth-place finish in the first Supersport Junior TT race, 48 seconds down on race winner Ian Hutchinson. Kneen was also the fastest newcomer at August's Ulster Grand Prix, lapping at 129.254 mph (208.014 km/h) during the first Superbike race. On the short-circuits, Kneen finished second in the 2010 British Supersport Championship's privateers' championship, winning at Thruxton and Croft. After the championship had ended, Kneen then made his début at the Macau Grand Prix in November, where he finished 14th.

Alongside his road racing commitments, for the 2011 season, Kneen moved into the Evolution Cup class of the British Superbike Championship, riding a Kawasaki Ninja ZX-10R for Marks Bloom Racing. Kneen missed much of the early BSB campaign due to injuries sustained from an accident at RAF Jurby, returning at the North West 200 road races; racing at that event was ultimately cut short due to bad weather. Kneen scored class points in eight races with a best finish of fourth at Brands Hatch, as he finished twelfth in the final Evolution Cup standings. Kneen's fourth place class finish – thirteenth place overall – also allowed him to score three points towards the overall British Superbike Championship. At the Isle of Man TT, Kneen took top-ten placings in the first Supersport race (sixth) and the Superstock race (seventh). On his way to finishing 12th in the Senior TT, Kneen had a high-speed tank-slapper on the exit of the Rhencullen section of the circuit.

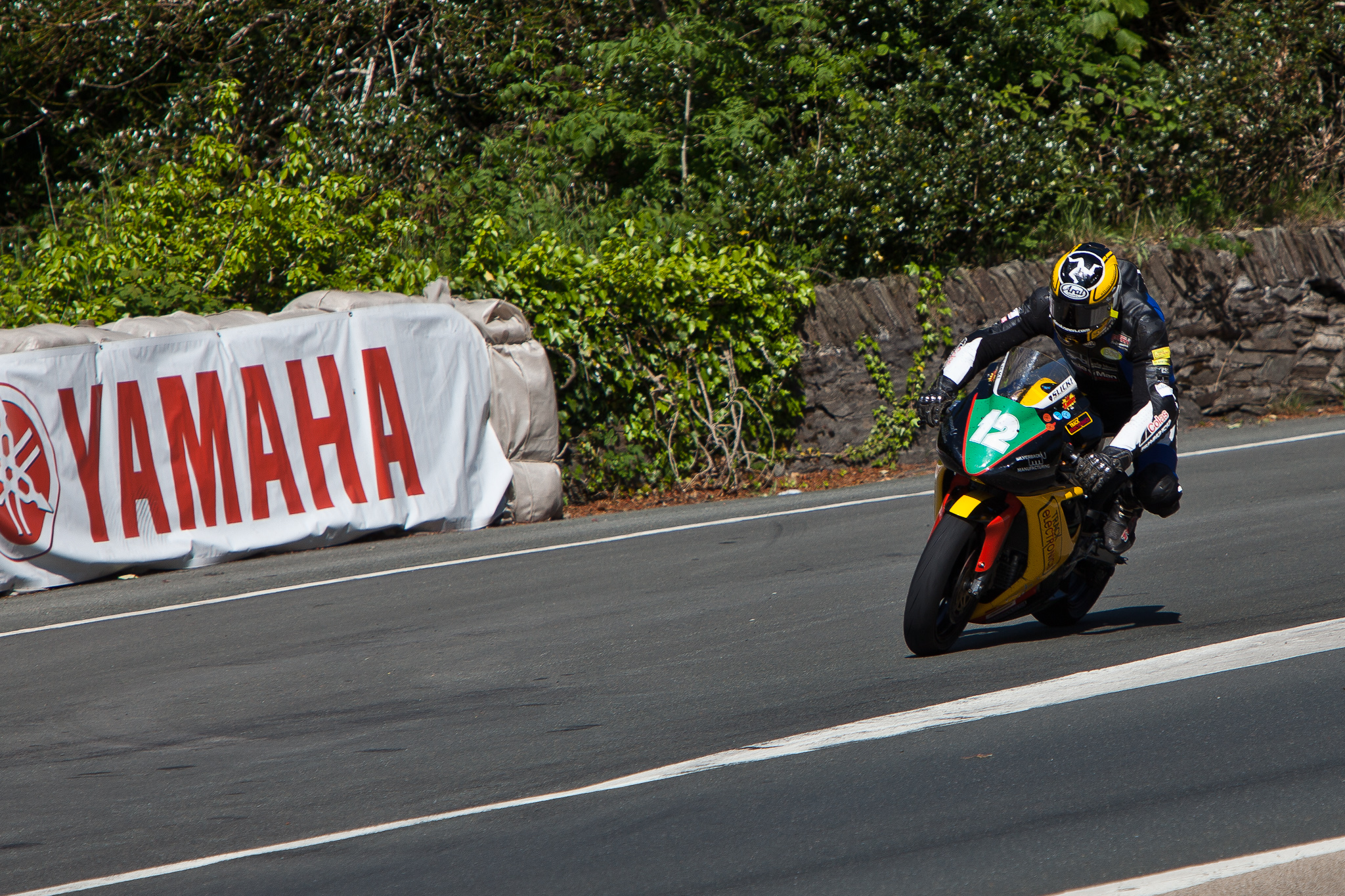
Kneen during the Lightweight TT race at the 2013 Isle of Man TT. He finished 13th in the race, his only finish in four Lightweight TT starts.

For the 2012 season, Kneen committed to a fourth campaign for Marks Bloom Racing – with the team now using Suzuki machinery with technical assistance from the main Suzuki road racing team, TAS Racing. Kneen endured a tough season on the short circuits in the Superstock 1000 class, recording a single points-scoring finish of 12th place at Oulton Park in May. On the roads in Northern Ireland, Kneen achieved a pair of eighth-place finishes in the Supersport races at May's North West 200, and four top-ten finishes at the Ulster Grand Prix in August. For the first time since he started competing at the Isle of Man TT, Kneen was unable to record a top-ten finish, with a best result of eleventh in the Superbike TT. He crashed out of the first Supersport race, after he was highsided off the bike on the exit from Governor's Dip onto the Glencrutchery Road; he suffered a back injury in the crash, which ruled him out of racing until the Ulster Grand Prix. At the end of the season, Kneen returned to the Macau Grand Prix, recording a ninth-place finish.

Kneen remained with Marks Bloom Racing into 2013, with the team continuing to use Suzukis for the road racing campaign. Just like in 2011, Kneen missed the early portion of his British championship campaign – remaining in Superstock 1000 – and the North West 200, due to injuries sustained from an accident at RAF Jurby. He returned to competition at the Isle of Man TT, finishing five out of the six races he started, with a best result of eleventh place in the first Supersport race. While competing at July's Southern 100, Kneen crashed out on the final corner of the Supersport race, suffering a broken elbow. Following recovery, Kneen returned to the roads at November's Macau Grand Prix; he qualified in tenth position but failed to start the race, after a mechanical issue on the formation lap.

=== Burrows Engineering Racing ===
After five years with Marks Bloom Racing, Kneen moved to the Northern Irish Burrows Engineering Racing team, run by former TT competitor John Burrows, for the 2014 season. He made his début for the team at the Cookstown 100 races in April, where he won the race on corrected times from the second wave of starting riders, having qualified in eleventh position. He followed this up the following weekend, at the Tandragee 100, with victories in the Open and main Superbike races, leading into the North West 200 international meeting. At the event, Kneen had one top-ten finish, coming in the Saturday Superstock race. Moving on to the Isle of Man TT in June, Kneen had three top-ten finishes, with a best of seventh place in the Superstock race. Following the TT, Kneen took a pair of victories at the Kells Road Races in County Meath, four podiums at the Dungannon and District Motorcycle Club's Bush Road Races, and a victory in the main Superbike race at the Skerries 100. Later in July, Kneen again recorded four podium finishes at a race meeting, at the Southern 100; in the process of doing so, Kneen recorded the fastest lap of the Billown Circuit by a Manx rider, lapping at 113.044 mph (181.927 km/h) during the Senior race – surpassing Conor Cummins' previous best speed.

Kneen added a victory at the Walderstown Race of the South meeting, and a third-place finish at the Armoy Road Races, to seal the Ulster Superbike Championship. In preparation for August's Ulster Grand Prix, Kneen finalised the Irish Superbike Championship with a victory in the Faugheen 50, where he also won the Supersport race. At the Ulster Grand Prix, Kneen took his first international road race victory, winning the opening race of the day, the Superstock event. In the race, Kneen battled Dean Harrison and Bruce Anstey for the lead, with the trio trading the race lead throughout; on the final lap, Kneen went round the outside of Harrison on the penultimate corner, and was able to fend him off to the timing line. Kneen's winning margin of 0.001 seconds over Harrison was the closest in Ulster Grand Prix history. Kneen and Harrison were later involved in a race-stopping crash in the following Supersport race; Harrison crashed on slick roads, with Kneen and Keith Amor crashing out in avoidance. All three riders suffered broken bones in the accident, with Kneen fracturing his foot. The crash ruled Kneen out for the remainder of 2014, missing the Classic TT – where he had previously been announced as a replacement for the injured Cameron Donald – and the Macau Grand Prix, having previously been announced on the race's entry list.

=== Valvoline Racing by Padgett's ===
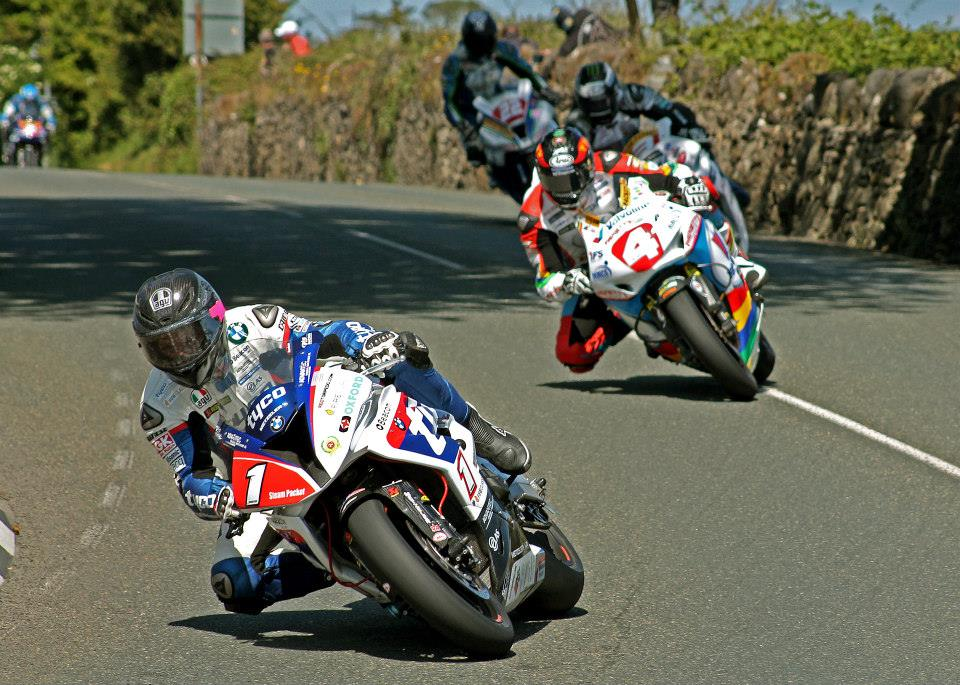
Kneen (4) following Guy Martin (1) during the 2015 Southern 100 races. Kneen took three podium finishes at the meeting, with a best finish of second, to Martin, in the solo championship race.

Kneen left Burrows Engineering Racing to join the Millsport Racing team on a one-year contract, in November 2014. However, in February 2015, Kneen was looking for a new deal as Millsport Racing did not have enough funding to run their original schedule. A month later, Kneen signed a deal with the Valvoline Racing by Padgett's team, joining Bruce Anstey and Cameron Donald in the team. His first race with the team came at Donington Park in the British National Superstock 1000 cc Championship, where he took an eighth-place finish. At the North West 200, Kneen finished only one of the four races he entered, finishing eleventh in the Saturday Superstock race. As he did in 2014, Kneen had three top-ten finishes at the Isle of Man TT, finishing seventh in the Superbike TT, and ninth in both Supersport TT races. In the Senior TT, Kneen recorded his fastest lap speed of the Mountain Course to that point, lapping at 130 mph (209 km/h) exactly.

The following month at the Southern 100, Kneen recorded three podium finishes, with a best finish of second to Guy Martin, in the solo championship race. As a precursor to August's Ulster Grand Prix, Kneen contested the Superbike race in the Dundrod 150 two days prior, qualifying in eighth position and finishing the race in fourth. In the race, he also recorded his best lap speed at the Dundrod Circuit, lapping at 130.937 mph (210.723 km/h) on the final lap. Kneen was unable to defend his Superstock race win from the 2014 Ulster Grand Prix, finishing seventh, in the 2015 edition; his best result at the meeting was a sixth-place finish in the second Superbike race. After missing out on the Classic TT in 2014 due to his Ulster Grand Prix injury, Kneen made his Classic TT début in 2015. At the event, he rode a 1989 Superbike World Championship-specification Yamaha OW01, based upon the Yamaha FZ750, in the Formula 1 Classic TT, where he finished in ninth position. He completed the season with a pair of fourth places in the Darley Moor Motor Cycle Road Race Club's Stars at Darley meeting in October.

=== Mar-Train Racing ===
In November 2015, it was announced that Kneen was to replace Dean Harrison at Mar-Train Racing, the official Yamaha UK road racing team, for the 2016 season, where he would compete in the Irish road races alongside the international meetings. He made his bow with the team at an Irish short circuit meeting held at the Kirkistown Circuit, finishing second in both Superbike races. He then competed at the Tandragee 100, winning the feature race of the meeting, just as he did in 2014, and also finished second in the Supersport race. He also won the Open race on-the-road, but was penalised 60 seconds for a jump start, dropping him to tenth. The following weekend, Kneen took three podium finishes at the Cookstown 100, in preparation for the North West 200 in mid-May. However, Kneen missed both that event and the Isle of Man TT, after breaking his arm in a mountain biking accident.

He made his return to racing at the Southern 100 in July, with a best result of second place to Michael Dunlop in the Senior race. On three occasions at the Ulster Grand Prix, Kneen improved on his fastest lap speed personal best at the Dundrod Circuit – by the end of the meeting, he had recorded a lap speed of 133.373 mph (214.643 km/h), in the second Superbike race; his best race performance came during the Superstock race, where he recorded Mar-Train Racing's first Ulster Grand Prix podium with a third-place finish. He contested the Lightweight and Superbike Classic TT races at the end of August, but failed to finish either race. Kneen finished his season with two podiums at the Gold Cup meeting at Oliver's Mount in Scarborough, North Yorkshire, and an eleventh-place finish in the Macau Grand Prix, having hoped for a podium placing at the event.

=== DTR and Penz13.com BMW Motorrad Racing ===
For the second time in less than two years, Kneen found himself out of a ride due to the team not being able to be compete going forward – Mar-Train Racing withdrew from competition in December 2016 after a decade in the sport. It was not until January 2017 that Kneen was able to find a new ride, signing for the Penz13.com BMW Motorrad Racing Team, run by another former TT competitor, Rico Penzkofer. In addition to this deal to ride Superbikes, Kneen signed a deal to ride BMW Superstock and Kawasaki Supertwin machinery for Danny Tomlinson Racing, in March 2017. Kneen made his début with the team at Donington Park in the British National Superstock 1000 cc Championship, scoring a championship point in the weekend's final race. Kneen continued his preparation for the international meetings, by contesting the Enkalon Trophy on Easter Saturday, an Irish short-circuit event at Bishopscourt, outside of Downpatrick. Kneen won the event overall, with a victory and a second-place finish over the two Superbike races. He added two further victories on Easter Monday at the Kirkistown Circuit, in another Irish short-circuit championship meeting.

After a best result of eighth place in the Superstock race, at the North West 200, Kneen contested the 300 Curves of Gustav Havel event for the first time, at Hořice in the Czech Republic. He finished eighth once again, this time in the Superbike race. Ahead of the Isle of Man TT, Kneen picked up an additional ride, signing for Jackson Racing to compete in the Supersport TT races, replacing Lee Johnston. In the opening Superbike TT race, Kneen finished fifth despite a time penalty for exceeding the maximum speed limit in pit lane during one of his pit-stops. Following an eighth place in the only Supersport race to be held – the second race was cancelled due to the weather – Kneen recorded a TT-best finish during the Superstock TT. Having started at number 14 on the running order, Kneen started well and moved up to fourth position on the first lap of the race, before reaching the podium positions by the end of the second lap. He held on for the remainder of the race, and as a result, sealed his first rostrum finish at the Isle of Man TT, stating that the podium was "a feeling I can't describe at the moment". Kneen completed the race meeting with twelfth in the Senior TT.

Kneen's next race meeting was on foreign soil, competing in the Imatranajo road races at the Imatra Circuit in Finland. Kneen took a victory and a second place in the two Superbike races, with each race finishing in a 1–2–3 for the team. The following week, Kneen competed at the Southern 100, where he recorded his best series of results at the event. In the opening race of the week, Kneen led for most of the race but was passed by Michael Dunlop before the end, as he took a second-place finish along with a lap record for the 600 cc–1000 cc combination race at 114.185 mph (183.763 km/h). On the following two days, Dunlop and Kneen battled over victory once again in the Senior races, with Dunlop prevailing on both occasions by 0.184 seconds, and 0.901 seconds respectively. In the final race of the week, Kneen contested for the win in the Solo Championship race along with Dean Harrison and Dunlop, with Harrison ultimately claiming the honours by 0.131 seconds over Kneen and 0.515 seconds over Dunlop. All three riders set an outright lap record as they crossed the timing line on the final lap, in excess of 115.5 mph (185.9 km/h). Kneen returned to the team after his Tyco BMW replacement rides in November for the Macau Grand Prix, run in conjunction with Paul Bird Motorsport and Paul Poon's Tak Chun Racing. Kneen finished eleventh in the race, which was called after five laps following an accident that resulted in the death of Daniel Hegarty.

=== Tyco BMW ===
In August 2017, it was announced that Kneen would compete at the Ulster Grand Prix for the Tyco BMW team. Kneen was signed to replace the injured Ian Hutchinson, following his crash during the Senior TT at the Isle of Man TT. In his first start with the team – in the Dundrod 150 Superbike race – Kneen finished fourth, missing out on a podium by 0.05 seconds behind Bruce Anstey, having run as high as second on the final lap. He qualified on the front row for the 1000 cc races, qualifying second in Superbike and third in Superstock. In the races, Kneen took a third-place finish in Superstock and finishes of fourth and second in the two Superbike races, missing out on victory by just over a tenth of a second in the latter Superbike race, after leading on the final lap. Kneen also took a fifth-place finish in the Classic TT Superbike race at the end of the month, riding a Kawasaki Ninja ZX-7R for Mistral Racing.

In November 2017, Kneen was confirmed for a full road season campaign with Tyco BMW in 2018, and in February 2018, it was announced that Kneen would return with Jackson Racing to contest the Supersport races at the international road racing meetings. As he did in 2017, he contested the opening Donington Park meeting of the British National Superstock 1000 cc Championship; in the races, Kneen took finishes of seventh, fourth and tenth. He also contested the second round at Brands Hatch two weeks later, but failed to add any championship points to his tally. From there, Kneen shifted his focus to the roads, with his first meeting of the season being the Tandragee 100. Kneen qualified on the front row for the Superbike races, and finished second to Derek Sheils in the Open race, setting a lap record of 109.609 mph (176.399 km/h) for the Orritor Circuit. In the feature race, Kneen was part of a lead quartet that battled it out for race honours, along with Sheils, Derek McGee and Michael Sweeney. Kneen ran at the back of the group for a time, before making his way to the front, taking the lead on the final lap and won a closely fought race with half a second covering the podium positions. At the North West 200, Kneen finished three out of the six races, with a best of sixth place in the Superstock race, his best North West 200 result.

== Death ==
On 30 May 2018, during qualifying practice for the 2018 Isle of Man TT, Kneen died after an accident at the Churchtown section of the circuit, 22 miles (35.2 km) into the lap. As a result, Kneen became the 147th competitor to be killed at the Mountain Course during an Isle of Man TT meeting, and the 256th competitor when counting other meetings such as the Manx Grand Prix and the Classic TT. The previous evening, Kneen had unofficially recorded his fastest ever lap of the Mountain Course, lapping at 132.258 mph (212.849 km/h) during Superbike qualifying.

In the immediate aftermath of Kneen's crash, competitor Steve Mercer was seriously injured after colliding with a course-car conveying police officers to officiate at the scene of the fatality. Mercer was one of a number of riders who were proceeding back to the paddock in the reverse-direction after the red flag stoppage, causing organisers to change their protocols, requiring that returning riders must be controlled by travelling marshals to the front and rear. An independent inquiry into the circumstances has been arranged by ACU Events, the event organisers.

On the day following the crashes, Kneen's father Richard gave his backing to the Tyco BMW team for them to continue in the meeting, while his brother and fellow TT competitor Ryan Kneen completed a lap of honour of the Mountain Course, as a tribute. Tyco BMW elected to continue at the 2018 Isle of Man TT, with the team winning the opening race of the meeting, as Michael Dunlop won the Superbike TT. Dunlop and runner-up Conor Cummins dedicated their race performances to Kneen. Ryan Kneen later received the PokerStars Spirit of the TT Award from the event organisers ahead of the Senior TT.

At a preliminary inquest at the Isle of Man Courts of Justice, coroner and High Bailiff John Needham certified that Kneen had died of "multiple injuries" in the crash which had been estimated to have occurred at 140 mph (225 km/h). A full inquest, initially notified to be heard at a later date, commenced on 28 September 2018, but was further delayed due to a lack of information from the telemetry of Kneen's motorcycle.

A verdict of death by misadventure was returned at the conclusion of the inquest in February 2019. Competitor Dean Harrison, who was travelling behind Kneen, estimated his speed at the time of the crash to be between 180 mph (290 km/h) and 190 mph (306 km/h).

Kneen's funeral was held on 15 June at Douglas Crematorium, with mourners requested to wear motorcycle gear or casual clothing.

A commemorative bench to Kneen was sited in May 2019, close to the Media Centre in the TT Grandstand area.

== Career statistics ==
=== Isle of Man TT results ===
Over his Isle of Man TT career, Kneen started 39 races, finishing 31 of these.

Race	2009	2010	2011	2012	2013	2014	2015	2016	2017
Superbike TT	13	12	DNF	11	14	11	7	—	5
Supersport TT	11	5	6	DNF	11	14	9	—	8
Supersport TT	DNF	10	DNF	—	DNF	8	9	—	—
Superstock TT	10	15	7	—	20	7	12	—	**3**
Lightweight TT	—	—	—	DNF	13	DNF	DNF	—	—
Senior TT	—	8	12	—	12	8	13	—	12

=== British Supersport Championship ===
(key) (Races in bold indicate pole position, races in italics indicate fastest lap)

Year	Bike	1	2	3	4	5	6	7	8	9	10	11	12	Pos	Pts
2010	Yamaha	BHI; 17	THR; 11	OUL; Ret	CAD; 18	MAL; 19	KNO; Ret	SNE	BHGP; 14	CAD; 14	CRO; 14	SIL; 22	OUL; 27	29th	6

=== British Superbike Championship ===
Year	Class	Make	1		2		3		4		5		6		7		8			9			10		11		12			Pos	Pts	Ref
Year	Class	Make	R1	R2	R1	R2	R1	R2	R1	R2	R1	R2	R1	R2	R1	R2	R1	R2	R3	R1	R2	R3	R1	R2	R1	R2	R1	R2	R3	Pos	Pts	Ref
2011	BSB	Kawasaki	BHI; WD	BHI; WD	OUL; WD	OUL; WD	CRO	CRO	THR; 22	THR; DNS	KNO; DNS	KNO; DNS	SNE; Ret	SNE; 21	OUL; 20	OUL; C	BHGP; 13	BHGP; 23	BHGP; Ret	CAD	CAD	CAD	DON; Ret	DON; Ret	SIL; 23	SIL; 21	BHGP; Ret	BHGP; 17	BHGP; Ret	34th	3	
2011	E (Note: Denotes rider participating in the Evo class within the British Superbike Championship.)	Kawasaki	BHI; WD	BHI; WD	OUL; WD	OUL; WD	CRO	CRO	THR; 22	THR; DNS	KNO; DNS	KNO; DNS	SNE; Ret	SNE; 21	OUL; 20	OUL; C	BHGP; 13	BHGP; 23	BHGP; Ret	CAD	CAD	CAD	DON; Ret	DON; Ret	SIL; 23	SIL; 21	BHGP; Ret	BHGP; 17	BHGP; Ret	12th	73	

== See also ==
- List of Snaefell Mountain Course fatalities
