= 2011 Isle of Man TT =

Annual motorcycle racing event

2011 Isle of Man TT Races
- Isle of Man TT Mountain Course layout

Race details
- Date: 30 May – 10 June 2011
- Location: Douglas, Isle of Man
- Course: Isle of Man TT Mountain Course; 37.733 mi (60.725 km)

Superbike TT
Pole Position	Fastest Lap
Bruce Anstey	Bruce Anstey
131.431 mph	131.379 mph
Podium
1. John McGuinness
2. Cameron Donald	3. Gary Johnson

Sidecar TT Race 1
Pole Position	Fastest Lap
Klaus Klaffenböck / Dan Sayle	John Holden/ Andrew Winkle
113.754 mph	114.861 mph
Podium
1. Klaus Klaffenböck / Dan Sayle
2. John Holden/ Andrew Winkle	3. Conrad Harrison/ Mike Aylott

Supersport TT Race 1
Pole Position	Fastest Lap
Michael Dunlop	Bruce Anstey
125.464 mph	126.595 mph
Podium
1. Bruce Anstey
2. Keith Amor	3. Guy Martin

Superstock TT Race
Pole Position	Fastest Lap
Michael Dunlop	Michael Dunlop
130.024 mph	129.709 mph
Podium
1. Michael Dunlop
2. John McGuinness	3. Guy Martin

Supersport TT Race 2
Pole Position	Fastest Lap
Michael Dunlop	Gary Johnson
125.464 mph	125.892 mph
Podium
1. Gary Johnson
2. John McGuinness	3. Guy Martin

Sidecar TT Race 2
Pole Position	Fastest Lap
Klaus Klaffenböck / Dan Sayle	John Holden/ Andrew Winkle
113.754 mph	114.672 mph
Podium
1. John Holden/ Andrew Winkle
2. Conrad Harrison/ Mike Aylott	3. Tony Elmer/ Darren Marshall

TT Zero
Pole Position	Fastest Lap
Michael Rutter	Michael Rutter
92.779 mph	99.604 mph
Podium
1. Michael Rutter
2. Mark Miller	3. George Spence

Senior TT
Pole Position	Fastest Lap
Bruce Anstey	John McGuinness
131.431 mph	131.248 mph
Podium
1. John McGuinness
2. Guy Martin	3. Bruce Anstey

The 2011 Isle of Man TT Festival was scheduled to be held between Monday 30 May and Friday 10 June 2011 on the 37.73-mile Snaefell Mountain Course in the Isle of Man. The main celebration for the 2011 Isle of Man TT Races the Milestones of the Mountain Course special parade lap held on 10 June 2011 to commemorate the centenary of the Isle of Man TT Mountain Course included the former FIM World Champions Giacomo Agostini and Phil Read. The 2011 Isle of Man TT Festival also included the Pre-TT Classic Races on 27, 28 and 30 May 2011 and the Post-TT Races on 11 June 2011 and both events held on the Billown Circuit.

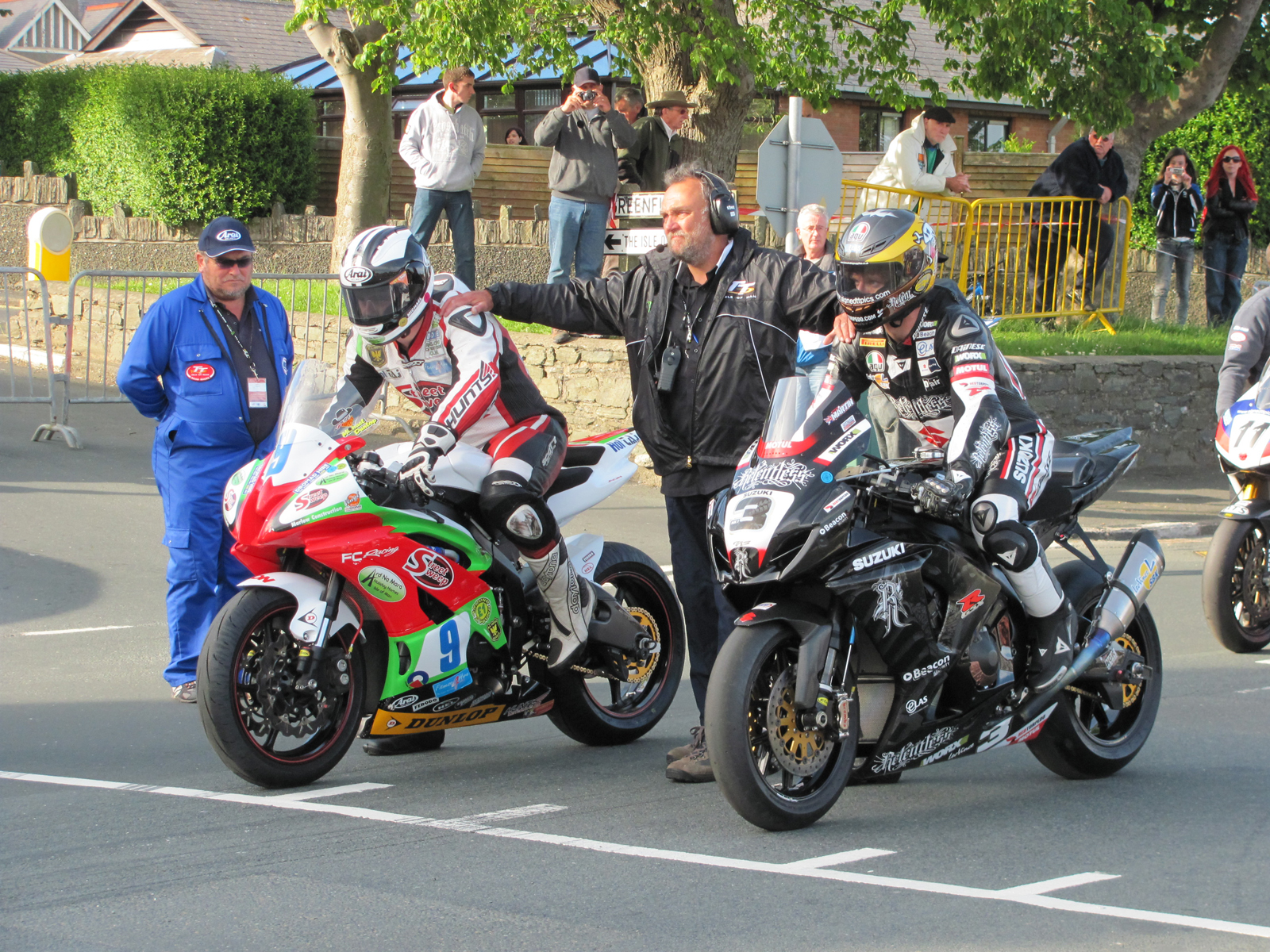
Two riders at the start of Tuesday evening practice

The Blue Riband event of the 2011 TT Race week the Senior TT was delayed several hours after a heavy rain shower in the Ramsey area of the Mountain Course. The Senior TT was won by John McGuinness and after also winning the Superbike TT Race raised to 17 wins his tally of Isle of Man TT victories. The Supersport TT Race 1 was reduced to 3 laps (113.00 miles) and after a tactical battle was won by the New Zealand competitor Bruce Anstey. The Supersport TT Race 2 produced a first win for Gary Johnson and the sidecar crew John Holden/Andrew Winkle also scored a popular maiden win in the second Sidecar TT Race. After dominating Sidecar TT practice the former Austrian World Sidecar Champion Klaus Klaffenböck scored his third Isle of Man TT win in the Sidecar TT Race 1. The Superstock TT Race for production motorcycles was won by Michael Dunlop. In the TT Zero race for battery powered electric motor driven motorcycles the American MotoCzysz team won for the second year and the race time for Michael Rutter falling slightly short of the coveted 100 mph average lap speed.

During the second practice session the sidecar crew of Bill Currie/Kevin Morgan crashed fatally at Ballacrye Corner. The former 2007 Junior Manx Grand Prix winner Derek Brien died in an accident at Gorse Lea during lap 1 of the Supersport TT Race 1, and the race was red-flagged after the incident and re-run later in the day.

== Results ==
=== Practice times ===
==== Practice times and leaderboard superbike/Senior TT ====
Plates; Black on White/Black on Yellow.

Rank	Rider	Mon 30 May	Tues 31 May	Wed 1 June	Thurs 2 June	Fri 3 June
1	(New Zealand) Bruce Anstey; 999 cc Honda	—— No Time	17' 55.91; 126.245 mph	17' 27.29; 129.695 mph	Cancelled; No Time	17' 13.46; 131.431 mph
2	(England) John McGuinness; 999 cc Honda	18' 25.75; 122.838 mph	17' 32.59; 129.041 mph	17' 57.76; 126.029 mph	Cancelled; No Time	17' 19.91; 130.615 mph
3	(England) Guy Martin; 1000 cc Suzuki	18' 39.03; 121.380 mph	17' 39.00; 128.261 mph	17' 30.22; 129.333 mph	Cancelled; No Time	17' 24.23; 130.075 mph
4	(Northern Ireland) Michael Dunlop; 1000 cc Kawasaki	—— No Time	17' 55.44; 126.300 mph	17' 38.93; 128.269 mph	Cancelled; No Time	17' 24.63; 130.024 mph
5	(England) Gary Johnson; 1000 cc Honda	18' 29.14; 122.463 mph	17' 43.51; 127.717 mph	17' 37.43; 128.452 mph	Cancelled; No Time	17' 36.58; 128.554 mph
6	(England) Michael Rutter; 1200 cc Ducati	—— No Time	18' 14.21; 124.134 mph	17' 51.10; 126.811 mph	Cancelled; No Time	17' 39.00; 128.261 mph
7	(Australia) Cameron Donald; 1000 cc Honda	18' 42.07; 121.051 mph	17' 40.42; 128.089 mph	17' 44.75; 127.568 mph	Cancelled; No Time	18' 01.79; 129.695 mph
8	(England) Daniel Stewart; 1000 cc Honda	19' 09.70; 118.142 mph	17' 59.62; 125.811 mph	17' 48.40; 127.132 mph	Cancelled; No Time	17' 43.80; 127.682 mph
9	(Scotland) Keith Amor; 999 cc Honda	18' 27.26; 122.637 mph	17' 58.72; 125.916 mph	17' 45.06; 127.531 mph	Cancelled; No Time	17' 48.62; 127.106 mph
10	(Northern Ireland) William Dunlop; 1000 cc Honda	—— No Time	18' 10.12; 124.599 mph	17' 59.10; 125.872 mph	Cancelled; No Time	18' 37.81; 121.513 mph
11	(England) James Hillier; 1000 cc Kawasaki	—— No Time	—— No Time	—— No Time	Cancelled; No Time	18' 09.44; 124.677 mph
12	(Portugal) Luís Carreira; 1000 cc Kawasaki	—— No Time	—— No Time	—— No Time	Cancelled; No Time	18' 13.41; 124.224 mph
13	(Northern Ireland) John Burrows; 1000 cc Suzuki	19' 27.14; 116.377 mph	18' 43.34; 120.915 mph	18' 21.39; 123.324 mph	Cancelled; No Time	18' 13.61; 124.202 mph
14	(Northern Ireland) Ryan Farquhar; 1000 cc	18' 56.61; 119.502 mph	18' 14.94; 124.051 mph	—— No Time	Cancelled; No Time	18' 17.45; 123.767 mph
15	(England) Ian Mackman; 1000 cc Suzuki	19' 13.19; 117.785 mph	18' 30.89; 122.270 mph	18' 17.93; 123.713 mph	Cancelled; No Time	18' 31.07; 122.250 mph
16	(Isle of Man) Dan Kneen; 1000 cc Kawasaki	—— No Time	18' 31.23; 122.232 mph	—— No Time	Cancelled; No Time	18' 17.96; 123.710 mph
17	(Isle of Man) Conor Cummins; 1000 cc Kawasaki	19' 40.80; 120.427 mph	18' 49.99; 120.203 mph	19' 12.06; 117.900 mph	Cancelled; No Time	18' 19.22; 115.052 mph
18	(Northern Ireland) Adrian Archibald; 1000 cc Kawasaki	—— No Time	19' 18.80; 117.215 mph	18' 24.01; 123.032 mph	Cancelled; No Time	18' 24.01; 123.032 mph
19	(England) Steve Mercer; 1000 cc Kawasaki	—— No Time	19' 39.68; 115.140 mph	18' 47.07; 120.514 mph	Cancelled; No Time	18' 26.84; 122.717 mph
20	(England) Robert Barber; 1000 cc Honda	—— No Time	18' 47.89; 120.427 mph	18' 31.08; 122.248 mph	Cancelled; No Time	18' 36.20; 121.688 mph

==== Practice times and leaderboard supersport Junior TT ====
Rank	Rider	Mon 30 May	Tues 31 May	Wed 1 June	Thurs 2 June	Fri 3 June
1	(Northern Ireland) Michael Dunlop; 600 cc Yamaha	—— No Time	18' 02.60; 125.462 mph	—— No Time	Cancelled; No Time	18' 04.32; 125.266 mph
2	(Australia) Cameron Donald; 600 cc Honda	—— No Time	17' 40.42; 128.089 mph	18' 05.67; 125.110 mph	Cancelled; No Time	—— No Time
3	(New Zealand) Bruce Anstey; 599 cc Honda	—— No Time	18' 55.91; 124.236 mph	18' 43.04; 120.947 mph	Cancelled; No Time	—— No Time
4	(Northern Ireland) William Dunlop; 600 cc Honda	—— No Time	—— No Time	18' 15.75; 123.959 mph	Cancelled; No Time	—— No Time
5	(England) John McGuinness; 599 cc Honda	—— No Time	18' 54.35; 119.741 mph	18' 47.02; 120.519 mph	Cancelled; No Time	18' 19.68; 123.516 mph
6	(England) Guy Martin; 600 cc Suzuki	—— No Time	—— No Time	18' 22.66; 123.182 mph	Cancelled; No Time	—— No Time
7	(England) Gary Johnson; 600 cc Honda	—— No Time	—— No Time	—— No Time	Cancelled; No Time	18' 23.51; 123.087 mph
8	(Scotland) Keith Amor; 600 cc Honda	—— No Time	—— No Time	—— No Time	Cancelled; No Time	18' 27.35; 122.660 mph
9	(Isle of Man) Dan Kneen; 600 cc Yamaha	—— No Time	19' 02.34; 118.903 mph	18' 41.42; 121.121 mph	Cancelled; No Time	—— No Time
10	(England) Ben Wylie; 600 cc Yamaha	20' 50.80; 108.593 mph	19' 07.43; 118.376 mph	18' 46.44; 120.582 mph	Cancelled; No Time	18' 41.60; 121.103 mph

==== Practice times and leaderboard 600 cc Sidecar TT ====
Rank	Rider	Mon 30 May	Tues 31 May	Wed 1 June	Thurs 2 June	Fri 3 June
1	(Austria) Klaus Klaffenböck / (Isle of Man) Dan Sayle; LCR Honda 600 cc	20' 24.66; 110.911 mph	Cancelled; No Time	19' 54.05; 113.754 mph	19' 55.96; 113.572 mph	21' 02.39; 107.596 mph
2	(England) Tim Reeves / (France) Gregory Cluze; Honda 600 cc	21' 26.55; 105.576 mph	Cancelled; No Time	20' 19.52; 111.379 mph	21' 11.16; 106.854 mph	19' 58.61; 113.321 mph
3	(England) John Holden / (England) Andrew Winkle; LCR Suzuki 599 cc	21' 14.55; 106.569 mph	Cancelled; No Time	20' 22.95; 111.066 mph	20' 06.05; 112.623 mph	20' 05.14; 112.707 mph
4	(England) Tony Elmer / (England) Darren Marshall; Ireson Yamaha 600 cc	21' 09.70; 106.977 mph	Cancelled; No Time	—— No Time	20' 32.22; 110.230 mph	20' 19.38; 111.391 mph
5	(England) Conrad Harrison / (England) Mike Aylott; Shelbourne Honda 600 cc	21' 39.85; 104.495 mph	Cancelled; No Time	20' 41.82; 109.379 mph	20' 28.70; 110.546 mph	20' 26.93; 1110.705 mph
6	(England) Gary Bryan / (England) Jamie Winn; Baker Honda 600 cc	21' 51.42; 103.574 mph	Cancelled; No Time	21' 10.04; 106.948 mph	20' 36.28; 109.869 mph	20' 48.75; 108.771 mph
7	(England) Ben Birchall / (England) Tom Birchall; LCR Honda 600 cc	23' 17.62; 97.185 mph	Cancelled; No Time	21' 13.44; 106.662 mph	20' 50.45; 108.623 mph	—— No Time
8	(England) Roy Hanks / (England) Dave Wells; Molyneux 599 cc	—— No Time	Cancelled; No Time	21' 33.76; 104.987 mph	21' 05.87; 107.300 mph	—— No Time
9	(England) Gregory Lambert / (Republic of Ireland) Aaron Galligan; Honda 600 cc	27' 39.03; 81.872 mph	Cancelled; No Time	36' 35.25; 61.874 mph	Cancelled; No Time	21' 08.91; 107.043 mph
10	(England) Simon Neary / (Isle of Man) Jason Crowe; Honda 600 cc	21' 09.76; 106.971 mph	Cancelled; No Time	—— No Time	—— No Time	—— No Time

=== Race results ===
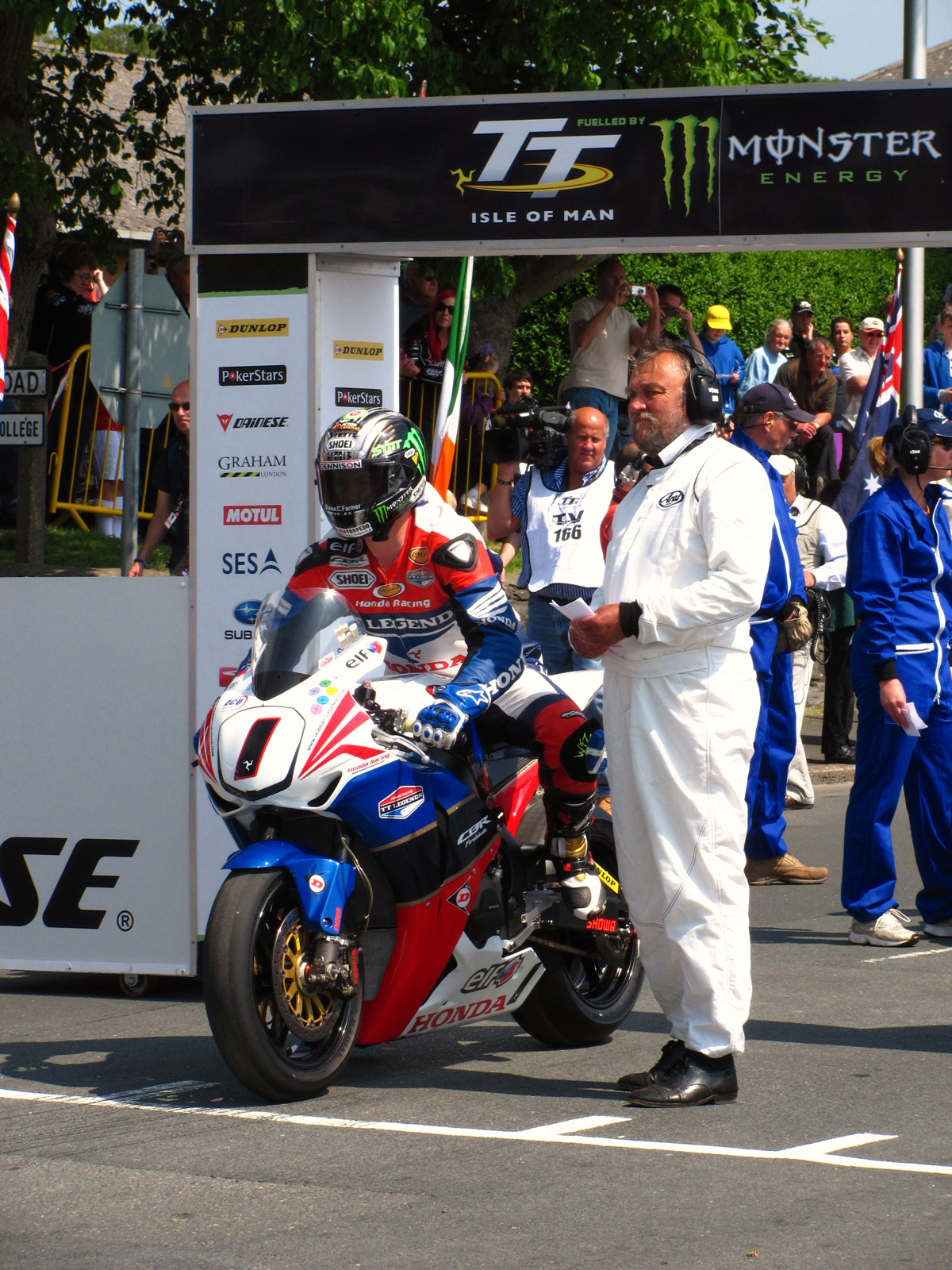
Superbike TT winner John McGuinness at the start of the race

==== 2011 Superbike TT final standings. ====
4 June 2011 6 Laps (236.38 Miles) Mountain Course.

Rank	Rider	Team	Speed	Time
1	(England) John McGuinness	Honda 999 cc	127.870 mph	1:46.13.40
2	(Australia) Cameron Donald	Honda 1000 cc	126.739 mph	1:47.10.30
3	(England) Gary Johnson	Honda 1000 cc	126.549 mph	1:47.19.97
4	(Scotland) Keith Amor	Honda 1000 cc	125.701 mph	1:48.03.36
5	(Northern Ireland) Michael Dunlop	Kawasaki 1000 cc	124.584 mph	1:49.01.53
6	(England) Daniel Stewart	Honda 1000 cc	124.546 mph	1:49.03.50
7	(Northern Ireland) William Dunlop	Honda 1000 cc	124.511 mph	1:49.05.34
8	(England) James Hillier	Kawasaki 1000 cc	123.274 mph	1:50.11.01
9	(Northern Ireland) Adrian Archibald	BMW 1000 cc	122.981 mph	1:50.26.81
10	(England) Ian Mackman	Suzuki 1000 cc	121.486 mph	1:51.48.31

Fastest Lap: Bruce Anstey – 131.379 mph (17' 13.88) on lap 1.

==== 2011 Sidecar TT Race 1 TT final standings ====
4 June 2011 3 Laps (113.00 Miles) Mountain Course.

Rank	Rider	Team	Speed	Time
1	(Austria) Klaus Klaffenböck / (Isle of Man) Dan Sayle	LCR Honda 600 cc	114.262 mph	59’ 26.21
2	(England) John Holden / (England) Andrew Winkle	LCR Suzuki 599 cc	113.890 mph	59’ 37.87
3	(England) Conrad Harrison / (England) Mike Aylott	Shelbourne Honda 600 cc	112.273 mph	1:00.29.41
4	(England) Tim Reeves / (France) Gregory Cluze	Honda 600 cc	111.893 mph	1:00.41.74
5	(England) Tony Elmer / (England) Darren Marshall	Ireson Yamaha 600 cc	111.490 mph	1:00.54.91
6	(England) Gary Bryan / (England) Jamie Winn	Baker Honda 600 cc	110.701 mph	1:01.20.93
7	(England) Ben Birchall / (England) Tom Birchall	LCR Honda 600 cc	109.463 mph	1:02.02.56
8	(England) Douglas Wright / (England) Martin Hull	Baker Honda 600 cc	109.327 mph	1:02.07.19
9	(England) Gregory Lambert / (Republic of Ireland) Aaron Galligan	Honda 600 cc	108.920 mph	1:02.21.13
10	(England) Carl Fenwick / (England) Mark Sayers	Shelbourne Honda 600 cc	107.200 mph	1:03.21.17

Fastest Lap: John Holden/Andrew Winkle – 114.861 mph (19' 42.55) on lap 3.

==== 2011 Supersport Junior TT Race 1 ====
6 June 2011 3 Laps (113.00 Miles) Mountain Course. Reduced Race Distance

Rank	Rider	Team	Speed	Time
1	(New Zealand) Bruce Anstey	Honda 599 cc	124.232 mph	54' 40.01
2	(Scotland) Keith Amor	Honda 600 cc	123.916 mph	54' 48.40
3	(England) Guy Martin	Suzuki 599 cc	123.628 mph	54' 56.06
4	(England) Gary Johnson	Honda 600 cc	123.584 mph	54' 57.24
5	(England) John McGuinness	Honda 599 cc	123.538 mph	54' 58.45
6	(Isle of Man) Dan Kneen	Yamaha 600 cc	122.902 mph	55' 15.52
7	(Wales) Ian Lougher	Kawasaki 600 cc	120.888 mph	56' 10.74
8	(England) Ben Wylie	Yamaha 600 cc	119.136 mph	57' 00.33
9	(England) Ian Mackman	Triumph 675 cc	118.590 mph	57' 16.07
10	(England) Daniel Stewart	Honda 600 cc	118.277 mph	57' 25.17

Fastest Lap: Bruce Anstey – 126.595 mph (17' 52.94) on lap 3.

==== 2011 Superstock TT final standings. ====
6 June 2011 4 Laps (150.73 Miles) Mountain Course.

Rank	Rider	Team	Speed	Time
1	(Northern Ireland) Michael Dunlop	Kawasaki 1000 cc	127.129 mph	1:11.13.69
2	(England) John McGuinness	Honda 999 cc	126.578 mph	1:11.32.32
3	(England) Guy Martin	Suzuki 999 cc	126.452 mph	1:11.36.59
4	(Scotland) Keith Amor	Honda 1000 cc	126.211 mph	1:11.44.79
5	(Northern Ireland) William Dunlop	Honda 1000 cc	125.300 mph	1:12.16.10
6	(Australia) Cameron Donald	Honda 1000 cc	125.286 mph	1:12.16.58
7	(Isle of Man) Dan Kneen	Kawasaki 1000 cc	124.977 mph	1:12.27.28
8	(England) Michael Rutter	Ducati 1200 cc	123.916 mph	1:13.04.52
9	(Northern Ireland) Adrian Archibald	BMW 1000 cc	123.677 mph	1:13.13.00
10	(England) James Hillier	Kawasaki 1000 cc	123.185 mph	1:13.30.54

Fastest Lap: Michael Dunlop – 129.709 mph (17' 27.17) on lap 4.

==== 2011 Supersport Junior TT Race 2 Mountain Course. ====
9 June 2011 4 Laps (150.73 Miles) Mountain Course.

Rank	Rider	Team	Speed	Time
1	(England) Gary Johnson	Honda 600 cc	123.819 mph	1:13.07.95
2	(England) John McGuinness	Honda 599 cc	123.582 mph	1:13.16.35
3	(England) Guy Martin	Suzuki 599 cc	123.220 mph	1:13.29.28
4	(Scotland) Keith Amor	Honda 600 cc	122.986 mph	1:13.37.67
5	(New Zealand) Bruce Anstey	Honda 599 cc	122.814 mph	1:13.43.85
6	(Isle of Man) Conor Cummins	Kawasaki 600 cc	120.077 mph	1:15.24.68
7	(England) Ben Wylie	Yamaha 600 cc	119.850 mph	1:15.33.25
8	(England) Roy Richardson	Yamaha 600 cc	119.251 mph	1:15.56.04
9	(England) James Hillier	Kawasaki 599 cc	119.067 mph	1:16.03.09
10	(Scotland) Mark Buckley	Kawasaki 600 cc	118.422 mph	1:16.27.92

Fastest Lap: Gary Johnson – 125.892 mph (17' 58.92) on lap 2.

==== 2011 Sidecar TT Race 2 TT final standings ====
9 June 2011 3 Laps (113.00 Miles) Mountain Course.

Rank	Rider	Team	Speed	Time
1	(England) John Holden / (England) Andrew Winkle	LCR Suzuki 599 cc	113.469 mph	59’ 51.15
2	(England) Conrad Harrison / (England) Mike Aylott	Shelbourne Honda 600 cc	112.062 mph	1:00.36.23
3	(England) Tony Elmer / (England) Darren Marshall	Ireson Yamaha 600 cc	111.212 mph	1:01.04.02
4	(England) Tim Reeves / (France) Gregory Cluze	Honda 600 cc	111.188 mph	1:01.04.83
5	(England) Ben Birchall / (England) Tom Birchall	LCR Honda 600 cc	110.971 mph	1:01.11.98
6	(Austria) Klaus Klaffenböck / (Isle of Man) Dan Sayle	LCR Honda 600 cc	110.666 mph	1:01.22.10
7	(England) Gary Bryan / (England) Jamie Winn	Baker Honda 600 cc	109.894 mph	1:01.47.97
8	(England) Douglas Wright / (England) Martin Hull	Baker Honda 600 cc	109.180 mph	1:02.12.21
9	(England) Robert Handcock / (England) Ken Edwards	Honda 600 cc	107.360 mph	1:03.15.50
10	(England) Carl Fenwick / (England) Mark Sayers	Shelbourne Honda 600 cc	106.807 mph	1:03.35.15

Fastest Lap: Klaus Klaffenböck/Dan Sayle – 114.672 mph (19' 44.50) on lap 2.

==== 2011 TT Zero Race ====
9 June 2011 1 Lap (37.73 Miles) Mountain Course.

Rank	Rider	Team	Speed	Time
1	(England) Michael Rutter	MotoCzysz	99.604 mph	22' 43.68
2	(United States) Mark Miller	MotoCzysz	98.288 mph	23' 01.93
3	(Scotland) George Spence	Kingston University	88.435 mph	25' 35.90
4	(Isle of Man) Allan Brew	BMW/MIT	79.163 mph	28' 35.81
5	(Japan) Yoshinari Matsushita	Team Prozza	69.877 mph	32' 23.81

Fastest Lap: Michael Rutter – 99.604 mph (22' 43.68) on lap 1.

==== 2011 Senior TT final standings. ====
10 June 2011 6 Laps (236.38 Miles) Mountain Course.

Rank	Rider	Team	Speed	Time
1	(England) John McGuinness	Honda 999 cc	128.426 mph	1:45.45.80
2	(England) Guy Martin	Suzuki 1000 cc	128.281 mph	1:45.53.00
3	(New Zealand) Bruce Anstey	Honda 1000 cc	128.109 mph	1:46.01.50
4	(Australia) Cameron Donald	Honda 1000 cc	127.061 mph	1:46.54.00
5	(Scotland) Keith Amor	Honda 999 cc	127.040 mph	1:46.55.06
6	(Northern Ireland) Michael Dunlop	Kawasaki 1000 cc	126.404 mph	1:47.27.35
7	(England) Gary Johnson	Honda 1000 cc	125.260 mph	1:48.26.21
8	(Northern Ireland) William Dunlop	Honda 1000 cc	124.438 mph	1:49.09.17
9	(England) James Hillier	Kawasaki 1000 cc	123.922 mph	1:49.36.47
10	(England) Michael Rutter	Ducati 1200 cc	123.632 mph	1:49.51.87

Fastest Lap: John McGuinness – 131.248 mph (17' 14.89) on lap 4.

== Bibliography ==
- "Island Racer 2011: Pure Road Racing Guide". Island Racer. Mortons Media Group. 2011 – via Kelsey Publishing.
