= 2013 Isle of Man TT =

Annual motorcycle racing event

2013 Isle of Man TT Races
- Isle of Man TT Mountain Course layout

Race details
- Date: 25 May – 7 June 2013
- Location: Douglas, Isle of Man
- Course: Isle of Man TT Mountain Course; 37.72 mi (60.70 km)

Sidecar TT Race 1
Pole Position	Fastest Lap
(Isle of Man) Dave Molyneux / (England) Patrick Farrance	(England) Tim Reeves / (Isle of Man) Dan Sayle
114.005 mph	114.608 mph
Podium
1. (England) Tim Reeves / (Isle of Man) Dan Sayle
2. (England) Conrad Harrison / (England) Mike Aylott	3. (Isle of Man) Dave Molyneux / (England) Patrick Farrance

Superbike TT
Pole Position	Fastest Lap
(Northern Ireland) Michael Dunlop	(England) John McGuinness
130.890 mph	131.671 mph
Podium
1. (Northern Ireland) Michael Dunlop
2. (Australia) Cameron Donald	3. (England) John McGuinness

Supersport TT Race 1
Pole Position	Fastest Lap
(Northern Ireland) Michael Dunlop	(Northern Ireland) Michael Dunlop
125.146 mph	127.525 mph
Podium
1. (Northern Ireland) Michael Dunlop
2. (New Zealand) Bruce Anstey	3. (Northern Ireland) William Dunlop

Superstock TT
Pole Position	Fastest Lap
(England) Guy Martin	(Northern Ireland) Michael Dunlop
127.023 mph	131.220 mph
Podium
1. (Northern Ireland) Michael Dunlop
2. (England) Gary Johnson	3. (England) John McGuinness

TT Zero
Pole Position	Fastest Lap
(England) John McGuinness	(England) Michael Rutter
109.038 mph	109.675 mph
Podium
1. (England) Michael Rutter
2. (England) John McGuinness	3. (England) Rob Barber

Supersport TT Race 2
Pole Position	Fastest Lap
(Northern Ireland) Michael Dunlop	(Northern Ireland) Michael Dunlop
125.146 mph	128.667 mph
Podium
1. (Northern Ireland) Michael Dunlop
2. (New Zealand) Bruce Anstey	3. (England) Michael Rutter

Sidecar TT Race 2
Pole Position	Fastest Lap
(Isle of Man) Dave Molyneux / (England) Patrick Farrance	(England) Tim Reeves / (Isle of Man) Dan Sayle
114.005 mph	114.662 mph
Podium
1. (England) Ben Birchall / (England) Tom Birchall
2. (Isle of Man) Dave Molyneux / (England) Patrick Farrance	3. (England) Conrad Harrison / (England) Mike Aylott

Lightweight TT Race
Pole Position	Fastest Lap
(England) James Hillier	(England) James Hillier
115.665 mph	115.554 mph
Podium
1. (England) James Hillier
2. (England) Dean Harrison	3. (Isle of Man) Conor Cummins

The 2013 Isle of Man TT Races were held between the Saturday 25 May and Friday 7 June 2013 on the 37.73-mile Isle of Man TT Mountain Course in the Isle of Man. The event celebrated the 90th anniversary of the first Sidecar TT with a special parade lap for racing sidecar outfits. The 2013 Isle of Man TT Festival also included the Pre-TT Classic Races on 24, 25 & 27 May 2013 and the Post-TT Races on 8 June 2013 and both events held on the Billown Circuit.

The blue ribbon event of race meeting the Senior TT race was won by John McGuinness and raising his tally of victories to 20 Isle of Man TT wins and also breaking the outright course record in the Superbike TT with a lap at an average speed of 131.671. The event was dominated by Michael Dunlop winning the Superbike TT race, Supersport TT Races 1 & 2, the Superstock TT and the Joey Dunlop TT Championship with 120 points from John McGuinness and Bruce Anstey in third place. The Sidecar TT race produced a maiden Isle of Man TT wins for the two former Sidecar World Champions with Tim Reeves / Dan Sayle winning Sidecar TT Race 1 and Ben Birchall / Tom Birchall winning Sidecar TT Race 2. The Lightweight TT for 650cc twin-cylinder motor-cycles produced another maiden win for James Hillier and Michael Rutter scored a hattrick or wins in the TT Zero class for electric powered motor-cycles after winning for the third consecutive year.

The Senior TT race was red-flagged on the first lap after Isle of Man TT newcomer Jonathan Howarth crashed at the bottom of Bray Hill and 10 spectators were injured in the incident.

News was also made when James May completed a lap on a sidecar outfit built entirely from meccano. This was televised as part of his Toy Stories series.

== Practice Week ==
The first part of practice week was dominated by inclement weather with Monday and the Wednesday evening practice run as untimed sessions. The Tuesday session cancelled due to heavy rain showers and the Friday evening was session red-flagged for 50 minutes for the Isle of Man Fire Service to attend a house fire in Kirk Michael village. To provide sufficient practice for competitors the first part of Saturday race day was run as an extended practice session. The first race of the 2013 Isle of Man TT races was the rescheduled Sidecar TT Race 1 and the Superbike TT held over to next day and run on Sunday afternoon for the first time since 2005.

The Japanese competitor Yoshinari Matsushita crashed fatally at Ballacrye Corner near Ballaugh during the Monday evening practice causing the session to be abandoned.

== Practice Times ==
=== Practice Times & Leaderboard Superbike/Senior TT ===
Plates; Black on White/Black on Yellow.

Rank	Rider	Sat 25 May	Mon 27 May	Tues 28 May	Wed 29 May	Thurs 30 May	Fri 31 May	Sat 1 June
1	(Northern Ireland) Michael Dunlop; 999cc Honda	—— No Time	Untimed; Session	Cancelled; No Time	Untimed; Session	17' 44.011; 127.657 mph	17' 36.879; 128.518 mph	17' 17.688; 130.890 mph
2	(England) John McGuinness; 999cc Honda	—— No Time	Untimed; Session	Cancelled; No Time	Untimed; Session	17' 30.299; 129.323 mph	18' 22.397; 123.212 mph	17' 23.982; 130.110 mph
3	(England) Gary Johnson; 1000cc Honda	—— No Time	Untimed; Session	Cancelled; No Time	Untimed; Session	17' 59.967; 125.771 mph	18' 04.982; 128.518 mph	17' 27.968; 129.610 mph
4	(New Zealand) Bruce Anstey; 1000cc Honda	—— No Time	Untimed; Session	Cancelled; No Time	Untimed; Session	17' 31.323; 129.144 mph	18' 32.176; 122.128 mph	17' 43.000; 127.780 mph
5	(England) Guy Martin; 1000cc Suzuki	—— No Time	Untimed; Session	Cancelled; No Time	Untimed; Session	17' 41.777; 127.925 mph	—— No Time	17' 35.547; 128.680 mph
6	(England) Michael Rutter; 999cc Honda	—— No Time	Untimed; Session	Cancelled; No Time	Untimed; Session	17' 41.132; 128.003 mph	18' 26.383; 122.768 mph	17' 35.888; 128.640 mph
7	(England) James Hillier; 1000cc Kawasaki	—— No Time	Untimed; Session	Cancelled; No Time	Untimed; Session	18' 16.861; 123.833 mph	18' 16.005; 123.930 mph	17' 40.012; 128.138 mph
8	(Isle of Man) Conor Cummins; 1000cc Yamaha	—— No Time	Untimed; Session	Cancelled; No Time	Untimed; Session	18' 22.638; 123.185 mph	18' 26.742; 122.728 mph	17' 46.664; 129.323 mph
9	(Northern Ireland) William Dunlop; 1000cc Yamaha	—— No Time	Untimed; Session	Cancelled; No Time	Untimed; Session	18' 23.126; 125.771 mph	18' 07.885; 124.855 mph	17' 56.889; 126.130 mph
10	(Australia) Cameron Donald; 1000cc Honda	—— No Time	Untimed; Session	Cancelled; No Time	Untimed; Session	17' 49.811; 126.964 mph	18' 16.249; 123.903 mph	17' 58.914; 125.890 mph

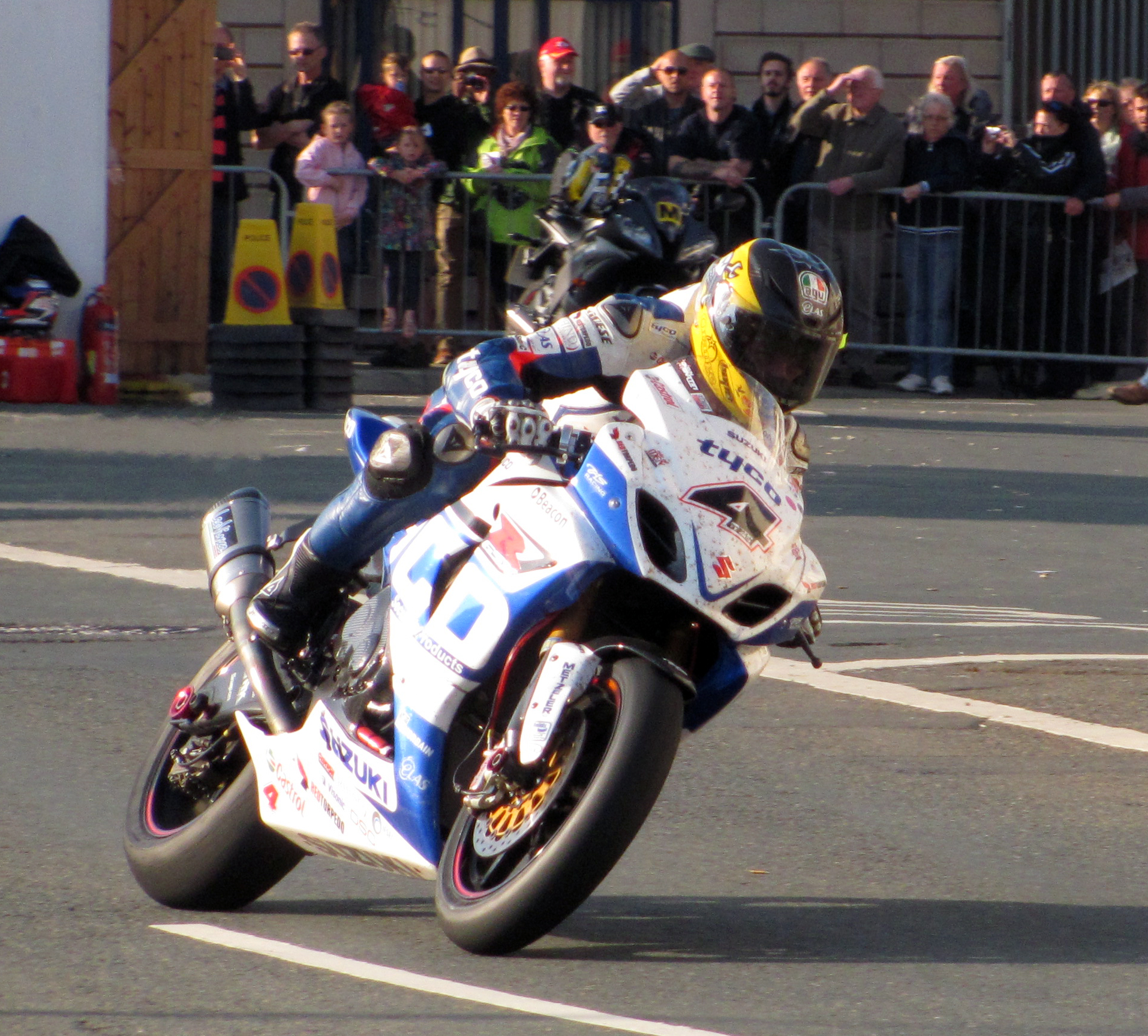
Guy Martin during practice

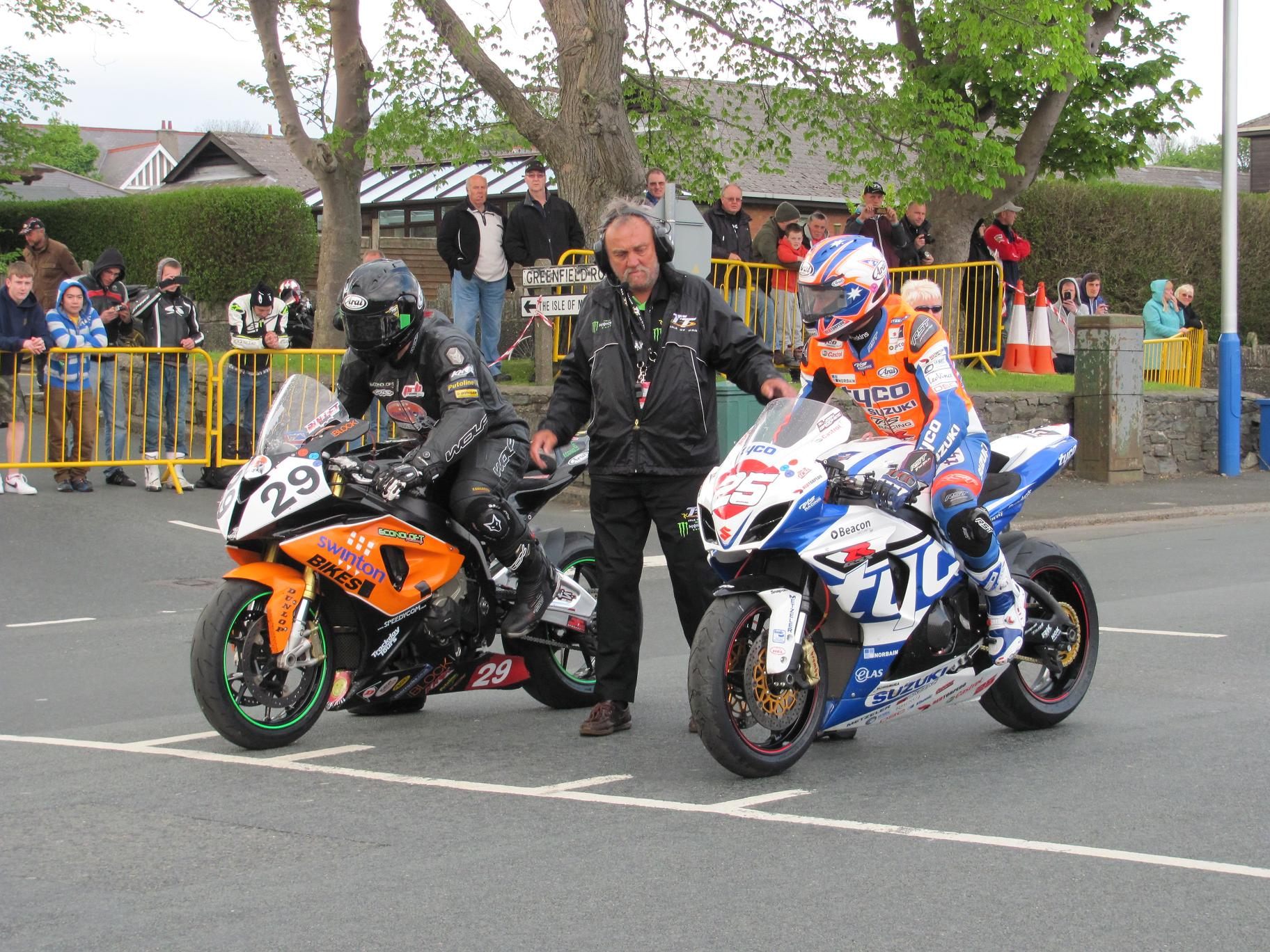
Rob Barker (#29) and Josh Brookes (#24) at the start of a practice session

=== Practice Times & Leaderboard Superstock TT ===
Plates; Red.

Rank	Rider	Sat 25 May	Mon 27 May	Tues 28 May	Wed 29 May	Thurs 30 May	Fri 31 May	Sat 1 June
1	(England) Guy Martin; 1000cc Suzuki	—— No Time	Untimed; Session	Cancelled; No Time	Untimed; Session	—— No Time	18' 30.901; 122.268 mph	17' 49.317; 127.23 mph
2	(England) Michael Rutter; 1000cc Honda	—— No Time	Untimed; Session	Cancelled; No Time	Untimed; Session	—— No Time	19' 06.885; 118.432 mph	18' 04.472; 125.248 mph
3	(Northern Ireland) Shaun Anderson; 1000cc Suzuki	—— No Time	Untimed; Session	Cancelled; No Time	Untimed; Session	—— No Time	—— No Time	18' 05.272; 125.156 mph
4	(England) Steve Mercer; 1000cc BMW	—— No Time	Untimed; Session	Cancelled; No Time	Untimed; Session	—— No Time	—— No Time	18' 05.639; 125.113 mph
5	(England) Gary Johnson; 1000cc Kawasaki	—— No Time	Untimed; Session	Cancelled; No Time	Untimed; Session	18' 05.639; 125.113 mph	—— No Time	18' 14.555; 124.090 mph
6	(England) John McGuinness; 1000cc Honda	—— No Time	Untimed; Session	Cancelled; No Time	Untimed; Session	18' 21.811; 123.277 mph	—— No Time	18' 15.169; 124.25 mph
7	(England) Dean Harrison; 1000cc Kawasaki	—— No Time	Untimed; Session	Cancelled; No Time	Untimed; Session	19' 20.478; 117.045 mph	—— No Time	18' 16.423; 123.883 mph
8	(England) Simon Andrews; 1000cc Honda	—— No Time	Untimed; Session	Cancelled; No Time	Untimed; Session	18' 24.662; 125.771 mph	18' 59.631; 119.19 mph	18' 16.780; 123.843 mph
9	(England) Ben Wylie; 1000cc BMW	—— No Time	Untimed; Session	Cancelled; No Time	Untimed; Session	—— No Time	—— No Time	18' 17.673; 123.742 mph
10	(England) James Hillier; 1000cc Kawasaki	—— No Time	Untimed; Session	Cancelled; No Time	Untimed; Session	18' 28.133; 122.574 mph	—— No Time	18' 19.584; 123.527 mph

=== Practice Times & Leaderboard Supersport Junior TT ===
Plates; Blue.

Rank	Rider	Sat 25 May	Mon 27 May	Tues 28 May	Wed 29 May	Thurs 30 May	Fri 31 May	Sat 1 June
1	(Northern Ireland) Michael Dunlop; 600cc Honda	—— No Time	Untimed; Session	Cancelled; No Time	Untimed; Session	18' 27.555; 122.671 mph	—— No Time	18' 05.355; 125.146 mph
2	(England) John McGuinness; 600cc Honda	—— No Time	Untimed; Session	Cancelled; No Time	Untimed; Session	—— No Time	—— No Time	18' 13.797; 124.180 mph
3	(New Zealand) Bruce Anstey; 600cc Honda	—— No Time	Untimed; Session	Cancelled; No Time	Untimed; Session	18' 32.436; 122.100 mph	—— No Time	18' 14.616; 124.087 mph
4	(Northern Ireland) William Dunlop; 600cc Yamaha	—— No Time	Untimed; Session	Cancelled; No Time	Untimed; Session	18' 30.985; 122.259 mph	18' 56.426; 119.522 mph	18' 15.394; 123.999 mph
5	(England) Guy Martin; 600cc Suzuki	—— No Time	Untimed; Session	Cancelled; No Time	Untimed; Session	18' 31.214; 122.234 mph	—— No Time	18' 16.371; 123.889 mph
6	(England) Gary Johnson; 600cc MV Agusta	—— No Time	Untimed; Session	Cancelled; No Time	Untimed; Session	18' 46.178; 120.610 mph	19' 17.693; 117.326 mph	18' 19.682; 123.682 mph
7	(Australia) Cameron Donald; 600cc Honda	—— No Time	Untimed; Session	Cancelled; No Time	Untimed; Session	18' 33.584; 121.974 mph	—— No Time	18' 31.459; 122.207 mph
8	(England) Dean Harrison; 600cc Yamaha	—— No Time	Untimed; Session	Cancelled; No Time	Untimed; Session	—— No Time	—— No Time	18' 32.407; 122.103 mph
9	(England) Daniel Cooper; 675cc Triumph	—— No Time	Untimed; Session	Cancelled; No Time	Untimed; Session	—— No Time	—— No Time	18' 33.046; 122.033 mph
10	(England) Dan Stewart; 600cc Honda	—— No Time	Untimed; Session	Cancelled; No Time	Untimed; Session	—— No Time	—— No Time	18' 33.596; 121.972 mph

=== Practice Times and Leaderboard 600cc Sidecar TT ===
Rank	Rider	Sat 25 May	Mon 27 May	Tues 28 May	Wed 29 May	Thurs 30 May	Fri 31 May	Mon 3 June
1	(Isle of Man) Dave Molyneux / (England) Patrick Farrance; DMR Kawasaki 600cc	20' 20.621; 111.280 mph	Untimed; Session	Cancelled; No Time	Untimed; Session	19' 56.112; 113.560 mph	19' 51.425; 114.005 mph	20' 06.611; 112.570 mph
2	(England) Tim Reeves / (Isle of Man) Daniel Sayle; LCR 600cc	—— No Time	Untimed; Session	Cancelled; No Time	Untimed; Session	20' 00.463; 113.146 mph	20' 06.980; 112.540 mph	21' 24.694; 105.730 mph
3	(England) John Holden/ (England) Andrew Winkle; LCR 600cc	20' 34.689; 110.010 mph	Untimed; Session	Cancelled; No Time	Untimed; Session	20' 06.980; 112.535 mph	20' 22.733; 111.090 mph	—— No Time
4	(England) Ben Birchall / (England) Tom Birchall; LCR 600cc	20' 41.322; 109.420 mph	Untimed; Session	Cancelled; No Time	Untimed; Session	20' 10.734; 112.186 mph	—— No Time	—— No Time
5	(England) Conrad Harrison / (England) Mike Aylott; Shelbourne Honda 600cc	20' 35.270; 109.960 mph	Untimed; Session	Cancelled; No Time	Untimed; Session	20' 10.767; 112.183 mph	20' 10.767; 112.183 mph	20' 15.525; 111.740 mph
6	(England) Douglas Wright / (England) Martin Hull; Baker Honda 600cc	20' 55.813; 108.160 mph	Untimed; Session	Cancelled; No Time	Untimed; Session	20' 34.876; 109.990 mph	20' 29.307; 110.492 mph	—— No Time
7	(England) Gary Bryan / (England) Jamie Winn; Baker Honda 600cc	20' 56.002; 108.140 mph	Untimed; Session	Cancelled; No Time	Untimed; Session	20' 42.970; 109.280 mph	20' 43.969; 109.190 mph	20' 39.136; 109.620 mph
8	(Isle of Man) Karl Bennett / (Isle of Man) Lee Cain; Kawasaki 600cc	—— No Time	Untimed; Session	Cancelled; No Time	Untimed; Session	Cancelled; No Time	20' 10.767; 112.183 mph	20' 47.877; 108.850 mph
9	(France) Frank Lelias / (England) Charlie Richardson; Suzuki 600cc	21' 38.546; 104.600 mph	Untimed; Session	Cancelled; No Time	Untimed; Session	21' 04.348; 107.430 mph	20' 13.052; 106.690 mph	20' 48.387; 108.803 mph
10	(England) Gary Knight / (England) Dan Knight; DMR Kawasaki 600cc	21' 35.493; 104.850 mph	Untimed; Session	Cancelled; No Time	Untimed; Session	21' 03.164; 107.530 mph	32' 01.776; 70.680 mph	20' 55.461; 108.190 mph

== Race results ==
=== 2013 Sidecar TT Race 1 TT final standings ===
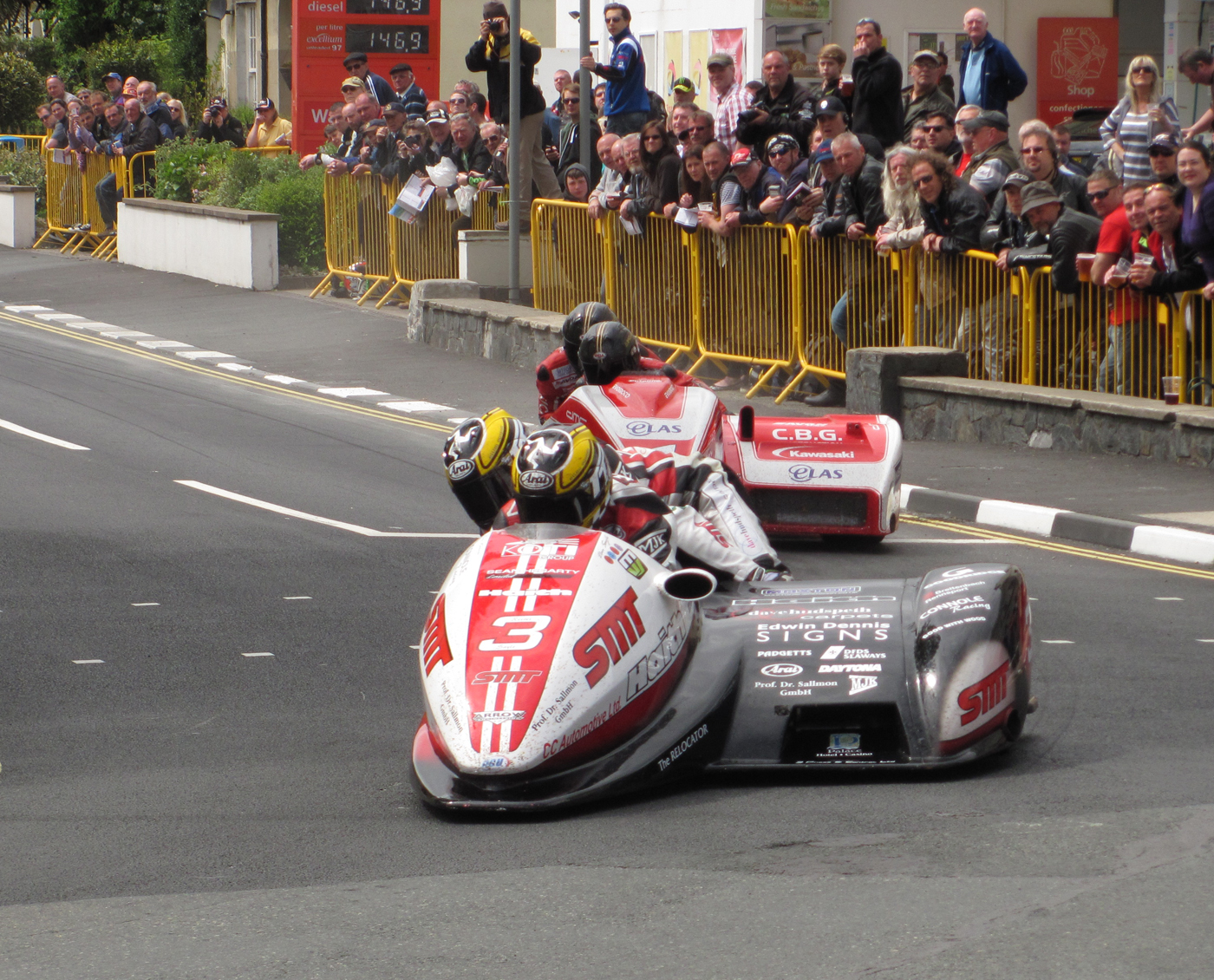
Sidecar TT Race 1 winners Tim Reeves and Daniel Sayle

1 June 2013 3 Laps (113.00 Miles) TT Mountain Course.

Rank	Rider	Team	Speed	Time
1	(England) Tim Reeves / (Isle of Man) Daniel Sayle	LCR 600cc	113.728 mph	59' 42.957
2	(England) Conrad Harrison / (England) Mike Aylott	Shelbourne Honda 600cc	113.093 mph	1:00.03.074
3	(Isle of Man) Dave Molyneux / (England) Patrick Farrance	DMR Kawasaki 600cc	113.077 mph	1:00.03.612
4	(England) John Holden / (England) Andrew Winkle	LCR 600cc	112.189 mph	1:00.32.189
5	(England) Douglas Wright / (England) Martin Hull	Baker Honda 600cc	111.426 mph	1:00.56.999
6	(England) Gary Bryan / (England) Jamie Winn	Baker Honda 600cc	111.067 mph	1:01.08.797
7	(England) Gary Knight / (England) Dan Knight	DMR Kawasaki 600cc	109.131 mph	1:02.13.895
8	(Isle of Man) Karl Bennett / (Isle of Man) Lee Cain	Kawasaki 600cc	108.876 mph	1:02.22.626
9	(England) Robert Handcock / (England) Basil Bevan	Shelbourne Honda 600cc	108.633 mph	1:02.31.013
10	(France) Frank Lelias / (England) Charlie Richardson	Suzuki 600cc	108.047 mph	1:02.51.347

Fastest Lap: Tim Reeves/Daniel Sayle – 114.608 mph (19' 45.158 ) on lap 2.

=== 2013 Superbike TT final standings ===
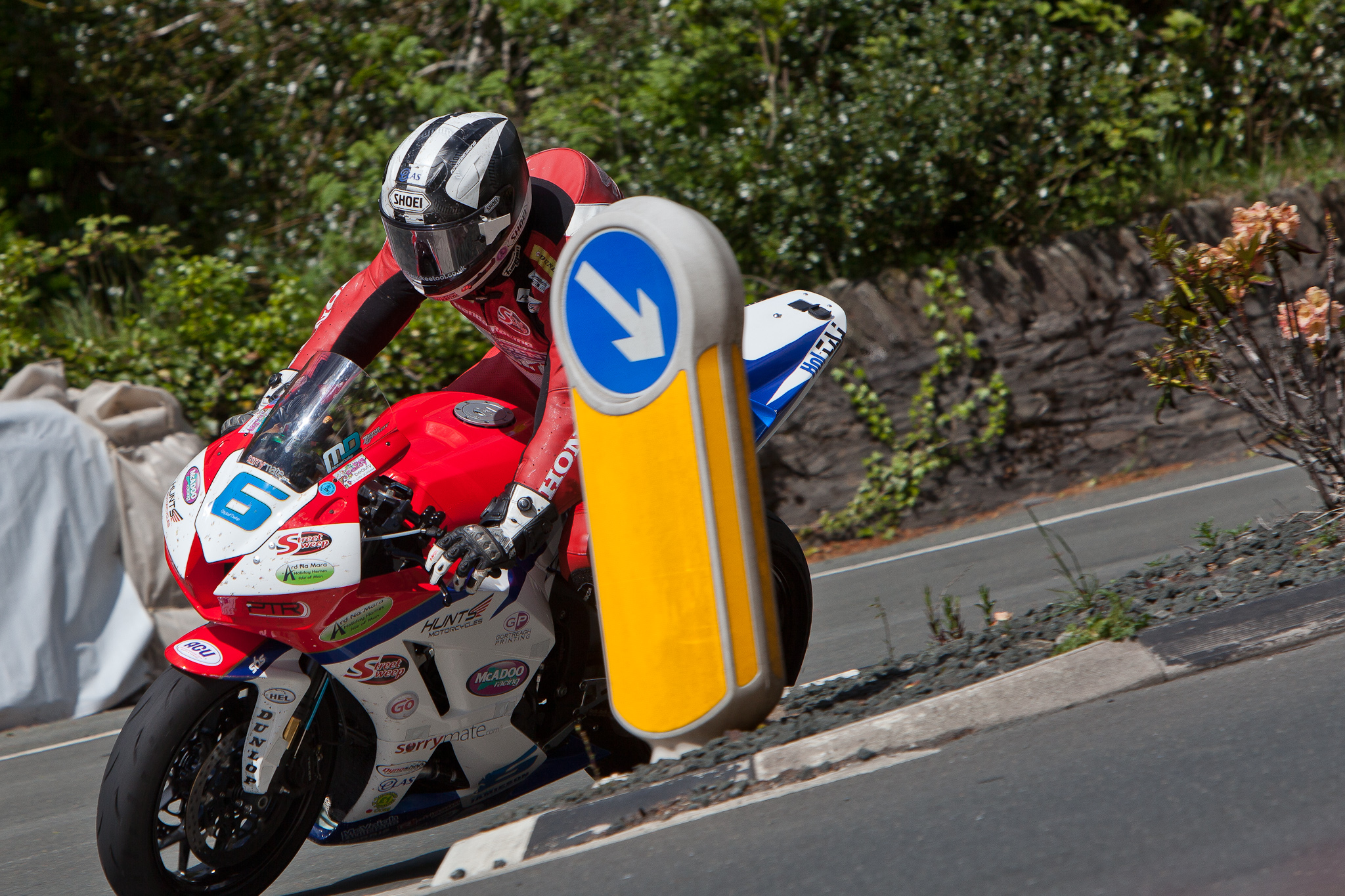
Michael Dunlop(pictured in practice) won 4 races, including the Superbike TT

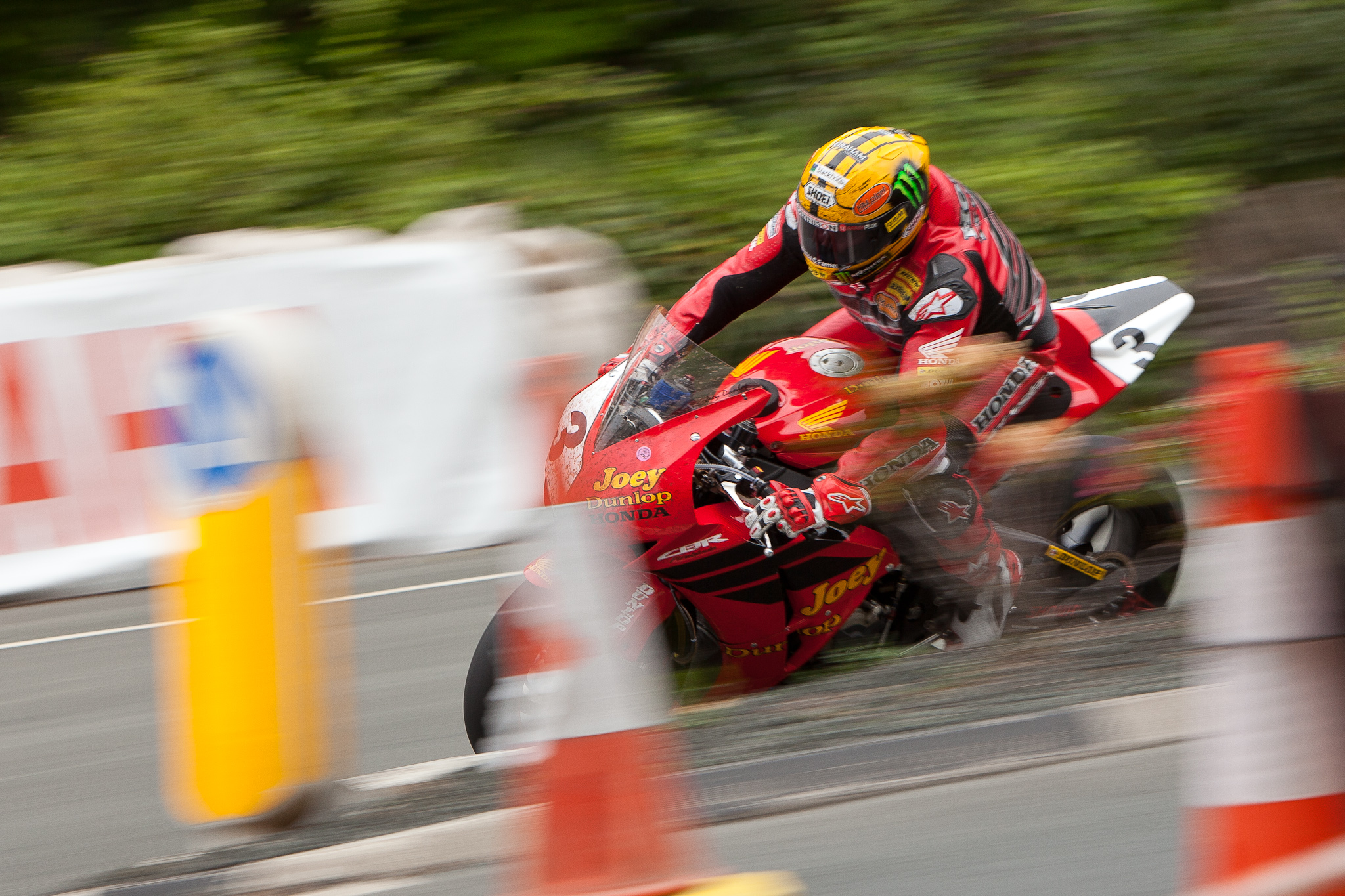
John McGuinness set a new lap record at the end of the Superbike TT

2 June 2013 6 Laps (236.38 Miles) TT Mountain Course.

Rank	Rider	Team	Speed	Time
1	(Northern Ireland) Michael Dunlop	Honda 1000cc	128.747 mph	1:45.29.980
2	(Australia) Cameron Donald	Honda 1000cc	127.920 mph	1:46.10.917
3	(England) John McGuinness	Honda 1000cc	127.102 mph	1:46.51.907
4	(England) Guy Martin	Suzuki 1000cc	126.964 mph	1:46.58.894
5	(Isle of Man) Conor Cummins	Yamaha 1000cc	126.333 mph	1:47.30.929
6	(England) Michael Rutter	Honda 1000cc	126.260 mph	1:47.34.670
7	(England) James Hillier	Kawasaki 1000cc	126.063 mph	1:47.44.791
8	(New Zealand) Bruce Anstey	Honda 1000cc	125.690 mph	1:48.03.974
9	(Northern Ireland) William Dunlop	Yamaha 1000cc	124.642 mph	1:48.58.482
10	(Australia) Josh Brookes	Suzuki 1000cc	123.863 mph	1:49.39.593

Fastest Lap and New Overall Course Record: John McGuinness – 131.671 mph (17' 11.572) on lap 6.

=== 2013 Supersport Junior TT Race 1 ===
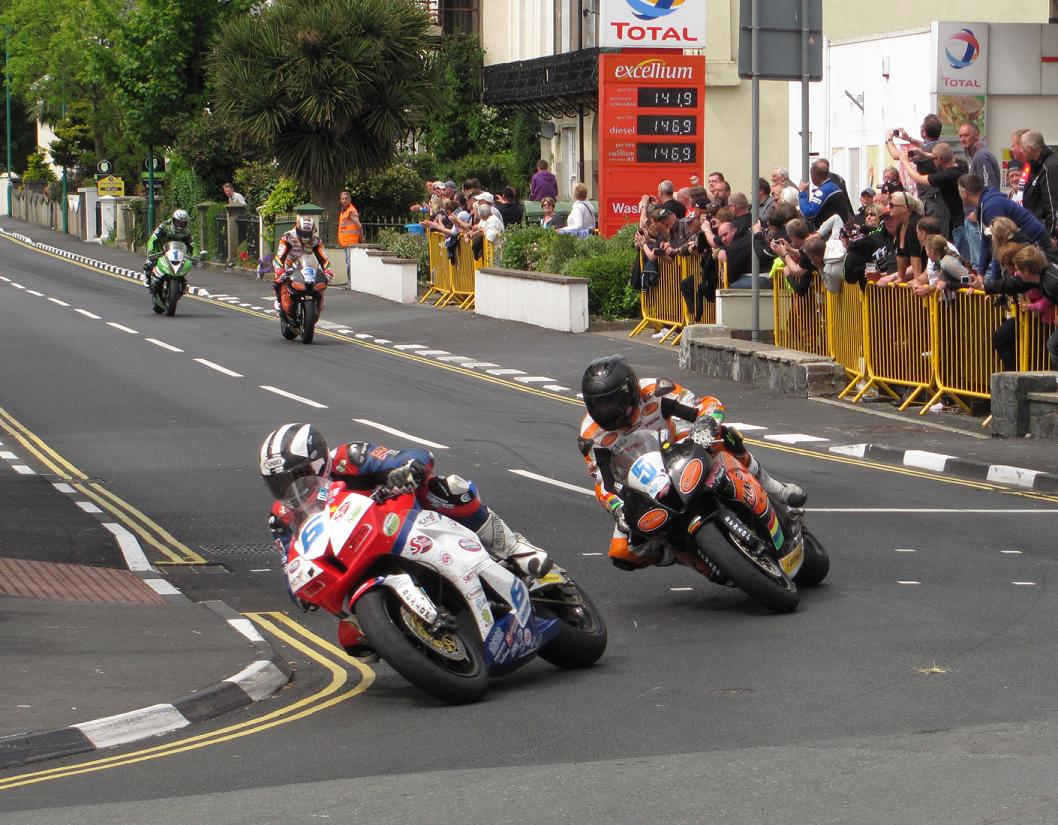
Junior TT Race 1 winner Michael Dunlop in front of Bruce Anstey

3 June 2013 4 Laps (150.73 Miles) TT Mountain Course.

Rank	Rider	Team	Speed	Time
1	(Northern Ireland) Michael Dunlop	Honda 599cc	125.182 mph	1:12.20.162
2	(New Zealand) Bruce Anstey	Honda 600cc	124.884 mph	1:12.30.520
3	(Northern Ireland) William Dunlop	Yamaha 600cc	124.510 mph	1:12.43.602
4	(England) John McGuinness	Honda 600cc	124.306 mph	1:12.50.749
5	(England) James Hillier	Kawasaki 600cc	123.668 mph	1:13.13.320
6	(England) Guy Martin	Suzuki 600cc	123.540 mph	1:13.17.846
7	(Australia) Cameron Donald	Honda 600cc	123.005 mph	1:13.36.985
8	(England) Dean Harrison	Honda 600cc	122.716 mph	1:13.47.386
9	(England) Dan Stewart	Yamaha 600cc	Honda mph	1:14.46.332
10	(England) Daniel Cooper	Triumph 675cc	120.359 mph	1:15.14.098

Fastest Lap: Michael Dunlop – 127.525 mph (17' 45.111) on lap 2.

=== 2013 Superstock TT Race final standings ===
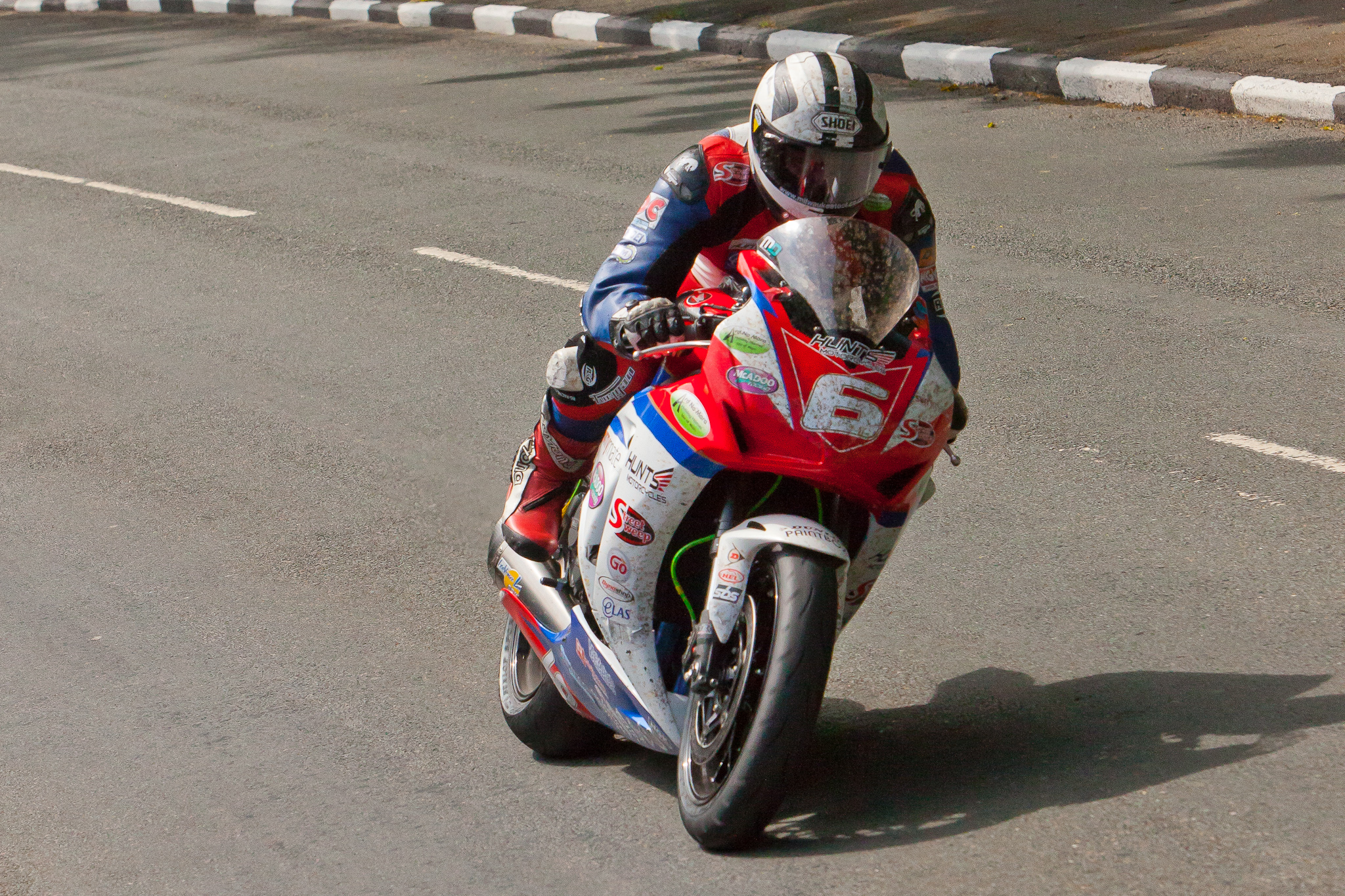
Michael Dunlop during the Superstock TT

3 June 2013 4 Laps (150.73 Miles) TT Mountain Course.

Rank	Rider	Team	Speed	Time
1	(Northern Ireland) Michael Dunlop	Honda 1000cc	128.218 mph	1:10.37.404
2	(England) Gary Johnson	Kawasaki 1000cc	127.718 mph	1:10.53.981
3	(England) John McGuinness	Honda 1000cc	126.817 mph	1:11.24.207
4	(England) Dean Harrison	Kawasaki 1000cc	126.221 mph	1:11.44.459
5	(New Zealand) Bruce Anstey	Honda 1000cc	125.857 mph	1:11.56.895
6	(England) James Hillier	Kawasaki 1000cc	124.505 mph	1:12.43.778
7	(England) Michael Rutter	Honda 1000cc	123.915 mph	1:13.04.550
8	(England) Steve Mercer	BMW 1000cc	123.501 mph	1:13.19.265
9	(Northern Ireland) William Dunlop	Yamaha 1000cc	123.476 mph	1:13.20.125
10	(England) Ben Wylie	BMW 1000cc	122.546 mph	1:13.53.523

Fastest Lap: Michael Dunlop – 131.220 mph (17' 15.114) on lap 4.

=== 2013 TT Zero Race ===
5 June 2013 1 Lap (37.73 Miles) TT Mountain Course.

Rank	Rider	Team	Speed	Time
1	(England) Michael Rutter	MotoCzysz	109.675 mph	20' 38.461
2	(England) John McGuinness	Honda Mugen Shinden	109.527 mph	20' 40.133
3	(England) Rob Barber	RW-2 / Ohio State University	90.403 mph	25' 02.467
4	(Scotland) George Spence	Kingston University	88.096 mph	25' 41.822
5	(England) Chris McGahan	Yamaha R6E	83.857 mph	26' 59.755
6	(Wales) Ian Lougher	Komatti-Mirai Racing	81.515 mph	27' 46.300
7	(Isle of Man) David Madsen-Mygdal	Imperial	71.983 mph	31' 26.933
8	(Wales) Paul Owen	Brunel BX/Brunel University	71.738 mph	31' 33.387

- (10 Starters)

Fastest Lap and New Race Record: Michael Rutter – 109.675 mph (20' 38.461) on lap 1.

=== 2013 Supersport Junior TT Race 2 ===
5 June 2013 4 Laps (150.73 Miles) TT Mountain Course.

Rank	Rider	Team	Speed	Time
1	(Northern Ireland) Michael Dunlop	Honda 599cc	125.997 mph	1:11.52.091
2	(New Zealand) Bruce Anstey	Honda 600cc	125.930 mph	1:11.54.404
3	(England) John McGuinness	Honda 600cc	124.731 mph	1:12.35.882
4	(Northern Ireland) William Dunlop	Yamaha 600cc	124.703 mph	1:12.36.849
5	(Australia) Cameron Donald	Honda 600cc	124.429 mph	1:12.46.450
6	(England) James Hillier	Kawasaki 600cc	123.712 mph	1:13.11.759
7	(England) Dean Harrison	Honda 600cc	123.086 mph	1:13.34.079
8	(England) Guy Martin	Suzuki 600cc	122.159 mph	1:14.07.563
9	(England) Gary Johnson	MV Agusta 600cc	122.139 mph	1:14.08.326
10	(Isle of Man) Conor Cummins	Yamaha 600cc	121.249 mph	1:14.40.951

Fastest Lap: Michael Dunlop – 128.667 mph (17' 35.659) on lap 2.

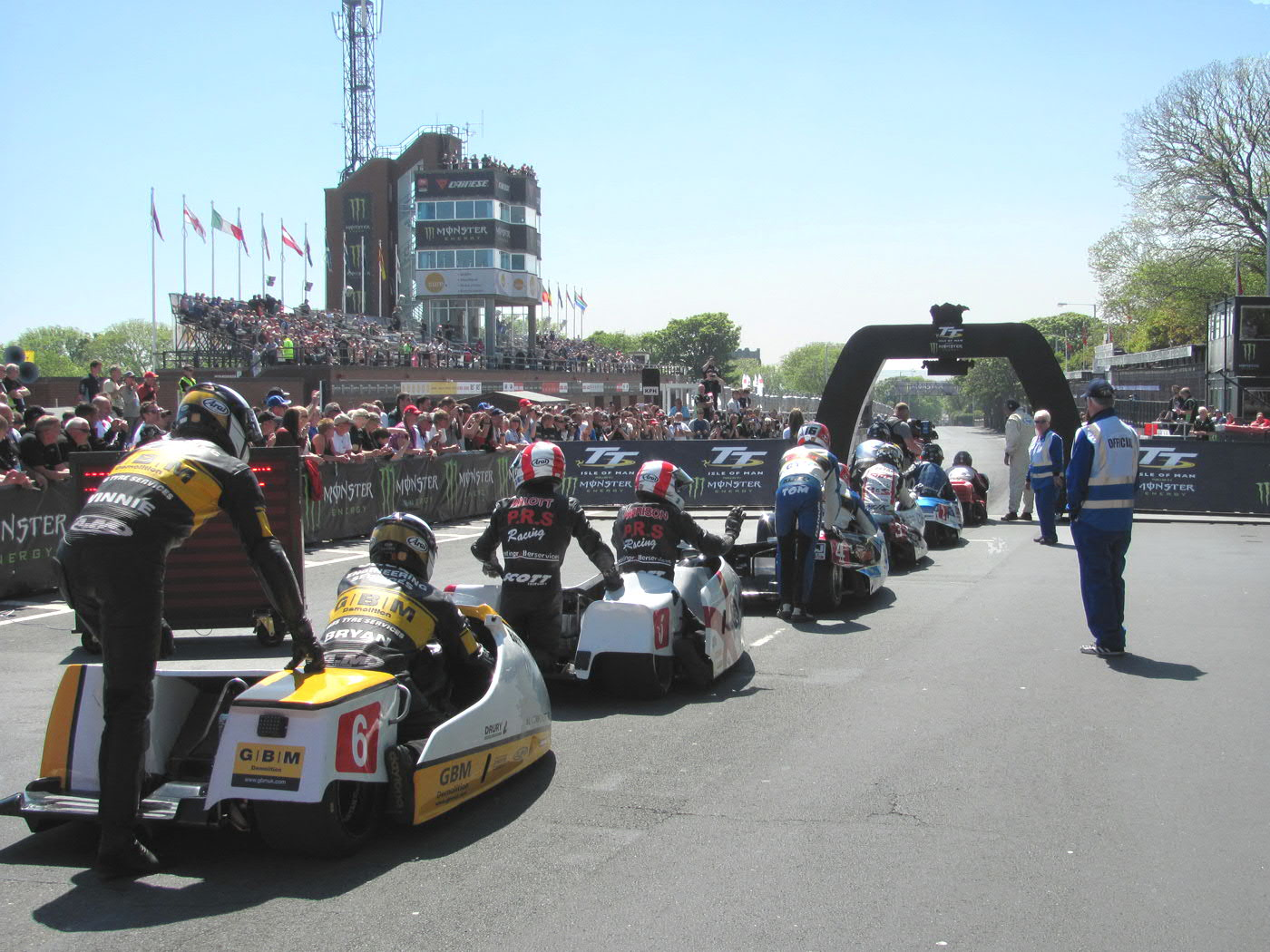
Start of the Sidecar TT Race 2

=== 2013 Sidecar TT Race 2 TT final standings ===
5 June 2013 3 Laps (113.00 Miles) TT Mountain Course.

Rank	Rider	Team	Speed	Time
1	(England) Ben Birchall / (England) Tom Birchall	LCR 600cc	114.387 mph	59' 22.340
2	(Isle of Man) Dave Molyneux / (England) Patrick Farrance	DMR Kawasaki 600cc	113.832 mph	59' 39.692
3	(England) Conrad Harrison / (England) Mike Aylott	Shelbourne Honda 600cc	113.145 mph	1:00.01.445
4	(England) John Holden / (England) Andrew Winkle	LCR 600cc	112.193 mph	1:00.31.976
5	(England) Gary Bryan / (England) Jamie Winn	Baker Honda 600cc	109.786 mph	1:01.51.637
6	(England) Gary Knight / (England) Dan Knight	DMR Kawasaki 600cc	109.078 mph	1:02.15.728
7	(France) Frank Lelias / (England) Charlie Richardson	Suzuki 600cc	109.042 mph	1:02.16.938
8	(United Kingdom) Wayne Lockey / (United Kingdom) Luke Capewell	Ireson Honda 600cc	106.805 mph	1:03.35.221
9	(United Kingdom) Dean Banks / (United Kingdom) Ken Edwards	LCR 600cc	106.576 mph	1:03.3.430
10	(Republic of Ireland) Mick Donovan / (Republic of Ireland) Aaron Galligan	Ireson Honda 600cc	106.574 mph	1:03.43.492

Fastest Lap: Ben Birchall / Tom Birchall – 114.662 mph (19' 44.598 ) on lap 2.

=== 2013 Lightweight TT 650cc Super-Twin ===
7 June 2013 3 Laps (113.00 Miles) TT Mountain Course

Rank	Rider	Team	Speed	Time
1	(England) James Hillier	Kawasaki 650cc	117.694 mph	57' 42.245
2	(England) Dean Harrison	Kawasaki 650cc	116.565 mph	58' 15.763
3	(Isle of Man) Conor Cummins	Kawasaki 650cc	115.798 mph	58' 38.909
4	(England) Ivan Lintin	Kawasaki 650cc	112.115 mph	58' 43.135
5	(Northern Ireland) Jamie Hamilton	Kawasaki 650cc	115.405 mph	58' 50.911
6	(England) Michael Rutter	Kawasaki 650cc	115.063 mph	59' 01.401
7	(Australia) Cameron Donald	Kawasaki 650cc	114.264 mph	59' 26.172
8	(England) Chris Palmer	Kawasaki 650cc	113.618 mph	59' 46.446
9	(England) Lee Johnston	Kawasaki 650cc	112.867 mph	1:00.10.310
10	(Wales) Ian Lougher	Kawasaki 650cc	112.094 mph	1:00.35.206

Fastest Lap: James Hillier – 115.554 mph (19' 00.168) on lap 3.

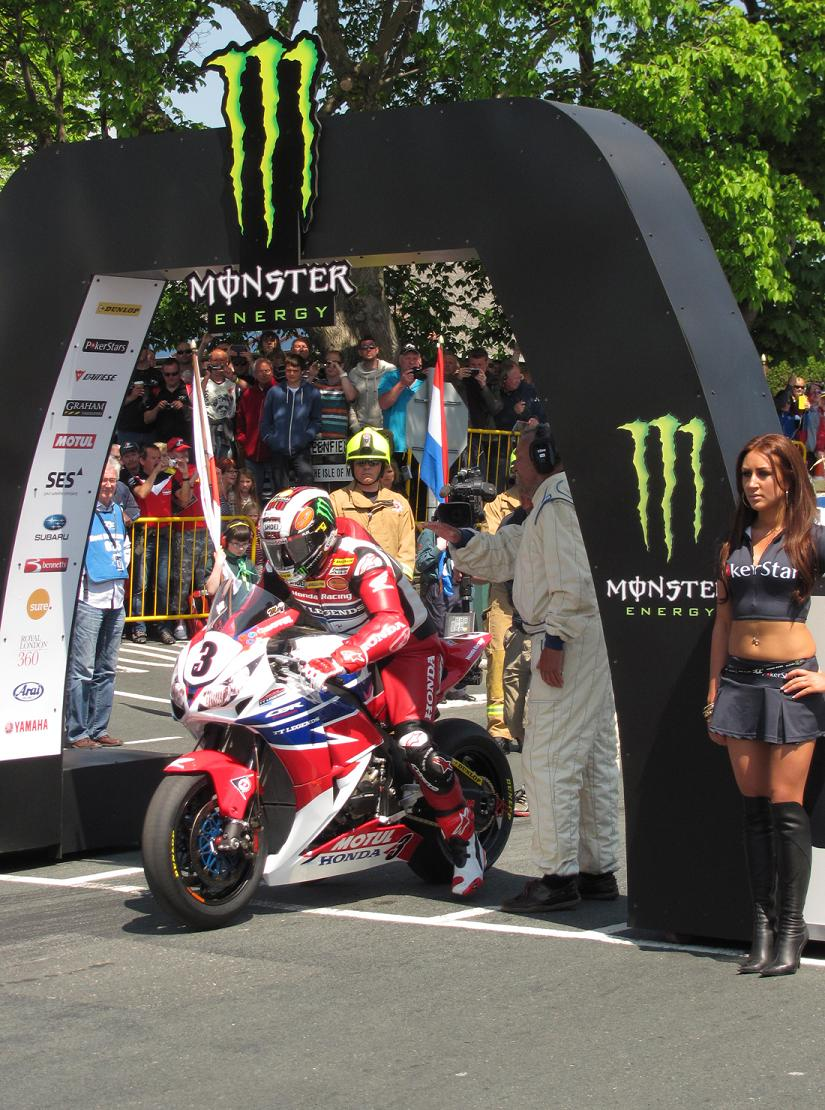
Senior TT winner John McGuinness at the start

=== 2013 Senior TT final standings ===
7 June 2013 6 Laps (236.38 Miles) TT Mountain Course.

Rank	Rider	Team	Speed	Time
1	(England) John McGuinness	Honda 1000cc	128.943 mph	1:45.20.394
2	(Northern Ireland) Michael Dunlop	Honda 1000cc	128.737 mph	1:45.30.486
3	(New Zealand) Bruce Anstey	Honda 1000cc	128.584 mph	1:45.37.999
4	(England) James Hillier	Kawasaki 1000cc	128.565 mph	1:45.38.977
5	(England) Guy Martin	Suzuki 1000cc	127.851 mph	1:46.14.371
6	(England) Michael Rutter	Honda 1000cc	127.435 mph	1:46.35.167
7	(Northern Ireland) William Dunlop	Yamaha 1000cc	126.716 mph	1:47.11.428
8	(England) Dean Harrison	Kawasaki 1000cc	127.102 mph	1:48.42.322
9	(England) Dan Stewart	Yamaha 1000cc	124.079 mph	1:49.28.127
10	(Australia) David Johnson	Kawasaki 1000cc	123.966 mph	1:49.34.111

Fastest Lap: Bruce Anstey – 131.531 mph (17' 12.671) on lap 6.

== See also ==
- Manx Grand Prix
- North West 200
- Ulster Grand Prix

== Gallery ==
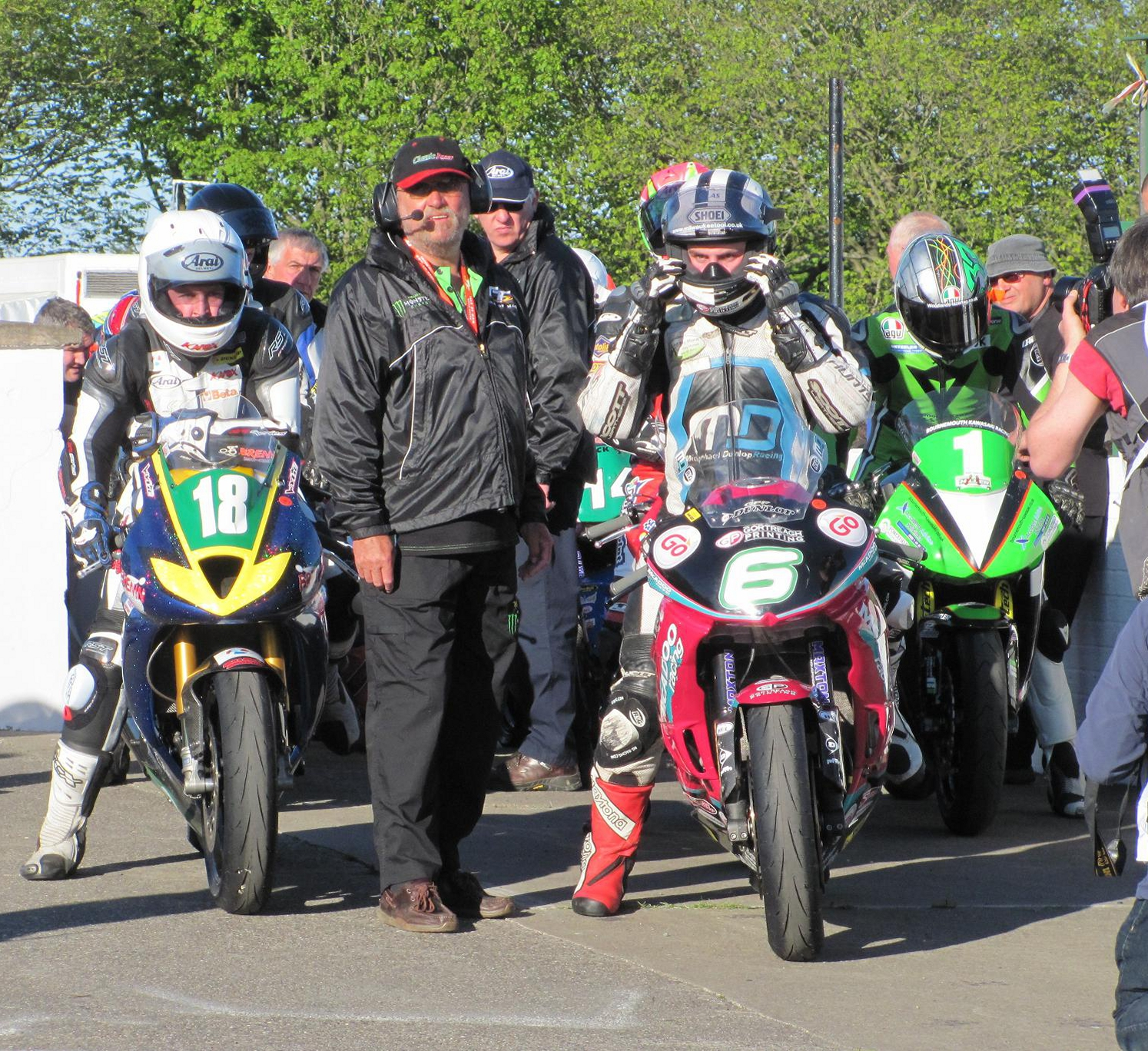
Isle of Man TT winner Michael Dunlop (6) 650cc Kawasaki leads away the first Lightweight TT Practice Session 25 May 2013

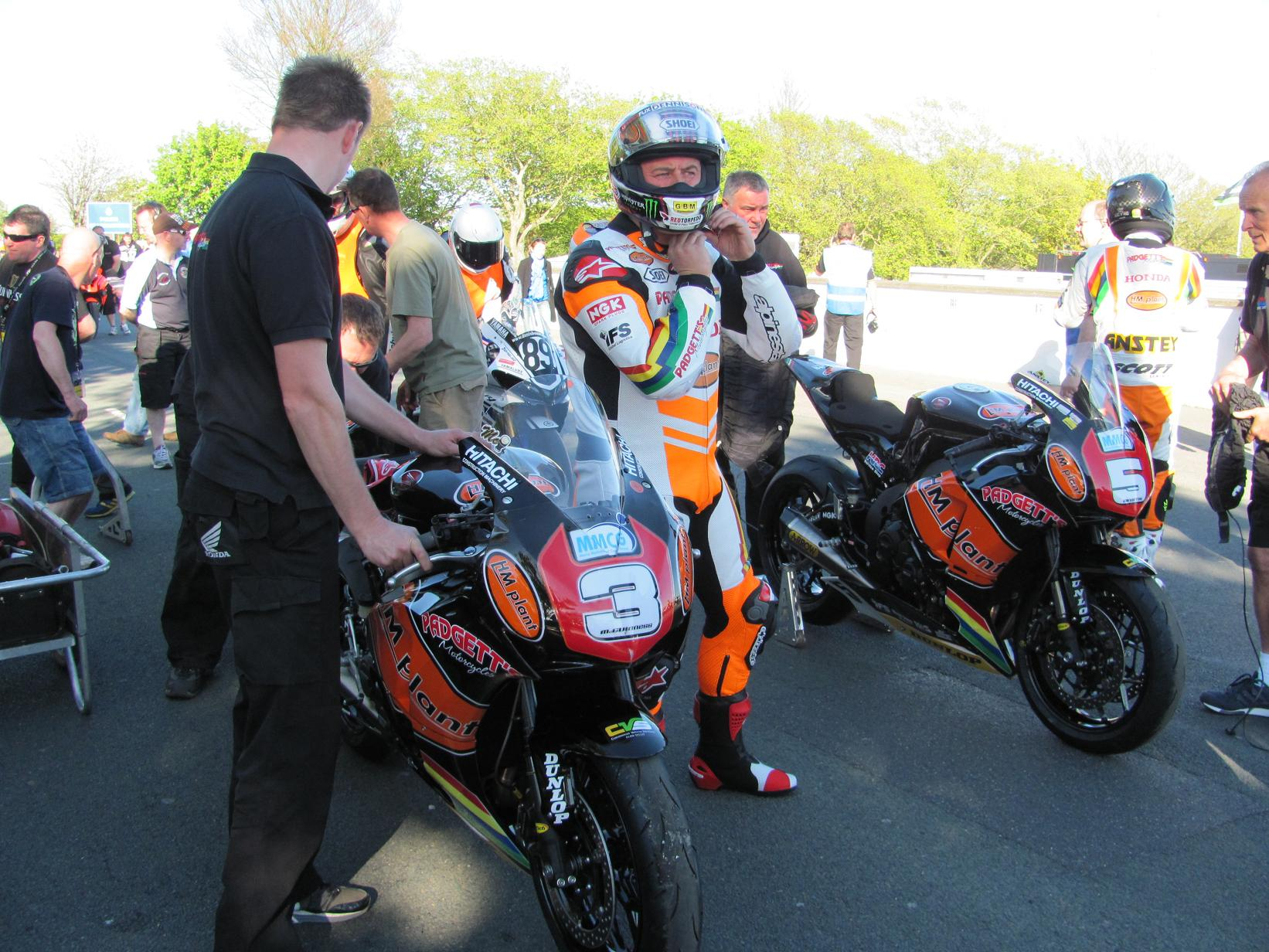
2013 Isle of Man TT — Start of the Newcomers Speed Control with Isle of Man TT winners John McGuinness (left) and Bruce Anstey (right) 25 May 2013

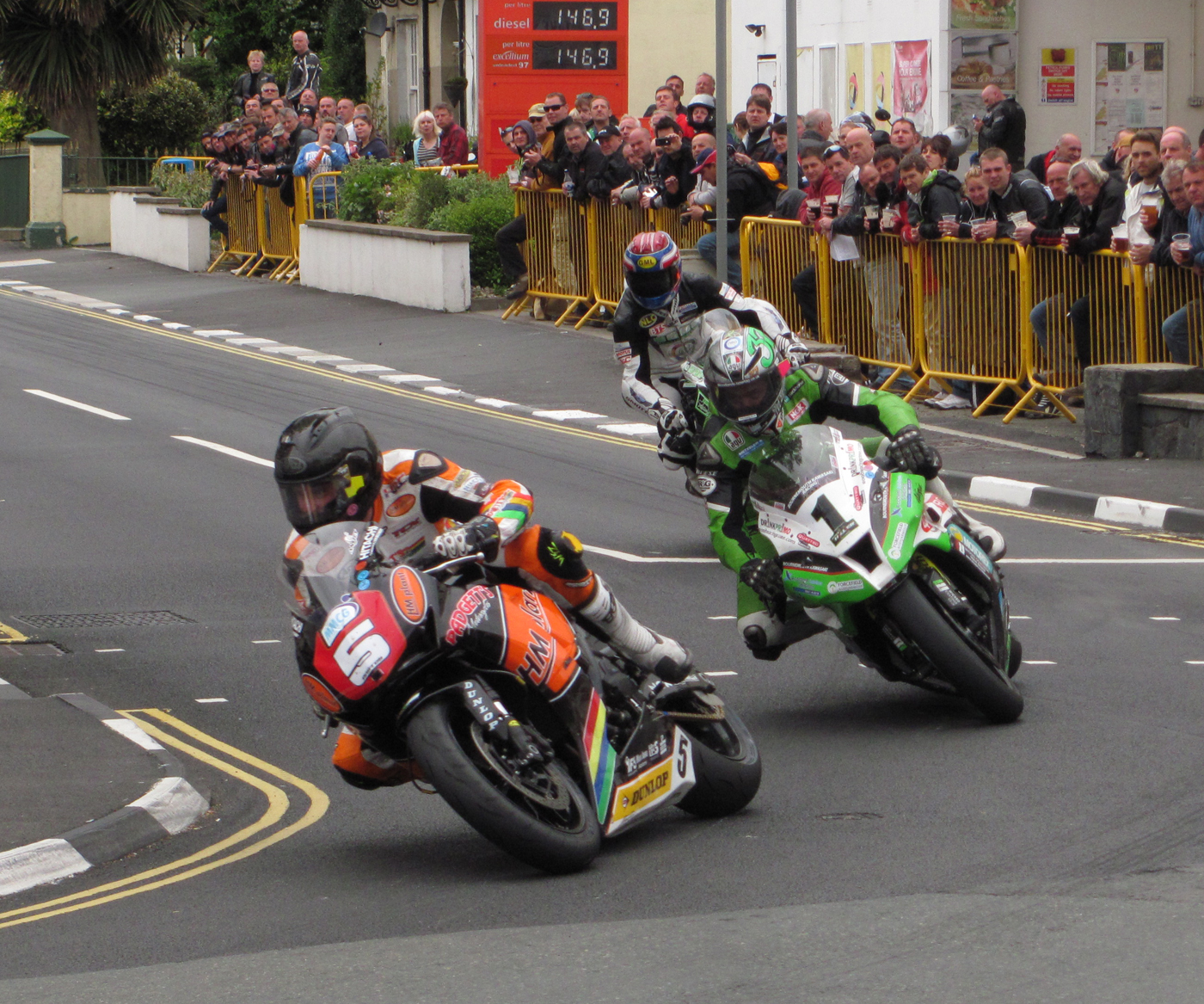
2013 Isle of Man TT Saturday afternoon practice — Bruce Anstey (5), James Hillier (1) & Gary Johnson (7); Parliament Square, Ramsey 1 June 2013.

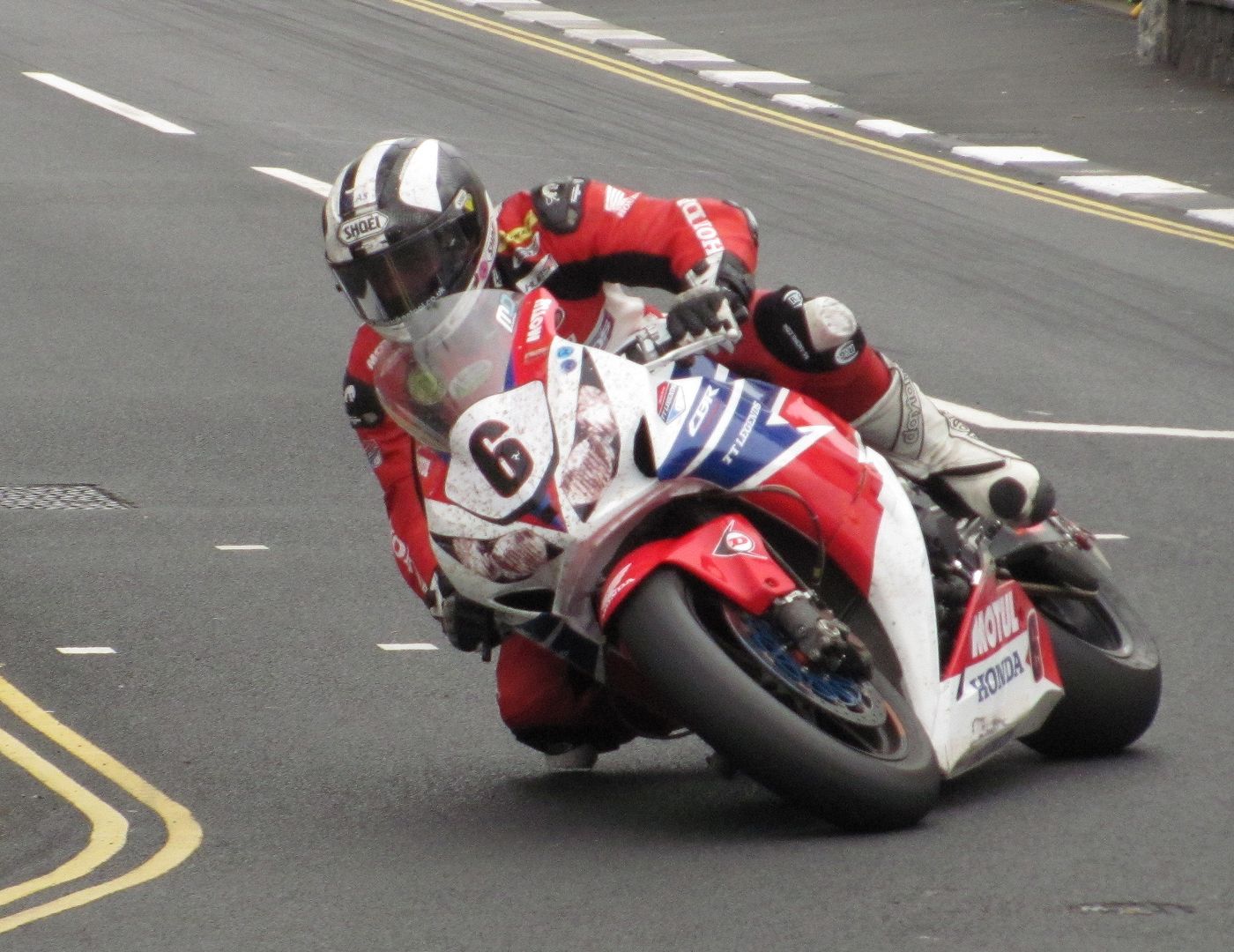
2013 Isle of Man TT Superbike Race Lap 6 – Michael Dunlop (6) 1000cc Honda Parliament Square, Ramsey 2 June 2013.

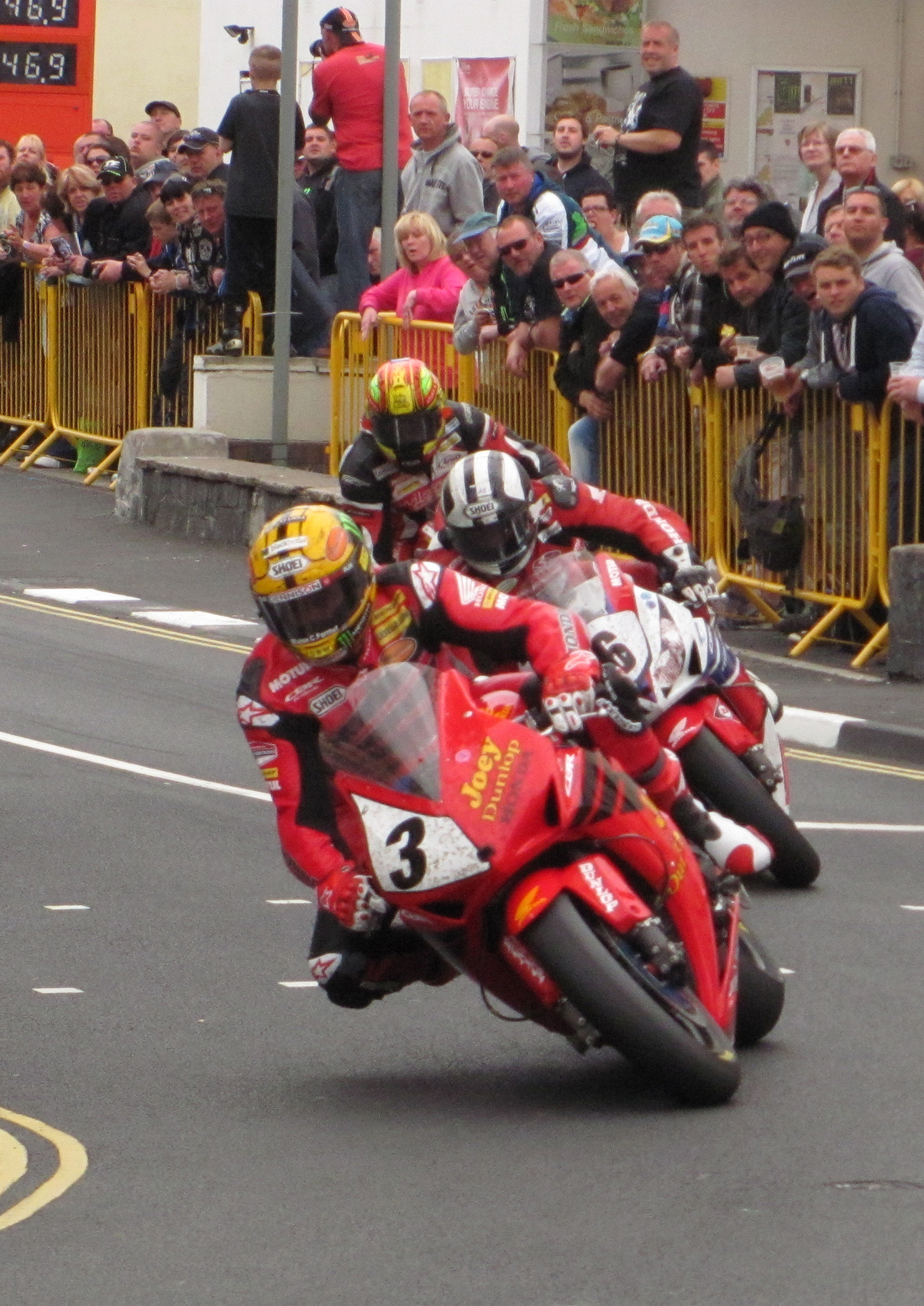
2013 Isle of Man TT Superbike Race Lap 4 – John McGuinness (3), Michael Dunlop (6) & Cameron Donald (2) Parliament Square, Ramsey 2 June 2013.

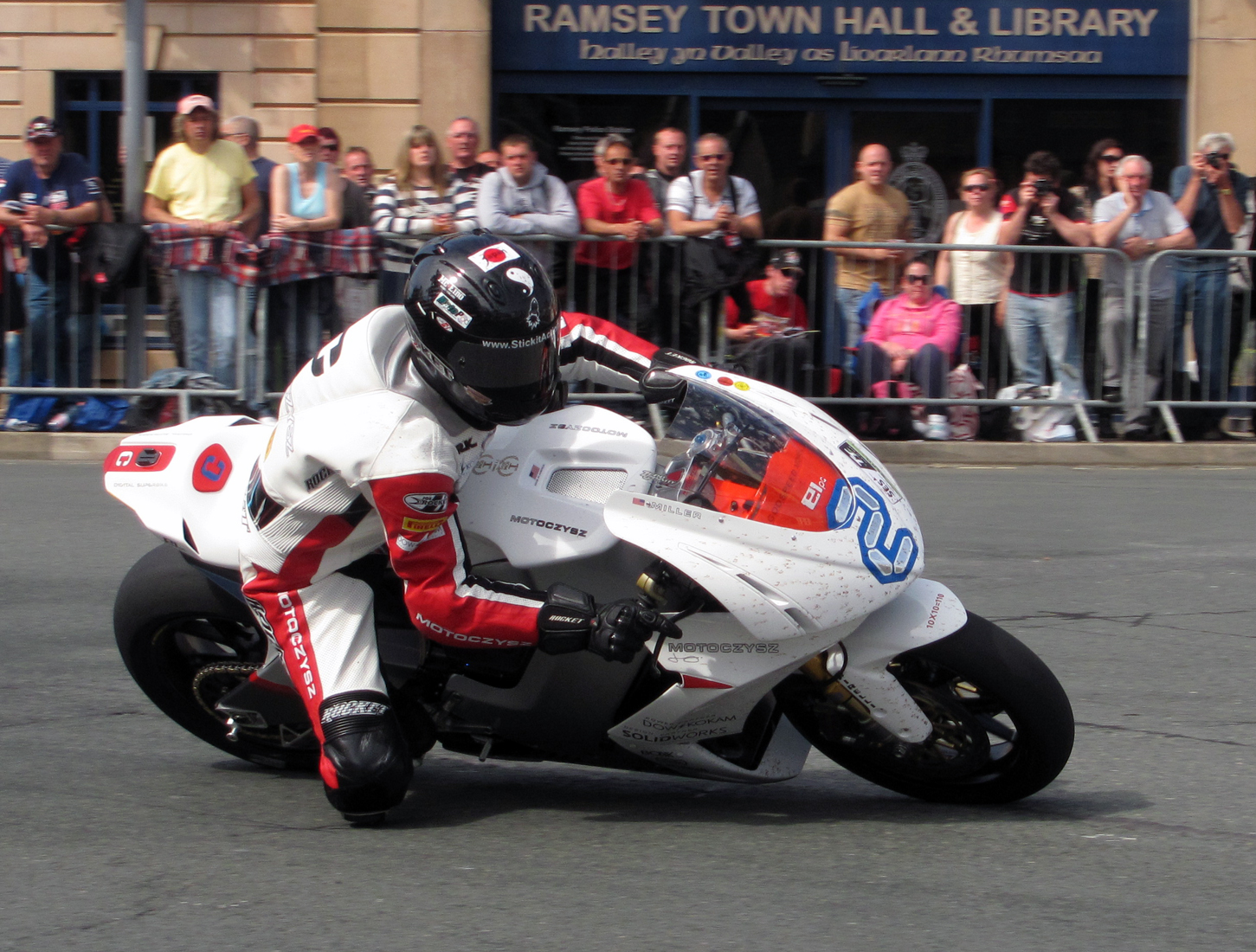
2013 Isle of Man TT TT Zero – Mark Miller(2) MotoCzysz E1pc Practice Session – Parliament Square, Ramsey 3 June 2013.

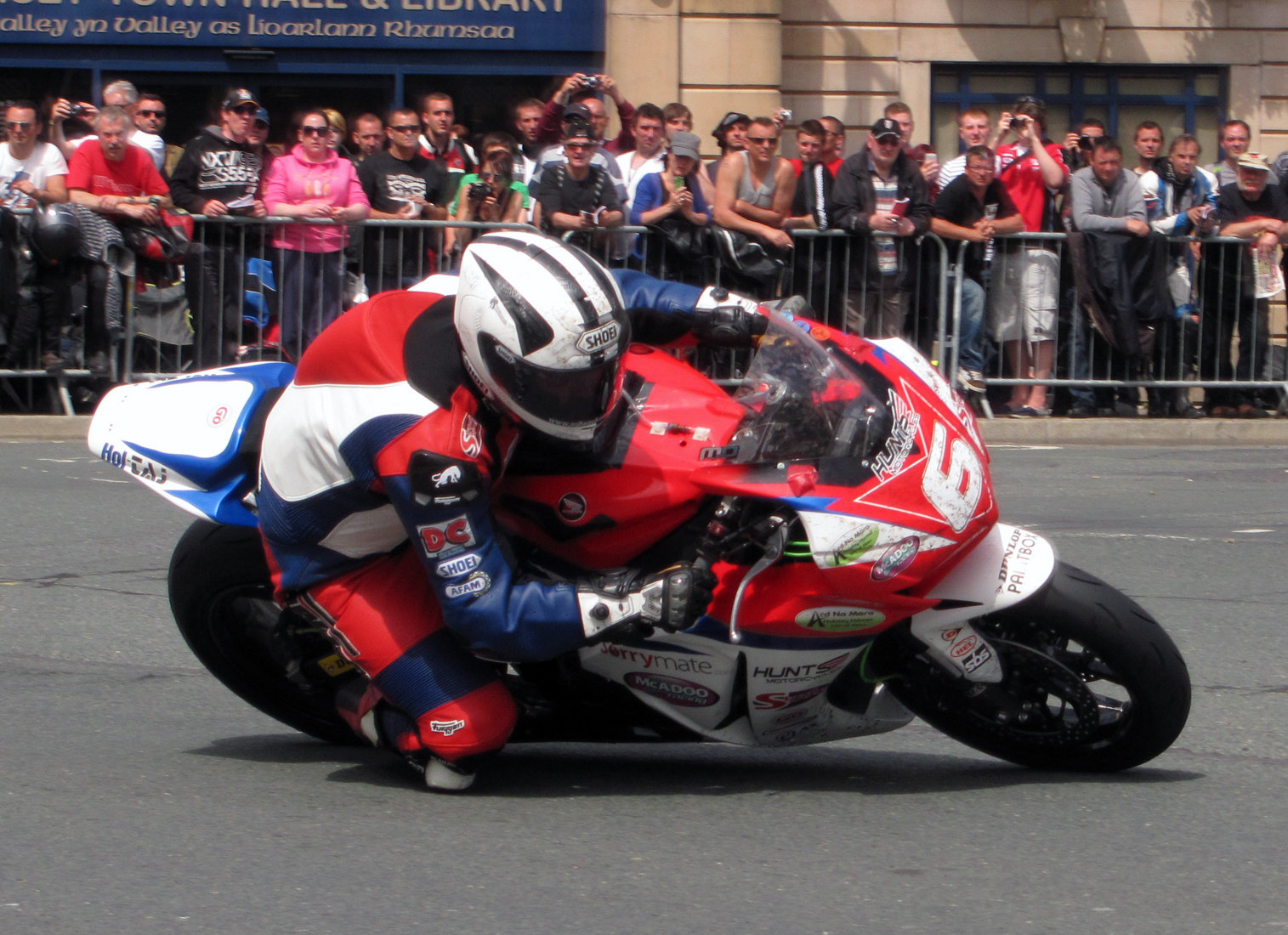
Superstock TT – Michael Dunlop (6) Honda Parliament Square, Ramsey 3 June 2013.

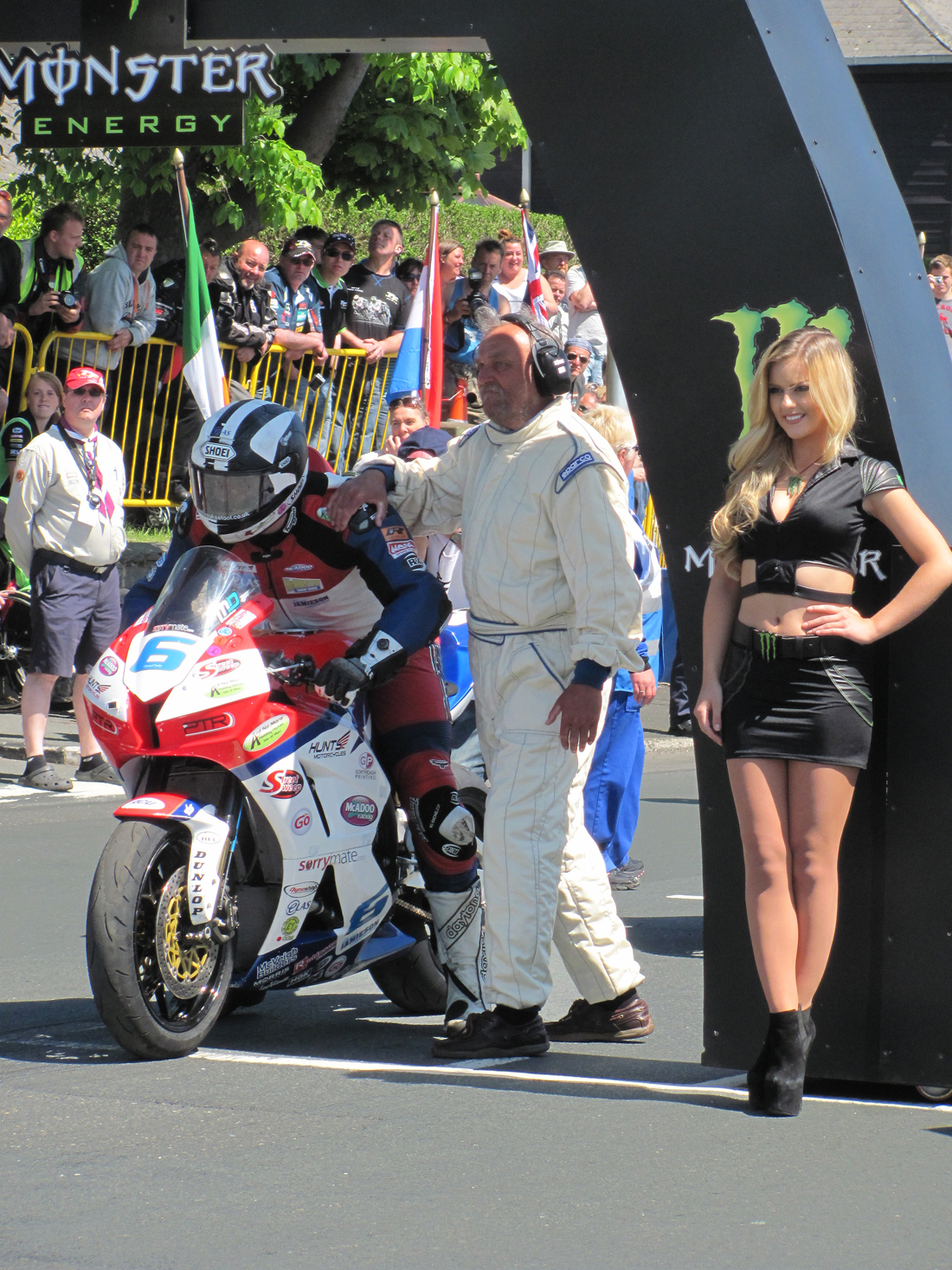
2013 Isle of Man TT Supersport TT Race 2 Michael Dunlop (6), 600cc Honda TT Grandstand 5 June 2013.

== Bibliography ==
- "Island Racer 2013: The Complete TT Companion". Island Racer. Mortons Media Group. 2013 – via Kelsey Publishing.
