= 2012 Ulster Grand Prix =

Motorcycle race in Northern Ireland

(United Kingdom) 2012 Ulster Grand Prix
Race details
Date	6–11 August 2012
Location	Dundrod Circuit, County Antrim, Northern Ireland
Course	Road Course; 7.401 mi (11.911 km)

The 2012 Ulster Grand Prix races were held on the Dundrod Circuit between 6–11 August 2012 in County Antrim, Northern Ireland. The event celebrated the 90th anniversary of the Ulster Grand Prix with a Bike Week Festival with practice commencing on Wednesday 8 August 2012 followed by the Dundrod 150 Races on Thursday 9 August and culminating with the Ulster Grand Prix on Saturday 11 August 2012.

== See also ==
- North West 200
- Isle of Man TT
- Manx Grand Prix
