= Lightweight TT =

Motorcycle race on the Isle of Man

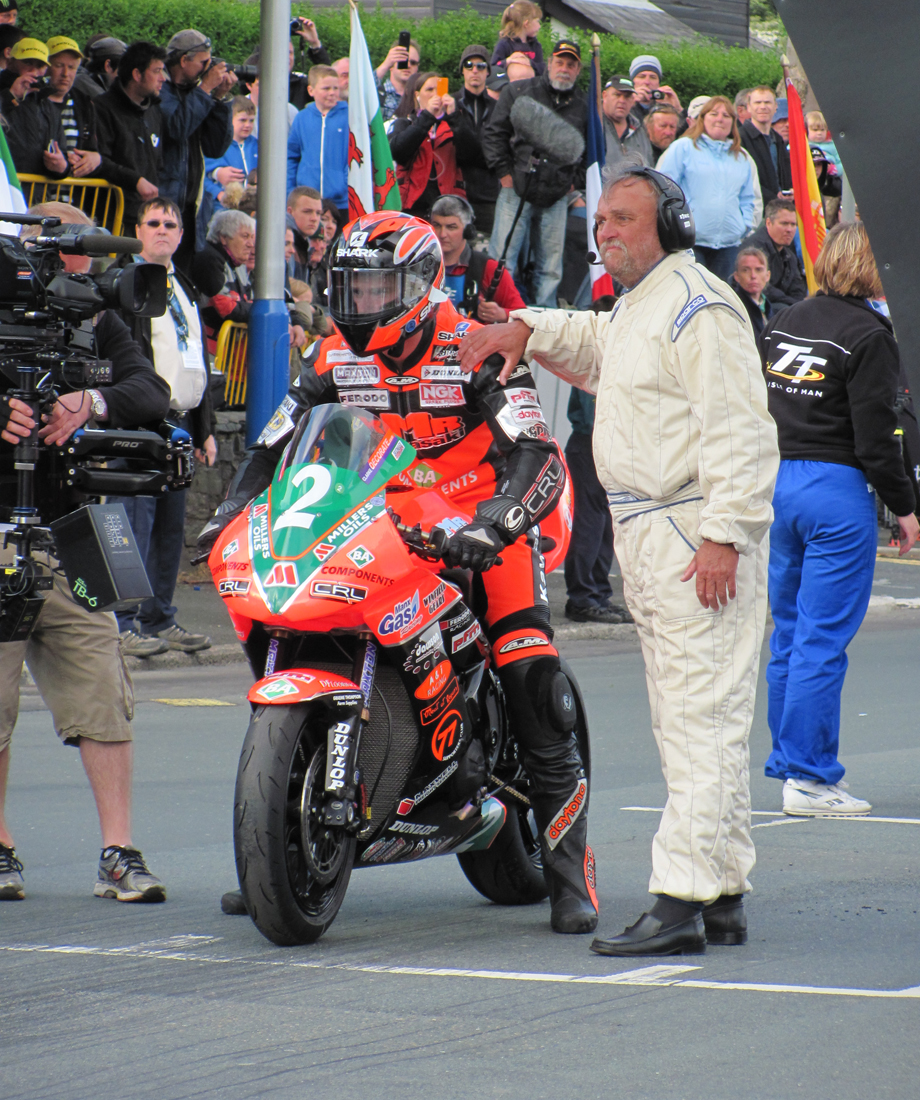
After a weather delay of 24 hours, Ryan Farquhar (2), the winner of the Lightweight TT on his KMR Kawasaki ER-6 650 cc ready at the TT Grandstand startline, 9 June 2012

The Supertwin TT is a motorcycle road race that is a part of the Isle of Man TT festival - an annual motorcycle event traditionally held over the last week of May and first week of June. Prior to the 2022 edition of the TT, the race was known as the Lightweight TT.

== History ==
The Lightweight class, as it was then known, was first present at the 1920 TT races, as a category in the Junior TT. However it was not until 1922 that the first time the Lightweight TT took place, won by motorcycle journalist Geoff S. Davison riding a Levis, at an average speed of 49.89 mph (80.29 km/h) for 5 laps of the Snaefell Mountain Course. Between 1949 and 1976, the Lightweight race was part of the Grand Prix motorcycle racing season.

In the changes following the loss of FIM World Championship status after the 1976 event, the Lightweight TT event was dropped with the 250 cc machines running for the Junior TT in place of the now defunct 350 cc formula. The Lightweight TT returned in 1995 before being split into two distinct events from 1999, dropping from the schedule again after 2004.

The Lightweight TT and the Ultra-Lightweight TT were later reinstated to the 2008 & 2009 race schedules, but were held on the 4.25 mile Billown Circuit in the south of the Isle of Man. For the 2010 races, the Lightweight TT was again dropped from the race schedule on cost grounds.

The event was re-introduced for the 2012 races on the Mountain course, with a change to water-cooled four-stroke twin cylinder engines not exceeding 650 cc and complying with the ACU Standing Regulations.

The event was renamed Supertwin TT in 2022.

== The Lightweight category ==
There have been several different categories of motorcycle that can compete in this event. In the 1950s and 1960s, the principal TT solo events were the Senior (500 cc), Junior (350 cc), and Lightweight (250 cc, or sometimes 125 cc). The 125 cc class was occasionally called the "Ultra-Lightweight" class.

Currently the Lightweight class comprises road-based "SuperTwin" solo machines with liquid-cooled four-stroke engines of up to 500 cc for Four-Cylinder and 800 cc Twin-Cylinder engine capacity.

== Overview ==
- 1924–1948: For motorcycles not exceeding 250 cc engine capacity.
- 1949–1953: FIM World Championship event for motorcycles not exceeding 250 cc engine capacity, held on the Snaefell mountain course.
- 1954–1959: FIM World Championship event for motorcycles not exceeding 250 cc engine capacity, held on the Clypse Course.
- 1960–1976: FIM World Championship event for motorcycles not exceeding 250 cc engine capacity, held on the Mountain Course.
- 1977–1994: event not run (250 cc formula run as Junior TT).
- 1995–1998: For 2-stroke motorcycles not exceeding 250 cc engine capacity and 4-stroke motorcycles not exceeding 400 cc, held on the Mountain Course.
- 1999–2003: Lightweight 400 TT for 4-stroke motorcycles not exceeding 400 cc engine capacity, held on the Mountain Course.
- 1999–2002: Lightweight 250 TT for 2-stroke motorcycles not exceeding 250 cc engine capacity, held on the Mountain Course (the category running within Junior TT in 2003).
- 2008–2009: For motorcycles not exceeding 250 cc engine capacity, held on the Billown Circuit.
- 2012–2019: For water-cooled four-stroke twin cylinder not exceeding an engine capacity of 650 cc and complying with the ACU Standing Regulations.

== Speed and lap records ==
The lap record for the Lightweight TT is held by Michael Dunlop in a time of 18 minutes and 26.543 seconds, at an average speed of 122.750 mph (197.547 km/h) set during the 2018 race. The race record for the 4 lap (150.73 miles/242.58 km) Lightweight TT is a time of 1 hour, 15 minutes and 05.032 seconds, at an average race speed of 120.601 mph (194.088 km/h), also held by Dunlop during the 2018 race.

== List of Lightweight TT Winners ==
Year	Rider	Manufacturer	Average Race Speed
1922	(Northern Ireland) Geoff S. Davison	Levis	49.49 mph
1923	(Scotland) Jock Porter	New Gerrard	51.93 mph
1924	(England) Edwin Twemlow	New Imperial	55.44 mph
1925	(England) Edwin Twemlow	New Imperial	57.74 mph
1926	(Republic of Ireland) C. W. Johnston	Cotton	57.74 mph
1927	(England) Wal Handley	Rex-Acme	63.3 mph
1928	(England) Frank Longman	OK-Supreme	62.9 mph
1929	(England) Syd Crabtree	Excelsior	63.87 mph
1930	(Scotland) Jimmie Guthrie	AJS	64.71 mph
1931	(England) Graham Walker	Rudge	68.98 mph
1932	(United Kingdom) Leo Davenport	New Imperial	70.48 mph
1933	(England) Syd Gleave	Excelsior	71.59 mph
1934	(England) Jimmy Simpson	Rudge	70.81 mph
1935	(Republic of Ireland) Stanley Woods	Moto Guzzi	71.56 mph
1936	(England) Bob Foster	New Imperial	74.28 mph
1937	(Italy) Omobono Tenni	Moto Guzzi	74.72 mph
1938	(Nazi Germany) Ewald Kluge	DKW	78.48 mph
1939	(England) Ted Mellors	Benelli	74.26 mph
1940-1946	Not held		
1947	(Republic of Ireland) Manliffe Barrington	Moto Guzzi	73.22 mph
1948	(United Kingdom) Maurice Cann	Moto Guzzi	75.12 mph
1949	(Republic of Ireland) Manliffe Barrington	Moto Guzzi	77.99 mph
1950	(Italy) Dario Ambrosini	Benelli	78.08 mph
1951	(England) Tommy Wood	Moto Guzzi	81.39 mph
1952	(Scotland) Fergus Anderson	Moto Guzzi	83.82 mph
1953	(Scotland) Fergus Anderson	Moto Guzzi	84.73 mph
1954	(Germany) Werner Haas	NSU	90.88 mph
1955	(England) Bill Lomas	MV Agusta	71.37 mph
1956	(Italy) Carlo Ubbiali	MV Agusta	67.05 mph
1957	(England) Cecil Sandford	Mondial	75.80 mph
1958	(Italy) Tarquinio Provini	MV Agusta	76.89 mph
1959	(Italy) Tarquinio Provini	MV Agusta	77.77 mph
1960	(Federation of Rhodesia and Nyasaland) Gary Hocking	MV Agusta	93.64 mph
1961	(England) Mike Hailwood	Honda	98.38 mph
1962	(England) Derek Minter	Honda	96.68 mph
1963	(Rhodesia) Jim Redman	Honda	94.85 mph
1964	(Rhodesia) Jim Redman	Honda	97.45 mph
1965	(Rhodesia) Jim Redman	Honda	97.19 mph
1966	(England) Mike Hailwood	Honda	101.79 mph
1967	(England) Mike Hailwood	Honda	103.07 mph
1968	(England) Bill Ivy	Yamaha	99.58 mph
1969	(Australia) Kel Carruthers	Benelli	95.95 mph
1970	(Australia) Kel Carruthers	Yamaha	96.13 mph
1971	(England) Phil Read	Yamaha	98.02 mph
1972	(England) Phil Read	Yamaha	99.68 mph
1973	(England) Charlie Williams	Yamaha	100.05 mph
1974	(England) Charlie Williams	Yamaha	94.16 mph
1975	(England) Chas Mortimer	Yamaha	101.78 mph
1976	(England) Tom Herron	Yamaha	103.55 mph
1977-1994	Not held		
1995	(Northern Ireland) Joey Dunlop	Honda	115.68 mph
1996	(Northern Ireland) Joey Dunlop	Honda	115.31 mph
1997	(Northern Ireland) Joey Dunlop	Honda	115.59 mph
1998	(Northern Ireland) Joey Dunlop	Honda	96.61 mph
1999	(England) John McGuinness	Honda	116.79 mph
1999	(New Zealand) Paul Williams	Honda	109.01 mph
2000	(Northern Ireland) Joey Dunlop	Honda	116.01 mph
2000	(New Zealand) Brett Richmond	Honda	104.00 mph
2001	Not held		
2002	(New Zealand) Bruce Anstey	Yamaha	115.32 mph
2002	(Isle of Man) Richard Quayle	Honda	109.27 mph
2003	(England) John McGuinness	Honda	109.52 mph
2004	(England) John McGuinness	Honda	110.28 mph
2005-2007	Not Held		
2008	(Wales) Ian Lougher	Honda	100.741 mph
2009	(Wales) Ian Lougher	Honda	101.168 mph
2009	(Wales) Ian Lougher	Honda	100.273 mph
2010-2011	Not Held		
2012	(Northern Ireland) Ryan Farquhar	Kawasaki	114.155 mph
2013	(England) James Hillier	Kawasaki	117.694 mph
2014	(England) Dean Harrison	Kawasaki	117.460 mph
2015	(England) Ivan Lintin	Kawasaki	118.936 mph
2016	(England) Ivan Lintin	Kawasaki	118.454 mph
2017	(England) Michael Rutter	Paton	118.645 mph
2018	(Northern Ireland) Michael Dunlop	Paton	120.601 mph
2019	(Northern Ireland) Michael Dunlop	Paton	121.646 mph
2022	(England) Peter Hickman	Paton	120.006 mph
2023 (Race 1)	(Northern Ireland) Michael Dunlop	Paton	120.505 mph
2023 (Race 2)	(England) Peter Hickman	Yamaha	119.318 mph

=== Race winners (riders) ===
Rider	Wins
Joey Dunlop	6
Charlie Williams	5
Mike Hailwood, Jim Redman	3
Fergus Anderson, Manliff Barrington, Kel Carruthers, Michael Dunlop, Ivan Lintin, Ian Lougher, Phil Read, Tarquinio Provini, Eric Twemlow	2
Dario Ambrosini, Bruce Anstey, Maurice Cann, Syd Crabtree, Ryan Farquhar, Gary Hocking, Jimmie Guthrie, Wal Handley, Werner Haas, Dean Harrison, Tom Herron, James Hillier, Bill Ivy, Ewald Kluge, John McGuinness, Ted Mellors, Derek Minter, Jack A. Porter, Richard Quayle, Jimmie Simpson, Omobono Tenni, Carlo Ubbiali, Graham Walker, Stanley Woods	1

== See also ==
- TT Zero
- Ultra-Lightweight TT
- Sidecar TT
- Junior TT
- Senior TT
