= Ivan Lintin =

Former motorcycle racer

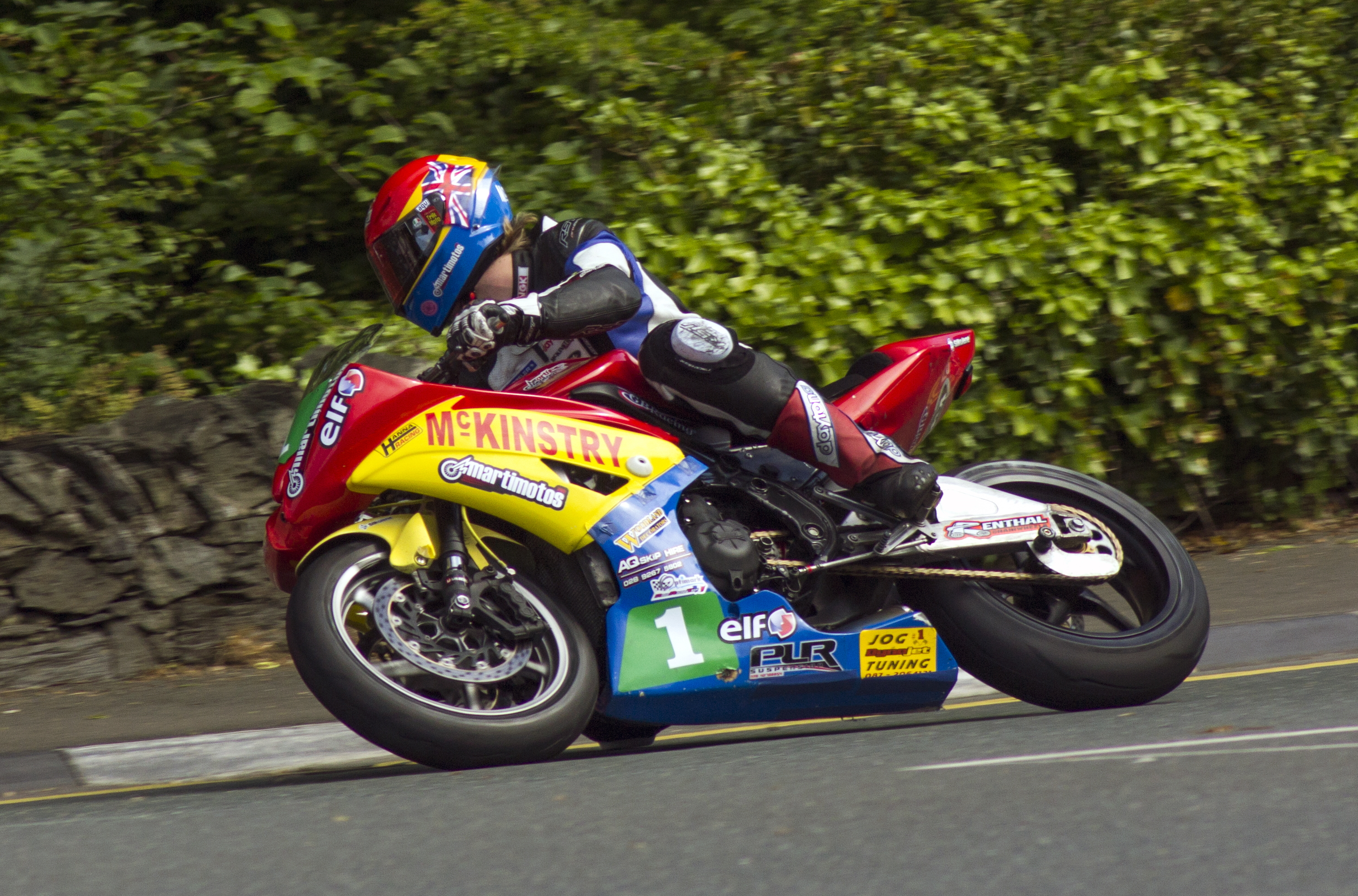
- Lintin at the 2014 Isle of Man TT
- Nationality: English
- Born: 17 August 1984 (age 42); Lincoln, Lincolnshire
Motorcycle racing career statistics
Isle of Man TT career
TTs contested	8 (2011 - 2018)
TT wins	2
First TT win	2015 Lightweight TT
Last TT win	2016 Lightweight TT
TT podiums	2

Ivan George Lintin (born 17 August 1984) is a former motorcycle racer from Bardney, Lincolnshire who regularly competed in the Isle of Man TT races.

Lintin made his debut in traditional road racing in 2008. He competed at the Snaefell Mountain Course for the first time that year, taking second place in the Senior Newcomers race of the Manx Grand Prix.

Lintin made his Isle of Man TT debut in 2011, taking a best of 17th in a Supersport race. He returned to the event in 2012 and added the Lightweight TT to his schedule, ran according to Supertwin rules the first time, taking seventh place in the race. He then became known for being a specialist of the Supertwin bikes. In that class, he won two Isle of Man TT races in 2015 and 2016, two North West 200 races in 2016, and three Ulster Grand Prix races in 2013, 2014 and 2018.

In 2018, Lintin was leading the Lightweight TT race with a growing lead on his way to a third TT victory, when later in the race an engine failure brought retirement. Michael Dunlop went on to claim his first win in that race category.

Lintin suffered severe injuries during the 2018 Southern 100 road races in the Isle of Man, in a multiple bike incident involving another three riders, one of whom, James Cowton, died. Lintin required emergency treatment on the island subsequently followed by surgery and lengthy intensive care at Liverpool. He spent two weeks in a coma and nine weeks in hospital in total.

Lintin was a semi-professional racer and retained firefighter. Two years after the injury, he was informed that he could return to the job, although his bike racing career was over.
