= 2012 Isle of Man TT =

Annual motorcycle racing event

2012 Isle of Man TT Races
- Isle of Man TT Mountain Course layout

Race details
- Date: 26 May – 8 June 2012
- Location: Douglas, Isle of Man
- Course: Isle of Man TT Mountain Course; 37.733 mi (60.725 km)

Superbike TT
Pole Position	Fastest Lap
(England) John McGuinness	(England) John McGuinness
130.079 mph	130.483 mph
Podium
1. (England) John McGuinness
2. (Australia) Cameron Donald	3. (New Zealand) Bruce Anstey

Sidecar TT Race 1
Pole Position	Fastest Lap
(Isle of Man) Dave Molyneux / (England) Patrick Farrance	(Isle of Man) Dave Molyneux / (England) Patrick Farrance
113.538 mph	113.590 mph
Podium
1. (Isle of Man) Dave Molyneux / (England) Patrick Farrance
2. (England) Ben Birchall/ (England) Tom Birchall	3. (England) Conrad Harrison/ (England) Mike Aylott

Supersport TT Race 1
Pole Position	Fastest Lap
(Northern Ireland) Michael Dunlop	(Northern Ireland) Michael Dunlop
126.184 mph	126.948 mph
Podium
1. (New Zealand) Bruce Anstey
2. (Australia) Cameron Donald	3. (Northern Ireland) William Dunlop

Superstock TT
Pole Position	Fastest Lap
(England) Michael Rutter	(Northern Ireland) Michael Dunlop
128.072 mph	129.253 mph
Podium
1. (England) John McGuinness
2. (Northern Ireland) Michael Dunlop	3. (Northern Ireland) Ryan Farquhar

TT Zero
Pole Position	Fastest Lap
(England) Michael Rutter	Michael Rutter
102.50 mph	104.056 mph
Podium
1. (England) Michael Rutter
2. (England) John McGuinness	3. (United States) Mark Miller

Sidecar TT Race 2
Pole Position	Fastest Lap
(Isle of Man) Dave Molyneux / (England) Patrick Farrance	(Isle of Man) Dave Molyneux / (England) Patrick Farrance
113.538 mph	114.486 mph
Podium
1. (Isle of Man) Dave Molyneux / (England) Patrick Farrance
2. (England) Tim Reeves/ (Isle of Man) Dan Sayle	3. (England) Ben Birchall/ (England) Tom Birchall

Supersport TT Race 2
Pole Position	Fastest Lap
(Northern Ireland) Michael Dunlop	(Northern Ireland) Michael Dunlop
126.184 mph	125.629 mph
Podium
1. (Northern Ireland) Michael Dunlop
2. (Australia) Cameron Donald	3. (Northern Ireland) Ryan Farquhar

Lightweight TT
Pole Position	Fastest Lap
(Northern Ireland) Ryan Farquhar	(England) Michael Rutter
115.398 mph	115.554 mph
Podium
1. (Northern Ireland) Ryan Farquhar
2. (England) James Hillier	3. (England) Michael Rutter

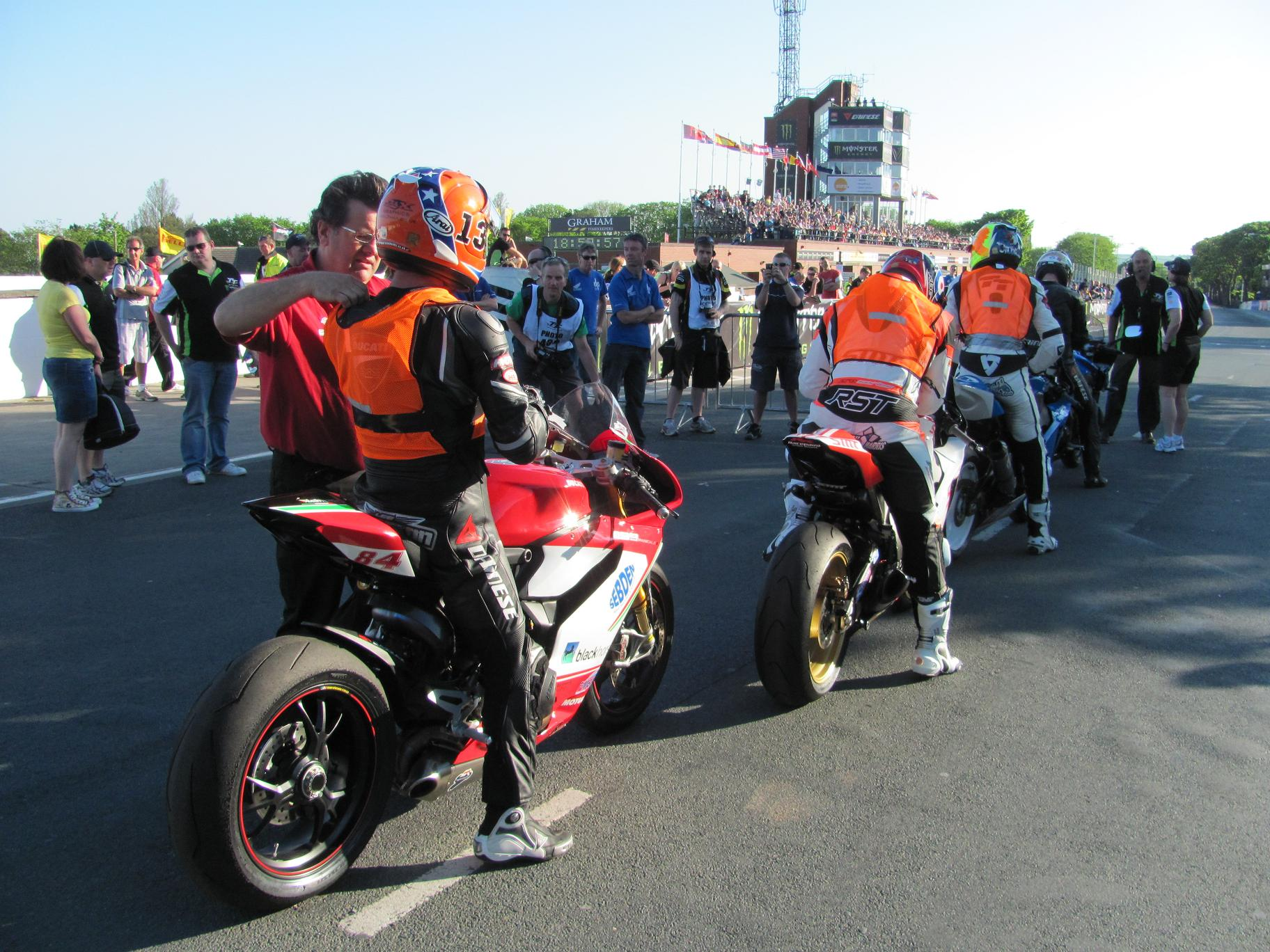
Newcomers line-up at the start-line for the Competitors Speed Control-Lap

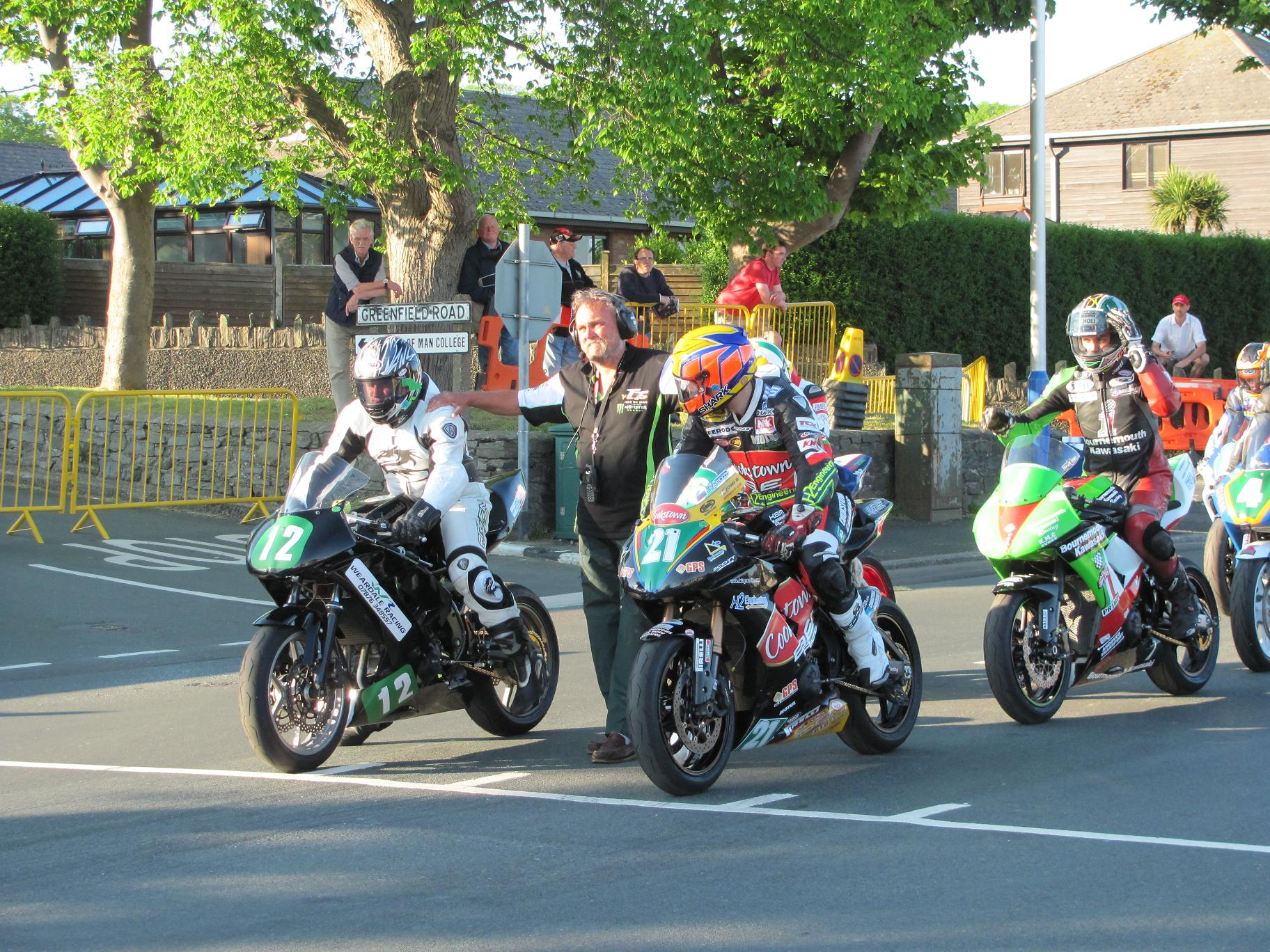
Lightweight TT at the start of the first timed practice session including Ian Pattinson (9), John Burrows (21) & James Hillier (1)

2012 Isle of Man TT were held between Saturday 26 May and Saturday 9 June 2012 on the 37.73-mile Isle of Man TT Mountain Course. The 2012 Isle of Man TT Festival also included the Pre-TT Classic Races on 25, 26 & 28 May 2012 and the Post-TT Races on 9 June 2012 and both events held on the Billown Circuit.

After winning the first event of the 2012 Isle of Man TT the Superbike TT race, the works Honda rider John McGuinness later in the week won for the first time the 1000cc Superstock TT race to raise his tally to nineteen Isle of Man TT wins and the Joey Dunlop TT Championship by 74 points from Bruce Anstey and Cameron Donald in third place. After a year's sabbatical, the Isle of Man sidecar TT competitor Dave Molyneux returned to racing at the Isle of Man TT to win both Sidecar TT Races 1 & 2 in convincing style. The New Zealander, Bruce Anstey repeated his 2011 success and again won the 600cc Supersport TT Race 1. After retiring from the lead of Supersport TT Race 1 on lap 3, the second Supersport TT Race was won by Michael Dunlop after the race was delayed by problems with weather on the Snaefell Mountain Course. The third running of the TT Zero was again won by Michael Rutter riding the electric powered MotoCzysz motor-cycle and also breaking the prestigious 100 mph barrier with a lap at an average race speed of 104.056 mph. The Blue Riband event of the 2012 TT Race week the Senior TT was held over to the next day due to heavy rain and low cloud on the TT Mountain Course. The rescheduled Senior TT race was later cancelled for the first time in the history of the event due to further problems with low cloud and rain showers on the section of the TT Course from the Mountain Mile to the 32nd Milestone. The last race of the 2012 Isle of Man TT Races, the Lightweight TT making a return to the race programme for 650cc Supertwin motor-cycles and after being reduced in length produced an inaugural win for Ryan Farquhar in the new class.

== Results ==
=== Practice Times ===
==== Practice Times & Leaderboard Superbike/Senior TT ====
Plates; Black on White/Black on Yellow.

Rank	Rider	Sat 26 May	Mon 28 May	Tues 29 May	Wed 30 May	Thurs 31 May	Fri 1 June
1	(England) John McGuinness; 999cc Honda	—— No Time	17' 38.95; 128.267 mph	17' 29.59; 129.411 mph	17' 24.20; 130.079 mph	17' 58.14; 125.984 mph	Cancelled; No Time
2	(New Zealand) Bruce Anstey; 1000cc Honda	—— No Time	18' 03.97; 125.306 mph	—— No Time	17' 28.33; 129.566 mph	17' 34.44; 128.815 mph	Cancelled; No Time
3	(Australia) Cameron Donald; 1000cc Honda	—— No Time	17' 54.77; 126.379 mph	17' 32.74; 129.023 mph	17' 32.32; 129.075 mph	17' 59.56; 125.818 mph	Cancelled; No Time
4	(England) Guy Martin; 1000cc Suzuki	—— No Time	18' 14.27; 124.127 mph	17' 44.97; 127.542 mph	17' 34.20; 128.866 mph	17' 50.03; 126.939 mph	Cancelled; No Time
5	(England) Michael Rutter; 1000cc Kawasaki	—— No Time	18' 23.11; 123.132 mph	17' 50.95; 126.830 mph	17' 48.72; 127.094 mph	17' 40.56; 128.072 mph	Cancelled; No Time
6	(England) James Hillier; 1000cc Kawasaki	—— No Time	—— No Time	—— No Time	17' 42.73; 127.811 mph	18' 00.88; 125.664 mph	Cancelled; No Time
7	(Northern Ireland) Michael Dunlop; 1000cc Honda	—— No Time	18' 16.53; 123.871 mph	17' 52.88; 126.602 mph	17' 44.94; 127.546 mph	17' 53.08; 126.577 mph	Cancelled; No Time
8	(England) Dan Stewart; 1000cc Honda	—— No Time	—— No Time	—— No Time	17' 45.71; 127.453 mph	—— No Time	Cancelled; No Time
9	(England) Simon Andrews; 1000cc Honda	—— No Time	18' 08.61; 124.772 mph	18' 18.96; 123.597 mph	17' 46.36; 127.376 mph	18' 18.26; 123.676 mph	Cancelled; No Time
10	(England) Gary Johnson; 1000cc Honda	—— No Time	18' 13.85; 124.174 mph	17' 59.36; 125.841 mph	17' 47.10; 127.287 mph	17' 54.10; 126.458 mph	Cancelled; No Time

==== Practice Times & Leaderboard Superstock TT ====
Plates; Red.

Rank	Rider	Sat 26 May	Mon 28 May	Tues 29 May	Wed 30 May
1	(England) James Hillier; 1000cc Kawasaki	—— No Time	18' 11.80; 124.407 mph	—— No Time	17' 42.73; 127.811 mph
2	(England) Simon Andrews; 1000cc Honda	—— No Time	18' 08.61; 124.772 mph	18' 18.96; 123.597 mph	17' 46.36; 127.376 mph
3	(Northern Ireland) William Dunlop; 1000cc Honda	—— No Time	18' 35.87; 121.723 mph	18' 04.99; 125.189 mph	17' 50.25; 126.913 mph
4	(New Zealand) Bruce Anstey; 1000cc Honda	—— No Time	18' 27.71; 122.621 mph	17' 57.36; 126.075 mph	17' 50.73; 126.856 mph
5	(England) John McGuinness; 999cc Honda	—— No Time	—— No Time	—— No Time	17' 56.64; 126.159 mph
6	(England) Gary Johnson; 1000cc Honda	—— No Time	—— No Time	18' 25.13; 122.907 mph	17' 56.85; 126.135 mph
7	(Northern Ireland) Ryan Farquhar; 1000cc Kawasaki	—— No Time	—— No Time	—— No Time	18' 02.27; 125.503 mph
8	(England) Steve Mercer; 1000cc Honda	—— No Time	18' 46.65; 120.560 mph	18' 27.93; 122.596 mph	18' 03.34; 125.379 mph
9	(England) Guy Martin; 1000cc Suzuki	—— No Time	18' 34.12; 121.915 mph	—— No Time	18' 03.45; 125.366 mph
10	(Isle of Man) Dan Kneen; 999cc Suzuki	—— No Time	18' 26.38; 122.768 mph	18' 08.10; 124.830 mph	18' 28.32; 122.554 mph

==== Practice Times & Leaderboard Supersport Junior TT ====
Plates; Blue.

Rank	Rider	Sat 26 May	Mon 28 May	Tues 29 May	Wed 30 May
1	(Northern Ireland) William Dunlop; 600cc Honda	—— No Time	18' 25.15; 122.904 mph	18' 08.63; 124.770 mph	17' 56.43; 126.184 mph
2	(Northern Ireland) Michael Dunlop; 600cc Yamaha	—— No Time	18' 40.13; 121.261 mph	18' 09.63; 124.656 mph	18' 10.80; 124.521 mph
3	(New Zealand) Bruce Anstey; 600cc Honda	—— No Time	—— No Time	18' 19.93; 123.488 mph	—— No Time
4	(England) John McGuinness; 600cc Honda	—— No Time	—— No Time	18' 29.86; 122.383 mph	—— No Time
5	(Isle of Man) Dan Kneen; 600cc Suzuki	—— No Time	18' 57.17; 119.444 mph	18' 51.85; 120.006 mph	18' 30.08; 122.359 mph
6	(England) Gary Johnson; 600cc Honda	—— No Time	—— No Time	—— No Time	18' 38.10; 121.481 mph
7	(Australia) Cameron Donald; 600cc Honda	—— No Time	18' 38.46; 121.442 mph	18' 40.66; 121.203 mph	—— No Time
8	(Northern Ireland) Ryan Farquhar; 600cc Kawasaki	—— No Time	—— No Time	—— No Time	18' 40.26; 121.246 mph
9	(Wales) Ian Lougher; 600cc Kawasaki	—— No Time	18' 54.25; 113.735 mph	—— No Time	18' 44.49; 120.790 mph
10	(England) Dan Stewart; 600cc Honda	—— No Time	19' 23.28; 116.763 mph	18' 51.55; 120.037 mph	18' 53.84; 119.795 mph

==== Practice Times & Leaderboard Lightweight TT ====
Race Plates; Green.

Rank	Rider	Sat 26 May	Mon 28 May	Tues 29 May	Wed 30 May	Thurs 31 May	Fri 1 June
1	(Northern Ireland) Ryan Farquhar; 650cc Kawasaki	19' 55.80; 113.587 mph	—— No Time	19' 37.04; 115.398 mph	—— No Time	—— No Time	19' 49.66; 114.174 mph
2	(England) James Hillier; 650cc Kawasaki	20' 25.15; 110.866 mph	—— No Time	20' 00.01; 113.190 mph	—— No Time	20' 02.53; 112.952 mph	19' 42.43; 114.872 mph
3	(England) Michael Rutter; 650cc Kawasaki	—— No Time	—— No Time	20' 00.44; 113.149 mph	—— No Time	20' 11.44; 112.121 mph	20' 04.19; 112.7962 mph
4	(Wales) Ian Lougher; 650cc Kawasaki	—— No Time	—— No Time	20' 00.44; 113.149 mph	—— No Time	20' 01.77; 113.023 mph	—— No Time
5	(Northern Ireland) Adrian Archibald; 650cc Kawasaki	20' 02.82; 112.925 mph	—— No Time	—— No Time	—— No Time	20' 14.42; 111.846 mph	20' 21.91; 111.161 mph
6	(Australia) Cameron Donald; 650cc Kawasaki	20' 12.37; 112.035 mph	—— No Time	20' 03.51; 112.860 mph	—— No Time	—— No Time	—— No Time
7	(England) Ivan Lintin; 650cc Kawasaki	20' 25.15; 110.866 mph	—— No Time	20' 14.58; 111.831 mph	—— No Time	20' 16.25; 111.678 mph	20' 18.59; 111.463 mph
8	(England) Ben Wylie; 650cc Kawasaki	20' 25.15; 110.866 mph	—— No Time	20' 15.11; 111.783 mph	—— No Time	—— No Time	20' 31.47; 110.298 mph
9	(England) Russ Mountford; 650cc Kawasaki	21' 02.87; 107.555 mph	—— No Time	20' 16.10; 111.691 mph	—— No Time	—— No Time	20' 21.84; 111.166 mph
10	(Isle of Man) Dave Moffitt; 650cc Kawasaki	—— No Time	—— No Time	20' 31.79; 110.269 mph	—— No Time	20' 45.46; 109.059 mph	20' 17.45; 111.568 mph

==== Practice Times and Leaderboard 600cc Sidecar TT ====
Rank	Rider	Sat 26 May	Mon 28 May	Tues 29 May	Weds 30 May	Thurs 31 May	Fri 1 June
1	(Isle of Man) Dave Molyneux/ (England) Patrick Farrance; DMR Kawasaki 600cc	20' 25.54; 110.831 mph	20' 14.31; 111.856 mph	20' 35.28; 109.958 mph	Cancelled; No Time	19' 56.32; 113.538 mph	20' 37.06; 109.799 mph
2	(England) Tim Reeves/ (Isle of Man) Dan Sayle; LCR Honda 600cc	21' 06.36; 107.259 mph	20' 26.46; 110.748 mph	20' 04.07; 112.808 mph	Cancelled; No Time	20' 10.40; 112.218 mph	—— No Time
3	(England) Gary Bryan/ (England) Gary Partridge; Baker Honda 600cc	21' 04.24; 107.439 mph	29' 18.96; 77.221 mph	20' 58.54; 107.925 mph	Cancelled; No Time	20' 26.10; 110.781 mph	20' 31.10; 110.331 mph
4	(England) Conrad Harrison/ (England) Mike Aylott; Shelbourne Honda 600cc	20' 53.45; 108.364 mph	20' 34.31; 110.044 mph	20' 40.21; 109.520 mph	Cancelled; No Time	20' 29.26; 110.496 mph	20' 39.06; 109.622 mph
5	(England) Ben Birchall/ (England) Tom Birchall; LCR Honda 600cc	20' 54.91; 108.237 mph	—— No Time	—— No Time	Cancelled; No Time	20' 34.50; 110.027 mph	20' 47.32; 108.896 mph
6	(England) Gregory Lambert/ (England) Jason Crowe; GLR Honda 600cc	29' 40.72; 76.277 mph	—— No Time	21' 09.24; 107.016 mph	Cancelled; No Time	20' 49.61; 108.696 mph	20' 53.92; 108.323 mph
7	(England) John Holden/ (England) Andrew Winkle; LCR Kawasaki 600cc	29' 40.64; 76.280 mph	—— No Time	20' 54.40; 108.281 mph	Cancelled; No Time	—— No Time	—— No Time
8	(Isle of Man) Glyn Jones/ (Isle of Man) Richard Murphy; DMR Suzuki 600cc	29' 54.03; 75.711 mph	20' 57.35; 108.028 mph	—— No Time	Cancelled; No Time	—— No Time	—— No Time
9	(England) Douglas Wright/ (England) Martin Hull; Baker Honda 600cc	—— No Time	20' 59.61; 107.833 mph	21' 17.88; 106.292 mph	—— No Time	Cancelled; No Time	21' 05.03; 107.372 mph
10	(England) Robert Handcock/ (England) Ken Edwards; Shelbourne Honda 600cc	—— No Time	—— No Time	—— No Time	Cancelled; No Time	—— No Time	21' 10.21; 106.934 mph

=== Race results ===
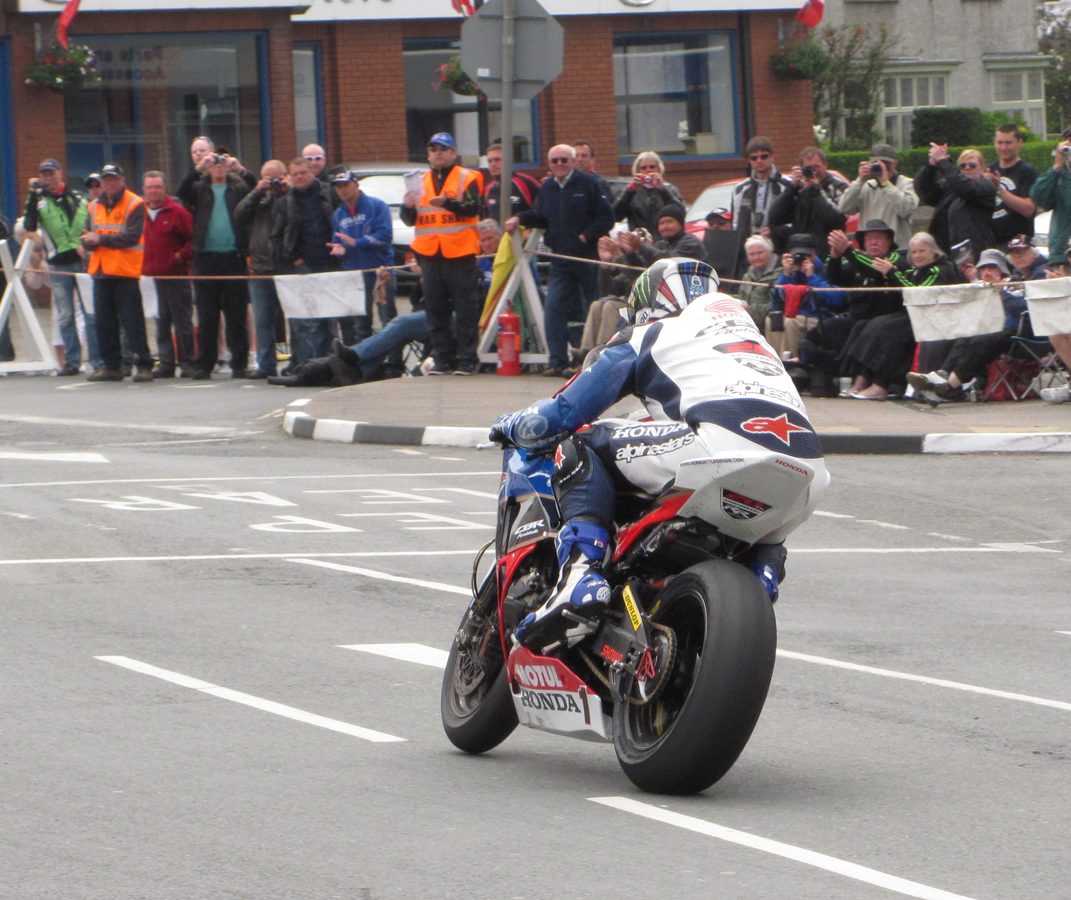
18th Isle of Man TT race win for John McGuinness and new race record

==== 2012 Superbike TT final standings. ====
2 June 2012 6 Laps (236.38 Miles) TT Mountain Course.

Rank	Rider	Team	Speed	Time
1	(England) John McGuinness	Honda 1000cc	128.078 mph	1:46.03.06
2	(Australia) Cameron Donald	Honda 1000cc	127.780 mph	1:46.17.92
3	(New Zealand) Bruce Anstey	Honda 1000cc	126.938 mph	1:47.00.22
4	(England) Guy Martin	Suzuki 1000cc	126.544 mph	1:47.20.18
5	(England) Gary Johnson	Honda 1000cc	126.241 mph	1:47.35.65
6	(Northern Ireland) William Dunlop	Honda 1000cc	125.887 mph	1:47.53.79
7	(England) James Hillier	Kawasaki 1000cc	124.589 mph	1:49.01.23
8	(England) Ian Hutchinson	Yamaha 1000cc	123.827 mph	1:49.41.52
9	(England) Dean Harrison	BMW 1000cc	123.272 mph	1:50.11.13
10	(Northern Ireland) Michael Dunlop	Honda 1000cc	123.127 mph	1:50.18.92

Fastest Lap: John McGuinness – 130.483 mph (17' 20.97) on lap 1.

==== 2012 Sidecar TT Race 1 TT final standings ====
2 June 2012 3 Laps (113.00 Miles) TT Mountain Course.

Rank	Rider	Team	Speed	Time
1	(Isle of Man) Dave Molyneux/ (England) Patrick Farrance	DMR Kawasaki 600cc	113.055 mph	1:00.04.29
2	(England) Ben Birchall/ (England) Tom Birchall	LCR Honda 600cc	112.359 mph	1:00.26.63
3	(England) Conrad Harrison/ (England) Mike Aylott	Shelbourne Honda 600cc	111.919 mph	1:00.40.89
4	(England) Gary Bryan/ (England) Jamie Winn	Baker Honda 600cc	110.346 mph	1:00.32.79
5	(England) Robert Handcock/ (England) Ken Edwards	Shelbourne Honda 600cc	107.376 mph	1:03.14.92
6	(England) Mike Cookson/ (Isle of Man) Kris Hibberd	Ireson Honda 600cc	106.923 mph	1:03.30.99
7	(England) Gary Knight/ (England) Dan Knight	DMR Kawasaki 600cc	106.612 mph	1:03.42.13
8	(France) Frank Lelias/ (England) Charlie Richardson	LCR Suzuki 600cc	106.313 mph	1:03.52.87
9	(England) John Saunders/ (England) Shaun Parker	Shelbourne Honda 600cc	105.588 mph	1:04.19.18
10	(England) Tony Thirkell/ (England) Nigel Barlow	Honda 600cc	105.354 mph	1:04.27.78

Fastest Lap: Dave Molyneux/Patrick Farrance – 113.590 mph (19' 55.77) on lap 3.

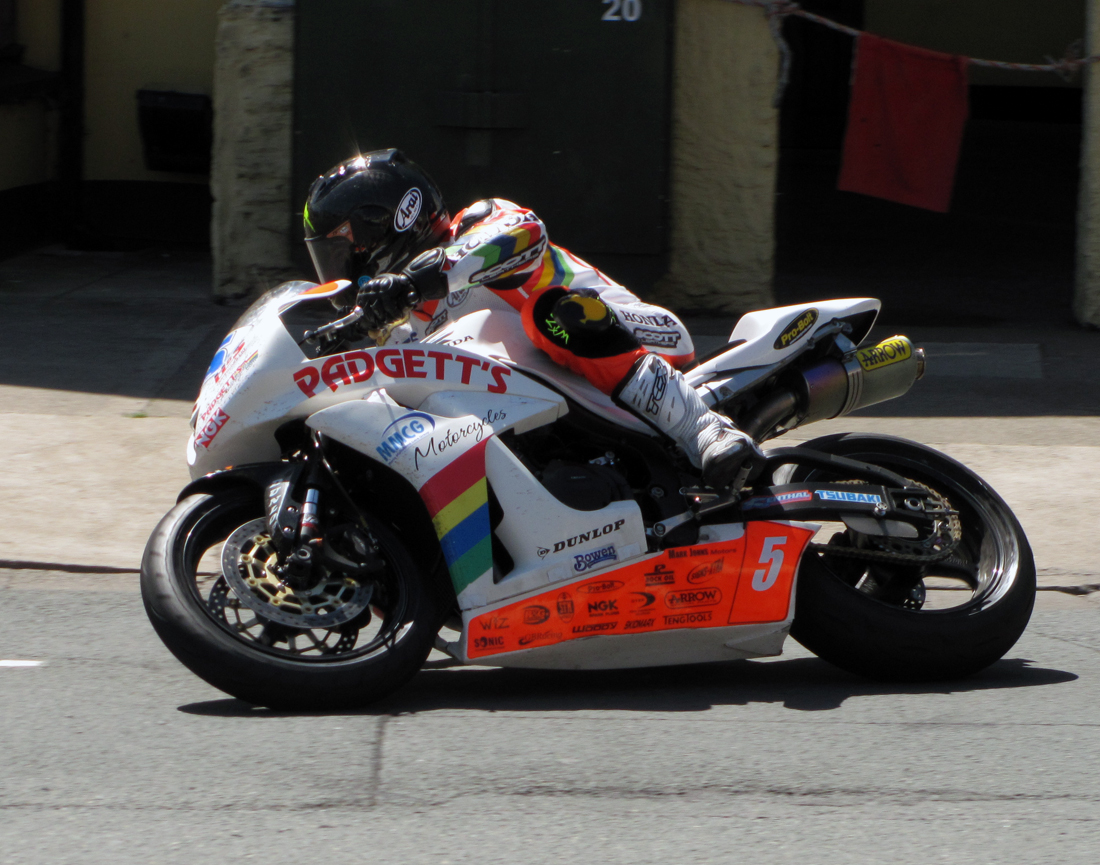
A delayed Supersport TT Race 1 is won by New Zealander Bruce Anstey

==== 2012 Supersport Junior TT Race 1 ====
4 June 2012 4 Laps (150.73 Miles) TT Mountain Course.

Rank	Rider	Team	Speed	Time
1	(New Zealand) Bruce Anstey	Honda 599cc	124.160 mph	1:12.55.92
2	(Australia) Cameron Donald	Honda 600cc	124.138 mph	1:12.56.69
3	(Northern Ireland) William Dunlop	Honda 600cc	123.542 mph	1:13.17.80
4	(England) John McGuinness	Honda 600cc	123.310 mph	1:13.26.06
5	(England) James Hillier	Kawasaki 600cc	120.046 mph	1:15.25.86
6	(Wales) Ian Lougher	Kawasaki 600cc	119.776 mph	1:15.36.06
7	(England) Roy Richardson	Yamaha 600cc	119.776 mph	1:15.36.07
8	(England) Dan Stewart	Honda 600cc	119.503 mph	1:15.46.43
9	(England) Ian Hutchinson	Yamaha 600cc	119.283 mph	1:15.54.82
10	(England) Ivan Lintin	Kawasaki 600cc	118.586 mph	1:16.21.57

Fastest Lap: Michael Dunlop – 126.948 mph (17' 49.95) on lap 2.

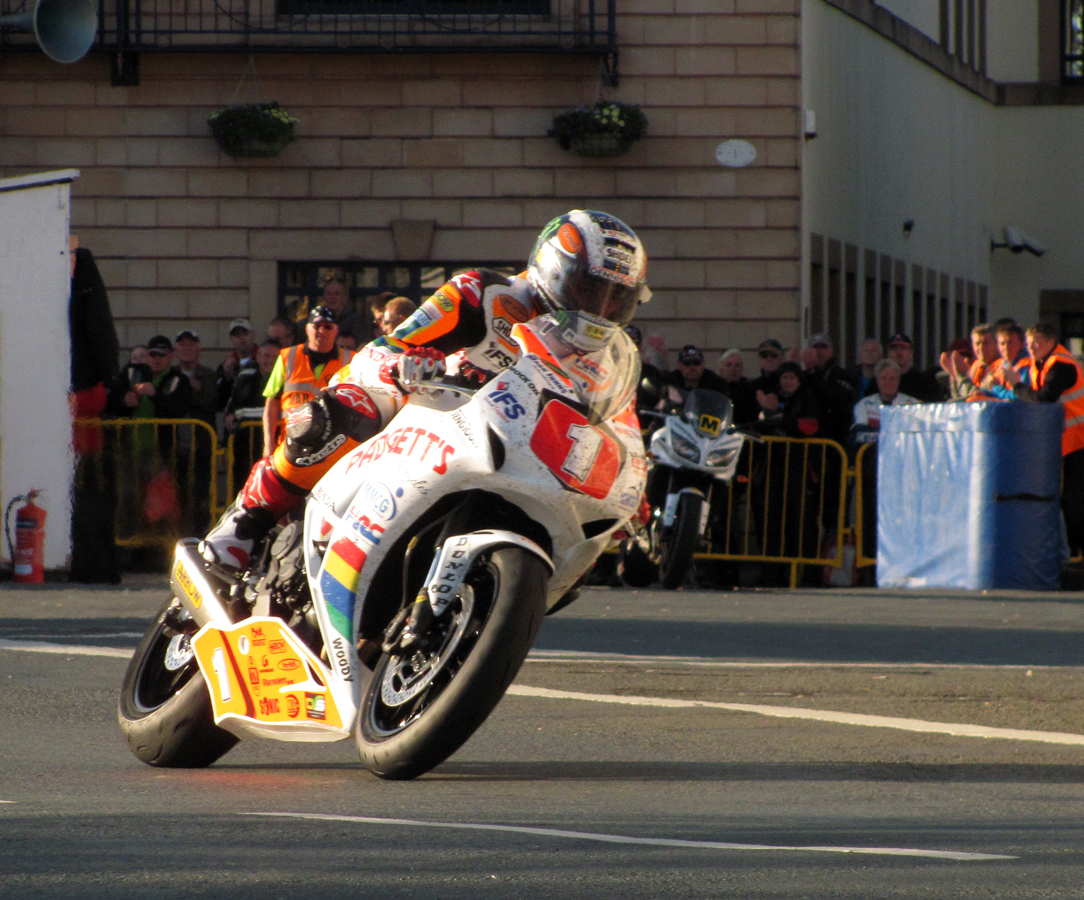
19th Isle of Man TT race win for John McGuinness Superstock TT

==== 2012 Superstock TT Race final standings. ====
4 June 2012 4 Laps (150.73 Miles) TT Mountain Course.

Rank	Rider	Team	Speed	Time
1	(England) John McGuinness	Honda 1000cc	126.657 mph	1:11.29.65
2	(Northern Ireland) Michael Dunlop	Kawasaki 1000cc	127.427 mph	1:11.37.45
3	(Northern Ireland) Ryan Farquhar	Kawasaki 1000cc	126.281 mph	1:11.42.41
4	(New Zealand) Bruce Anstey	Honda 1000cc	126.593 mph	1:12.05.98
5	(England) Guy Martin	Suzuki 1000cc	125.567 mph	1:12.06.85
6	(England) James Hillier	Kawasaki 1000cc	125.445 mph	1:12.11.09
7	(England) Michael Rutter	Kawasaki 1000cc	125.231 mph	1:12.18.48
8	(England) Gary Johnson	Honda 1000cc	124.742 mph	1:12.35.48
9	(England) Dan Stewart	Honda 1000cc	124.610 mph	1:12.40.09
10	(Australia) Cameron Donald	Honda 1000cc	124.548 mph	1:12.42.25

Fastest Lap: Michael Dunlop – 129.253 mph (17' 30.87) on lap 4.

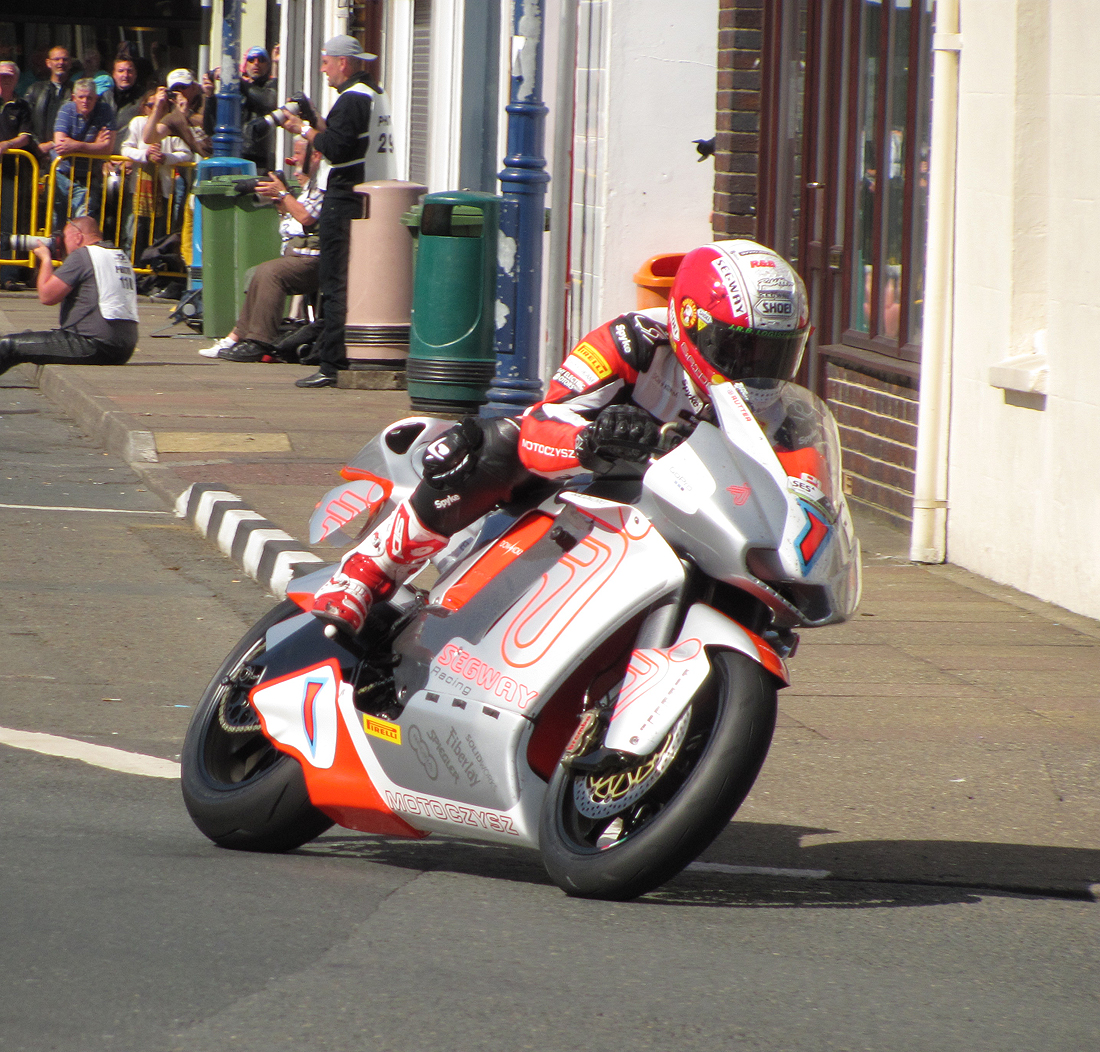
TT Zero winner Michael Rutter (pictured in practice)

==== 2012 TT Zero Race ====
6 June 2012 1 Lap (37.73 Miles) TT Mountain Course.

Rank	Rider	Team	Speed	Time
1	(England) Michael Rutter	MotoCzysz	104.056 mph	21' 45.33
2	(England) John McGuinness	Mugen Shinden	102.215 mph	22' 08.85
3	(United States) Mark Miller	MotoCzysz	101.065 mph	22' 23.97
4	(England) Rob Barber	TGM IOT	78.221 mph	28' 56.45

- (9 Starters)

Fastest Lap and New Race Record: Michael Rutter – 104.056 mph (22' 23.97) on lap 1.

==== 2012 Sidecar TT Race 2 TT final standings ====
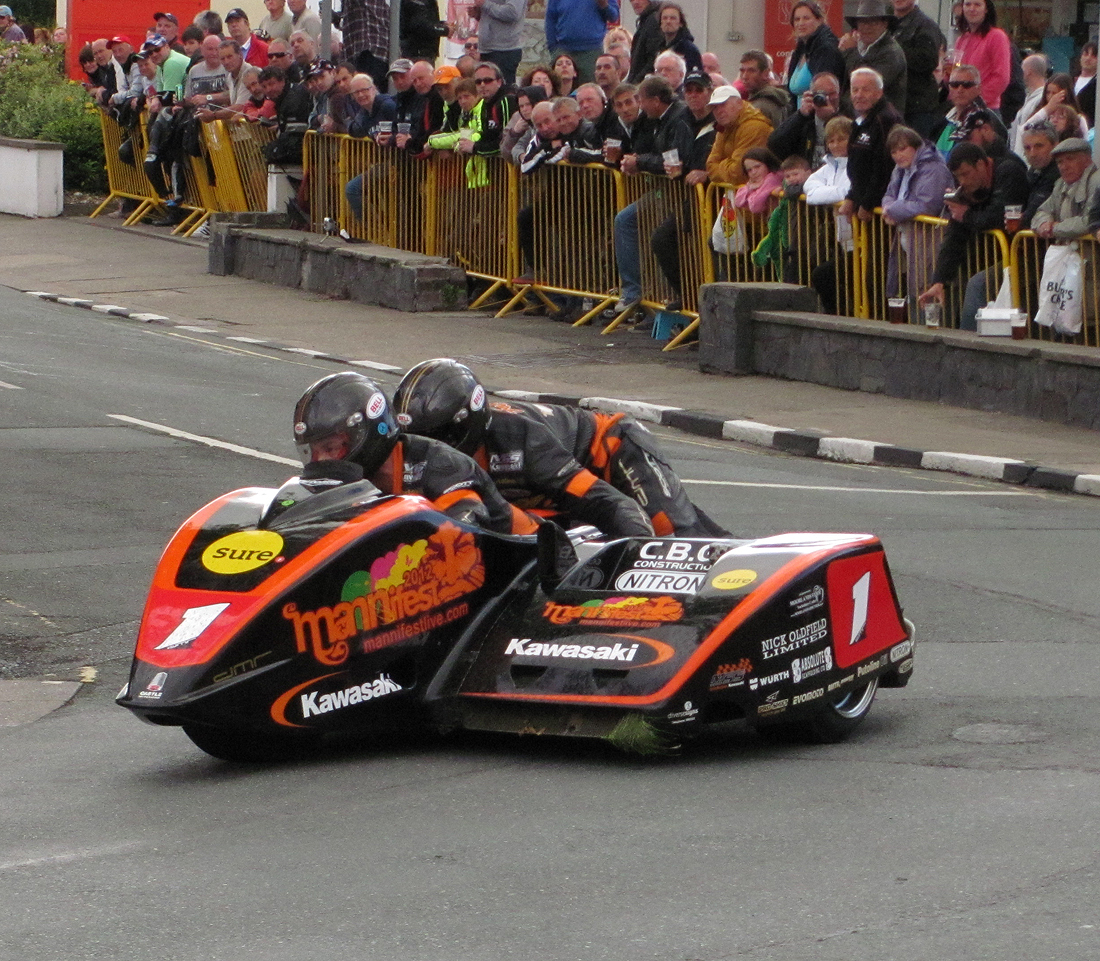
Sidecar TT Race 2 winners Dave Molyneux and Patrick Farrance

6 June 2012 3 Laps (113.00 Miles) TT Mountain Course.

Rank	Rider	Team	Speed	Time
1	(Isle of Man) Dave Molyneux/ (England) Patrick Farrance	DMR Kawasaki 600cc	113.071 mph	1:00.03.80
2	(England) Tim Reeves// (Isle of Man) Dan Sayle	LCR Honda 600cc	112.536 mph	1:00.20.92
3	(England) Ben Birchall/ (England) Tom Birchall	LCR Honda 600cc	111.672 mph	1:00.48.94
4	(England) Gary Bryan/ (England) Jamie Winn	Baker Honda 600cc	108.835 mph	1:02.24.04
5	(England) Douglas Wright/ (England) Martin Hull	Baker Honda 600cc	108.429 mph	1:02.38.06
6	(England) Greg Lambert/ (England) Jason Crowe	Honda 600cc	108.038 mph	1:02.51.68
7	(England) Robert Handcock/ (England) Ken Edwards	Shelbourne Honda 600cc	106.589 mph	1:03.42.93
8	(England) Tony Baker/ (England) Fiona Baker-Milligan	Baker Honda 600cc	106.157 mph	1:03.58.52
9	(Isle of Man) Karl Bennett/ (Isle of Man) Lee Cain	Shelbourne Honda 600cc	105.965 mph	1:04.05.46
10	(France) Frank Lelias/ (England) Charlie Richardson	Suzuki 600cc	105.450 mph	1:04.24.25

Fastest Lap: Dave Molyneux/Patrick Farrance – 114.486 mph (19' 46.42) on lap 3.

==== 2012 Supersport Junior TT Race 2 ====
6 June 2012 4 Laps (150.73 Miles) TT Mountain Course.

Rank	Rider	Team	Speed	Time
1	(Northern Ireland) Michael Dunlop	Yamaha 600cc	124.543 mph	1:13.17.76
2	(Australia) Cameron Donald	Honda 600cc	123.171 mph	1:13.31.02
3	(Northern Ireland) Ryan Farquhar	Kawasaki 600cc	122.633 mph	1:13.50.37
4	(New Zealand) Bruce Anstey	Honda 600cc	122.633 mph	1:13.50.38
5	(England) John McGuinness	Honda 600cc	122.327 mph	1:14.01.46
6	(England) Ian Hutchinson	Yamaha 600cc	120.549 mph	1:15.06.97
7	(England) James Hillier	Kawasaki 600cc	120.436 mph	1:15.11.20
8	(England) Guy Martin	Suzuki 600cc	120.256 mph	1:15.17.95
9	(England) Dan Stewart	Honda 600cc	119.521 mph	1:15.45.73
10	(England) Daniel Cooper	Triumph 675cc	119.341 mph	1:15.52.62

Fastest Lap: Michael Dunlop – 125.629 mph (18' 01.19) on lap 4.

==== 2012 Supersport Lightweight TT ====
9 June 2012 3 Laps (113.00 Miles) * Reduced Race Distance - TT Mountain Course.

Rank	Rider	Team	Speed	Time
1	(Northern Ireland) Ryan Farquhar	Kawasaki 650cc	114.155 mph	59' 29.57
2	(England) James Hillier	Kawasaki 650cc	113.235 mph	59' 58.57
3	(England) Michael Rutter	Kawasaki 650cc	113.077 mph	1:00.03.61
4	(Australia) Cameron Donald	Kawasaki 650cc	112.115 mph	1:00.34.51
5	(England) Russ Mountford	Kawasaki 650cc	111.822 mph	1:00.44.04
6	(Northern Ireland) William Dunlop	Kawasaki 650cc	111.754 mph	1:00.46.25
7	(England) Ivan Lintin	Kawasaki 650cc	111.419 mph	1:00.57.24
8	(Wales) Ian Lougher	Kawasaki 650cc	110.155 mph	1:01.39.18
9	(England) Olie Lindsell	Kawasaki 650cc	109.989 mph	1:01.44.78
10	(Northern Ireland) Jamie Hamilton	Kawasaki 650cc	109.404 mph	1:02.04.57

Fastest Lap: Michael Rutter – 115.554 mph (19' 35.45) on lap 3.

==== 2012 Senior TT ====
Cancelled due to bad weather

== See also ==
- Manx Grand Prix
- North West 200
- Ulster Grand Prix

== Gallery ==
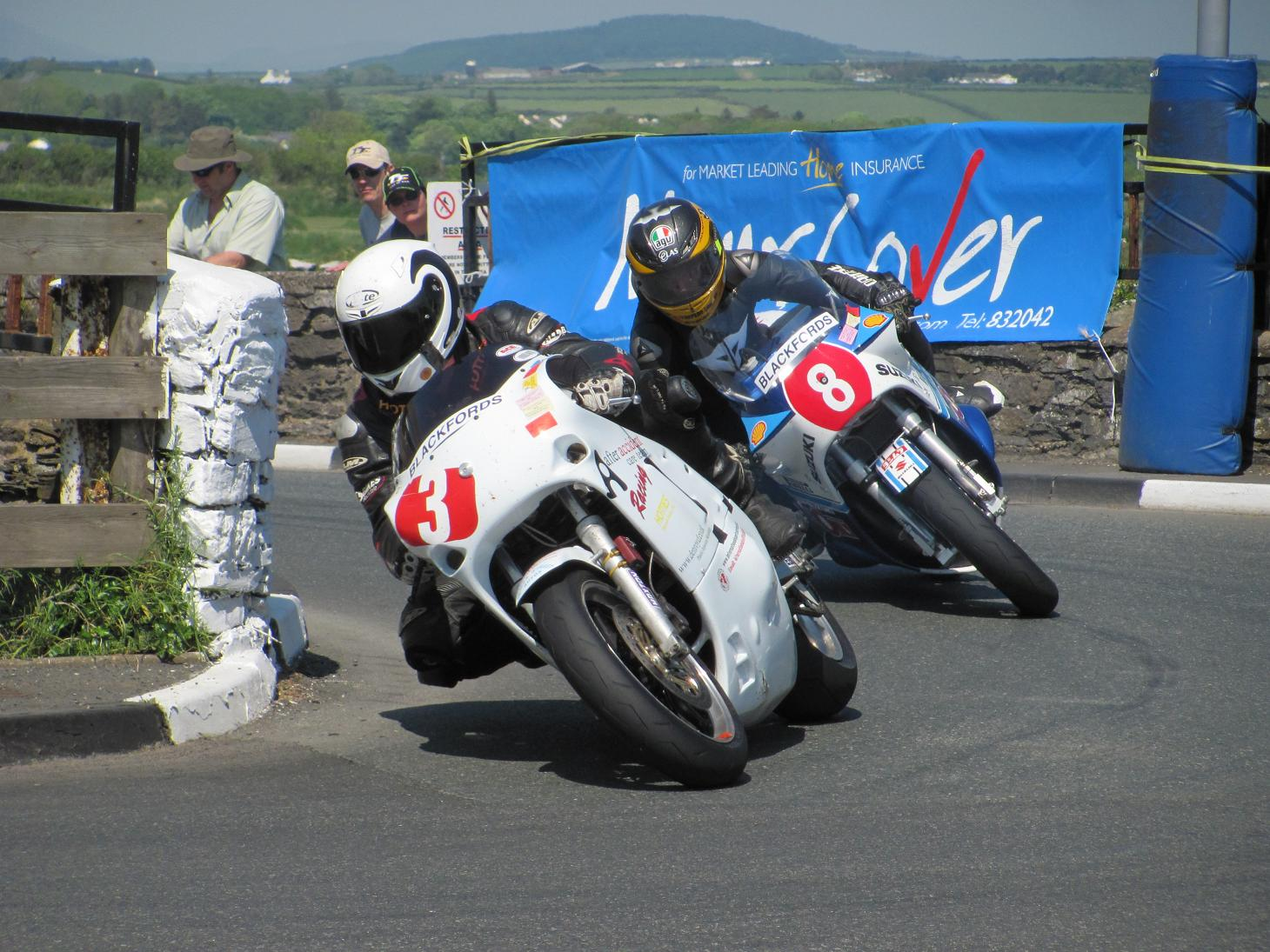
Pre-TT Classic Races – Race 7 Superbike Race; Jamie Coward (3), Guy Martin (8) 28 May 2012

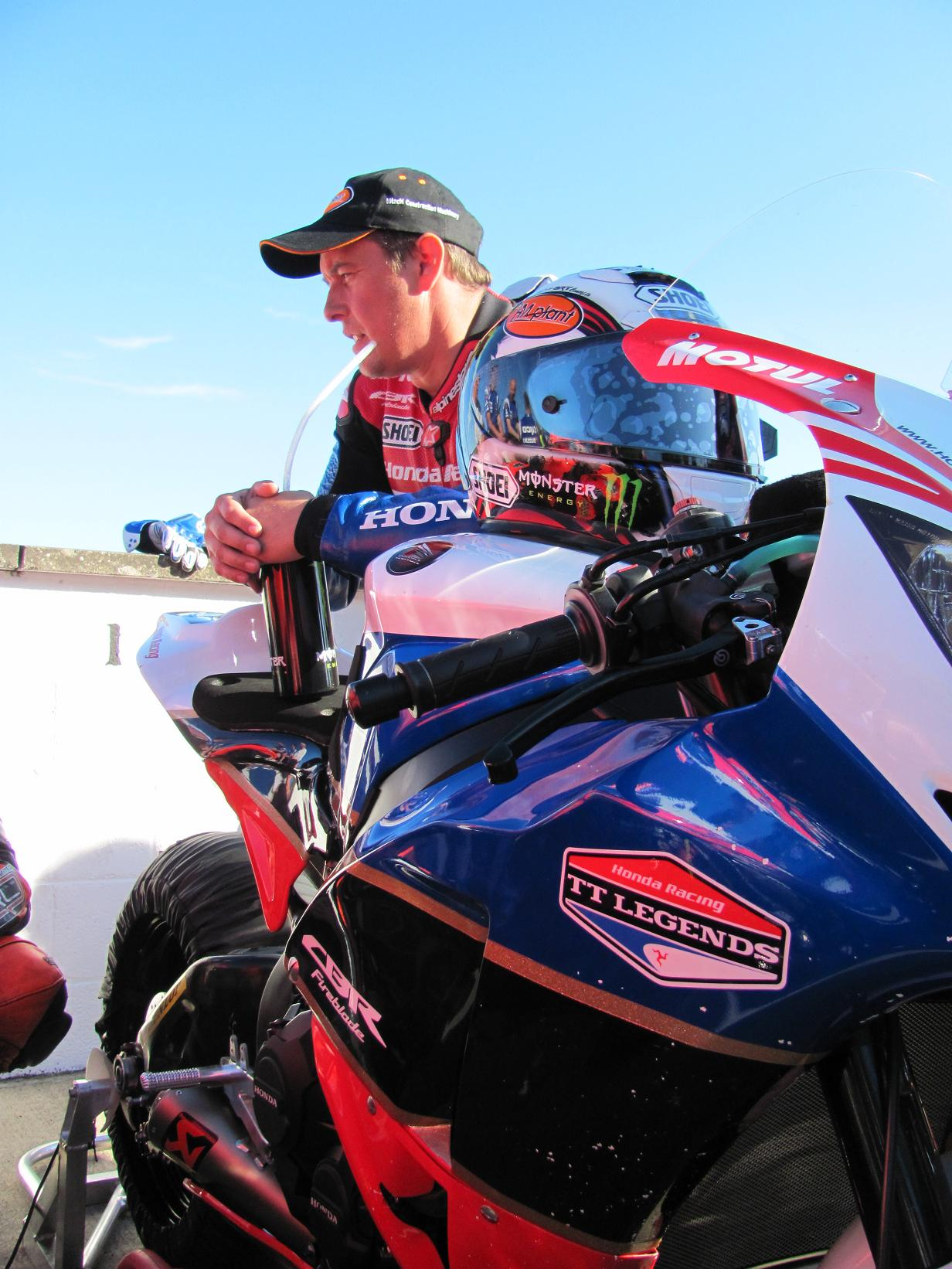
John McGuinness awaits the start of the Monday Evening Practice Session – 28 May 2012

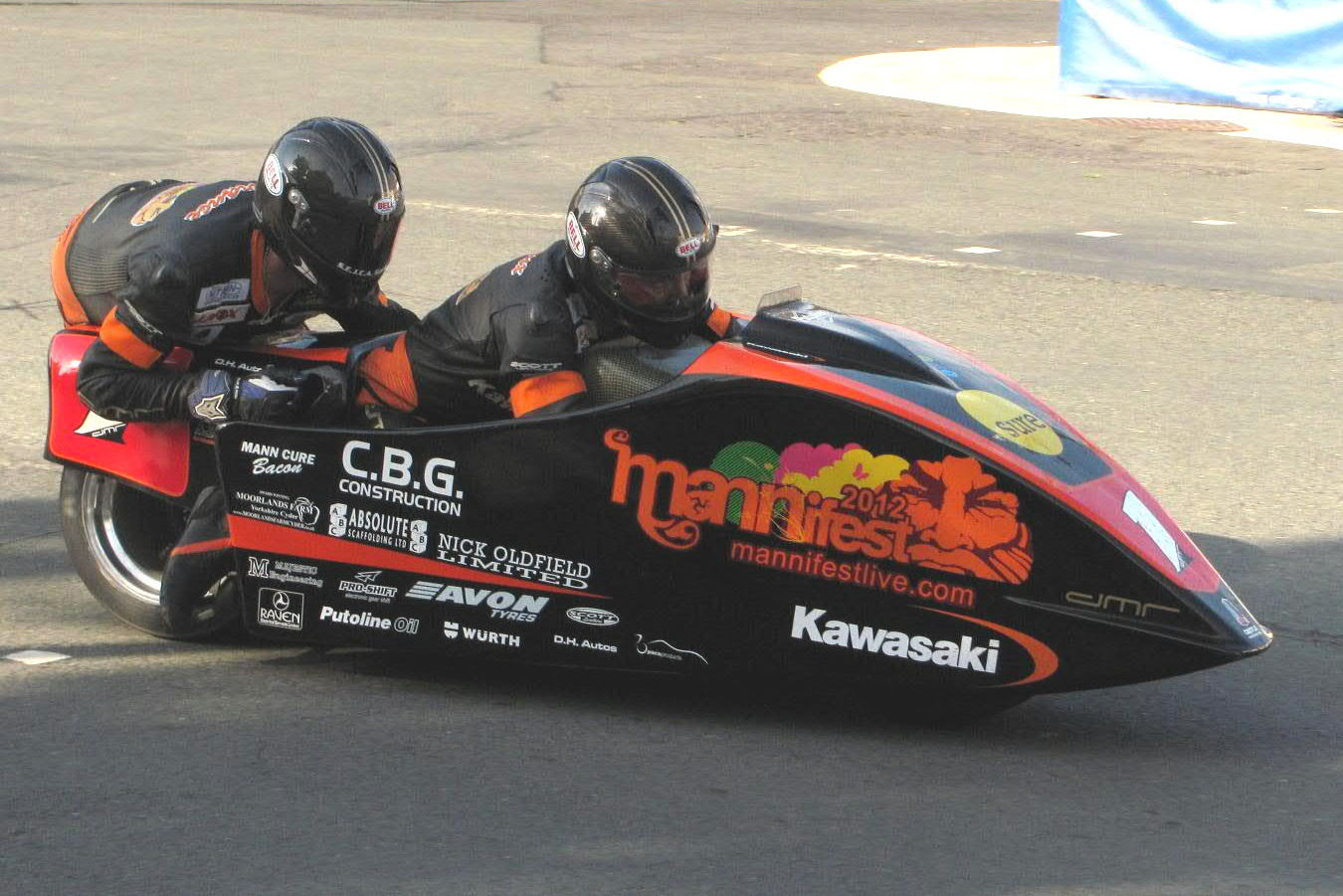
Thursday Evening Practice Dave Molyneux/Patrick Farrance DMR 600cc Parliament Square, Ramsey – 31 May 2012

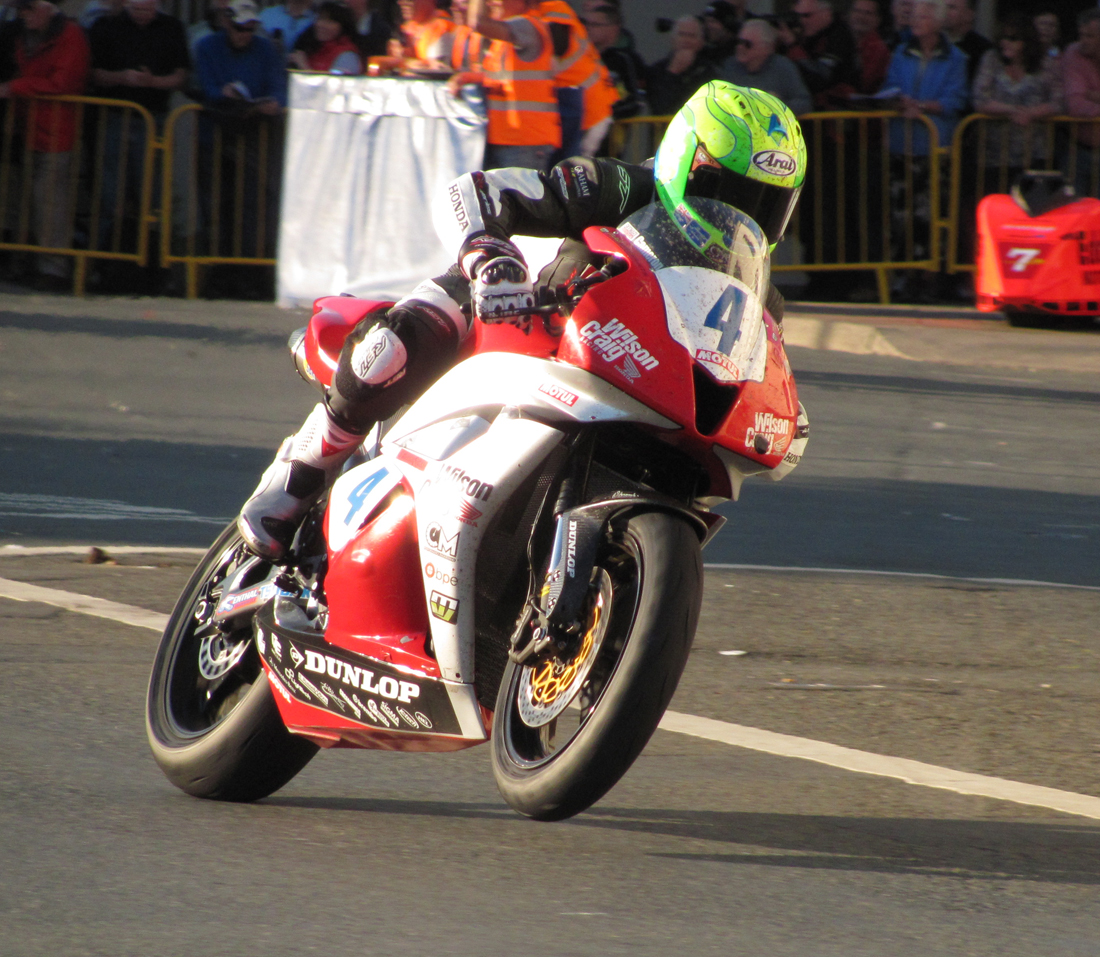
Friday Evening Practice Cameron Donald Supersport TT 600cc Honda Parliament Square, Ramsey – 1 June 2012

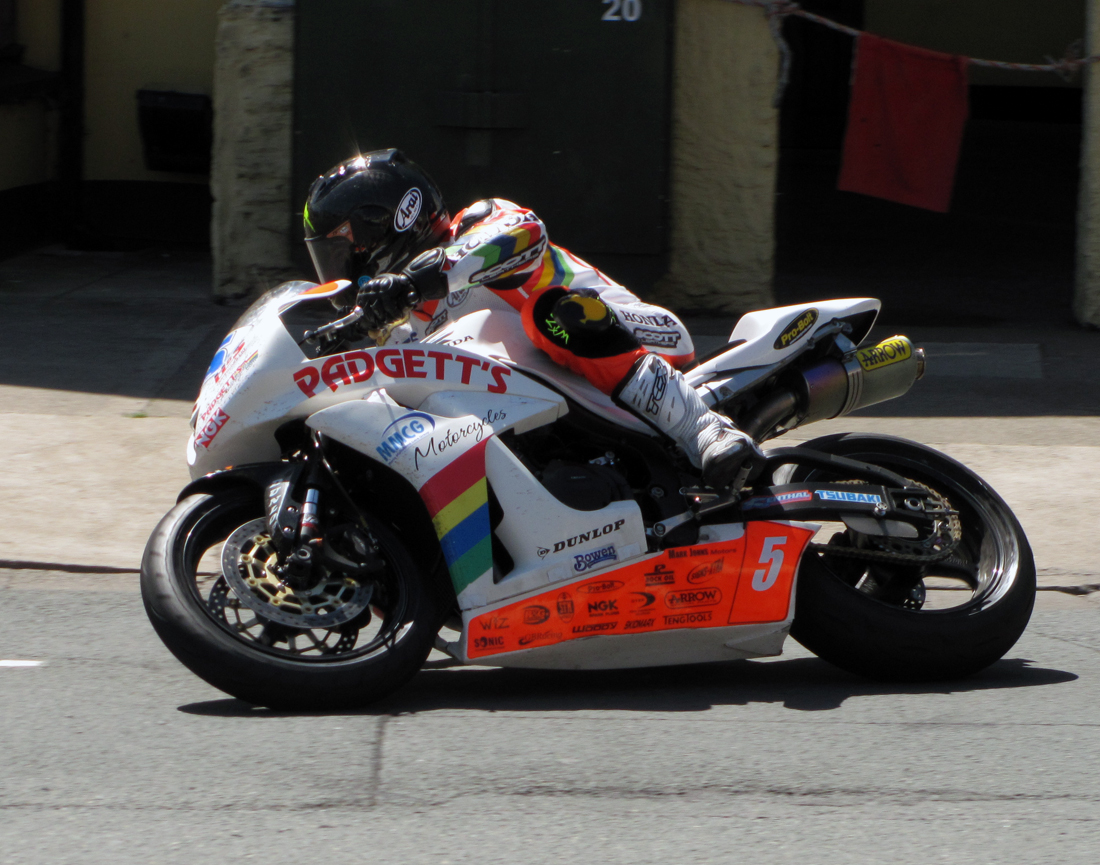
A delayed Supersport TT Race 1 is won by New Zealander Bruce Anstey 600cc Honda Parliament Square, Ramsey – 4 June 2012

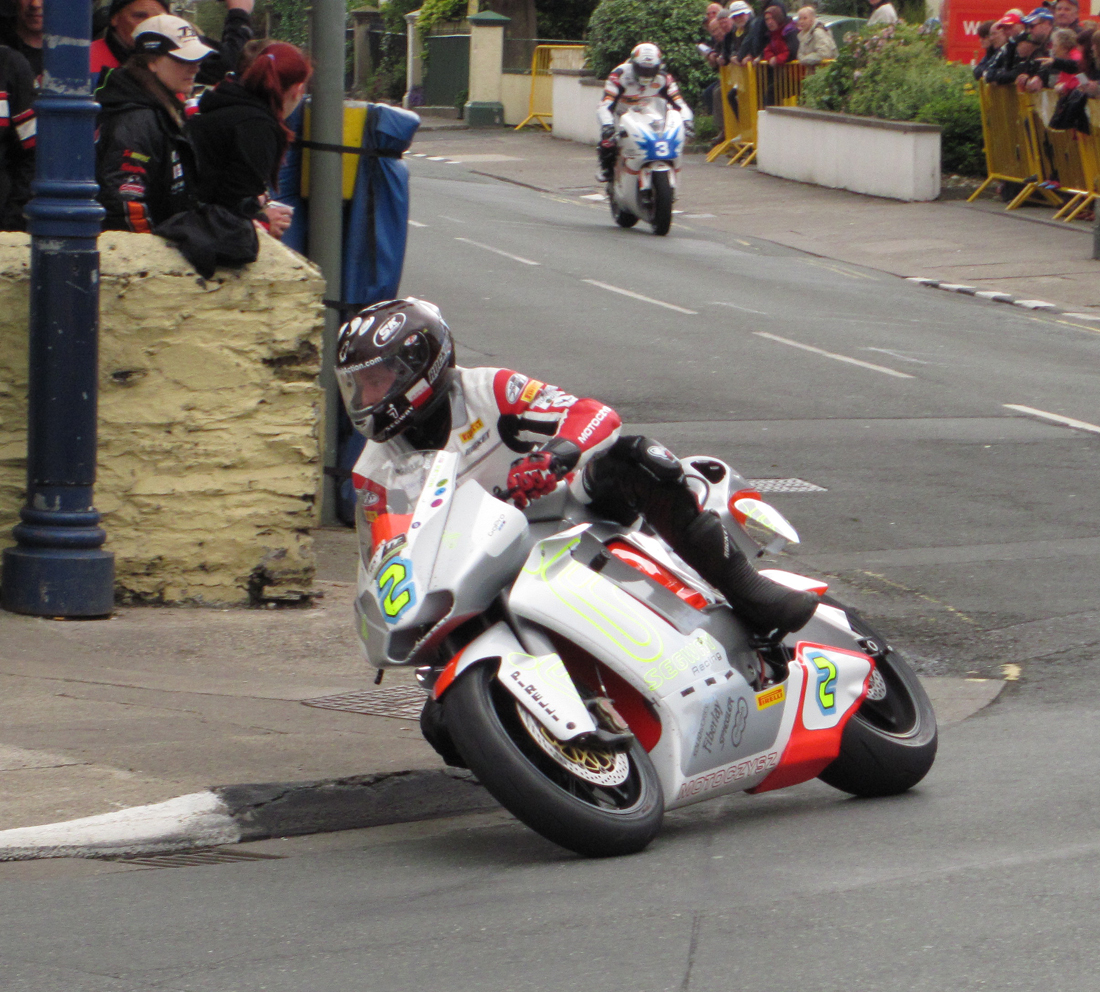
TT Zero Race – (2) Mark Miller MotoCzysz Elpc followed by (3) John McGuinness MUGEN Shinden in a race won by Michael Rutter MotoCzysz Elpc 6 June 2012

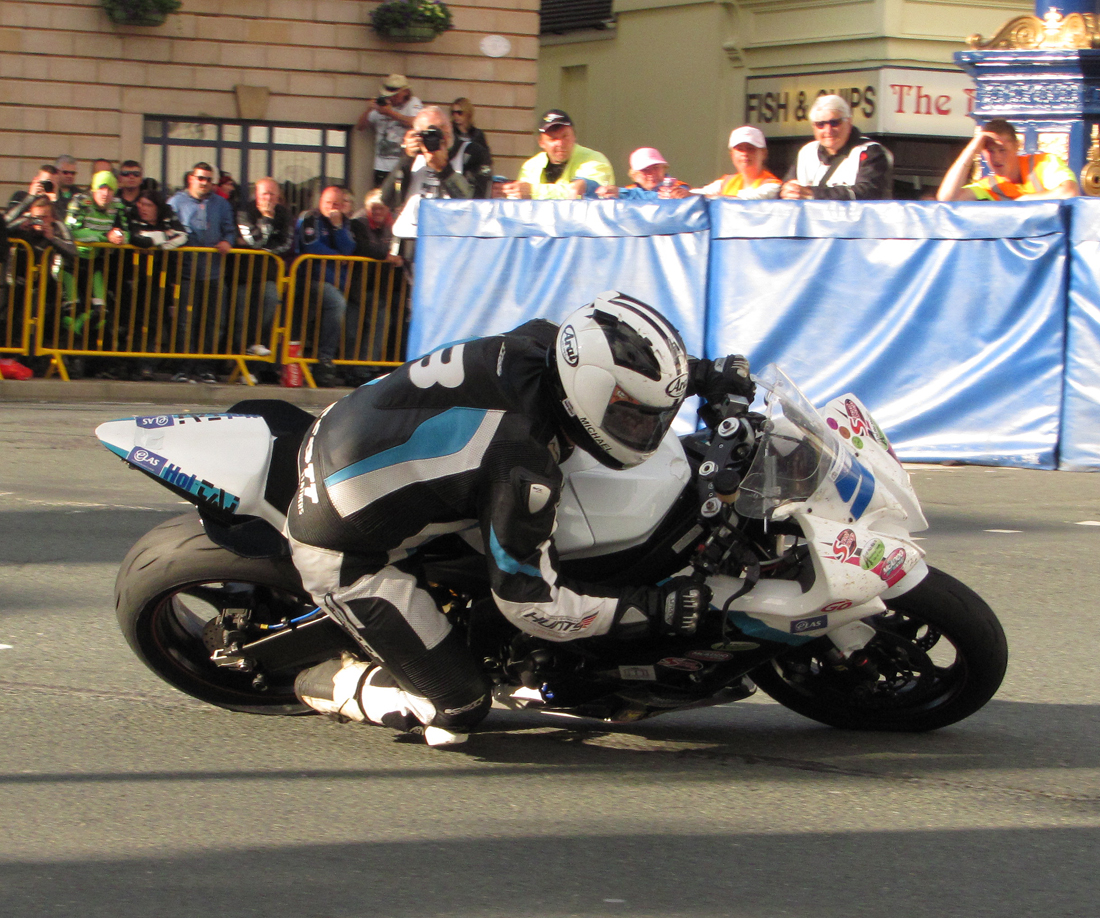
Supersport TT Race 2 Michael Dunlop Yamaha 600cc 6 June 2012

== Bibliography ==
- "Island Racer 2012: World's Biggest TT Guide". Island Racer. Mortons Media Group. 2012 – via Kelsey Publishing.
