= 2016 Isle of Man TT =

Annual motorcycle racing event

2016 Isle of Man TT Races
- Isle of Man TT Mountain Course layout

Race details
- Date: 27 May – 10 June 2016
- Location: Douglas, Isle of Man
- Course: Isle of Man TT Mountain Course; 37.733 mi (60.725 km)

The 2016 Isle of Man TT was held between 28 May and 10 June 2016, on the Isle of Man TT Mountain Course.

The event saw an intense rivalry between Ian Hutchinson and Michael Dunlop, with Hutchinson taking 3 wins, and Dunlop taking 2, including the Senior TT.

The event was marred by the death of 4 competitors: Dwight Beare, Paul Shoesmith, Ian Bell and Andrew Soar.

== Results ==
=== TT 2016 RST Superbike TT Results ===
Position	Number	Rider	Machine	Time	Speed
1	6	(Northern Ireland) Michael Dunlop	BMW	01:44:14.259	130.306
2	4	(England) Ian Hutchinson	BMW	01:44:33.323	129.910
3	1	(England) John McGuinness	Honda	01:45:27.498	128.798
4	5	(England) Peter Hickman	Kawasaki	01:45:44.951	128.444
5	12	(England) Dean Harrison	Kawasaki	01:46:09.896	127.941
6	9	(England) Michael Rutter	BMW	01:46:40.202	127.335
7	15	(Australia) David Johnson	Norton	01:46:56.430	127.013
8	2	(New Zealand) Bruce Anstey	Honda	01:47:05.936	126.825
9	7	(England) Gary Johnson	BMW	01:47:16.523	126.616
10	13	(Northern Ireland) Lee Johnston	BMW	01:47:16.614	126.614

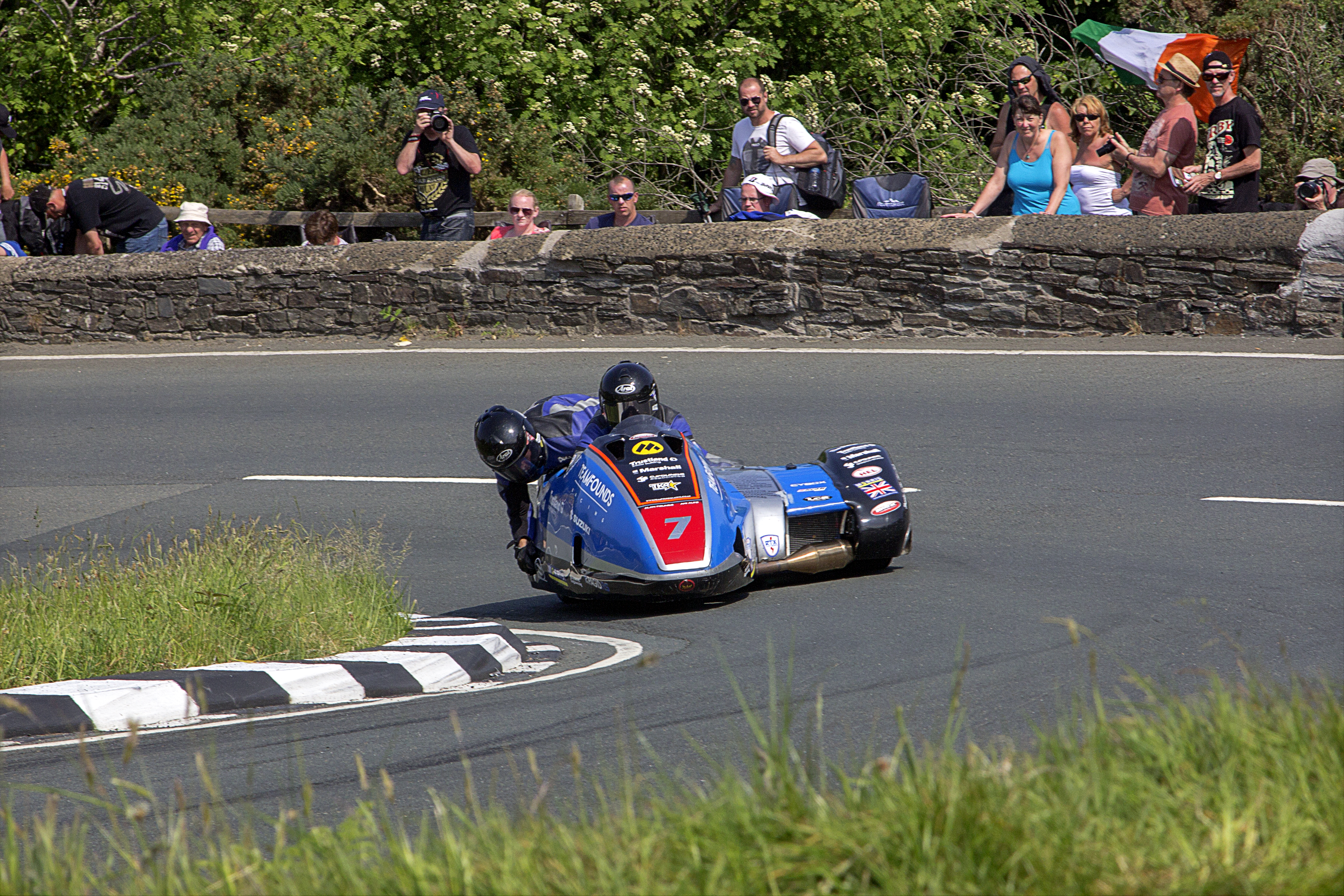
Alan Founds and Aki Aalto (pictured in practice) took third place in the opening Sidecar race.

=== TT 2016 Sure Sidecar TT 1 Results ===
Position	Number	Rider & Passenger	Machine	Time	Speed
1	3	John Holden & Andrew Winkle	LCR Honda	59:25.609	114.282
2	35	Pete Founds & Jevan Walmsley	Suzuki LCR	01:00:19.858	112.569
3	7	Alan Founds & Aki Aalto	LCR SUZUKI GSX-R	01:01:00.006	111.334
4	15	Stephen Ramsden & Matty Ramsden	LCR 600 RR	01:01:20.447	110.716
5	12	Matthew Dix & Shaun Parker	Baker	01:01:29.129	110.455
6	11	Wayne Lockey & Mark Sayers	Ireson Honda 600cc	01:01:51.410	109.792
7	8	Gary Bryan & Jamie Winn	Baker Honda	01:01:59.466	109.554
8	10	Gary Knight & Daniel Evanson	DrV	01:02:23.337	108.856
9	17	Gordon Shand & Philip Hyde	Shand Honda	01:03:05.111	107.654
10	13	Darren Hope & Paul Bumfrey	Suzuki DMR	01:03:06.754	107.608

=== TT 2016 Monster Energy Supersport TT 1 Results ===
Position	Number	Rider	Machine	Time	Speed
1	4	(England) Ian Hutchinson	Yamaha	01:11:36.808	126.445
2	12	(England) Dean Harrison	Kawasaki	01:12:29.720	124.907
3	3	(England) James Hillier	Kawasaki	01:12:47.770	124.391
4	10	(Isle of Man) Conor Cummins	Honda	01:12:48.506	124.370
5	1	(England) John McGuinness	Honda	01:12:53.286	124.234
6	13	(Northern Ireland) Lee Johnston	Triumph	01:13:32.704	123.125
7	8	(Northern Ireland) William Dunlop	Yamaha	01:13:51.684	122.597
8	25	(England) Steve Mercer	Honda	01:14:12.890	122.013
9	7	(England) Gary Johnson	Triumph	01:14:34.627	121.421
10	11	(Australia) Cameron Donald	Honda	01:14:45.843	121.117

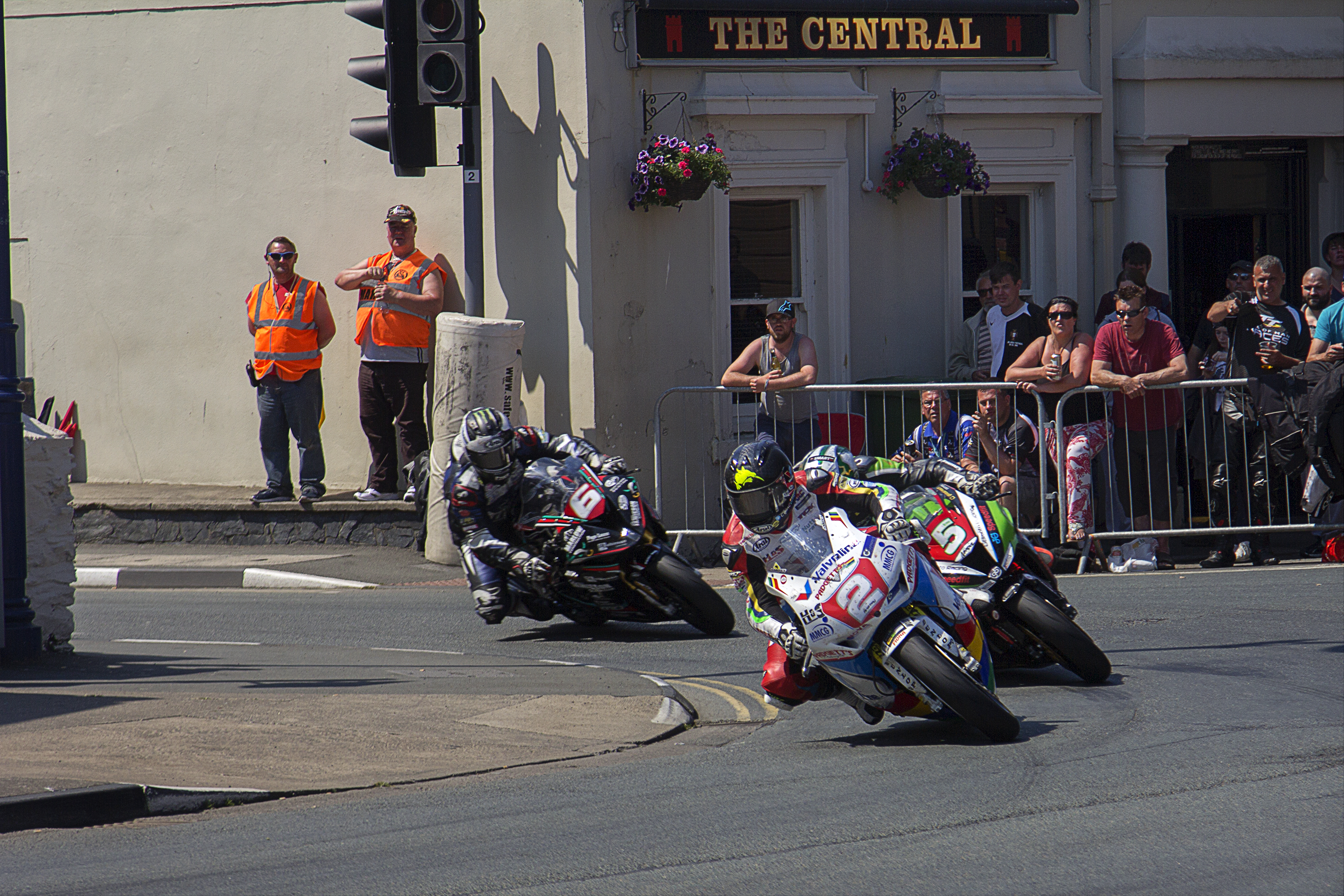
Bruce Anstey (#2), Peter Hickman(#5) and Michael Dunlop (#6) during the Superstock TT. All three had to retire from the race.

=== TT 2016 RL360 Quantum Superstock TT Results ===
Position	Number	Rider	Machine	Time	Speed
1	4	(England) Ian Hutchinson	BMW	01:09:47.543	129.745
2	12	(England) Dean Harrison	Kawasaki	01:10:15.187	128.894
3	3	(England) James Hillier	Kawasaki	01:10:17.092	128.836
4	9	(England) Michael Rutter	BMW	01:10:46.047	127.957
5	7	(England) Gary Johnson	BMW	01:10:49.292	127.859
6	1	(England) John McGuinness	Honda	01:10:58.053	127.596
7	10	(Isle of Man) Conor Cummins	Honda	01:11:26.858	126.739
8	8	(Northern Ireland) William Dunlop	Kawasaki	01:12:05.049	125.620
9	15	(Australia) David Johnson	BMW	01:12:11.448	125.434
10	19	(England) Steve Mercer	Honda	01:12:27.594	124.968

=== TT 2016 Monster Energy Supersport TT 2 Results ===
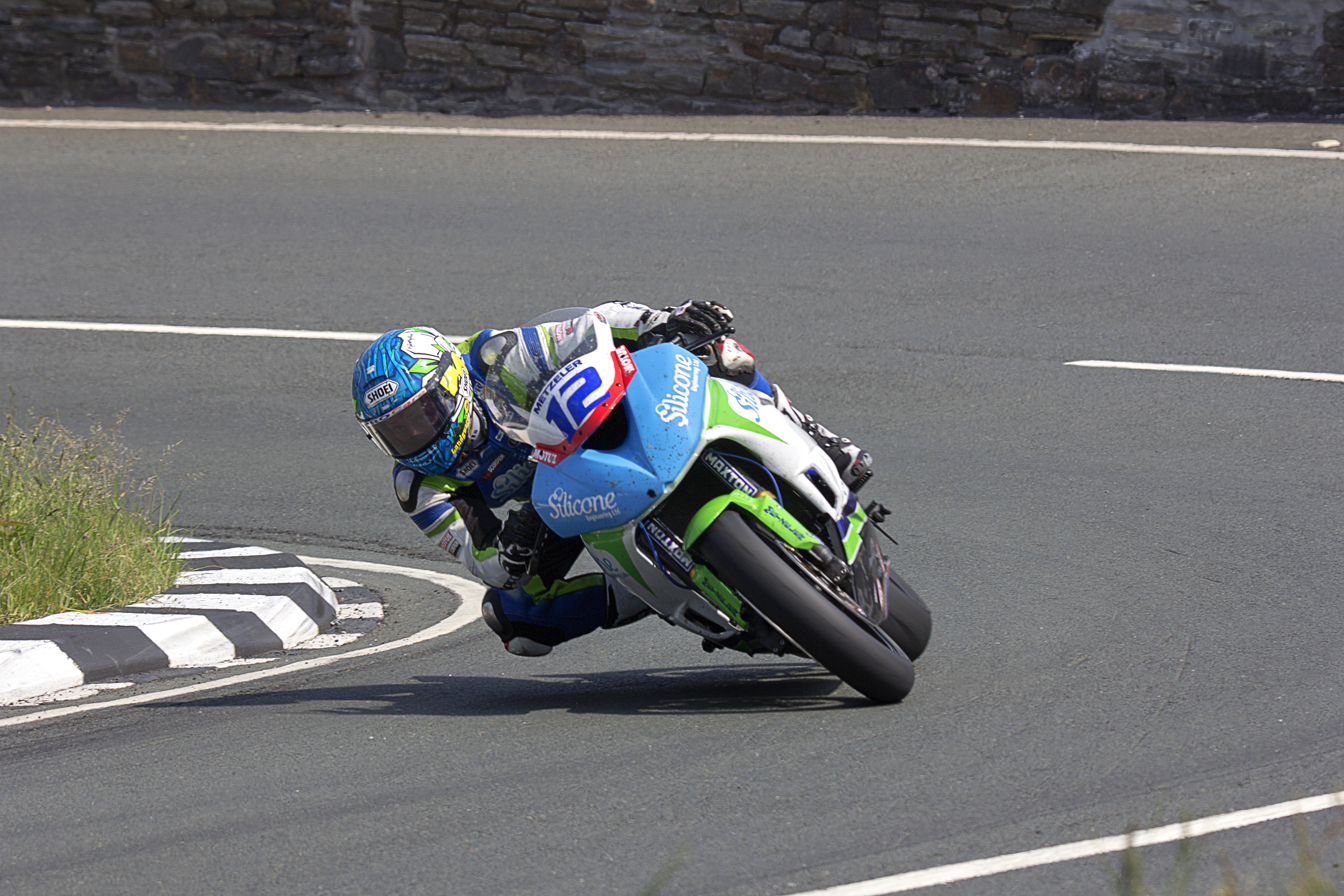
Dean Harrison took two podiums in the Supersport class.

Position	Number	Rider	Machine	Time	Speed
1	4	(England) Ian Hutchinson	Yamaha	01:11:55.261	125.905
2	6	(Northern Ireland) Michael Dunlop	Yamaha	01:12:12.808	125.395
3	12	(England) Dean Harrison	Kawasaki	01:12:29.452	124.915
4	3	(England) James Hillier	Kawasaki	01:12:42.986	124.528
5	2	(New Zealand) Bruce Anstey	Honda	01:12:44.287	124.490
6	13	(Northern Ireland) Lee Johnston	Triumph	01:12:44.950	124.472
7	10	(Isle of Man) Conor Cummins	Honda	01:12:48.719	124.364
8	5	(England) Peter Hickman	Kawasaki	01:13:14.311	123.640
9	7	(England) Gary Johnson	Triumph	01:13:38.285	122.969
10	9	(England) Michael Rutter	Kawasaki	01:13:39.394	122.938

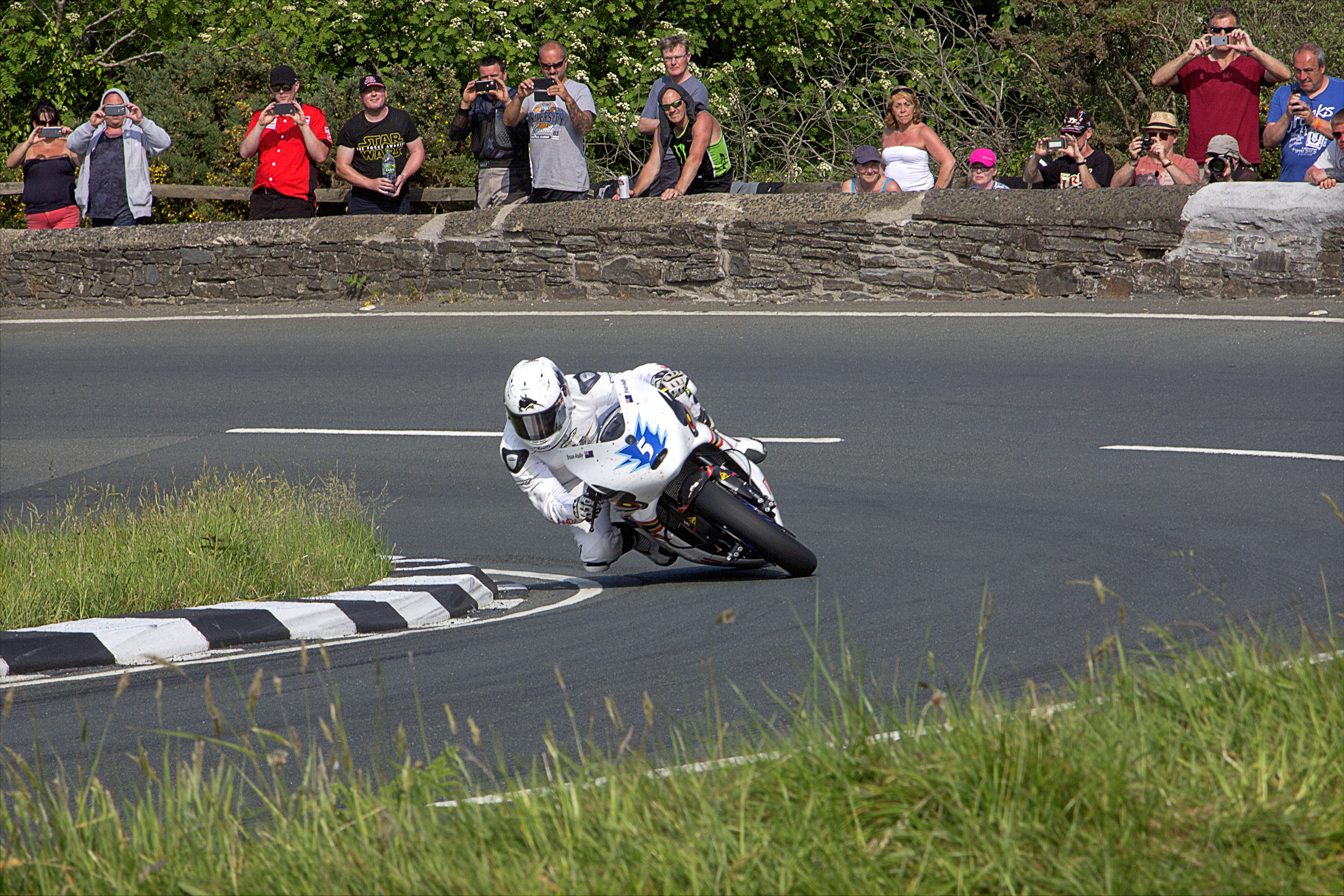
TT Zero winner Bruce Anstey

=== TT 2016 SES TT Zero Results ===
Position	Number	Rider	Machine	Time	Speed
1	5	(New Zealand) Bruce Anstey	Mugen	19:07.043	118.416
2	6	(Northern Ireland) William Dunlop	Victory	19:32.504	115.844
3	8	(England) Daley Mathison	University of Nottingham	22:39.864	99.884
4	1	(England) John McGuinness	Mugen	23:50.538	94.949
5	9	(South Africa) Allann Venter	Brunel	23:55.383	94.628

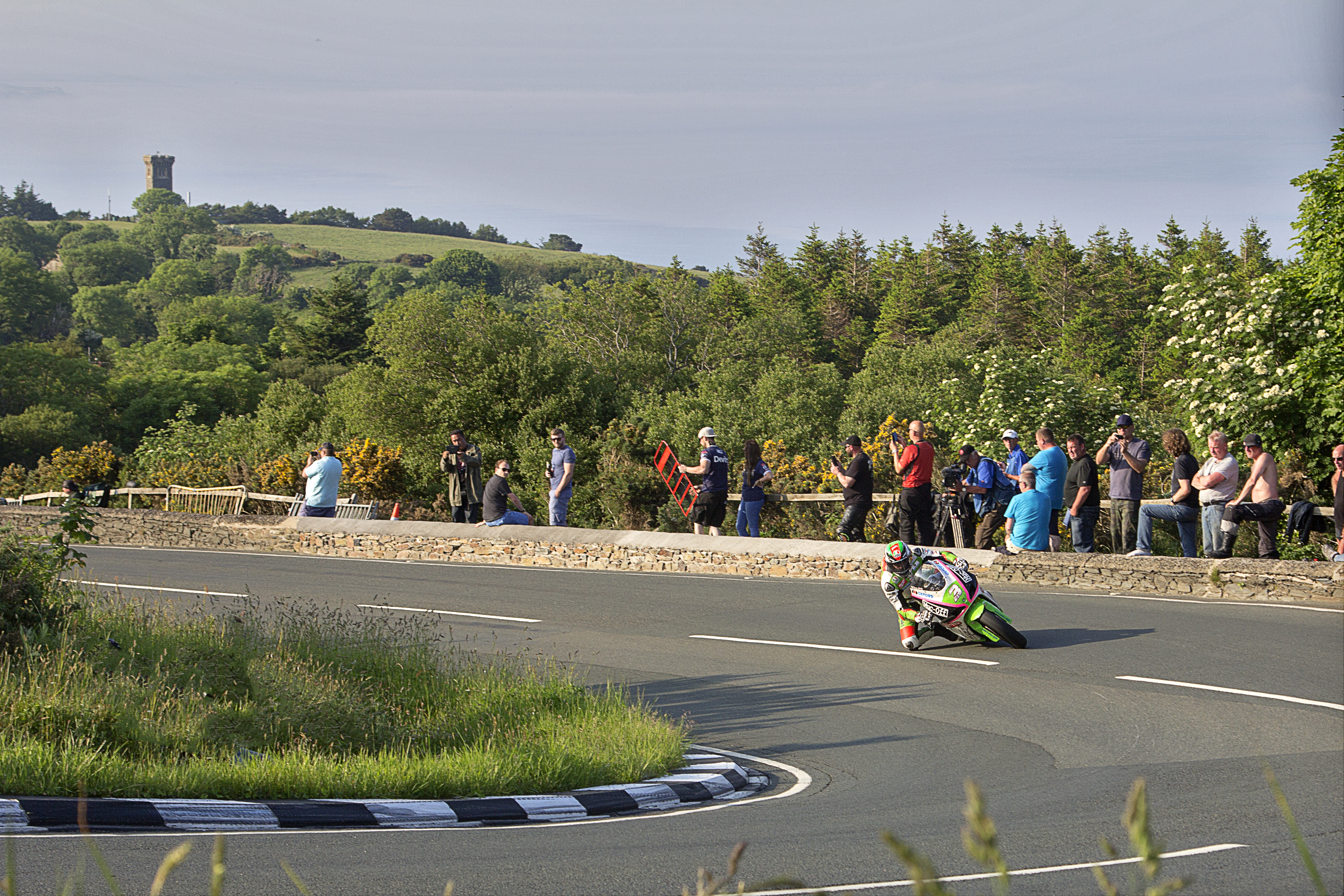
Second place finisher James Hillier during the Lightweight TT

=== TT 2016 Bennetts Lightweight TT Results ===
Position	Number	Rider	Machine	Time	Speed
1	6	(England) Ivan Lintin	Kawasaki	01:16:26.681	118.454
2	3	(England) James Hillier	Kawasaki	01:16:39.153	118.133
3	1	(England) Martin Jessopp	Kawasaki	01:18:23.536	115.511
4	7	(England) Gary Johnson	WK Bikes	01:18:25.920	115.453
5	33	(Italy) Stefano Bonetti	Paton	01:18:30.782	115.334
6	10	(England) Daniel Cooper	Kawasaki	01:19:06.561	114.464
7	29	(England) James Coward	Kawasaki	01:19:37.988	113.711
8	38	(England) Colin Stephenson	Suzuki	01:20:24.695	112.611
9	20	(Sweden) Bjorn Gunnarsson	Kawasaki	01:20:25.519	112.591
10	11	(England) James Cowton	Kawasaki	01:20:30.711	112.470

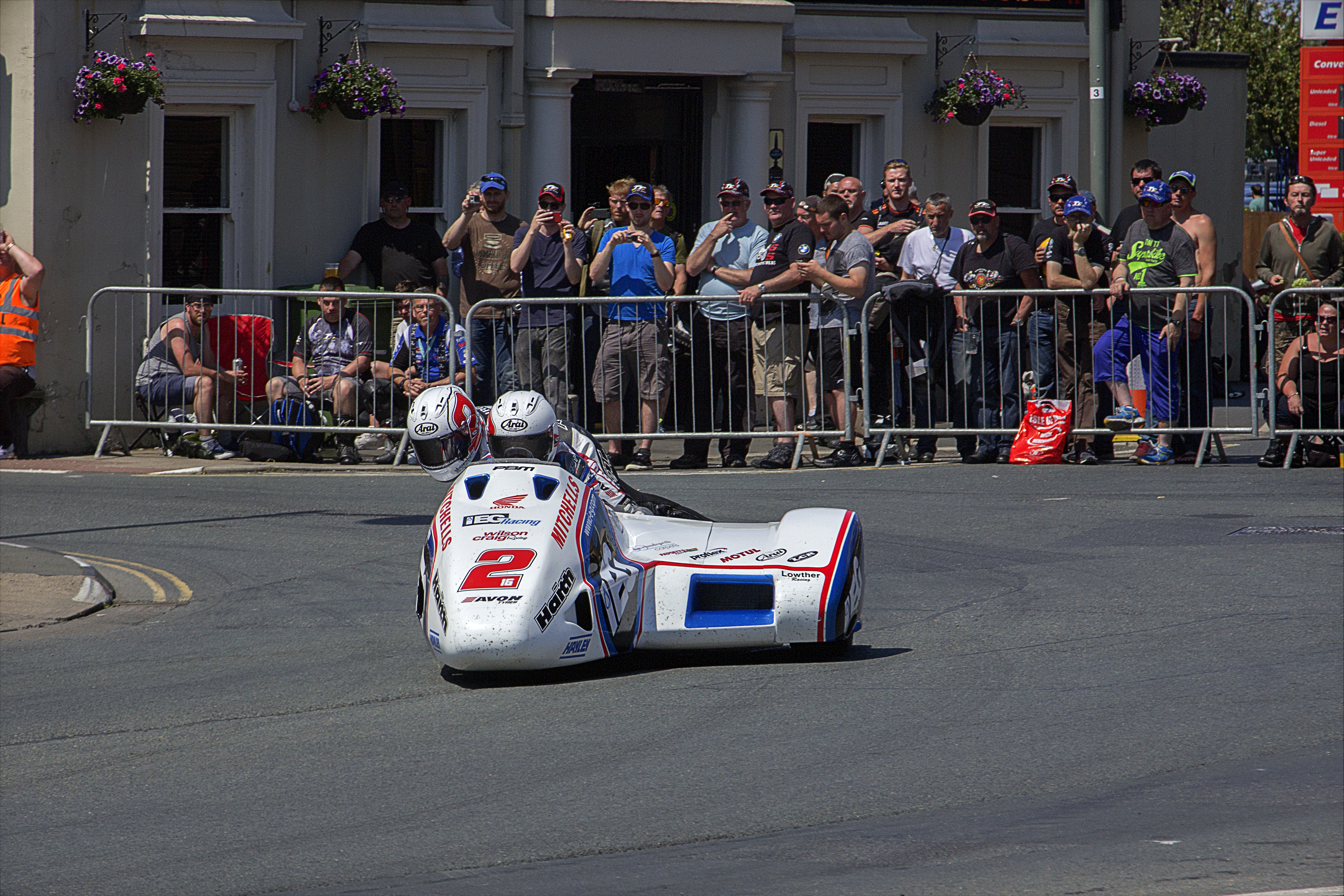
Ben and Tom Birchall (pictured in practice) took their 4th TT win in race 2.

=== TT 2016 Sure Sidecar TT 2 Results ===
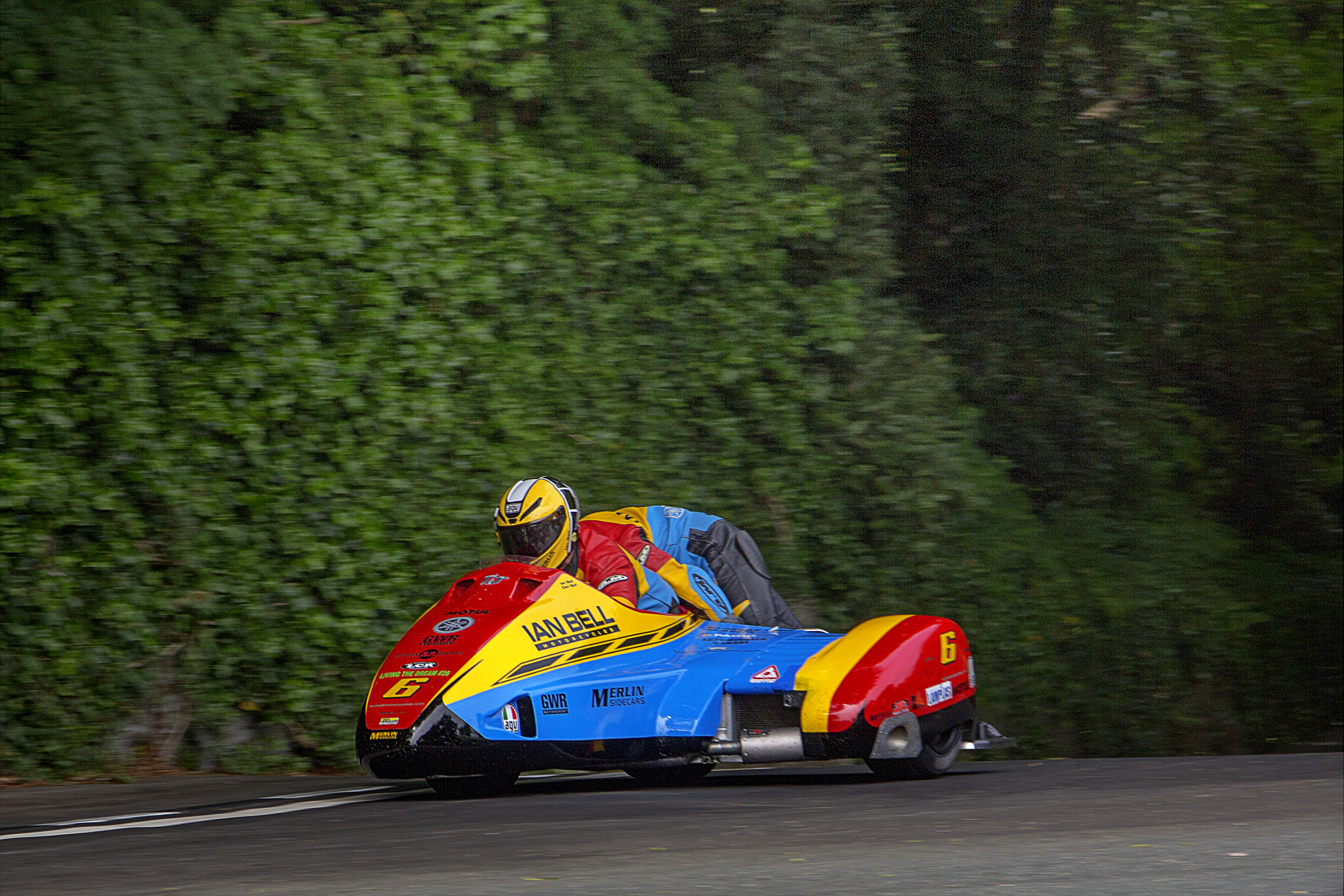
The second sidecar race was marred by the death of Ian Bell.

Position	Number	Rider & Passenger	Machine	Time	Speed
1	2	(England) Ben Birchall & (England) Tom Birchall	LCR Honda	58:43.187	115.658
2	3	(England) John Holden & Andrew Winkle	LCR Honda	59:21.971	114.398
3	4	(England) Tim Reeves & Patrick Farrance	DMR Honda	59:40.371	113.811
4	9	Karl Bennett & Lee Cain	DMR	01:01:03.336	111.233
5	12	Matthew Dix & Shaun Parker	Baker	01:01:27.058	110.517
6	15	Stephen Ramsden & Matty Ramsden	LCR	01:01:37.240	110.213
7	7	(England) Alan Founds & (Finland) Aki Aalto	LCR Suzuki	01:01:50.291	109.825
8	8	Gary Bryan & Jamie Winn	Baker Honda	01:01:53.080	109.743
9	16	Tony Baker & Fiona Baker-Milligan	Suzuki	01:02:04.277	109.413
10	17	Gordon Shand & Philip Hyde	Shand Honda	01:02:55.143	107.939

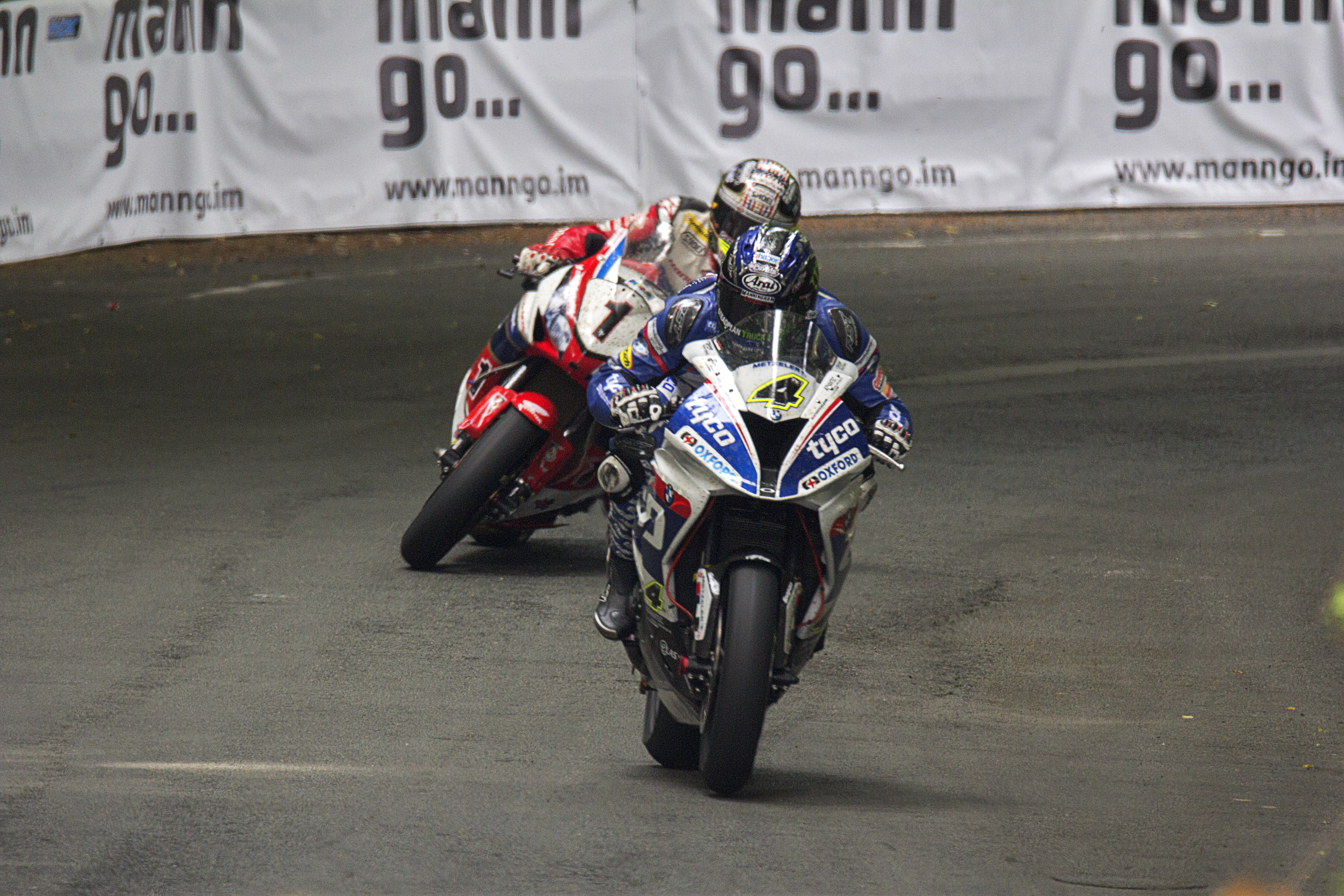
Ian Hutchinson (2nd place) in front of John McGuinness (3rd place) at the Senior TT

=== TT 2016 PokerStars Senior TT Results ===
Position	Number	Rider	Machine	Time	Speed
1	6	(Northern Ireland) Michael Dunlop	BMW	01:43:56.129	130.685
2	4	(England) Ian Hutchinson	BMW	01:44:27.605	130.029
3	1	(England) John McGuinness	Honda	01:44:58.651	129.388
4	12	(England) Dean Harrison	Kawasaki	01:45:51.385	128.313
5	2	(New Zealand) Bruce Anstey	Honda	01:46:08.108	127.976
6	10	(Isle of Man) Conor Cummins	Honda	01:46:11.570	127.907
7	9	(England) Michael Rutter	BMW	01:46:20.009	127.738
8	13	(Northern Ireland) Lee Johnston	BMW	01:47:00.201	126.938
9	3	(England) James Hillier	Kawasaki	01:47:03.679	126.869
10	20	(England) Ivan Lintin	Kawasaki	01:48:22.931	125.323

== Wins table ==
	Rider	Wins
1	(England) Ian Hutchinson	3
2	(Northern Ireland) Michael Dunlop	2
2	(England) Ben Birchall	2
2	(England) Tom Birchall	2
5	(New Zealand) Bruce Anstey	1
5	(England) Ivan Lintin	1

== Special awards ==
Award	Trophy	Rider(s)	Machine
TT Solo Championship	Joey Dunlop Trophy	Ian Hutchinson	BMW S1000RRYamaha YZF-R6
TT Privateer's Champion	TT Privateer's Champion	Daniel Hegarty	Kawasaki Ninja ZX-10R
Overall Sidecar Championship	RAC Sidecar Trophy	John Holden and Andrew Winkle	LCR Suzuki 600 cc
Sidecar Passenger Championship	Craig Trophy	Andrew Winkle	LCR Suzuki 600 cc
Supersport Championship	TT Supporters' Club Trophy	Ian Hutchinson	Yamaha YZF-R6
Sidecar Chassis Championship	Fred Hanks Trophy	John Holden and Andrew Winkle	LCR Suzuki 600 cc
Irish (North or South) solo competitor	Martin Finnegan Trophy	Michael Dunlop	BMW S1000RR
Most meritous female competitor	Susan Jenness Trophy	Maria Costello	

== Bibliography ==
- "Island Racer 2016: The Ultimate TT Fan Companion". Island Racer. Mortons Media Group. 2016. SKU: 3021943 – via Kelsey Publishing.
