= 2018 Isle of Man TT =

Annual motorcycle racing event

2018 Isle of Man TT Races
- Isle of Man TT Mountain Course layout

Race details
- Date: 26 May, 2018 – 8 June, 2018
- Location: Douglas, Isle of Man
- Course: Isle of Man TT Mountain Course; 37.733 mi (60.725 km)

The 2018 Isle of Man TT was held between 26 May and 8 June, on the Isle of Man TT Mountain Course.

Michael Dunlop scored 3 wins during the event, increasing his TT win tally to 18. Peter Hickman took his first two TT wins, including one at the prestigious Senior TT, taking a new outright lap record of 135.452 mph (217.989 km/h) in the process. The Birchall brothers took the two Sidecar races and a new lap record, becoming the first crew to lap the course in under 19 minutes. Dean Harrison and Michael Rutter took one TT each.

23-times TT winner John McGuinness was a major absentee for the second year in a row, due to serious injuries sustained at the 2017 North West 200. Two times 2017 Isle of Man TT winner Ian Hutchinson was also recovering from serious leg injuries sustained during the 2017 Senior TT, and failed to score a single top 10 in 2018.

The event was marred by the death of two riders, 2017 TT podium finisher Dan Kneen, and TT newcomer Adam Lyon. In the aftermath of Kneen's crash, Steve Mercer suffered serious, career-ending injuries after being hit head-on by a course car travelling in the opposite direction.

== Results ==
=== Superbike TT ===
Position	Number	Rider	Machine	Time	Speed (mph)
1	6	(Northern Ireland) Michael Dunlop	BMW	01:44:13.398	130.324
2	1	(Isle of Man) Conor Cummins	Honda	01:45:04.259	129.273
3	2	(England) James Hillier	Kawasaki	01:45:25.919	128.830
4	9	(Australia) David Johnson	BMW	01:45:58.637	128.167
5	3	(England) Michael Rutter	BMW	01:47:27.374	126.403
6	13	(Northern Ireland) Lee Johnston	Honda	01:47:42.014	126.117
7	12	(England) Martin Jessopp	BMW	01:48:04.898	125.672
8	23	(England) Ivan Lintin	Kawasaki	01:48:07.017	125.631
9	18	(England) Philip Crowe	BMW	01:48:12.101	125.532
10	11	(Australia) Josh Brookes	Norton	01:48:14.276	125.490

=== Supersport TT 1 ===
Position	Number	Rider	Machine	Time	Speed (mph)
1	6	(Northern Ireland) Michael Dunlop	Honda	01:11:51.072	126.027
2	5	(England) Dean Harrison	Kawasaki	01:12:01.350	125.727
3	10	(England) Peter Hickman	Triumph	01:12:01.608	125.720
4	2	(England) James Hillier	Kawasaki	01:12:03.414	125.667
5	1	(Isle of Man) Conor Cummins	Honda	01:12:44.356	124.488
6	11	(Australia) Josh Brookes	Yamaha	01:12:57.357	124.119
7	7	(England) Gary Johnson	Triumph	01:13:06.152	123.870
8	3	(Northern Ireland) Lee Johnston	Honda	01:13:12.190	123.700
9	19	(England) James Cowton	Kawasaki	01:13:45.145	122.778
10	18	(England) Ivan Lintin	Kawasaki	01:13:54.952	122.507

=== Sidecar TT 1 ===
Position	Number	Rider	Machine	Time	Speed (mph)
1	1	(England) Ben Birchall & (England) Tom Birchall	Honda CBR	57:33.635	117.987
2	3	(England) John Holden & Lee Cain	Honda LCR	58:20.767	116.398
3	5	(England) Tim Reeves & Mark Wilkes	Honda	58:42.668	115.675
4	6	(England) Pete Founds & Jevan Walmsley	Suzuki	59:30.256	114.133
5	4	(England) Alan Founds & Jake Lowther	Yamaha	01:01:16.994	110.820
6	10	(England) Conrad Harrison & Andrew Winkle	Honda Rod Bellas	01:01:33.593	110.322
7	21	Darren Hope & Lenny Bumfrey	LCR Suzuki	01:02:14.600	109.110
8	29	Gary Gibson & Daryl Gibson	Shelbourne Suzuki	01:02:33.444	108.563
9	9	Gary Bryan & Philip Hyde	Baker Honda	01:03:03.297	107.706
10	18	Greg Lambert & Julie Canipa	Honda GLR	01:03:15.195	107.368

=== Superstock TT ===
Position	Number	Rider	Machine	Time	Speed (mph)
1	10	(England) Peter Hickman	BMW	01:08:49.976	131.553
2	6	(Northern Ireland) Michael Dunlop	BMW	01:08:54.428	131.412
3	5	(England) Dean Harrison	Kawasaki	01:09:03.579	131.121
4	9	(Australia) David Johnson	BMW	01:10:16.337	128.859
5	2	(England) James Hillier	Kawasaki	01:10:21.259	128.709
6	3	(England) Michael Rutter	BMW	01:10:51.480	127.794
7	12	(England) Martin Jessopp	BMW	01:11:43.806	126.240
8	27	(England) Sam West	BMW	01:11:47.242	126.139
9	23	(England) Ivan Lintin	Kawasaki	01:11:49.149	126.083
10	80	(England) Davey Todd	Suzuki	01:11:50.396	126.047

=== Supersport TT 2 ===
Position	Number	Rider	Machine	Time	Speed (mph)
1	5	(England) Dean Harrison	Kawasaki	01:11:28.059	126.703
2	10	(England) Peter Hickman	Triumph	01:11:46.730	126.154
3	2	(England) James Hillier	Kawasaki	01:11:58.508	125.810
4	1	(Isle of Man) Conor Cummins	Honda	01:12:08.333	125.525
5	6	(Northern Ireland) Michael Dunlop	Honda	01:12:14.160	125.356
6	11	(Australia) Josh Brookes	Yamaha	01:12:51.195	124.294
7	3	(Northern Ireland) Lee Johnston	Honda	01:13:05.465	123.889
8	7	(England) Gary Johnson	Triumph	01:13:25.657	123.321
9	19	(England) James Cowton	Kawasaki	01:13:28.648	123.238
10	18	(England) Ivan Lintin	Kawasaki	01:13:39.852	122.925

=== Lightweight TT ===
Position	Number	Rider	Machine	Time	Speed (mph)
1	6	(Northern Ireland) Michael Dunlop	Paton	01:15:05.032	120.601
2	15	(Republic of Ireland) Derek McGee	Kawasaki	01:15:19.633	120.212
3	3	(England) Michael Rutter	Paton	01:16:30.242	118.362
4	8	(Italy) Stefano Bonetti	Paton	01:16:40.194	118.106
5	32	(England) Joey Thompson	Paton	01:18:13.175	115.766
6	9	(Wales) Ian Lougher	Paton	01:18:26.857	115.430
7	13	(Republic of Ireland) Michael Sweeney	Kawasaki	01:18:27.273	115.420
8	12	(Northern Ireland) Adam Mclean	Kawasaki	01:18:38.044	115.156
9	31	(Austria) Julian Trummer	Kawasaki	01:19:04.182	114.522
10	55	(England) Dominic Herbertson	Kawasaki	01:19:12.721	114.316

=== TT Zero ===
Position	Number	Rider	Machine	Time	Speed (mph)
1	1	(England) Michael Rutter	Mugen	18:34.956	121.824
2	3	(England) Daley Mathison	University of Nottingham	18:58.600	119.294
3	2	(Northern Ireland) Lee Johnston	Mugen	21:26.668	105.566
4	4	(Northern Ireland) James Cowton	Brunel	23:14.934	97.372
5	14	(England) Adam Child	Moto Corsa	27:50.042	81.332
6	9	(Northern Ireland) Shaun Anderson	Brammo	30:16.155	74.789

=== Sidecar TT 2 ===
Position	Number	Rider	Machine	Time	Speed (mph)
1	1	(England) Ben Birchall & Tom Birchall	Honda CBR	57:25.040	118.281
2	3	(England) John Holden & Lee Cain	Honda LCR	57:47.960	117.500
3	5	(England) Tim Reeves & Mark Wilkes	Honda	58:03.738	116.967
4	4	(England) Alan Founds & Jake Lowther	Yamaha	59:20.780	114.437
5	12	Lewis Blackstock & Patrick Rosney	Honda LCR	01:00:21.459	112.519
6	10	(England) Conrad Harrison & Andrew Winkle	Honda Rod Bellas	01:00:37.918	112.010
7	9	Gary Bryan & Philip Hyde	Baker Honda	01:00:48.452	111.687
8	8	Stephen Ramsden & Matty Ramsden	LCR	01:00:58.064	111.393
9	17	Estelle Leblond & Melanie Farnier	SGR Suzuki	01:01:36.707	110.229
10	29	Gary Gibson & Daryl Gibson	Shelbourne Suzuki	01:02:13.039	109.156

=== Senior TT ===
Position	Number	Rider	Machine	Time	Speed (mph)
1	10	(England) Peter Hickman	BMW	01:43:08.065	131.700
2	5	(England) Dean Harrison	Kawasaki	01:43:10.126	131.656
3	1	(Isle of Man) Conor Cummins	Honda	01:44:50.559	129.554
4	6	(Northern Ireland) Michael Dunlop	BMW	01:45:45.315	128.436
5	11	(Australia) Josh Brookes	Norton	01:46:09.904	127.940
6	7	(England) Gary Johnson	Kawasaki	01:47:06.818	126.807
7	12	(England) Martin Jessopp	BMW	01:47:58.408	125.798
8	16	(Northern Ireland) James Cowton	BMW	01:48:27.787	125.230
9	80	(England) Davey Todd	Suzuki	01:49:00.059	124.612
10	32	(Republic of Ireland) Brian McCormack	BMW	01:49:04.383	124.529

== Wins table ==
	Rider	Wins
1	(Northern Ireland) Michael Dunlop	3
2	(England) Ben Birchall	2
2	(England) Tom Birchall	2
2	(England) Peter Hickman	2
5	(England) Dean Harrison	1
5	(England) Michael Rutter	1

== Bibliography ==
- "Island Racer 2018: Isle of Man TT Racing Guide". Island Racer. Mortons Media Group. 2018. SKU: 3985114 – via Kelsey Publishing.
