= 2010 Southern 100 Races =

(Isle of Man) 2010 Southern 100 Races
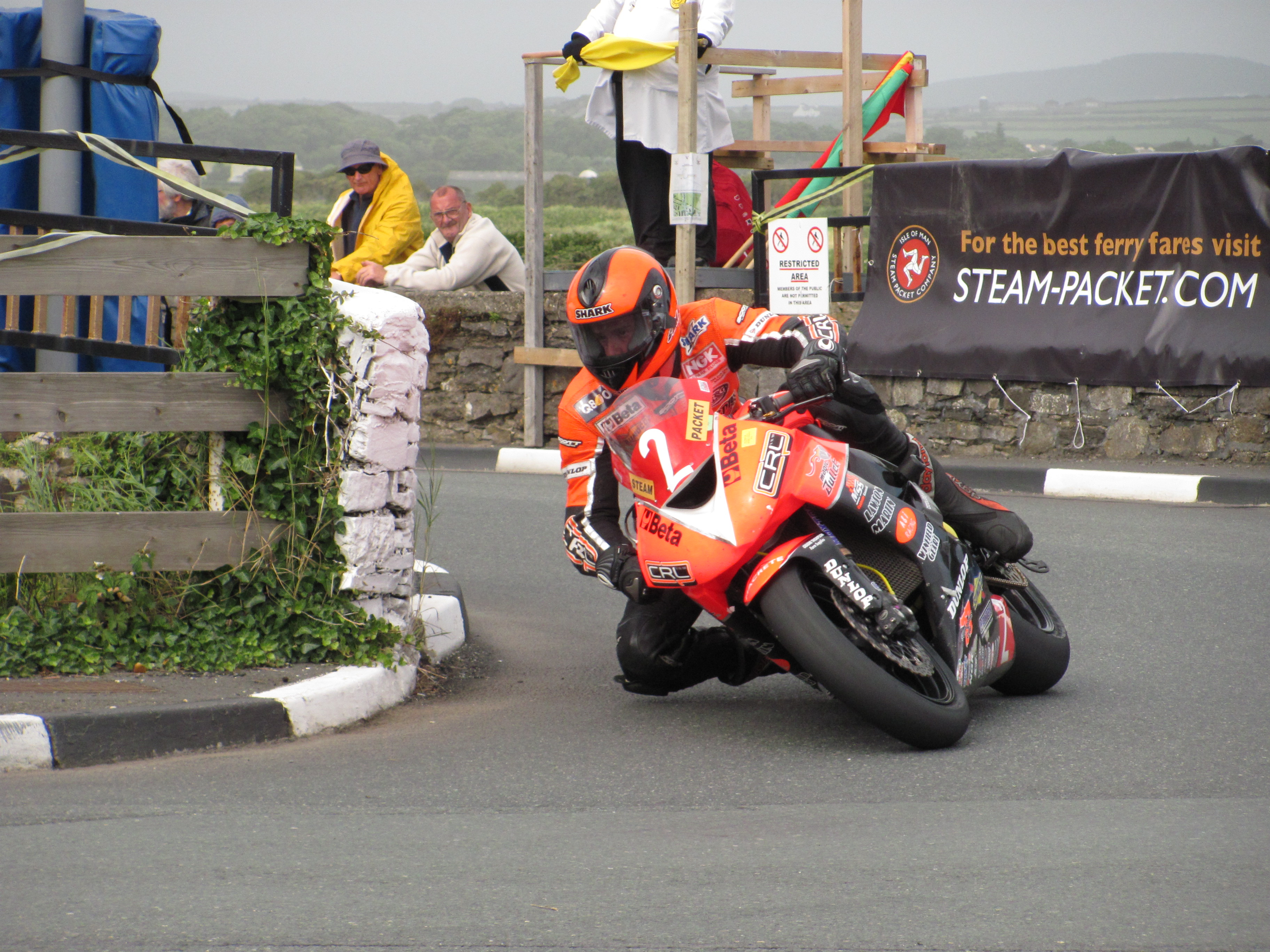
- Ryan Farquhar, 1000cc Kawasaki, the winner of the 2010 Southern 100 Solo Championship.

Race details
Date	12–15 July 2010
Location	Castletown, Isle of Man
Course	Road Course; 4.25 mi (6.84 km)

2010 Southern 100 Races were held between Monday 12 July and Thursday 15 July on the 4.25-mile Billown Circuit near Castletown, Isle of Man.

The main event was won by Ryan Farquhar claiming victory in the 2010 Southern 100 Solo Championship race, held over 2 legs after Michael Dunlop crashed at Iron Gate on lap 5. The 2010 Southern 100 Races consisted of twelve races including four combined races with Ryan Farquhar, Michael Dunlop and William Dunlop taking the most wins with three victories each. The two 400cc races were won by Roy Richardson and Alastair Howarth respectively, with Chris Palmer winning the second of the 125cc combined races. In the other combined classes, the inaugural 650cc twin-cylinder race was won by Ryan Farquhar and a 600cc class win for Wayne Hamilton in the combined 1000cc/600cc race. The 600cc support race produced a first time winner for local Isle of Man competitor Paul Smyth and other first time winners included Klaus Klaffenböck/Dan Sayle winning both Sidecar Races and William Cowden in the Senior Support Race.

== Results ==
=== Race 1; 2010 Senior Race final standings ===
Tuesday 13 July 2010 5 laps – 21.25 miles Billown Circuit (Reduced Race Distance)

Rank	Rider	Team	Time	Speed
1	(Northern Ireland) Michael Dunlop	Honda 1000cc	12:40.314	100.616 mph
2	(Wales) Ian Lougher	Kawasaki 1000cc	+ 4.258	100.056 mph
3	(Northern Ireland) Ryan Farquhar	Kawasaki 1000cc	+ 30.895	96.687 mph
4	(Scotland) Mark Buckley	Kawasaki 1000cc	+ 41.533	95.405 mph
5	(England) James McBride	Yamaha 1000cc	+ 42.224	95.323 mph
6	(Australia) Cameron Donald	Suzuki 1000cc	+ 46.742	94.789 mph
7	(Northern Ireland) Victor Gilmore	Suzuki 1000cc	+ 52.593	94.107 mph
8	(Northern Ireland) Paul Cranston	Honda 1000cc	+ 1:10.078	91.137 mph
9	(Isle of Man) Tim Venables	Honda 998cc	+ 1:24.102	90.5955 mph
10	(England) Russ Mountford	Honda 1000cc	+ 1:24.424	90.561 mph

Fastest Lap : Ian Lougher, 2' 30.098 101.933 mph on lap 5

=== Race 10; 2010 Southern 100 Races Solo Championship final standings ===
Thursday 15 July 2010 8 laps – 34.00 miles Billown Circuit (Reduced Race Distance held over 2 parts)

Rank	Rider	Team	Time	Speed
1	(Northern Ireland) Ryan Farquhar	Kawasaki 1000cc	18:48.141	108.497 mph
2	(Australia) Cameron Donald	Suzuki 1000cc	+ 13.694	107.196 mph
3	(England) James McBride	Yamaha 1000cc	+ 28.929	105.784 mph
4	(England) Scott Wilson	Suzuki 1000cc	+ 55.064	103.449 mph
5	(Northern Ireland) Victor Gilmore	Suzuki 1000cc	+ 1:06.586	102.450 mph
6	(England) Roy Richardson	Honda 600cc	+ 1:27.220	100.710 mph
7	(England) Russ Mountford	Honda 1000cc	+ 1:37.070	99.901 mph
8	(Northern Ireland) Wayne Hamilton	Yamaha 600cc	+ 1:42.858	99.431 mph
9	(Isle of Man) Dave Madsen-Mygdal	Yamaha 1000cc	+ 1:59.626	98.095 mph
10	(Isle of Man) Dave Primrose-Smith	Suzuki 1000cc	+ 2:14.419	96.949 mph

Fastest Lap : Ryan Farquhar, 2' 18.112 110.780 mph on lap 2
