= 2024 Isle of Man TT =

Annual motorcycle racing event

2024 Isle of Man TT Races
- Isle of Man TT Mountain Course layout

Race details
- Date: 27 May – 8 June 2024
- Location: Douglas, Isle of Man
- Course: Isle of Man TT Mountain Course; 37.733 mi (60.725 km)

The 2024 Isle of Man TT was held between 27 May and 8 June on the Isle of Man TT Mountain Course.

This year saw Michael Dunlop surpass his uncle Joey Dunlop as the most successful TT rider, with 29 TT wins.

== Schedule ==
Qualifying Week	Race Week				
Mon 27 May – Fri 31 May	1 June	2 June	5 June	6 June	8 June
All categories	Supersport TT Race 1	Superbike TT Race	Supertwin TT Race 1	Sidecar TT Race 2	Supersport TT Race 2
All categories	Sidecar TT Race 1	Superbike TT Race	Supertwin TT Race 1	Superstock TT Race 1	Senior TT Race
All categories	Sidecar TT Race 1	Superbike TT Race	Supertwin TT Race 1	Superstock TT Race 1	Supertwin TT Race 2

== Results ==
=== Monster Energy Supersport TT Race 1 ===
Results (1–10)
Position	Number	Rider	Machine	Time	Speed (mph)
1	6	(Northern Ireland) Michael Dunlop	Yamaha	01:11:19.297	126.963
2	8	(England) Davey Todd	Ducati	01:11:27.871	126.709
3	3	(England) Dean Harrison	Honda	01:11:50.252	126.051
4	5	(England) James Hillier	Kawasaki	01:12:31.694	124.851
5	19	(England) James Hind	Suzuki	01:12:33.140	124.809
6	7	(Australia) Josh Brookes	Yamaha	01:12:45.855	124.446
7	1	(Northern Ireland) Paul Jordan	Honda	01:12:48.035	124.384
8	14	(Republic of Ireland) Mike Browne	Yamaha	01:12:49.556	124.340
9	10	(England) Peter Hickman	Triumph	01:12:52.580	124.254
10	20	(Isle of Man) Michael Evans	Triumph	01:13:01.257	124.008

Results (11-41)
Position	Number	Rider	Machine	Time	Speed (mph)
11	16	(England) Dominic Herbertson	Yamaha	01:13:05.018	123.902
12	12	(Australia) David Johnson	Triumph	01:13:29.108	123.225
13	18	(Northern Ireland) Shaun Anderson	Suzuki	01:13:46.573	122.739
14	15	(England) Rob Hodson	Yamaha	01:14:16.940	121.902
15	4	(England) Ian Hutchinson	Honda	01:14:28.231	121.594
16					
17					
18					
19					
20					

=== 3wheeling.media Sidecar TT Race 1 ===
Results (1-10)
Position	Number	Rider	Machine	Time	Speed (mph)
1	3	(Isle of Man) Ryan Crowe / (Isle of Man) Callum Crowe	Honda LCR	57:14.976	118.628
2	2	(England) Peter Founds / Jevan Walmsley	Honda DDM	57:41.871	117.706
3	10	(England) Alan Founds / Rhys Gibbons	Yamaha LCR	58:56.251	115.231
4	9	Lewis Blackstock / Patrick Rosney	Yamaha LCR	59:05.252	114.938
5	8	Lee Crawford / Scott Hardie	Kawasaki LCR	59:05.788	114.921
6	4	(England) Tim Reeves / Mark Wilkes	Honda LCR	59:13.527	114.670
7	11	(England) Todd Ellis / (France) Emmanuelle Clement	Yamaha CES	59:51.987	113.443
8	6	(England) John Holden / Frank Claeys	Suzuki Christie	01:00:51.952	111.580
9	18	John Saunders / James Saunders	Yamaha LCR	01:02:22.690	108.875
10	14	Conrad Harrison / Ashley Moore	Yamaha Ireson	01:02:54.487	107.957

Results (11-19)
Position	Number	Rider	Machine	Time	Speed (mph)
11					
12					
13					
14					
15					
16					
17					
18					
19					

=== RST Superbike TT ===
Results (1–10)
Position	Number	Rider	Machine	Time	Speed (mph)
1	10	(England) Peter Hickman	BMW M1000RR K66	01:42:56.114	131.955
2	8	(England) Davey Todd	BMW M1000RR K66	01:43:01.954	131.830
3	3	(England) Dean Harrison	Honda CBR1000RR SP SC77	01:43:07.156	131.719
4	6	(Northern Ireland) Michael Dunlop	Honda CBR1000RR-R Fireblade SC82	01:43:22.273	131.398
5	5	(England) James Hillier	Honda CBR1000RR SP SC77	01:44:55.042	129.462
6	1	(England) John McGuinness	Honda CBR1000RR SP SC77	01:44:57.929	129.403
7	2	(England) Jamie Coward	Honda CBR1000RR SP SC77	01:44:58.162	129.398
8	20	(Republic of Ireland) Mike Browne	Aprilia - T Bike RSV4 1100	01:47:02.601	126.891
9	14	(England) Michael Rutter	BMW M1000RR K66	01:48:28.596	125.214
10	23	(Republic of Ireland) Brian McCormack	BMW M1000RR K66	01:48:43.644	124.925

Results (11-35)
Position	Number	Rider	Machine	Time	Speed (mph)
11					
12					
13					
14					
15					
16					
17					
18					
19					
20					
21					
22					
23					
24					
25					
26					
27					
28					
29					
30					
31					
32					
33					
34					
35					

=== RL360 Superstock TT Race 1 ===
Results (1-10)
Position	Number	Rider	Machine	Time	Speed (mph)
1	8	(England) Davey Todd	BMW	51:10.728	132.699
2	10	(England) Peter Hickman	BMW	51:12.936	132.604
3	6	(Northern Ireland) Michael Dunlop	Honda	51:30.676	131.843
4	3	(England) Dean Harrison	Honda	51:34.286	131.689
5	5	(England) James Hillier	Honda	52:06.877	130.317
6	2	(England) Jamie Coward	Honda	52:11.465	130.126
7	1	(England) John McGuinness	Honda	52:27.216	129.474
8	11	(Isle of Man) Conor Cummins	Honda	52:32.691	129.250
9	16	(England) Dominic Herbertson	BMW	52:52.383	128.447
10	20	(Republic of Ireland) Mike Browne	Aprilia	53:03.236	128.009

Results (11-38)
Position	Number	Rider	Machine	Time	Speed (mph)
11					
12					
13					
14					
15					
16					
17					
18					
19					
20					
21					
22					
23					
24					
25					
26					
27					
28					
29					
30					
31					
32					
33					
34					
35					
36					
37					
38					

=== Metzeler Supertwin TT Race 1 ===
Results (1–10)
Position	Number	Rider	Machine	Time	Speed (mph)
1	6	(Northern Ireland) Michael Dunlop	Paton	56:15.993	120.700
2	10	(England) Peter Hickman	Yamaha	56:36.400	119.975
3	9	(England) Dominic Herbertson	Paton	56:50.794	119.469
4	2	(England) Jamie Coward	Kawasaki	56:56.289	119.277
5	14	(Republic of Ireland) Mike Browne	Aprilia	57:20.383	118.441
6	8	(England) Davey Todd	Kawasaki	58:00.925	117.062
7	4	(England) Michael Rutter	Yamaha	58:17.201	116.517
8	16	(Isle of Man) Joe Yeardsley	Paton	58:44.075	115.629
9	30	(South Africa) Allann Venter	Kawasaki	59:18.944	114.496
10	3	(France) Pierre Yves Bian	Paton	59:24.230	114.326

Results (11-28)
Position	Number	Rider	Machine	Time	Speed (mph)
11					
12					
13					
14					
15					
16					
17					
18					
19					
20					
21					
22					
23					
24					
25					
26					
27					
28					

=== 3wheeling.media Sidecar TT Race 2 ===
Results (1-10)
Position	Number	Rider	Machine	Time	Speed (mph)
1	3	(Isle of Man) Ryan Crowe / (Isle of Man) Callum Crowe	Honda	37:49.274	119.711
2	1	(England) Ben Birchall / Kevin Rousseau	Honda	38:09.766	118.639
3	5	(Isle of Man) Dave Molyneux / Jake Roberts	Kawasaki	39:22.931	114.966
4	10	(England) Alan Founds / Rhys Gibbons	Yamaha	39:29.810	114.632
5	9	Lewis Blackstock / Patrick Rosney	Yamaha	39:34.557	114.403
6	7	Steve Ramsden / Mathew Ramsden	Honda	40:54.688	110.668
7	18	John Saunders / James Saunders	Yamaha	41:13.228	109.839
8	16	Wayne Lockey / Matthew Rostron	Honda	41:17.148	109.665
9	30	Robert Dawson / Matthew Sims	Honda	41:27.824	109.665
10	14	Conrad Harrison / Ashley Moore	Yamaha	41:43.819	108.497

Results (11-16)
Position	Number	Rider	Machine	Time	Speed (mph)
11					

=== Monster Energy Supersport TT Race 2 ===
Results (1-10)
Position	Number	Rider	Machine	Time	Speed (mph)
1	6	(Northern Ireland) Michael Dunlop	Yamaha	35:18.593	128.225
2	3	(England) Dean Harrison	Honda	35:22.482	127.990
3	8	(England) Davey Todd	Ducati	35:24.825	127.849
4	2	(England) Jamie Coward	Triumph	35:33.148	127.350
5	10	(England) Peter Hickman	Triumph	35:35.377	127.217
6	5	(England) James Hillier	Kawasaki	35:41.317	126.864
7	14	(Republic of Ireland) Mike Browne	Yamaha	35:51.040	126.291
8	1	(Northern Ireland) Paul Jordan	Honda	36:11.129	125.122
9	20	(Isle of Man) Michael Evans	Triumph	36:32.064	123.927
10	7	(Australia) Joshua Brookes	Yamaha	36:32.769	123.887

Results (11-38)
Position	Number	Rider	Machine	Time	Speed (mph)
11					

=== RL360 Superstock TT Race 2 ===
Race not held.

=== Entire Cover Insurance Supertwin TT Race 2 ===
Results (1-10)
Position	Number	Rider	Machine	Time	Speed (mph)
1	6	(Northern Ireland) Michael Dunlop	Paton	18:29.246	122.451
2	10	(England) Peter Hickman	Yamaha	18:35.692	121.743
3	14	(Republic of Ireland) Mike Browne	Aprilia	18:43.681	120.878
4	9	(England) Dominic Herbertson	Paton	18:47.030	120.518
5	1	(Northern Ireland) Paul Jordan	Yamaha	18:56.382	119.527
6	8	(England) Davey Todd	Kawasaki	18:57.980	119.359
7	5	(England) Rob Hodson	Paton	18:58.330	119.322
8	7	(Australia) Joshua Brookes	Yamaha	19:05.450	118.581
9	28	(Northern Ireland) Adam McLean	Yamaha	19:05.949	118.529
10	18	(England) Baz Furber	Yamaha	19:06.544	118.467

Results (11-23)
Position	Number	Rider	Machine	Time	Speed (mph)
11					

=== Milwaukee Senior TT ===
Results (1–10)
Position	Number	Rider	Machine	Time	Speed (mph)
1	8	(England) Davey Todd	BMW	01:08:09.761	132.847
2	7	(Australia) Joshua Brookes	BMW	01:08:48.846	131.589
3	3	(England) Dean Harrison	Honda	01:09:15.057	130.759
4	5	(England) James Hillier	Honda	01:09:52.433	129.593
5	1	(England) John McGuinness	Honda	01:10:19.913	128.750
6	20	(Republic of Ireland) Mike Browne	Aprilia	01:10:27.078	128.531
7	25	(Isle of Man) Nathan Harrison	Honda	01:11:17.499	127.016
8	18	(Northern Ireland) Shaun Anderson	Suzuki	01:11:17.903	127.004
9	14	(England) Michael Rutter	BMW	01:11:28.426	126.693
10	24	(Northern Ireland) Paul Jordan	Honda	01:11:31.658	126.597

Results (11-31)
Position	Number	Rider	Machine	Time	Speed (mph)
11					

== Wins table ==
Rider	Wins
(Northern Ireland) Michael Dunlop	4
(Isle of Man) Ryan Crowe and Callum Crowe	2
(England) Davey Todd	2
(England) Peter Hickman	1

== Bibliography ==
- "Island Racer 2024: Your Guide to the 2024 Isle of Man TT". Island Racer. Mortons Media Group. 2024. SKU 6019561 – via Kelsey Publishing.
