= Davey Todd =

English motorcycle road racer

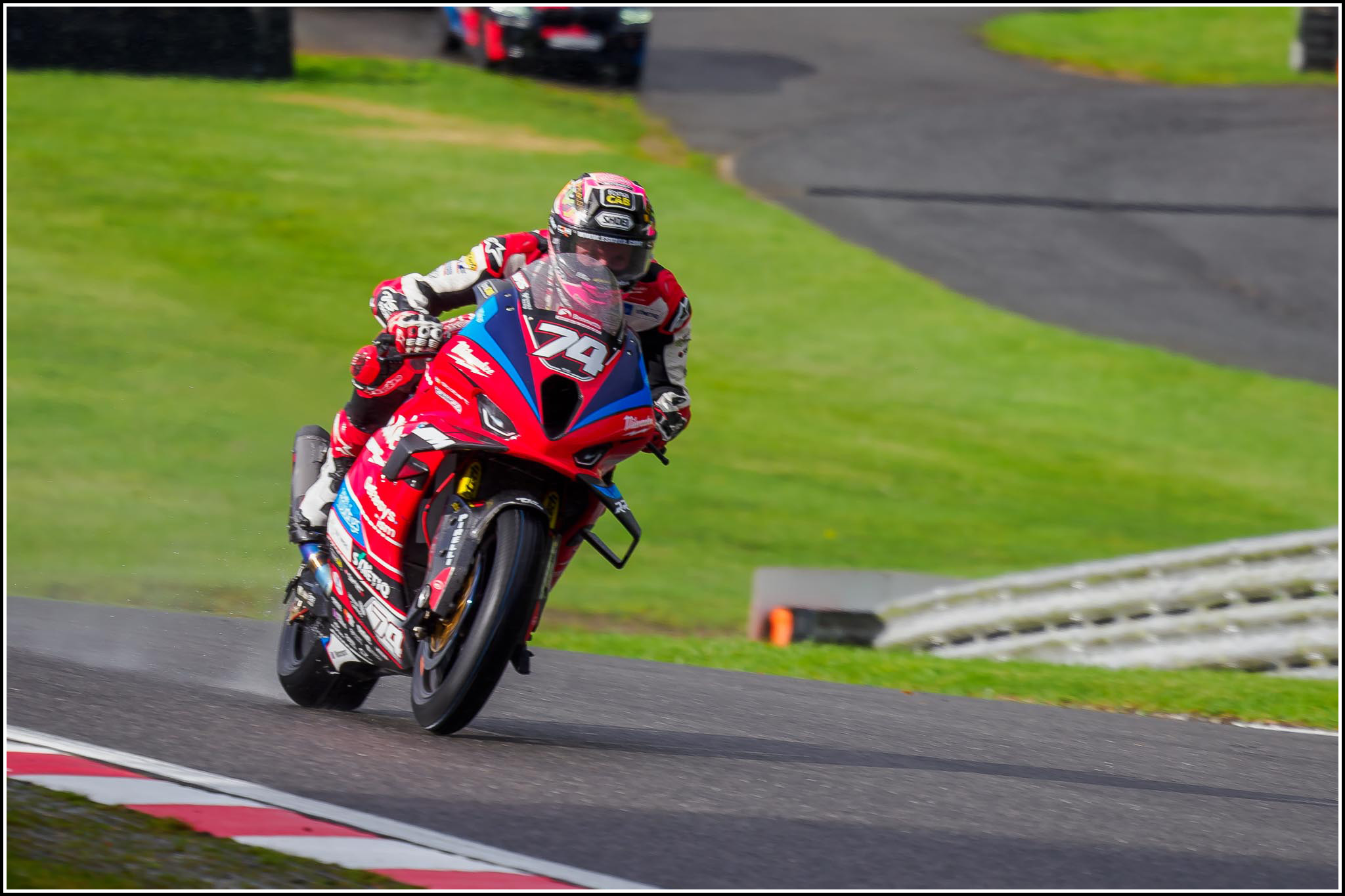
- Todd taking part in British Superbike Q1 2023
- Nationality: English
- Born: David John Todd; 14 September 1995 (age 31); Saltburn by Sea, North Yorkshire, England
- Current team: 8TEN Racing
- Bike number: 7 (BSB) 8 (Roads)
Motorcycle racing career statistics
Isle of Man TT career
TTs contested	6 (2018-2025)
TT wins	3
First TT win	2024 Superstock TT Race 1
Last TT win	2025 Superbike TT Race
TT podiums	11

David John 'Davey' Todd (born 14 September 1995) is an English professional motorcycle racer.

For 2024, Todd competed in the Superstock 1000 class of the British Superbike Championship on short circuits using a BMW M1000 RR and in on-road racing, also in the Supersport class with a Ducati 955.

Todd has won three Isle of Man TT races, and has achieved eight other podium finishes as of the 2025 TT.

== Career ==
=== 2016–2017: Early tarmac success ===
In 2016, Todd competed in the National Superstock 600cc Championship, finishing sixth overall with race wins at Oulton Park and Brands Hatch. This marked his transition from motocross and enduro racing to tarmac racing.

In 2017, Todd continued in the National Superstock 600cc Championship but transitioned to road racing mid-season. He made his debut at the Skerries 100 and the Ulster Grand Prix, where he achieved a podium finish in the Dundrod 150 National Race.

=== 2018: Breakthrough in road racing ===
Todd's Isle of Man TT debut in 2018 was remarkable, as he became the second-fastest newcomer in history with a lap speed of 128.379 mph. He earned the TT Newcomers Trophy, the TT Privateers Championship, and the RST Star of Tomorrow Award. Additionally, he achieved top-ten finishes across various classes at the North West 200, Ulster Grand Prix, and Southern 100, setting records as a standout newcomer.

=== 2019: Dominance in international road racing ===
In 2019, Todd won the International Road Racing Championship with dominant victories at Chimay and Frohburg. He claimed his first International road race victory in the North West 200 Supersport class.

At the Isle of Man TT, Todd improved his performance, achieving a sixth-place finish in the Senior TT with a lap speed of 131.491 mph. He also recorded top-ten finishes in multiple categories.

=== 2020–2022: Consistent progress ===
Although the COVID-19 pandemic disrupted the racing calendar, Todd competed in various road races during this period. His steady progress in Superbike and Supersport categories further solidified his reputation.

Ultimately, Todd topped the Duke Road Racing Rankings in 2022 and with that won the Championship and Geoff Duke Trophy that season.

=== 2023: Podium finishes at major events ===
In 2023, Todd achieved multiple podium finishes at the Isle of Man TT, including a third-place finish in the Superstock race. His consistent performances established him as a top contender in road racing.

=== 2024: Career-defining wins ===
The year 2024 marked significant achievements for Todd, as he claimed his first Senior TT win, one of the most prestigious accolades in motorcycle road racing. He also won the RL360 Superstock Race, earning the Joey Dunlop Trophy as the best combined Superbike/Senior TT rider.

=== 2025 Isle of Man TT ===
Todd, riding for 8TEN Racing BMW in Superbike and Superstock, and Padgett’s Racing in Supersport/Supertwin, showcased a stellar performance at the 2025 Isle of Man TT. • Superbike TT: Winner, leading every lap in a narrow victory over Michael Dunlop.

• Superstock TT Race 1 & 2: 2nd place finishes behind Honda’s Dean Harrison.

• Supertwin TT Race 2: Finished 2nd behind Michael Dunlop.

• Senior TT: Race cancelled due to adverse weather, with Todd expressing disappointment at losing a final chance.

This marked his third overall TT win, reinforcing his status among the event’s elite.

== Isle of Man TT career ==
Todd made his Isle of Man TT debut in 2018. In his first year, he quickly established himself as a strong competitor, becoming the second-fastest newcomer in TT history with an average lap speed of 128.379 mph. That year, he achieved a tenth place finish in the Superstock TT, averaging 126.047 mph, and secured top-12 finishes in both the Supersport TT and Senior TT races.

In 2019, Todd continued to build on his performances, achieving a sixth-place finish in the Senior TT with an average lap speed of 131.491 mph. He also secured top-10 finishes in the Superbike, Supersport, and Superstock races, showing consistent improvement. Additionally, Todd competed in the Supertwin TT but retired his Norton motorcycle at the pits. He also took part in the SES TT Zero electric race as a replacement rider for the University of Nottingham team, stepping in after the death of Daley Mathison, and was recorded in third position at Glen Helen during the race.

In the 2025 Superbike TT, Todd secured his first victory in the category. Riding for his own 8TEN Racing team, co-owned by multiple-time TT winner Peter Hickman, he maintained a consistent pace throughout the race, holding off Michael Dunlop, who finished just 1.296 seconds behind.

== Career statistics ==
=== Full TT results ===
2025	**Superbike TT**; 1	**Supersport TT 1**; 4	**Superstock TT 1**; 2	**Supertwin TT 1**; 4	**Supersport TT 2**; 3	**Superstock TT 2**; 2	**Supertwin TT 2**; 2	**Senior TT** cancelled
2024	**Superbike TT**; 2	**Supersport TT 1**; 2	**Supertwin TT 1**; 6	**Superstock TT 1**; 1	**Supersport TT 2**; 3	**Senior TT**; 1		
2023	**Superbike TT**; DNF	**Superstock TT 1**; 4	**Supersport TT 1**; 5	**Supersport TT 2**; 4	**Senior TT**; 9	**Superstock TT 2** DNF		
2022	**Superbike TT**; DNF	**Supersport TT 1**; 8	**Superstock TT**; 3	**Supersport TT 2**; 4	**Senior TT**; 4			
2019	**Superbike TT**; 10	**Supersport TT 1**; 9	**Superstock TT**; 8	**Senior TT**; 6	**Lightweight TT**; DNF	**Zero TT**; DNF		
2018	**Superbike TT**; 16	**Supersport TT 1**; 12	**Supersport TT 2**; 12	**Superstock TT**; 10	**Senior TT**; 9			

=== British Superbike Championship ===
Year	Bike	1			2			3			4			5			6			7			8			9			10			11			Pos	Pts
Year	Bike	R1	R2	R3	R1	R2	R3	R1	R2	R3	R1	R2	R3	R1	R2	R3	R1	R2	R3	R1	R2	R3	R1	R2	R3	R1	R2	R3	R1	R2	R3	R1	R2	R3	Pos	Pts
2022	Honda	SIL	SIL	SIL	OUL	OUL	OUL	DON	DON	DON	KNO	KNO	KNO	BRH	BRH	BRH	THR	THR	THR	CAD	CAD	CAD	SNE	SNE	SNE	OUL	OUL	OUL	DON	DON	DON	BRH; 15	BRH; 15	BRH; Ret	28th	2
2023	Honda & BMW	SIL; 22	SIL; 16	SIL; 22	OUL; 24	OUL; 15	OUL; 15	DON; 20	DON; DNS	DON; DNS	KNO	KNO	KNO	SNE	SNE	SNE	BRH	BRH	BRH	THR	THR	THR	CAD	CAD	CAD	OUL; 12	OUL; 16	OUL; 15	DON; 18	DON; 14	DON; 10	BRH; 19	BRH; Ret	BRH; 16	24th	15
2025	BMW	OUL; Ret	OUL; 21	OUL; C	DON; Ret	DON; 18	DON; DNS	SNE; Ret	SNE; 16	SNE; 19	KNO; 19	KNO; 24	KNO; 18	BRH; 18	BRH; 17	BRH; 15	THR	THR	THR	CAD	CAD	CAD	DON	DON	DON	ASS	ASS	ASS	OUL	OUL	OUL	BRH	BRH	BRH	22nd*	1*

^{*} Season still in progress.

=== British Supersport Championship ===
(key) (Races in bold indicate pole position; races in italics indicate fastest lap)

Year	Bike	1	2	3	4	5	6	7	8	9	10	11	12	13	14	15	16	17	18	19	20	21	22	Pos	Pts
2023	Yamaha	SLV	SLV	OPK	OPK	DPK	DPK	KNH	KNH	STN	STN	BRH; Ret	BRH; 16	TXN	TXN	CPK	CPK	OPK	OPK	DPK	DPK	BRH	BRH	44th	2

=== Suzuka 8 Hours results ===
Year	Team	Riders	Bike	Pos
2025	(Japan) AutoRace Ube Racing Team BMW	(Japan) Naomichi Uramoto (France) Loris Baz (United Kingdom) Davey Todd	BMW S1000RR	6th
