= 2023 Isle of Man TT =

Motorcycle sport event

2023 Isle of Man TT Races
- Isle of Man TT Mountain Course layout

Race details
- Date: 29 May – 10 June 2023
- Location: Douglas, Isle of Man
- Course: Isle of Man TT Mountain Course; 37.733 mi (60.725 km)

The 2023 Isle of Man TT was held between Monday 29 May and Saturday 10 June, on the Isle of Man TT Mountain Course.

The event was marked by the high profile absences of possible podium contenders Lee Johnston and Nathan Harrison due to injury, multiple TT winner Ian Hutchinson due to a stroke, Gary Johnson, the 2 time winner crashed badly in Horice, Czech Republic meaning he was sidelined for the 2023 season and fastest ever newcomer Glenn Irwin for personal reasons.

This year saw the outright lap record broken again by Peter Hickman achieving 136.358 mph (219.447 km/h) on Friday 9th June during the second RL360 Superstock race aboard the Monster Energy by FHO Racing BMW M1000RR.

Michael Dunlop saw success during the event by earning 4 victories (Superbike, Supersport 1, Supersport 2, Lightweight 1) putting him at 25 total, one below his uncle Joey Dunlop. He also set a new supersport record of 130.403 mph (209.863 km/h), Peter Hickman also manage to break the 130 mph (210 km/h) average on a supersport with 130.219 mph (209.567 km/h).

The Birchall brothers, Ben and Tom, saw continued success by winning both Sidecar races taking their tally to 14 and 11 in a row. They also set a new lap record of 120.645 mph (194.159 km/h) during the second Sidecar race.

One competitor died on the final lap of the first Supertwin TT, Spanish rider Raul Torras Martinez.

== Schedule ==
Qualifying Week	Race Week					
Mon 29 May – Fri 2 June	Sat 3 June	Sun 4 June	Tue 6 June	Wed 7 June	Fri 9 June	Sat 10 June
All categories		Superbike TT				Senior TT
All categories			Superstock TT Race 1		Superstock TT Race 2	
All categories	Supersport TT Race 1			Supersport TT Race 2		
All categories			Supertwin TT Race 1		Supertwin TT Race 2	
All categories	Sidecar TT Race 1			Sidecar TT Race 2		

== Results ==
=== Monster Energy Supersport TT Race 1 ===
Results (1–10)
Position	Number	Rider	Machine	Time	Speed (mph)
1	6	(Northern Ireland) Michael Dunlop	Yamaha	01:11:22.090	126.880
2	10	(England) Peter Hickman	Triumph	01:11:34.420	126.516
3	2	(England) Dean Harrison	Yamaha	01:11:34.814	126.504
4	4	(England) Jamie Coward	Yamaha	01:12:16.092	125.300
5	8	(England) Davey Todd	Honda	01:12:18.928	125.218
6	5	(England) James Hillier	Yamaha	01:12:54.727	124.193
7	3	(Northern Ireland) Paul Jordan	Yamaha	01:13:15.214	123.614
8	1	(Australia) David Johnson	Honda	01:13:40.595	122.905
9	15	(England) Rob Hodson	Yamaha	01:13:44.052	122.809
10	14	(England) James Hind	Yamaha	01:13:54.822	122.510

Results (11-41)
Position	Number	Rider	Machine	Time	Speed (mph)
11	20	Craig Neve	Triumph	01:13:56.081	122.476
12	19	Michael Evans	Honda	01:14:35.739	121.390
13	18	Shaun Anderson	Honda	01:14:45.497	121.126
14	26	Michal Dokoupil	Yamaha	01:16:00.303	119.139
15	21	Brian McCormack	Triumph	01:16:02.326	119.087
16	31	Joey Thompson	Yamaha	01:16:08.268	118.932
17	34	Baz Furber	Kawasaki	01:16:10.705	118.868
18	24	Pierre Yves Bian	Triumph	01:16:19.236	118.647
19	36	Stefano Bonetti	Yamaha	01:16:25.734	118.479
20	47	Richard Wilson	Honda	01:16:38.182	118.158
21	61	Jonathan Goetschy	Yamaha	01:16:44.304	118.001
22	63	Ryan Cringle	Triumph	01:16:45.144	117.979
23	49	James Chawke	Kawasaki	01:16:46.054	117.956
24	42	Tom Weeden	Yamaha	01:16:51.311	117.822
25	27	Julian Trummer	Yamaha	01:16:56.032	117.701
26	45	Michael Russell	Kawasaki	01:17:08.675	117.380
27	29	Stephen Parsons	Kawasaki	01:17:21.096	117.065
28	48	Jonathan Perry	Honda	01:17:24.833	116.971
29	53	Mark Parrett	Yamaha	01:17:34.093	116.739
30	46	Forest Dunn	Yamaha	01:17:37.643	116.650
31	43	Allann Venter	Honda	01:17:41.921	116.543
32	35	Amalric Blanc	Kawasaki	01:17:58.816	116.122
33	38	Mark Goodings	Yamaha	01:18:51.515	114.828
34	41	Martin Morris	Kawasaki	01:18:51.993	114.817
35	32	Xavier Denis	Kawasaki	01:18:55.169	114.740
36	50	Paul Potchy Williams	Suzuki	01:18:55.710	114.727
37	64	Jorge Halliday	Yamaha	01:18:57.681	114.679
38	56	Paul Cassidy	Yamaha	01:19:36.975	113.736
39	65	Jack Petrie	Yamaha	01:20:07.707	113.009
40	57	David Brook	Yamaha	01:20:20.057	112.719
41	59	Masayuki Yamanaka	Honda	01:20:22.400	112.664

=== 3wheeling.media Sidecar TT Race 1 ===
Results (1-10)
Position	Number	Rider	Machine	Time	Speed (mph)
1	1	(England) Ben Birchall / (England) Tom Birchall	Honda LCR	56:53.768	119.365
2	2	(England) Peter Founds / Jevan Walmsley	Honda LCR	57:17.835	118.529
3	6	(England) John Holden / (France) Maxime Vasseur	Yamaha LCR	01:00:33.236	112.155
4	16	Steve Ramsden / Mathew Ramsden	Honda LCR	01:00:36.787	112.045
5	8	(England) Gary Bryan / Philip Hyde	Honda Baker	01:00:52.000	111.548
6	31	(England) Daryl Gibson / (England) Tom Christie	Suzuki CES	01:00:55.431	111.474
7	18	Wayne Lockey / Matthew Rostron	Honda LCR	01:01:57.922	109.600
8	15	(England) Greg Lambert / (England) Andrew Haynes	Honda LCR	01:02:17.193	109.035
9	17	John Saunders / James Saunders	Honda Shelbourne	01:02:45.035	108.228
10	7	(England) Alan Founds / Colin Smyth	Yamaha LCR	01:02:57.404	107.874

Results (11-19)
Position	Number	Rider	Machine	Time	Speed (mph)
11	14	Dan Knight / Ben Hughes	Honda LCR	01:03:03.566	107.698
12	12	Darren Hope / Lenny Bumfrey	Honda LCR	01:04:24.626	105.439
13	34	Mike Jackson / Jake Roberts*	Suzuki DMR	01:04:43.954	104.915
14	25	Shaun Chandler / Ben Chandler	Honda CES	01:04:55.222	104.611
15	27	Alun Thomas / Kenny Cole	Honda Ireson	01:05:39.663	103.431
16	24	Michael Russell / Vicky Cooke	Suzuki LCR	01:05:45.251	103.285
17	19	Craig Melvin / Stuart Christian	Suzuki LCR	01:05:48.776	103.192
18	23	Bruce Moore / Mark Gash	Honda Ireson	01:06:14.660	102.520
19	33	Derek Lynch* / Anthony McDonnell*	Suzuki DMR	01:07:58.353	99.914

=== RST Superbike TT ===
Results (1–10)
Position	Number	Rider	Machine	Time	Speed (mph)
1	6	(Northern Ireland) Michael Dunlop	Honda	01:43:01.855	131.832
2	10	(England) Peter Hickman	BMW	01:43:10.088	131.657
3	2	(England) Dean Harrison	Kawasaki	01:43:19.894	131.449
4	5	(England) James Hillier	Yamaha	01:45:20.238	128.946
5	4	(England) Jamie Coward	Honda	01:45:30.679	128.733
6	3	(England) John McGuinness	Honda	01:46:03.601	128.067
7	7	(Australia) Joshua Brookes	BMW	01:46:17.044	127.797
8	13	(England) Dominic Herbertson	BMW	01:47:15.700	126.632
9	12	(England) Michael Rutter	Honda	01:47:22.830	126.492
10	18	(Northern Ireland) Shaun Anderson	Suzuki	01:47:43.554	126.087

Results (11-35)
Position	Number	Rider	Machine	Time	Speed (mph)
11	1	David Johnson	Honda	01:48:12.256	125.529
12	28	James Hind	Suzuki	01:48:20.190	125.376
13	14	Phillip Crowe	BMW	01:48:25.946	125.265
14	21	Brian McCormack	BMW	01:48:30.605	125.175
15	16	Mike Browne	BMW	01:49:15.882	124.311
16	24	Paul Jordan	Yamaha	01:50:01.002	123.461
17	19	Samuel West	BMW	01:50:06.931	123.350
18	27	Julian Trummer	Honda	01:50:22.857	123.054
19	25	Michael Evans	Suzuku	01:50:32.283	122.879
20	32	Stephen Smith	Honda	01:51:29.997	121.819
21	35	Mark Parrett	BMW	01:51:43.442	121.575
22	36	Stefano Bonetti	Honda	01:51:43.779	121.568
23	47	Richard Wilson	Honda	01:52:01.391	121.250
24	46	Forest Dunn	Suzuki	01:52:21.636	120.886
25	45	Michael Russell	BMW	01:52:22.002	120.879
26	37	Raul Torras Martinez	Honda	01:52:38.826	120.578
27	43	Allann Venter	BMW	01:52:46.872	120.435
28	38	Mark Goodings	Kawasaki	01:52:57.315	120.249
29	53	Rhys Hardisty	Yamaha	01:53:00.786	120.188
30	49	James Chawke	Suzuki	01:53:30.794	119.658
31	34	Baz Furber	BMW	01:54:31.372	118.603
32	39	Dave Hewson	BMW	01:54:41.233	118.433
33	41	Chris Sarbora	BMW	01:55:07.672	117.980
34	52	Xavier Denis	Yamaha	01:37:09.427	116.502
35	61	Erno Kostamo*	BMW	01:37:39.247	115.909

=== RL360 Superstock TT Race 1 ===
Results (1-10)
Position	Number	Rider	Machine	Time	Speed (mph)
1	10	(England) Peter Hickman	BMW	51:05.245	132.937
2	6	(Northern Ireland) Michael Dunlop	Honda	51:28.417	131.939
3	2	(England) Dean Harrison	Kawasaki	51:43.244	131.309
4	8	(England) Davey Todd	Honda	52:06.251	130.343
5	5	(England) James Hillier	Yamaha	52:14.822	129.986
6	4	(England) Jamie Coward	Honda	52:16.168	129.931
7	11	(Isle of Man) Conor Cummins	Honda	52:37.564	129.050
8	1	(Australia) David Johnson	Honda	52:56.131	128.296
9	16	(Republic of Ireland) Mike Browne	BMW	53:35.344	126.731
10	18	(Northern Ireland) Shaun Anderson	Suzuki	53:38.580	126.604

Results (11-38)
Position	Number	Rider	Machine	Time	Speed (mph)
11	21	Brian McCormack	BMW	53:48.443	126.217
12	20	Craig Neve	Honda	53:49.243	126.186
13	12	Michael Rutter	BMW	53:58.364	125.830
14	28	James Hind	Suzuki	54:03.697	125.623
15	19	Samuel West	BMW	54:09.031	125.417
16	24	Paul Jordan	Yamaha	54:48.621	123.907
17	27	Julian Trummer	Honda	54:53.118	123.738
18	32	Stephen Smith	Honda	54:56.455	123.613
19	22	Rob Hodson	Honda	55:02.460	123.388
20	37	Raul Torras Martinez	Honda	55:09.613	123.121
21	47	Richard Wilson	Honda	55:32.978	122.258
22	38	Mark Goodings	Kawasaki	55:43.333	121.880
23	35	Mark Parrett	BMW	55:43.466	121.875
24	36	Stefano Bonetti	Honda	55:50.608	121.615
25	29	David Datzer	BMW	55:50.764	121.609
26	62	Ryan Cringle*	Honda	55:51.760	121.573
27	45	Michael Russell	BMW	55:53.638	121.505
28	46	Forest Dunn	Suzuki	55:58.254	121.338
29	13	Dominic Herbertson	BMW	56:01.125	121.234
30	25	Michael Evans	Suzuki	56:07.088	121.020
31	49	James Chawke	Suzuki	56:10.125	120.911
32	43	Allann Venter	BMW	56:28.871	120.242
33	53	Rhys Hardisty	Yamaha	56:33.222	120.088
34	57	Rennie Scaysbrook	BMW	56:34.670	120.036
35	39	Dave Hewson	BMW	56:54.130	119.352
36	55	Amalric Blanc	BMW	57:02.160	119.072
37	54	Anthony Redmond	BMW	57:07.266	118.895
38	52	Xavier Denis	Yamaha	57:45.319	117.589

=== Carole Nash Supertwin TT Race 1 ===
Results (1–10)
Position	Number	Rider	Machine	Time	Speed (mph)
1	6	(Northern Ireland) Michael Dunlop	Paton	56:21.475	120.505
2	16	(Republic of Ireland) Mike Browne	Paton	56:48.259	119.558
3	4	(England) Jamie Coward	Kawasaki	56:50.496	119.479
4	10	(England) Peter Hickman	Yamaha	57:16.541	118.574
5	7	(Australia) Joshua Brookes	Kawasaki	57:27.671	118.191
6	8	(France) Pierre Yves Bian	Paton	58:11.117	116.720
7	1	(England) Dominic Herbertson	Kawasaki	58:22.836	116.330
8	2	(England) Michael Rutter	Yamaha	58:56.233	115.231
9	24	(England) Baz Furber	Yamaha	59:16.454	114.576
10	5	(England) Rob Hodson	Kawasaki	59:33.657	114.024

Results (11-28)
Position	Number	Rider	Machine	Time	Speed (mph)
11	19	Michael Evans	Aprilia	59:49.030	113.536
12	13	Michal Dokoupil	Aprilia	59:58.748	113.229
13	45	Michael Russell	Aprilia	01:00:41.946	111.886
14	14	Chris Moore	Kawasaki	01:00:50.441	111.626
15	41	Martin Morris	Aprilia	01:00:53.996	111.517
16	30	Paul Potchy Williams	Kawasaki	01:00:56.614	111.438
17	39	Dave Hewson	Aprilia	01:01:02.491	111.259
18	25	Jonathan Goetschy	Aprilia	01:01:06.714	111.131
19	48	Miroslav Sloboda	Kawasaki	01:01:29.375	110.448
20	32	Paul Cassidy	Kawasaki	01:01:37.836	110.195
21	44	Pete Murray	Kawasaki	01:01:50.571	109.817
22	38	Gareth Arnold	Aprilia	01:02:14.705	109.107
23	40	Jamie Cringle	Kawasaki	01:02:51.691	108.037
24	53	Andy Hornby	Paton	01:03:07.631	107.583
25	42	Tom Weeden	Kawasaki	01:03:14.612	107.385
26	46	David Madsen-Mygdal	Kawasaki	01:03:31.855	106.899
27	47	Masayuki Yamanaka	Kawasaki	01:03:41.529	106.629
28	54	Jack Petrie*	Kawasaki	01:05:26.655	103.774

=== 3wheeling.media Sidecar TT Race 2 ===
Results (1-10)
Position	Number	Rider	Machine	Time	Speed (mph)
1	1	(England) Ben Birchall / (England) Tom Birchall	Honda LCR	56:41.816	119.784
2	2	(England) Peter Founds / Jevan Walmsley	Honda LCR	56:50.963	119.463
3	3	(Isle of Man) Ryan Crowe / (Isle of Man) Callum Crowe	Honda LCR	57:38.595	117.818
4	5	(England) Tim Reeves / Mark Wilkes	Yamaha LCR	59:14.913	114.626
5	16	Steve Ramsden / Mathew Ramsden	Honda LCR	59:53.875	113.383
6	8	(England) Gary Bryan / Philip Hyde	Honda Baker	01:00:24.856	112.414
7	6	(England) John Holden / (France) Maxime Vasseur	Yamaha LCR	01:01:17.827	110.795
8	15	(England) Greg Lambert / (England) Andrew Haynes	Honda LCR	01:01:47.897	109.896
9	18	Wayne Lockey / Matthew Rostron	Honda LCR	01:02:18.795	108.988
10	17	John Saunders / James Saunders	Honda Shelbourne	01:02:35.449	108.505

Results (11-16)
Position	Number	Rider	Machine	Time	Speed (mph)
11	7	Alan Founds / Colin Smyth	Yamaha LCR	01:03:03.710	107.694
12	25	Shaun Chandler / Ben Chandler	Honda CES	01:03:52.766	106.316
13	34	Mike Jackson / Jake Roberts*	Suzuki DMR	01:04:31.029	105.265
14	33	Derek Lynch* / Anthony McDonnell*	Suzuki DMR	01:04:54.706	104.625
15	21	Andy King / Andrew Sigsworth	Honda Ireson	01:05:45.932	103.267
16	23	Bruce Moore / Mark Gash	Honda Ireson	01:06:21.304	102.349

=== Monster Energy Supersport TT Race 2 ===
Results (1-10)
Position	Number	Rider	Machine	Time	Speed (mph)
1	6	(Northern Ireland) Michael Dunlop	Yamaha	01:10:50.234	127.831
2	10	(England) Peter Hickman	Triumph	01:10:59.852	127.542
3	2	(England) Dean Harrison	Yamaha	01:11:24.663	126.804
4	8	(England) Davey Todd	Honda	01:11:36.541	126.453
5	4	(England) James Hillier	Yamaha	01:11:58.165	125.820
6	14	(England) James Hind	Yamaha	01:13:12.612	123.688
7	3	(Northern Ireland) Paul Jordan	Yamaha	01:13:24.694	123.348
8	20	(England) Craig Neve	Triumph	01:13:34.426	123.076
9	1	(Australia) David Johnson	Honda	01:13:35.294	123.052
10	13	(England) Dominic Herbertson	Yamaha	01:13:36.735	123.012

Results (11-38)
Position	Number	Rider	Machine	Time	Speed (mph)
11	15	Rob Hodson	Yamaha	01:13:41.857	122.870
12	16	Mike Browne	Yamaha	01:14:06.803	122.180
13	18	Shaun Anderson	Honda	01:14:47.688	121.067
14	26	Michal Dokoupil	Yamaha	01:15:12.179	120.410
15	31	Joey Thompson	Yamaha	01:15:22.001	120.149
16	21	Brian McCormack	Triumph	01:15:44.451	119.555
17	34	Baz Furber	Kawasaki	01:16:00.693	119.129
18	63	Ryan Cringle*	Triumph	01:16:06.618	118.975
19	46	Forest Dunn	Yamaha	01:16:37.104	118.186
20	61	Jonathan Goetschy	Yamaha	01:16:38.449	118.151
21	47	Richard Wilson	Honda	01:16:39.544	118.123
22	49	James Chawke	Kawasaki	01:16:48.986	117.881
23	36	Stefano Bonetti	Yamaha	01:16:51.472	117.817
24	28	Timothee Monot	Yamaha	01:16:54.662	117.736
25	43	Allann Venter	Honda	01:16:58.400	117.641
26	51	Rhys Hardisty	Yamaha	01:17:00.525	117.587
27	42	Tom Weeden	Yamaha	01:17:03.085	117.522
28	32	Xavier Denis	Kawasaki	01:17:15.392	117.210
29	56	Paul Cassidy	Yamaha	01:17:40.841	116.570
30	52	Gary Vines	Honda	01:17:46.728	116.422
31	38	Mark Goodings	Yamaha	01:17:54.889	116.219
32	41	Martin Morris	Kawasaki	01:18:00.419	116.082
33	50	Paul Potchy Williams	Suzuki	01:18:28.440	115.391
34	64	Jorge Halliday*	Yamaha	01:18:45.119	114.984
35	65	Jack Petrie*	Yamaha	01:19:03.263	114.544
36	59	Masayuki Yamanaka	Honda	01:20:03.193	113.115
37	57	David Brook	Yamaha	01:20:04.766	113.078
38	62	Craig Szczypek	Kawasaki	01:20:14.082	112.859

=== RL360 Superstock TT Race 2 ===
Results (1-10)
Position	Number	Rider	Machine	Time	Speed (mph)
1	10	(England) Peter Hickman	BMW	50:48.301	133.676
2	6	(Northern Ireland) Michael Dunlop	Honda	51:05.486	132.926
3	2	(England) Dean Harrison	Kawasaki	51:46.322	131.179
4	11	(Isle of Man) Conor Cummins	Honda	52:04.622	130.411
5	7	(Australia) Joshua Brookes	BMW	52:28.364	129.427
6	4	(England) Jamie Coward	Honda	52:28.855	129.407
7	5	(England) James Hillier	Yamaha	52:45.931	128.709
8	3	(England) John McGuinness	Honda	52:47.025	128.665
9	13	(England) Dominic Herbertson	BMW	53:18.508	127.398
10	12	(England) Michael Rutter	BMW	53:18.789	127.387

Results (11-34)
Position	Number	Rider	Machine	Time	Speed (mph)
11	18	Shaun Anderson	Suzuki	53:24.752	127.150
12	14	Phillip Crowe	BMW	53:36.419	126.689
13	20	Craig Neve	Honda	53:49.461	126.177
14	22	Rob Hodson	Honda	53:52.982	126.040
15	21	Brian McCormack	BMW	54:03.517	125.630
16	24	Paul Jordan	Yamaha	54:15.357	125.173
17	19	Samuel West	BMW	54:23.101	124.876
18	32	Stephen Smith	Honda	54:39.931	124.236
19	62	Ryan Cringle*	Honda	54:55.243	123.658
20	43	Allann Venter	BMW	55:14.050	122.956
21	25	Michael Evans	Suzuki	55:34.828	122.190
22	29	David Datzer	BMW	55:36.518	122.129
23	35	Mark Parrett	BMW	56:03.749	121.140
24	38	Mark Goodings	Kawasaki	56:05.542	121.075
25	46	Forest Dunn	Suzuki	56:06.885	121.027
26	36	Stefano Bonetti	Honda	56:07.279	121.013
27	53	Rhys Hardisty	Yamaha	56:09.530	120.932
28	45	Michael Russell	BMW	56:29.369	120.224
29	49	James Chawke	Suzuki	57:05.460	118.957
30	54	Anthony Redmond	BMW	57:09.207	118.827
31	57	Rennie Scaysbrook	BMW	57:16.242	118.584
32	61	Erno Kostamo*	BMW	57:16.605	118.572
33	52	Xavier Denis	Yamaha	57:21.984	118.386
34	34	Baz Furber	BMW	58:23.482	116.308

=== Carole Nash Supertwin TT Race 2 ===
Results (1-10)
Position	Number	Rider	Machine	Time	Speed (mph)
1	10	(England) Peter Hickman	Yamaha	56:55.114	119.318
2	8	(France) Pierre Yves Bian	Paton	57:42.898	117.671
3	7	(Australia) Joshua Brookes	Kawasaki	57:44.900	117.603
4	11	(Italy) Stefano Bonetti	Paton	58:12.298	116.681
5	5	(England) Rob Hodson	Kawasaki	58:19.874	116.428
6	24	(England) Baz Furber	Yamaha	58:55.719	115.248
7	19	(Isle of Man) Michael Evans	Aprilia	59:12.651	114.699
8	12	(Italy) Francesco Curinga	Paton	59:20.322	114.451
9	13	(Czech Republic) Michal Dokoupil	Aprilia	59:35.707	113.959
10	45	(England) Michael Russell	Aprilia	01:00:01.194	113.152

Results (11-23)
Position	Number	Rider	Machine	Time	Speed (mph)
11	41	Martin Morris	Aprilia	01:00:33.214	112.155
12	25	Jonathan Goetschy	Aprilia	01:00:37.337	112.028
13	32	Paul Cassidy	Kawasaki	01:00:44.599	111.805
14	30	Paul Potchy Williams	Kawasaki	01:00:44.669	111.803
15	38	Gareth Arnold	Aprilia	01:00:45.955	111.763
16	48	Miroslav Sloboda	Kawasaki	01:01:36.918	110.223
17	42	Tom Weeden	Kawasaki	01:02:05.526	109.376
18	44	Pete Murray	Kawasaki	01:02:14.403	109.116
19	50	David Brook	Aprilia	01:02:24.129	108.833
20	47	Masayuki Yamanaka	Kawasaki	01:02:33.765	108.553
21	53	Andy Hornby	Paton	01:04:12.740	105.765
22	54	Jack Petrie*	Kawasaki	01:05:28.553	103.724
23	34	Vinny Brennan	Kawasaki	01:13:00.632	93.019

=== Milwaukee Senior TT ===
Results (1–10)
Position	Number	Rider	Machine	Time	Speed (mph)
1	10	(England) Peter Hickman	BMW	01:42:29.489	132.526
2	2	(England) Dean Harrison	Kawasaki	01:42:49.478	132.097
3	6	(Northern Ireland) Michael Dunlop	Honda	01:43:09.911	131.661
4	11	(Isle of Man) Conor Cummins	Honda	01:44:40.829	129.755
5	7	(Australia) Joshua Brookes	BMW	01:45:04.393	129.270
6	5	(England) James Hillier	Yamaha	01:45:41.862	128.506
7	3	(England) John McGuinness	Honda	01:45:52.647	128.288
8	1	(Australia) David Johnson	Honda	01:46:40.752	127.324
9	8	(England) Davey Todd	Honda	01:47:13.065	126.684
10	22	(England) Rob Hodson	Honda	01:47:17.121	126.604

Results (11-31)
Position	Number	Rider	Machine	Time	Speed (mph)
11	20	Craig Neve	Honda	01:47:21.596	126.516
12	18	Shaun Anderson	Suzuki	01:47:30.999	126.332
13	21	Brian McCormack	BMW	01:48:19.203	125.395
14	28	James Hind	Suzuki	01:48:28.399	125.218
15	14	Phillip Crowe	BMW	01:48:35.885	125.074
16	24	Paul Jordan	Yamaha	01:49:34.199	123.965
17	32	Stephen Smith	Honda	01:50:09.655	123.300
18	27	Julian Trummer	Honda	01:50:28.757	122.944
19	25	Michael Evans	Suzuki	01:50:31.955	122.885
20	62	Ryan Cringle*	Honda	01:50:36.888	122.794
21	43	Allann Venter	BMW	01:51:11.519	122.156
22	46	Forest Dunn	Suzuki	01:51:17.794	122.041
23	47	Richard Wilson	Honda	01:51:59.582	121.283
24	49	James Chawke	Suzuki	01:52:06.343	121.161
25	29	David Datzer	BMW	01:52:08.460	121.123
26	45	Michael Russell	BMW	01:52:30.279	120.731
27	55	Amalric Blanc	BMW	01:53:02.112	120.164
28	53	Rhys Hardisty	Yamaha	01:53:30.816	119.658
29	34	Baz Furber	BMW	01:53:57.380	119.193
30	54	Anthony Redmond	BMW	01:54:35.961	118.524
31	61	Erno Kostamo*	BMW	01:54:43.805	118.389

== Wins table ==
	Rider	Wins
1	(England) Peter Hickman	4
1	(Northern Ireland) Michael Dunlop	4
3	(England) Ben Birchall	2
3	(England) Tom Birchall	2

== Bibliography ==
"Island Racer 2023: Ultimate Guide to This Year's TT". Island Racer. Mortons Media Group. 2023. SKU: 5684232 – via Kelsey Publishing.
