= 2025 Isle of Man TT =

Annual motorcycle racing event

2025 Isle of Man TT Races
- Isle of Man TT Mountain Course layout

Race details
- Date: 26 May – 6 June 2025
- Location: Douglas, Isle of Man
- Course: Isle of Man TT Mountain Course; 37.733 mi (60.725 km)

The 2025 Isle of Man Tourist Trophy was held between 26 May and 6 June on the Isle of Man TT Mountain Course. Due to windy conditions, the Senior TT Race was cancelled on 7 June.

In the last lap of the SuperTwin Race, Michael Rutter crashed, resulting in multiple fractures of his spine and ankle.

Peter Hickman could not participate in any of the races in this year's event because he was hospitalized at Noble's Hospital following a crash.

Kieran Clarke in the riders category, Oscar Lawrence in the passengers category and became the fastest newcomer in the Sidecar TT class.

== Schedule ==
Qualifying Week	Race Week			
Mon 26 May - Sun 1 June	2 June	3 June	4 June	6 June
All categories	Superbike TT Race	Superstock TT Race 1	Supersport TT Race 2	Superstock TT Race 2
All categories	Sidecar TT Race 1	Supertwin TT Race 1	Supersport TT Race 2	Sidecar TT Race 2
All categories	Supersport TT Race 1	Supertwin TT Race 1	Supersport TT Race 2	Sidecar TT Race 2
All categories	Supersport TT Race 1	Supertwin TT Race 1	Supersport TT Race 2	Supertwin TT Race 2

== Results ==
=== RST x D3O Superbike TT Race ===
Results (1–10)
Position	Number	Rider	Machine	Time	Speed (mph)
1	8	(England) Davey Todd	BMW	01:08:20.628	132.495
2	6	(Northern Ireland) Michael Dunlop	BMW	01:08:21.925	132.453
3	3	(England) Dean Harrison	Honda	01:09:05.444	131.062
4	19	(Isle of Man) Nathan Harrison	Honda	01:10:02.828	129.273
5	2	(Australia) David Johnson	Kawasaki	01:10:19.482	128.763
6	5	(England) James Hillier	Honda	01:10:21.959	128.687
7	1	(England) John McGuinness	Honda	01:10:32.106	128.379
8	7	(Australia) Joshua Brookes	Honda	01:10:37.811	128.206
9	21	(Isle of Man) Michael Evans	Honda	01:11:02.757	127.456
10	20	(Northern Ireland) Paul Jordan	Honda	01:11:13.130	127.146

=== 3wheeling.media Sidecar TT Race 1 ===
Results (1–10)
Position	Number	Riders	Machine	Time	Speed (mph)
1	1	(Isle of Man) Ryan Crowe / (Isle of Man) Callum Crowe	Honda LCR	37:39.763	120.214
2	3	(England) Ben Birchall / (England) Patrick Rosney	Honda LCR	38:57.433	116.22
3	4	(England) Lee Crawford / (Scotland) Scott Hardie	Kawasaki LCR	39:14.784	115.363
4	6	(England) Todd Ellis / (France) Emmanuelle Clement	Yamaha CES	39:46.941	113.809
5	15	(England) Kieran Clarke / Andrew Johnson	Yamaha CES	39:55.892	113.384
6	12	(England) Steve Ramsden / (England) Mathew Ramsden	Yamaha DMR	40:21.500	112.185
7	7	(England) Lewis Blackstock / (England) Oscar Lawrence	Honda LCR	40:51.483	110.813
8	5	(England) Greg Lambert / (England) Andrew Haynes	Yamaha LCR	41:20.621	109.511
9	13	(England) Robert Dawson / Matthew Sims	Honda LCR	41:30.146	109.092
10	14	(Isle of Man) Darren Hope / Lenny Bumfrey	Honda LCR	41:36.597	108.811

=== Monster Energy Supersport TT Race 1 ===
Results (1–10)
Position	Number	Rider	Machine	Time	Speed (mph)
1	6	(Northern Ireland) Michael Dunlop	Ducati	53:15.950	127.500
2	3	(England) Dean Harrison	Honda	53:26.179	127.093
3	5	(England) James Hillier	Kawasaki	54:11.251	125.331
4	8	(England) Davey Todd	Honda	54:29.244	124.642
5	7	(Australia) Joshua Brookes	Honda	54:39.629	124.247
6	15	(England) Rob Hodson	Yamaha	55:07.481	123.201
7	16	(England) James Hind	Suzuki	55:21.982	122.663
8	13	(England) Dominic Herbertson	Ducati	55:28.440	122.425
9	12	(England) Ian Hutchinson	Yamaha	55:31.041	122.329
10	11	(Isle of Man) Conor Cummins	Ducati	55:47.840	121.716

=== RL360 Superstock TT Race 1 ===
Results (1–10)
Position	Number	Rider	Machine	Time	Speed (mph)
1	3	(England) Dean Harrison	Honda	33:37.235	134.667
2	8	(England) Davey Todd	BMW	33:48.892	133.894
3	6	(Northern Ireland) Michael Dunlop	BMW	34:09.403	132.554
4	5	(England) James Hillier	Honda	34:30.330	131.214
5	12	(England) Ian Hutchinson	BMW	34:34.814	130.930
6	11	(Isle of Man) Conor Cummins	BMW	34:38.504	130.698
7	19	(Isle of Man) Nathan Harrison	Honda	34:40.434	130.577
8	13	(England) Dominic Herbertson	Honda	34:40.659	130.562
9	7	(Australia) Joshua Brookes	Honda	34:48.198	130.091
10	16	(England) James Hind	Honda	34:54.893	129.675

=== Metzeler Supertwin TT Race 1 ===
Results (1–10)
Position	Number	Rider	Machine	Time	Speed (mph)
1	6	(Northern Ireland) Michael Dunlop	Paton	37:01.096	122.307
2	15	(England) Rob Hodson	Paton	37:37.236	120.349
3	1	(Northern Ireland) Paul Jordan	Aprilia	37:38.993	120.255
4	8	(England) Davey Todd	Paton	37:43.241	120.03
5	13	(England) Dominic Herbertson	Paton	37:45.173	119.927
6	7	(Northern Ireland) Adam McLean	Yamaha	37:52.627	119.534
7	14	(Italy) Stefano Bonetti	Paton	37:59.021	119.199
8	12	(England) Baz Furber	Yamaha	38:05.184	118.877
9	3	(England) Michael Rutter	Yamaha	38:31.021	117.548
10	24	(Republic of Ireland) Michael Sweeney	Aprilia	38:43.713	116.906

=== Monster Energy Supersport TT Race 2 ===
Results (1–10)
Position	Number	Rider	Machine	Time	Speed (mph)
1	6	(Northern Ireland) Michael Dunlop	Ducati	01:11:29.191	126.670
2	3	(England) Dean Harrison	Honda	01:11:55.372	125.902
3	8	(England) Davey Todd	Honda	01:12:11.226	125.441
4	1	(Northern Ireland) Paul Jordan	Honda	01:12:49.232	124.350
5	16	(England) James Hind	Suzuki	01:12:52.316	124.262
6	7	(Australia) Joshua Brookes	Honda	01:13:01.532	124.000
7	9	(Republic of Ireland) Mike Browne	Yamaha	01:13:23.794	123.374
8	13	(England) Dominic Herbertson	Ducati	01:13:25.136	123.336
9	12	(England) Ian Hutchinson	Yamaha	01:13:34.682	123.069
10	18	(Isle of Man) Michael Evans	Triumph	01:13:39.168	122.944

=== Opul Superstock TT Race 2 ===
Results (1–10)
Position	Number	Rider	Machine	Time	Speed (mph)
1	3	(England) Dean Harrison	Honda	51:24.933	132.088
2	8	(England) Davey Todd	BMW	51:40.964	131.406
3	6	(Northern Ireland) Michael Dunlop	BMW	52:13.774	130.030
4	5	(England) James Hillier	Honda	52:23.726	129.618
5	11	(Isle of Man) Conor Cummins	BMW	52:31.213	129.310
6	7	(Australia) Joshua Brookes	Honda	52:37.123	129.068
7	19	(Isle of Man) Nathan Harrison	Honda	52:41.450	128.891
8	1	(England) John McGuinness	Honda	52:52.367	128.448
9	13	(England) Dominic Herbertson	Honda	52:55.968	128.302
10	2	(Australia) David Johnson	Kawasaki	53:05.826	127.905

=== 3wheeling.media Sidecar TT Race 2 ===
Results (1–10)
Position	Number	Riders	Machine	Time	Speed (mph)
1	1	(Isle of Man) Ryan Crowe / (Isle of Man) Callum Crowe	Honda LCR	37:42.692	120.059
2	3	(England) Ben Birchall / (England) Patrick Rosney	Honda LCR	38:51.595	116.511
3	4	(England) Lee Crawford / (Scotland) Scott Hardie	Kawasaki LCR	39:14.612	115.372
4	6	(England) Todd Ellis / (France) Emmanuelle Clement	Yamaha CES	39:31.416	114.554
5	15	(England) Kieran Clarke / Andrew Johnson	Yamaha CES	39:42.255	114.033
6	12	(England) George Holden / (England) Mark Wilkes	Yamaha DMR	40:27.182	111.922
7	10	(England) Stephen Kershaw / (England) Rhys Gibbons	Honda LCR	40:59.409	110.456
8	13	(England) Greg Lambert / (England) Andrew Haynes	Yamaha LCR	41:26.479	109.253
9	7	(England) Steve Ramsden / (England) Mathew Ramsden	Yamaha DMR	41:26.909	109.234
10	18	(Belgium) Renzo Van der Donckt / (Belgium) Vale Van der Donckt	Suzuki LCR	41:39.132	108.700

=== Entire Cover insurance Supertwin TT Race 2 ===
Results (1–10)
Position	Number	Rider	Machine	Time	Speed (mph)
1	6	(Northern Ireland) Michael Dunlop	Paton	56:04.007	121.131
2	8	(England) Davey Todd	Paton	56:30.782	120.174
3	13	(England) Dominic Herbertson	Paton	56:51.368	119.449
4	1	(Northern Ireland) Paul Jordan	Aprilia	56:54.510	119.339
5	9	(Republic of Ireland) Mike Browne	Kawasaki	57:00.537	119.129
6	7	(Northern Ireland) Adam Mclean	Yamaha	57:05.882	118.943
7	12	(England) Baz Furber	Yamaha	57:11.476	118.749
8	11	(Isle of Man) Joe Yeardsley	Aprilia	57:55.661	117.239
9	22	(Czech Republic) Michal Dokoupil	Aprilia	58:15.956	116.559
10	24	(Republic of Ireland) Michael Sweeney	Aprilia	58:26.685	116.202

== Wins table ==
	Rider	Wins
7	(Northern Ireland) Michael Dunlop	4
7	(England) Dean Harrison	2
2	(Isle of Man) Ryan Crowe / (Isle of Man) Callum Crowe	2
7	(England) Davey Todd	1

== Bibliography ==
"Island Racer 2025: Ultimate Guide to the 2025 Isle of Man TT". Island Racer. Mortons Media Group. 2025. SKU: 6396666 – via Kelsey Publishing.
