= 2012 Southern 100 Races =

Motorbike race

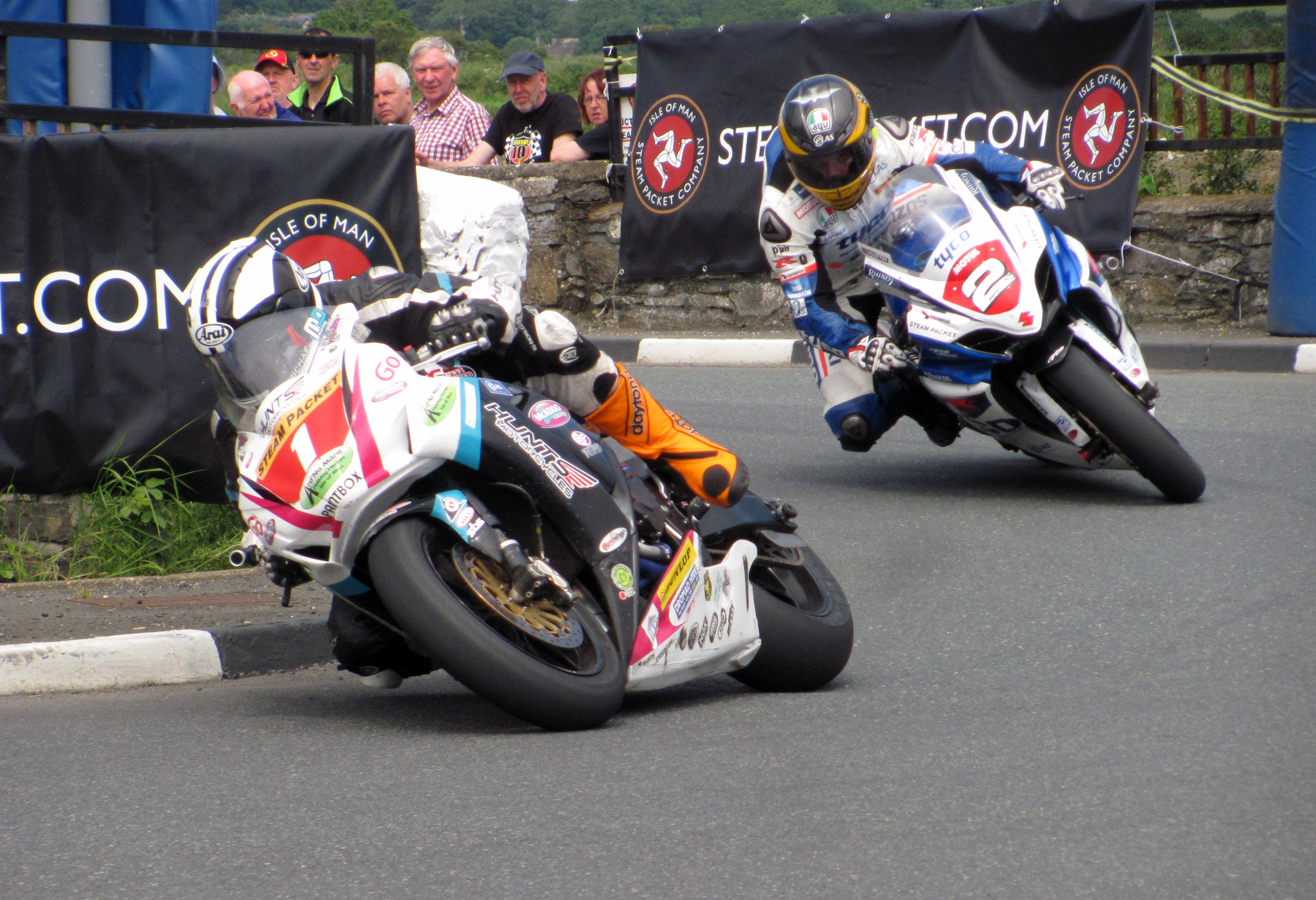
- Michael Dunlop (1) leading Guy Martin (2) at a 2012 Southern 100 Solo Championship race

Race details
| Date | 9–12 July 2012 |
| Location | Castletown, Isle of Man |
| Course | Road Course; 4.25 mi (6.84 km) |

The 2012 Southern 100 held between Monday 9 July and Thursday 12 July on the 4.25-mile Billown Circuit near Castletown, Isle of Man.

== Results ==
=== Practice Times ===
==== Practice Times & Leaderboard Superbike ====
Monday 9 July 2012 First Practice Session Billown Course

| Rank | Rider | Team | Speed | Time |
|---|---|---|---|---|
| 1 | (England) Guy Martin | Suzuki 1000cc | 108.078 mph | 2:21.520 |
| 2 | (Northern Ireland) Michael Dunlop | Honda 1000cc | 108.066 mph | 2:21.580 |
| 3 | (Northern Ireland) Ryan Farquhar | Kawasaki 1000cc | 106.681 mph | 2:23.418 |
| 4 | (Isle of Man) Conor Cummins | Suzuki 1000cc | 105.956 mph | 2:24.399 |
| 5 | (England) Russ Mountford | Honda 1000cc | 104.181 mph | 2:26.860 |
| 6 | (Wales) Ian Lougher | Kawasaki 1000cc | 103.951 mph | 2:27.185 |
| 7 | (Northern Ireland) Davy Morgan | Suzuki 1000cc | 103.871 mph | 2:27.298 |
| 8 | (England) Scott Wilson | BMW 1000cc | 103.093 mph | 2:28.410 |
| 9 | (England) Mark Parrett | BMW 1000cc | 102.472 mph | 2:29.309 |
| 10 | (Northern Ireland) Michael Pearson | Honda 1000cc | 102.363 mph | 2:29.468 |

=== Race results ===
==== Race 10; 2012 Southern 100 Races Solo Championship final standings ====
Thursday 12 July 2012 9 laps – 42.50 miles Billown Circuit

| Rank | Rider | Team | Time | Speed |
|---|---|---|---|---|
| 1 | (Northern Ireland) Michael Dunlop | Honda 1000cc | 20:36.803 | 111.335 mph |
| 2 | (England) Guy Martin | Suzuki 1000cc | + 5.167 | 110.872 mph |
| 3 | (Isle of Man) Conor Cummins | Suzuki 1000cc | + 8.800 | 110.549 mph |
| 4 | (Northern Ireland) Ryan Farquhar | Kawasaki 1000cc | + 14.128 | 110.078 mph |
| 5 | (Wales) Ian Lougher | Kawasaki 1000cc | + 20.831 | 109.491 mph |
| 6 | (England) Dean Harrison | Kawasaki 1000cc | + 25.265 | 109.107 mph |
| 7 | (Northern Ireland) Jamie Hamilton | Kawasaki 1000cc | + 31.417 | 108.577 mph |
| 8 | (England) Lee Vernon | BMW 1000cc | + 34.575 | 108.308 mph |
| 9 | (Northern Ireland) Michael Pearson | Honda 1000cc | + 53.001 | 106.760 mph |
| 10 | (Northern Ireland) Davey Morgan | Suzuki 1000cc | + 53.027 | 106.758 mph |

Fastest Lap and New Course Record: Michael Dunlop, 2' 14.702 113.584 mph on lap 6
