= Michael Dunlop =

Northern Irish professional motorcycle racer

Michael Dunlop MBE
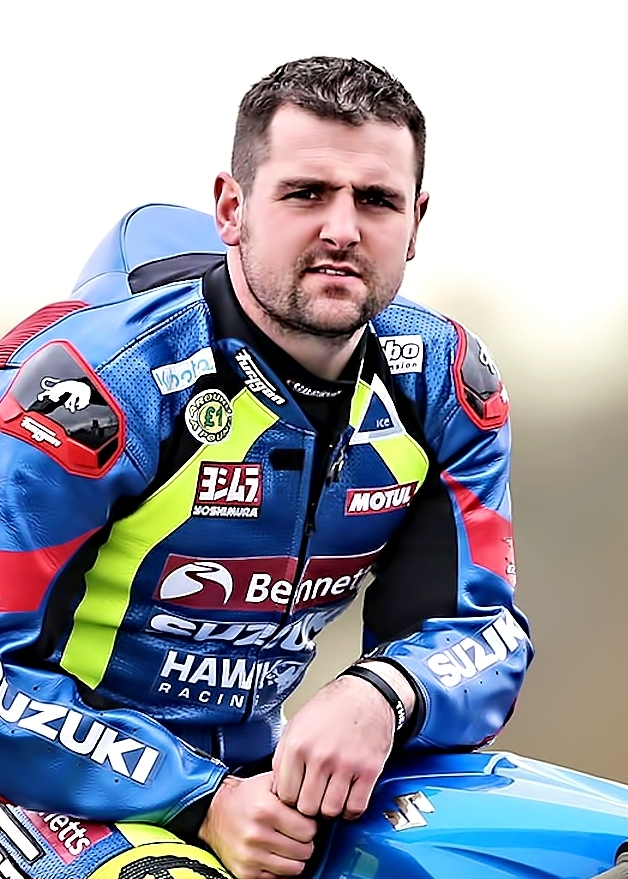
- Nationality: Northern Irish
- Born: 10 April 1989 (age 37); Ballymoney, Northern Ireland
- Current team: MD Racing
- Bike number: 6
- Website: Michael Dunlop Racing
Motorcycle racing career statistics
Isle of Man TT career
TTs contested	18 (2007–present)
TT wins	36
First TT win	2009 Supersport TT Race 2
Last TT win	2026 Sportbike TT Race 1
TT podiums	55
- TT Course fastest lap 135.970 mph or 218.823 km/h

Michael Dunlop (born 10 April 1989) is a Northern Irish professional motorcycle road racer. He holds the all-time record for victories and podium finishes at the Isle of Man TT, with 36 wins and 55 podiums, surpassing the previous record of 26 wins held by his uncle Joey Dunlop in 2024. These results make him the event's most successful competitor by wins and podium finishes.

Dunlop is part of a prominent racing dynasty: the son of Robert Dunlop, brother of William Dunlop, and nephew of Joey Dunlop. His family legacy was documented in Road (2014), and he later published his autobiography Road Racer: It's in My Blood (2017).

In the 2025 King's Birthday Honours, Dunlop was appointed a Member of the Order of the British Empire (MBE) for services to motorcycle racing.

== Career ==
=== North West 200 ===
Dunlop secured his first North West 200 victory in 2008, winning the 250cc race on a Honda. The win came two days after the death of his father, Robert Dunlop, during practice for the event, and the day before his funeral.

In 2013, Dunlop claimed his second North West 200 victory by winning the Superstock race on a Honda, finishing ahead of Bruce Anstey and Lee Johnston.

In 2014, Dunlop added two further victories to his North West 200 record, winning both the Superstock and Superbike Race 2 events on a BMW. The wins marked his third and fourth career victories at the meeting and his first with the German manufacturer. He was also named the first recipient of the Robert Dunlop Man of the Meeting award, introduced to honour his father's legacy at the event.

In 2016, Dunlop added a fifth North West 200 victory by winning the Superbike race on a BMW. During the race, he set a new Superbike lap record of 4 minutes 22.095 seconds at an average speed of 123.207 mph.

In 2025, Dunlop returned to winning form at the North West 200, claiming victories in the Supersport, Superstock, and Superbike races. The wins marked his first on Ducati machinery and brought his career total at the event to eight, ending a nine-year spell without a victory there. His Superbike win was initially disputed due to a ten-second penalty for missing the Mather's Cross chicane, but the penalty was later rescinded, and Dunlop was officially declared the winner.

In 2026, Dunlop secured his ninth North West 200 victory by winning a Supersport race that was twice red‑flagged. The result was declared after four laps, with Dunlop taking the win on his V2 Ducati for his third Supersport win at the event.

=== Isle of Man TT ===
Dunlop made his Isle of Man TT debut in 2007 and claimed his first victory two years later, winning the second Supersport race in 2009 on a Yamaha. Over the following decade, he established himself as one of the most successful riders in the event's history, securing wins across multiple classes including Superbike, Supersport, Superstock, and Supertwin. In 2016, he became the first rider to complete a lap of the Mountain Course in under 17 minutes, setting a new outright lap record with a time of 16 minutes 53.929 seconds at an average speed of 133.962 mph during the Senior TT. His record stood until 2018, when Peter Hickman posted a lap of 135.452 mph during the Senior TT, becoming the first rider to surpass Dunlop’s benchmark. Dunlop returned to the event in 2019, a year after the death of his brother William, who was killed in a practice session at the Skerries 100 in July 2018.

In 2024, Dunlop surpassed his uncle Joey Dunlop's long-standing record of 26 TT wins, becoming the most successful rider in the event's history. In May 2025, a left-bend at the 27th mile from startline was chosen to be named MD's, to acknowledge the event of his 27th win in 2024.

Dunlop continued his winning form in 2025, claiming his 33rd TT victory in the second Supertwin race and extending his podium tally to 51. During that race, he also set a new class lap record with an average speed of 123.056 mph on the final lap.

In 2026, Dunlop won the first Supersport race, he finished 24.470 seconds ahead of Dean Harrison and secured his ninth successive win in the class. He added further victories in Supersport race two and Sportbike race one, extending his total to 36 TT wins, with the latter featuring a new lap record of 124.350 mph. Dunlop also took part in a tribute lap on a replica of his uncle Joey Dunlop's 2000 Formula 1‑winning Honda SP1.

=== Cookstown 100 ===
Dunlop has achieved multiple victories at the Cookstown 100, Northern Ireland's oldest motorcycle road race. His wins span Superbike, Supersport, and Open classes, secured on machinery from manufacturers including Honda, Yamaha, BMW, and Ducati. In 2025, he won both the Supersport and feature Superbike races, setting a new outright lap record of 1 minute 22.377 seconds at an average speed of 91.773 mph.

At the 2026 Cookstown 100, Dunlop recorded four wins. He finished first in the Open A Invitational race, the Moto3 race, the Open A race, and the feature race. In the Moto3 race, he finished 9.8 seconds ahead of Dan Sayle, with Chris Meyer in third place. The Open A race was stopped following an incident, and Dunlop was confirmed as the winner based on his position at the time of the stoppage, ahead of Michael Sweeney and Darryl Tweed. In the feature Superbike race, he set a new outright lap record of 92.1 mph, with a best lap time of 1 minute 22.047 seconds, and finished 8.65 seconds ahead of Sweeney, with Marcus Simpson in third place.

=== Armoy road races ===
Dunlop has had a long-standing association with the Armoy Road Races, where he has been a consistent front-runner across multiple classes. In 2022, he withdrew from the meeting, stating that his team was "not being treated on an equal and fair basis" compared with other entrants. He returned in 2023, claiming his tenth victory in the Race of Legends, the event's headline race. This brought his total number of wins at Armoy to 29, spanning various categories including Superbike, Supersport, Supertwin, and others. In July 2024, Dunlop said he would not return to the event, citing budget limitations and dissatisfaction with club support.

=== Southern 100 ===
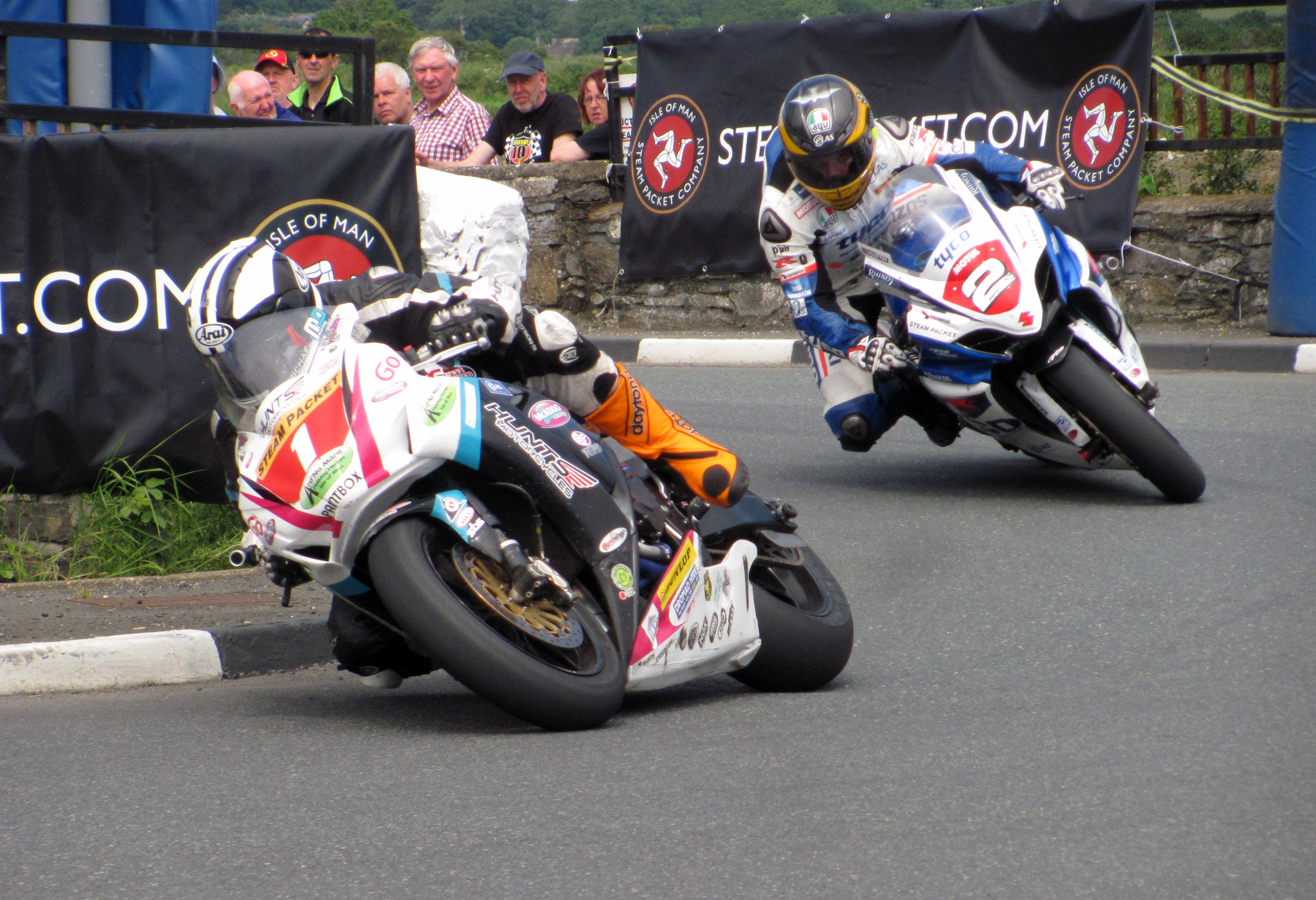
Dunlop leading Guy Martin at the 2012 Isle of Man Southern 100 road races

Dunlop has been a consistent front-runner at the Southern 100 for over a decade, with victories across Superbike and Supersport classes. He claimed the Solo Championship title in 2011, having won both Superbike races aboard a PBM Kawasaki, and set a new lap record of 112.541 mph in the feature race. By 2019, he had reached 21 career wins, although that year’s campaign ended prematurely after he crashed out of the Senior race while chasing Dean Harrison, sustaining a broken pelvis and multiple other injuries that ruled him out of the feature event. In 2025, he claimed his 26th Southern 100 victory in a record-breaking Supersport race aboard a Milwaukee Ducati, narrowly defeating Davey Todd and becoming the first rider to win a 600cc race at over 112 mph.

=== Daytona 200 ===
Dunlop has competed at the Daytona 200 twice, finishing 11th on his debut in 2021 and returning in 2025 to place ninth aboard a Milwaukee Ducati Panigale V2.

=== Tandragee 100 ===
Dunlop has competed at the Tandragee 100 since at least 2006, achieving 13 race victories at the event as of 2025. After a 12-year absence following his 2013 appearance, he returned in 2025 to win both the Open and Feature Superbike races aboard a BMW. During the event, he set a new absolute lap record of 111.584 mph (2:52.403), becoming the first rider to record a 111 mph lap at Tandragee. In 2026, he added four further victories to increase his career total to 17. He also set a new qualifying lap record on his MD Racing BMW, recording an average speed of 110.076 mph.

== Complete TT record ==
2026	Superbike TT 3	Superstock TT 1 Cancelled	Supersport TT 1 1	Supersport TT 2 1	Senior TT 5	Sportbike TT 1 1	Sportbike TT 2 Cancelled	Superstock TT 2 Cancelled
2025	Superbike TT 2	Superstock TT 1 3	Supersport TT 1 1	Supersport TT 2 1	Senior TT Cancelled	Supertwin TT 1 1	Supertwin TT 2 1	Superstock TT 2 3
2024	Superbike TT 4	Superstock TT 1 3	Supersport TT 1 1	Supersport TT 2 1	Senior TT DNF	Supertwin TT 1 1	Supertwin TT 2 1	Superstock TT 2 Cancelled
2023	Superbike TT 1	Superstock TT 1 2	Supersport TT 1 1	Supersport TT 2 1	Senior TT 3	Lightweight TT 1 1	Lightweight TT 2 DNF	Superstock TT 2 2
2022	Superbike TT 3	Superstock TT 5	Supersport TT 1 1	Supersport TT 2 1	Senior TT 5	Lightweight TT DNF		
2019	Superbike TT 6	Superstock TT 4	Supersport TT 1 5	Supersport TT 2 6	Senior TT 4	Lightweight TT 1		
2018	Superbike TT 1	Superstock TT 2	Supersport TT 1 1	Supersport TT 2 5	Senior TT 4	Lightweight TT 1		
2017	Superbike TT DNF	Superstock TT 6	Supersport TT 1 1	Supersport TT 2 Cancelled	Senior TT 1	Lightweight TT 7		
2016	Superbike TT 1	Superstock TT DNF	Supersport TT 1 DSQ	Supersport TT 2 2	Senior TT 1			
2015	Superbike TT DNF	Superstock TT 2	Supersport TT 1 DNF	Supersport TT 2 DNF	Senior TT 5	Lightweight TT DNF		
2014	Superbike TT 1	Superstock TT 1 1	Supersport TT 3	Supersport TT 2 1	Senior TT 1	Lightweight TT DNS		
2013	Superbike TT 1	Superstock TT 1	Supersport TT 1 1	Supersport TT 2 1	Senior TT 2			
2012	Superbike TT 10	Superstock TT 2	Supersport TT 1 DNF	Supersport TT 2 1	Senior TT Cancelled	Lightweight TT 15		
2011	Superbike TT 5	Superstock TT 1	Supersport TT 1 DNF	Supersport TT 2 DNF	Senior TT 6			
2010	Superbike TT 2	Superstock TT 8	Supersport TT 1 3	Supersport TT 2 2	Senior TT DNF			
2009	Superbike TT DNF	Superstock TT DNF	Supersport TT 1 DNF	Supersport TT 2 1	Senior TT DNF	Lightweight 250 TT 2		
2008	Superbike TT 14	Superstock TT DNF	Supersport Junior TT 1 10	Supersport Junior TT 2 8	Senior TT 10	Lightweight 250 TT DNF		

== British Superbike Championship ==
Year	Make	1			2			3			4			5			6			7			8			9			10			11			12			Pos	Pts
Year	Make	R1	R2	R3	R1	R2	R3	R1	R2	R3	R1	R2	R3	R1	R2	R3	R1	R2	R3	R1	R2	R3	R1	R2	R3	R1	R2	R3	R1	R2	R3	R1	R2	R3	R1	R2	R3	Pos	Pts
2014	BMW	BHI; 24	BHI; Ret		OUL	OUL		SNE	SNE		KNO	KNO		BHGP	BHGP		THR	THR		OUL	OUL	OUL	CAD	CAD		DON	DON		ASS	ASS		SIL	SIL		BHGP	BHGP	BHGP	NC	0

Year	Make	1		2		3			4		5		6			7		8			9			10		11		12			Pos	Pts
Year	Make	R1	R2	R1	R2	R1	R2	R3	R1	R2	R1	R2	R1	R2	R3	R1	R2	R1	R2	R3	R1	R2	R3	R1	R2	R1	R2	R1	R2	R3	Pos	Pts
2016	BMW	SIL; Ret	SIL; Ret	OUL; Ret	OUL; DNS	BHI	BHI		KNO	KNO	SNE	SNE	THR	THR		BHGP	BHGP	CAD	CAD		OUL	OUL	OUL	DON	DON	ASS	ASS	BHGP	BHGP	BHGP	NC	0
2017	Suzuki	DON; 16	DON; 17	BHI	BHI	OUL; 19	OUL; Ret		KNO	KNO	SNE	SNE	BHGP	BHGP		THR	THR	CAD	CAD		SIL	SIL	SIL	OUL	OUL	ASS	ASS	BHGP	BHGP	BHGP	NC	0

Year	Bike	1			2			3			4			5			6			7			8			9			10			11			Pos	Pts
Year	Bike	R1	R2	R3	R1	R2	R3	R1	R2	R3	R1	R2	R3	R1	R2	R3	R1	R2	R3	R1	R2	R3	R1	R2	R3	R1	R2	R3	R1	R2	R3	R1	R2	R3	Pos	Pts
2021	Suzuki	OUL	OUL	OUL	KNO	KNO	KNO	BHGP	BHGP	BHGP	THR	THR	THR	DON	DON	DON	CAD	CAD	CAD	SNE	SNE	SNE	SIL	SIL	SIL	OUL; 19	OUL; 14	OUL; 17	DON	DON	DON	BHGP	BHGP	BHGP	31st	2
2023	Honda	SIL	SIL	SIL	OUL; Ret	OUL; Ret	OUL; DNS	DON	DON	DON	KNO	KNO	KNO	SNE	SNE	SNE	BRH	BRH	BRH	THR	THR	THR	CAD	CAD	CAD	OUL; 19	OUL; Ret	OUL; Ret	DON; 21	DON; Ret	DON; Ret	BRH	BRH	BRH	NC	0

=== British Supersport Championship ===
(key) (Races in bold indicate pole position; races in italics indicate fastest lap)

Year	Bike	1	2	3	4	5	6	7	8	9	10	11	12	Pos	Pts
2009	Yamaha	BHI	OUL	DON	THR	SNE	KNO	MAL	BHGP	CAD	CRO	SIL; Ret	OUL	NC	0
2010	Yamaha	BHI	THR	OUL	CAD	MAL	KNO	SNE	BHGP	CAD	CRO	SIL	OUL; 22	NC	0

Year	Bike	1	2	3	4	5	6	7	8	9	10	11	12	13	14	15	16	17	18	19	20	21	22	Pos	Pts
2022	Yamaha	SIL	SIL	OUL; 19	OUL; Ret	DON	DON	KNO	KNO	BRH	BRH	THR	THR	CAD	CAD	SNE	SNE	OUL	OUL	DON	DON	BRH	BRH	NC	0
2023	Yamaha	SLV	SLV	OPK; 11	OPK; 13	DPK	DPK	KNH	KNH	STN	STN	BRH	BRH	TXN	TXN	CPK	CPK	OPK	OPK	DPK	DPK	BRH	BRH	29th	10

=== FIM Endurance World Championship ===
Year	Team	Bike	Tyre	Rider	Pts	TC
2025	Team LRP Poland	BMW S1000RR	**D**	(United Kingdom) Michael Dunlop (France) Enzo Boulom (United Kingdom) Danny Webb	6*	17th*

== Honours and awards ==
In 2025, Dunlop was appointed a Member of the Order of the British Empire (MBE) for services to motorcycle racing.

Dunlop has been named Irish Motorcyclist of the Year three times.

== Media and publications ==
Dunlop features prominently in the 2014 documentary Road, narrated by Liam Neeson.

In 2017, Dunlop published his autobiography Road Racer: It's in My Blood.

== See also ==
- Robert Dunlop
- Joey Dunlop
- William Dunlop
- North West 200
- Isle of Man TT
- Road (2014 film)

== Bibliography ==
- Dunlop, Michael (19 April 2018). Road Racer: It's in My Blood. London: Michael O'Mara Books. ISBN 978-1782439097.
