= Southern 100 =

Motorcycle road racing event

Southern 100 Road Races

Billown Circuit

- Venue: Castletown, Isle of Man
- Date: 2nd Week of July (Mon-Thurs)
- Type: Road Course
- Clerk of the Course: Giles Olley
- Event Organiser: Southern 100 M.C.R.C. Ltd
- Event Promoter: Southern 100 M.C.R.C. Ltd
- Principal sponsor: Isle of Man Department for Enterprise

History
- First races: 1955
- First winners (1955): Dave Chadwick (250 cc); Derek Ennett (350 cc); Terry Shepherd (500 cc)
- Most wins: Ian Lougher (32)
- Lap record: Dean Harrison; 2 minutes, 10.835 secs 116.941 mph (188.198 km/h), 2022

The Southern 100 is a motorcycle road racing event held on the Isle of Man in July of each year. The event was first held in 1955, with three races for different classes of solo motorcycles; the 2015 calendar included twelve races for various classes. The participants compete on the Billown Circuit in the south of the island, starting and finishing at Castletown.

== History ==
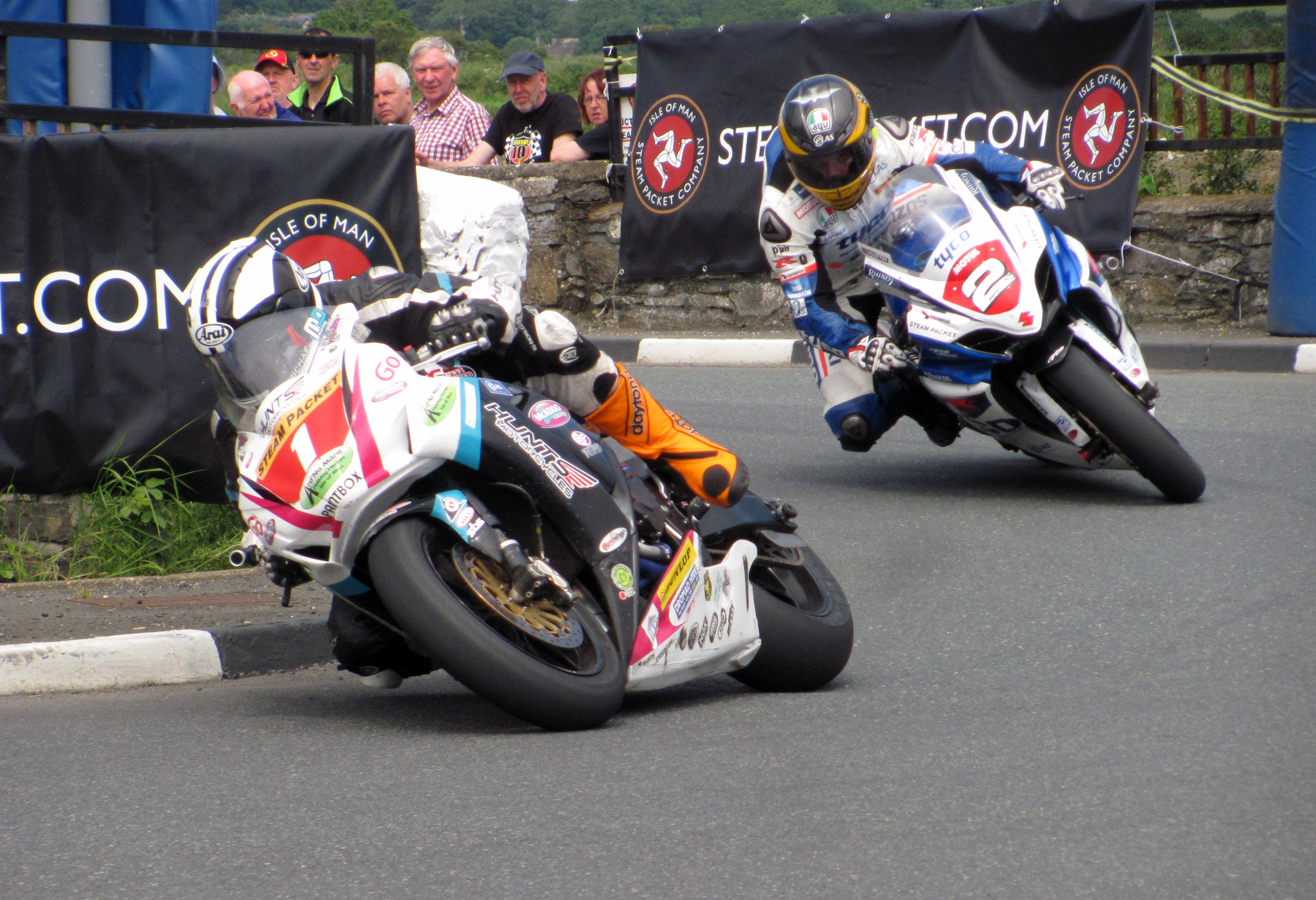
Michael Dunlop leading Guy Martin in 2012

In 1955, the inaugural Southern 100 held events for each of the two traditional classes, the 250 cc and the 350 cc, over six laps with a race distance of 25 miles (40 km). A 500 cc race was also included as the feature race with 24 laps, totalling in excess of 100 miles (160 km).

The meeting that year had 73 entrants, with the first race held, the 350 cc event, won by Manxman Derek Ennett.

In 1958, the event was granted "National Status" and eleven years later was included in the British Championships. The races were part of the Irish Regal Championships in 1992 and 1993, and is now one of five FIM-sanctioned International meetings in the British Isles. Sidecar racing was introduced in 1962 and currently constitutes two of the twelve scheduled races.

Ian Lougher has achieved the most solo-machine victories, with 32 wins, followed closely by Joey Dunlop with 31. Dave Molyneux leads the Sidecar victories, with 15. The Billown Circuit has been lapped with an average speed over 100 miles per hour (160 km/h) on a number of occasions, but it was first achieved by Dave Leech in the 1989 Southern 100 Solo Championship Race riding a 1000 cc Yamaha at an average speed of 100.26 mph.

The 2023 meeting was abandoned following a serious incident on 11th July 2023 where a competitor identified as Ireland's Alan Connor and a marshal were killed.
