= Paul Jordan (motorcyclist) =

British motorcycle racer

- Nationality: Irish
- Born: 7 June 1991 (age 35); Magherafelt, Northern Ireland
- Current team: Burrows Racing

Paul Jordan (born 7 June 1991) is a Grand Prix motorcycle racer from Northern Ireland.

Jordan has been a regular Isle of Man TT competitor since 2017. He achieved his first TT podium in 2022, with a third place in the Supertwin race on a 650 cc Kawasaki. In 2025, he went on to win the Classic TT Historic Junior race, finishing 1st.

== Career statistics ==
=== By season ===
Season	Class	Motorcycle	Team	Number	Race	Win	Podium	Pole	FLap	Pts	Plcd
2008	125cc	Honda	KRP	68	1	0	0	0	0	0	NC
2009	125cc	Honda	KRP Bradley Smith Racing	92	1	0	0	0	0	0	NC
Total					**2**	**0**	**0**	**0**	**0**	**0**	

=== Races by year ===
Year	Class	Bike	1	2	3	4	5	6	7	8	9	10	11	12	13	14	15	16	17	Pos	Points
2008	125cc	Honda	QAT	SPA	POR	CHN	FRA	ITA	CAT	GBR; Ret	NED	GER	CZE	RSM	INP	JPN	AUS	MAL	VAL	NC	0
2009	125cc	Honda	QAT	JPN	SPA	FRA	ITA	CAT	NED	GER	GBR; 16	CZE	INP	RSM	POR	AUS	MAL	VAL		NC	0

=== British 125cc Championship ===
(key) (Races in bold indicate pole position, races in italics indicate fastest lap)

Year	Bike	1	2	3	4	5	6	7	8	9	10	11	12	Pos	Pts
2009	Honda	BHI; 5	OUL; Ret	DON; 8	THR; 3	SNE; 1	KNO; 12	MAL; Ret	BHGP; 8	CAD; 6	CRO; 10	SIL; 8	OUL; 8	**5th**	**104**

=== British Supersport Championship ===
(key) (Races in bold indicate pole position; races in italics indicate fastest lap)

Year	Bike	1	2	3	4	5	6	7	8	9	10	11	12	Pos	Pts
2010	Honda	BHI; 18	THR; 13	OUL; DNS	CAD; 24	MAL; 15	KNO; Ret	SNE; Ret	BHGP; Ret	CAD	CRO	SIL	OUL	31st	4

Year	Bike	1	2	3	4	5	6	7	8	9	10	11	12	13	14	15	16	17	18	19	20	21	22	Pos	Pts
2022	Yamaha	SIL; 16	SIL; 17	OUL	OUL	DON	DON	KNO	KNO	BRH	BRH	THR; 21	THR; 23	CAD	CAD	SNE	SNE	OUL; 22	OUL; Ret	DON	DON	BRH	BRH	31st	7
2023	Yamaha	SLV; 26	SLV; Ret	OPK; DNS	OPK; 23	DPK	DPK	KNH	KNH	STN	STN	BRH	BRH	TXN	TXN	CPK	CPK	OPK	OPK	DPK	DPK	BRH	BRH	NC	0
