= 1932 Isle of Man TT =

Annual motorcycle racing event

The 1932 Isle of Man Tourist Trophy race meeting was watched by Prince George, Duke of Kent, the first royal visitor to the Isle of Man TT Races. The 1932 Junior TT Race was won by Stanley Woods riding a Norton at an average race speed of 77.16 mph (124.18 km/h) from Wal Handley and Tyrell Smith riding for the Rudge factory. Again Rudge were beaten in the 1932 Lightweight TT Race by Leo H. Davenport riding a New Imperial motorcycle at an average race speed of 70.48 mph (113.43 km/h). The 1932 Senior TT Race provided Stanley Woods with the "Norton Habit" and another Junior/Senior double win at an average race speed of 79.38 mph (127.75 km/h). The 1932 Senior TT Race was initially led on the first lap by Norton teammate Jimmie Simpson who set a new overall lap record of 27 minutes and 47 seconds at an average speed of 81.50 mph (131.16 km/h). Also on the first lap Wal Handley riding for Rudge crashed at the 11th milestone sustaining a back injury and retired. The place on the TT course where the incident occurred was renamed Handley's Corner.

== Senior TT (500cc) ==
Rank	Rider	Team	Speed	Time
1	(Republic of Ireland) Stanley Woods	Norton	79.38 mph (127.75 km/h)	3.19.40.0
2	(Scotland) Jimmie Guthrie	Norton	78.47	3:21.59.0
3	(United Kingdom) Jimmie Simpson	Norton	78.38	3:22.13.0
4	(United Kingdom) Ernie Nott	Rudge	78.34	3:22.19.0
5	(United Kingdom) Charlie Dodson	Excelsior	77.26	3:25.09.0
6	(United Kingdom) Graham Walker	Rudge	76.36	3:27.35.0
7	(United Kingdom) John Duncan	Cotton	75.79	3:29.08.0
8	(Republic of Ireland) Henry Tyrell-Smith	Rudge	75.7	3:29.23.0
9	(Australia) Arthur Simcock	Sunbeam	72.4	3:38.56.0
10	(United Kingdom) Gilbert Emery	Sunbeam	72.36	3:39.02.0

== Junior TT (350cc) ==
Rank	Rider	Team	Speed	Time
1	(Republic of Ireland) Stanley Woods	Norton	77.16 mph (124.18 km/h)	3.25.25.0
2	(United Kingdom) Wal Handley	Rudge	76.36	3:27.25.0
3	(Republic of Ireland) Henry Tyrell-Smith	Rudge	74.02	3:34.08.0
4	(United Kingdom) Charlie Dodson	Excelsior	73.3	3:36.14.0
5	(United Kingdom) Graham Walker	Rudge	73.08	3:36.54.0
6	(United Kingdom) Les Archer	Velocette	72.05	3:40.00.0
7	(United Kingdom) Leo Davenport	New Imperial	71.94	3:40.20.0
8	(United Kingdom) Alec Bennett	Velocette	71.94	3:40.20.0
9	(United Kingdom) Sid Gleave	New Imperial	70.37	3:45.14.0
10	(United Kingdom) Jack Williams	Velocette	69.1	3:49.23.0

== Lightweight TT (250cc) ==
Rank	Rider	Team	Speed	Time
1	(United Kingdom) Leo Davenport	New Imperial	70.48 mph (113.43 km/h)	3.44.53.0
2	(United Kingdom) Graham Walker	Rudge	70.07	3:46.13.0
3	(United Kingdom) Wal Handley	Rudge	69.86	3:46.53.0
4	(United Kingdom) Tommy Spann	New Imperial	68.05	3:52.55.0
5	(United Kingdom) Chris Tattersalt	Chris Tattersal Special (CTS)	65.61	4:01.36.0
6	(United Kingdom) Jock Fairweather	Cotton	64.39	4:06.10.0
7	(South Africa) Jimmy Lind	OK-Supreme	62.47	4:13.43.0
8	(United Kingdom) Harold Warburton	Excelsior	59.43	4:26.42.0

Only 8 finishers

== Notes ==
- During practice, Jimmie Guthrie riding a Norton motorcycle struck a sheep at Glen Duff Quarry.
