= 1927 Isle of Man TT =

Annual motorcycle racing event

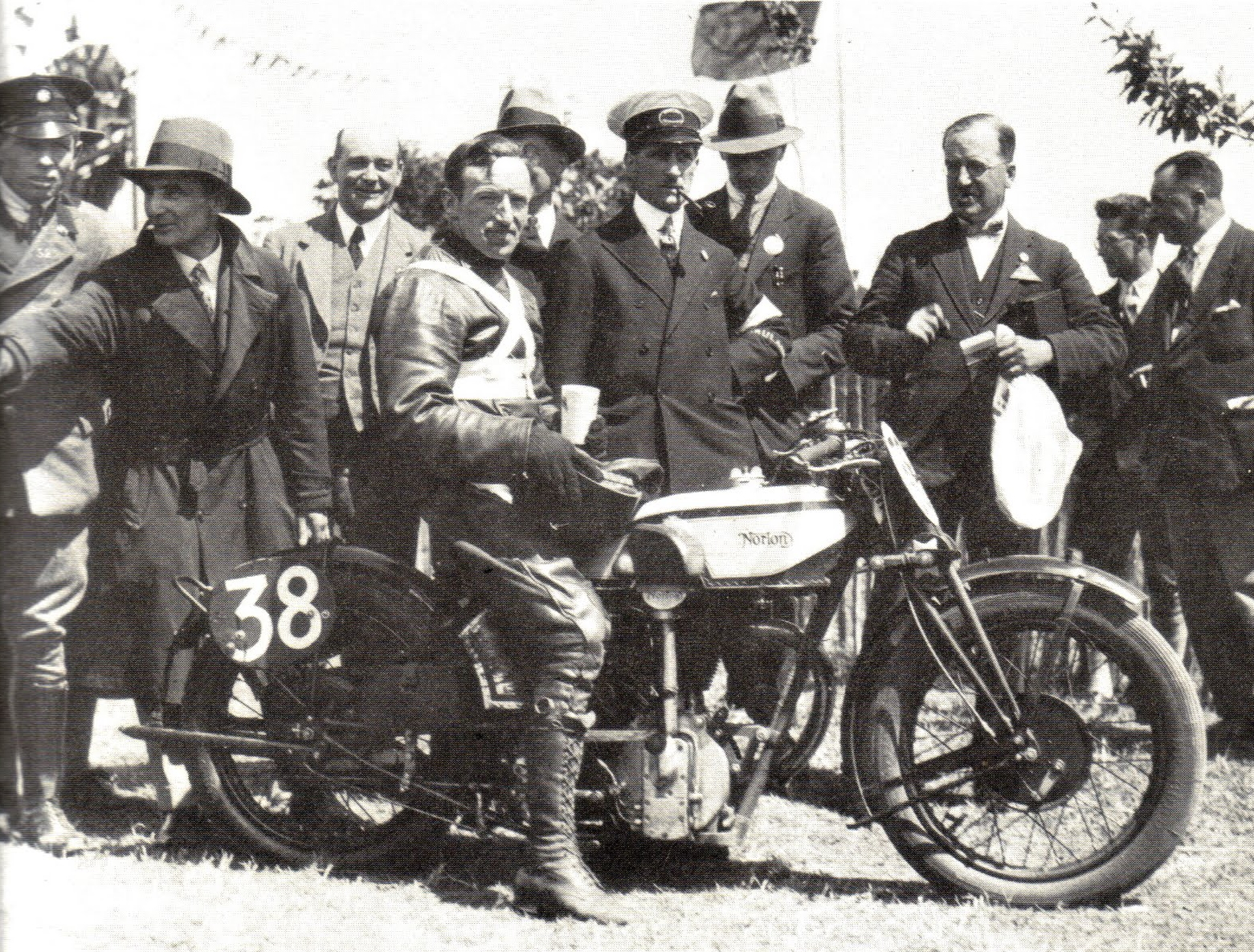
Alec Bennett and his Norton, pictured after winning the Senior TT.

The 1927 Isle of Man Tourist Trophy saw more changes occur with a fatal accident during practice to Archie Birkin, a brother to Tim Birkin of the Bentley Boys fame. The corner in Kirk Michael where the accident occurred was renamed Birkins Bend and from 1928 practice sessions were held on closed-roads. In the 1927 Junior TT Race the retirement of Wal Handley on the last-lap handed the victory to Freddie W Dixon, riding a HRD motorcycle, winning at an average speed of 67.19 mph (108.13 km/h).

In the 1927 Lightweight TT Race, Wal Handley won the 7 lap race in 4 hours 10 minutes and 23 seconds, at an average speed of 63.30 mph (101.87 km/h). A slipping clutch for Stanley Woods in the 1927 Senior TT Race, riding a new over-head camshaft Norton, allowed teammate Alec Bennett to win at an average speed of 68.41 mph (110.10 km/h).

== Senior TT (500cc) ==
| Rank | Rider | Team | Speed | Time |
|---|---|---|---|---|
| 1 | (United Kingdom) Alec Bennett | Norton | 68.41 mph (110.10 km/h) | 3.51.42 |
| 2 | (Scotland) Jimmie Guthrie | New Hudson | 66.02 | 4.00.04 |
| 3 | (United Kingdom) Tom Simister | Triumph | 65.75 | 4.01.03 |
| 4 | (United Kingdom) J W Shaw | Norton | 64.83 | 4.04.28 |
| 5 | (United Kingdom) Graham Walker | Sunbeam | 64.72 | 4.04.52 |
| 6 | (United Kingdom) Freddie Dixon | HRD | 64.32 | 4.06.26 |
| 7 | (United Kingdom) Oliver Langton | New Hudson | 64.04 | 4.07.29 |
| 8 | (United Kingdom) Charlie Dodson | Sunbeam | 63.77 | 4.08.23 |
| 9 | (United Kingdom) George Rowley | AJS | 63.74 | 4.08.40 |
| 10 | (United Kingdom) Walter Braidwood | P&M | 62.94 | 4.11.50 |

== Junior TT (350cc) ==
| Rank | Rider | Team | Speed | Time |
|---|---|---|---|---|
| 1 | (United Kingdom) Freddie Dixon | HRD | 67.19 mph (108.13 km/h) | 3.55.54 |
| 2 | (United Kingdom) Harold Willis | Velocette | 64.78 | 4.06.39 |
| 3 | (United Kingdom) Jimmie Simpson | AJS | 64.33 | 4.08.22 |
| 4 | (United Kingdom) George Reynard | Royal Enfield | 64.32 | 4.08.24 |
| 5 | (Republic of Ireland) Paddy Johnston | Cotton | 63.81 | 4.10.21 |
| 6 | (United Kingdom) Edwin Twemlow | Excelsior | 62.81 | 4.12.19 |
| 7 | (United Kingdom) Cecil Barrow | Royal Enfield | 62.4 | 4.15.23 |
| 8 | (United Kingdom) Len Cohen | AJS | 61.3 | 4.18.34 |
| 9 | (United Kingdom) Sax Pearce | DOT | 60.57 | 4.21.39 |
| 10 | (United Kingdom) George Himing | Zenith | 60.39 | 4.22.27 |

== Lightweight TT (250cc) ==
| Rank | Rider | Team | Speed | Time |
|---|---|---|---|---|
| 1 | (United Kingdom) Wal Handley | Rex-Acme | 63.3 mph | 4.10.22 |
| 2 | (Italy) Luigi Arcangeli | Moto Guzzi | 61.2 | 4.18.52 |
| 3 | (United Kingdom) Cecil Ashby | OK-Supreme | 61.1 | 4.19.24 |
| 4 | (United Kingdom) Syd Crabtree | Crabtree | 58.15 | 4.32.32 |
| 5 | (Italy) Achille Varzi | Moto Guzzi | 57.60 | 4.35.08 |
| 6 | (United Kingdom) F L Hall | New Imperial | 57.44 | 4.35.56 |
| 7 | (United Kingdom) Cecil Barrow | Royal Enfield | 57.35 | 4.36.21 |
| 8 | (United Kingdom) Sid Gleave | DOT | 57.22 | 4.37.01 |
| 9 | (United Kingdom) Geoff Davison | Rex Acme | 56.72 | 4.39.26 |
| 10 | (United Kingdom) L Higson | Montgomery | 56.41 | 4.41.00 |
