= 1933 Isle of Man TT =

Annual motorcycle racing event

The 1933 Isle of Man TT saw a double victory for Stanley Woods, who won the Junior TT Race at an average speed of 78.08 mph (125.66 km/h), heading a top three place finish for riders from the Norton marque, followed by Tim Hunt and Jimmie Guthrie.

The 1933 Lightweight TT Race was not contested by Norton and the winner was Syd Gleave riding an Excelsior motor-cycle at an average speed of 71.59 mph (115.21 km/h). Teammate Frank Longman, the winner of the 1928 Lightweight TT Race, crashed at Glentramman Corner during the same race and died later of his injuries in hospital.

The 1933 Senior TT Race gave Stanley Woods another Junior/Senior double win. The seven-lap (264.11 mile) race was completed in 3 hours, 15 minutes and 35 seconds at an average race speed of 81.04 mph (130.42 km/h) and the works Norton's taking the first four places along with Jimmie Simpson, Tim Hunt and Jimmie Guthrie.

== Senior TT (500cc) ==
7 laps (264.11 miles) Mountain Course.

Rank	Rider	Team	Speed	Time
1	(Republic of Ireland) Stanley Woods	Norton	81.04 mph (130.42 km/h)	3.15.35.0
2	(United Kingdom) Jimmie Simpson	Norton	80.41	3:17.07.0
3	(United Kingdom) Tim Hunt	Norton	80.16	3:17.43.0
4	(United Kingdom) Jimmie Guthrie	Norton	79.49	3:19.24.0
5	(United Kingdom) Ernie Nott	Rudge	77.91	3:23.27.0
6	(United Kingdom) Alec Mitchell	Velocette	76.14	3:28.10.0
7	(United Kingdom) John G. Duncan	Cotton	75.64	3:29.33.0
8	(United Kingdom) Ginger Wood	Jawa	75.39	3:30.15.0
9	(Republic of Ireland) Henry Tyrell-Smith	Rudge	75.34	3:30.22.0
10	(United Kingdom) Jack Williams	Norton	74.58	3:32.32.0

== Junior TT (350cc) ==
7 laps (264.11 miles) Mountain Course.

Rank	Rider	Team	Speed	Time
1	(Republic of Ireland) Stanley Woods	Norton	78.08 mph (125.66 km/h)	3.23.00.0
2	(United Kingdom) Tim Hunt	Norton	78.03	3:23.07.0
3	(United Kingdom) Jimmie Guthrie	Norton	76.59	3:26.56.0
4	(United Kingdom) Alec Mitchell	Velocette	75.91	3:28.48.0
5	(Republic of Ireland) Henry Tyrell-Smith	Velocette	75.46	3:30.02.0
6	(United Kingdom) Gilbert Emery	Velocette	75.41	3:30.11.0
7	(United Kingdom) Wal Handley	Velocette	74.98	3:32.23.0
8	(United Kingdom) Harold Newman	Velocette	73.23	3:36.25.0
9	(United Kingdom) Don Hall	Velocette	73.23	3:36.25.0
10	(United Kingdom) Ernie Thomas	Velocette	72.82	3:37.05.0

== Lightweight TT (250cc) ==
7 laps (264.11 miles) Mountain Course.

Rank	Rider	Team	Speed	Time
1	(United Kingdom) Sid Gleave	Excelsior	71.59 mph (115.21 km/h)	3.41.23.0
2	(United Kingdom) Charlie Dodson	New Imperial	70.85	3:43.43.0
3	(Republic of Ireland) Charles Manders	Rudge	69.17	3:49.08.0
4	(United Kingdom) Leo Davenport	New Imperial	69.01	3:49.40.0
5	(United Kingdom) Syd Crabtree	Excelsior	68.45	3:51.33.0
6	(Italy) Mario Ghersi	Moto Guzzi	69.09	3:52.46.0
7	(United Kingdom) Ted Mellors	New Imperial	67.08	3:53.47.0
8	(United Kingdom) Les Martin	Rudge	66.82	3:53.49.0
9	(United Kingdom) Colin Taylor	OK-Supreme	66.41	3:58.45.0
10	(United Kingdom) Jock Fairweather	Cotton	66.39	3:58.49.0
