= Henry Tyrell-Smith =

Irish motorcycle racer

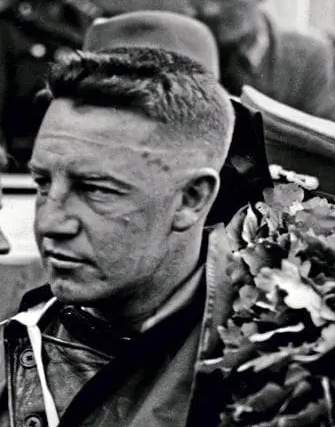
- Nationality: Irish
- Born: 1907
- Died: 1982 (aged 74–75)
Motorcycle racing career statistics
Isle of Man TT career
TTs contested	13 (1927–1939)
TT wins	1
First TT win	1930 Junior TT
Last TT win	1930 Junior TT
TT podiums	8

Henry George Tyrell-Smith (1907–1982) was an Irish motorcycle road racer. He was born in Co Dublin and studied at Trinity College, Dublin for a B.A. And B.A.I.degree. He raced at the Isle of Man TT from 1927 to 1939, and between 1929 and 1936, competed in the German Grand Prix. He also raced in The Swedish Grand Prix in Saxtorp 1933–36.

== Background ==
Tyrell-Smith's first motorcycle was an ex War Department Douglas. From 1924 to 1929, he studied for engineering degree at Trinity College Dublin. From 1936 to 1939, he worked for the Experimental Department at Excelsior motorcycles. From 1939 to 1942, he was with the Bristol Aeroplane Co working on single-cylinder test stands. In 1942, he received a direct officer commission for REME. He was with the Workshop Office for Guards Armoured Division during D-Day landings and Normandy. In 1945, he was promoted to major as a workshop control officer in an engine repair shop at Volkswagen in Wolfsburg. After the war, he worked in the Experimental Department for Triumph Motorcycles.

== Motorcycle racing career ==
Tyrell-Smith started out on a Douglas, and finished second in the 1926 Leinster 200. He rode a Triumph in the 1927 Isle of Man TT, and by the next year rode for Rudge, and continued to do so until 1935.

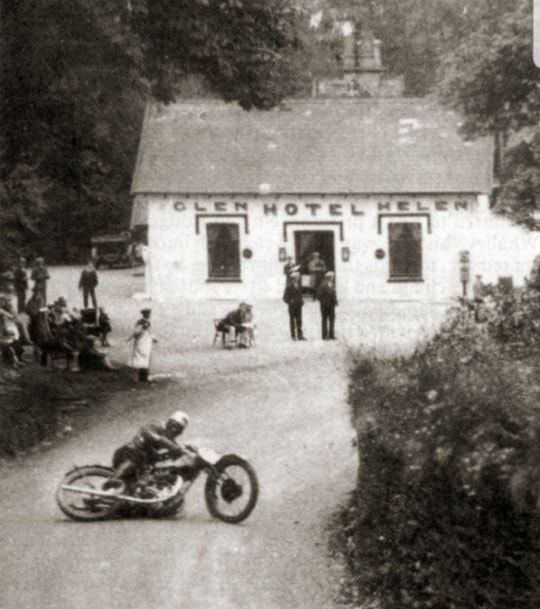
Henry Tyrell-Smith crashing at Glen Helen during the 1929 Senior TT

In the 1929 IOM Senior TT, Tyrell-Smith began in the lead, and by the fourth lap was more than three minutes ahead. Then he crashed at Glen Helen, allowing a number of bikes to pass before he could rejoin, and this put Tim Hunt, on a Norton, in front. When Hunt had problems, Sunbeam's Charlie Dodson moved into the lead. Interest then began to focus on Tyrell-Smith, who, riding furiously, was making up time on the leaders. Dodson won, with his teammate Alec Bennett more than four minutes behind, and Tyrell-Smith only 50 seconds behind him, taking third. When he was examined after the race, it was found that he had leg injuries and three cracked ribs. The Rudge team of those years consisted of competition manager Graham Walker, with Ernie Nott, and H.G. Tyrell Smith.

Tyrell-Smith won the 1930 500cc European Championship for Rudge. In 1933, he rode an OK-Supreme in the Lightweight. In 1934, he rode an AJS in the Senior, and the 1935 Junior, having his last TT ride for Rudge in the 1935 Senior. From 1936 to 1939, he rode for Excelsior. The bike Tyrell-Smith rode in the 1936 Lightweight was a four-valve OHC radial head Excelsior with two carburettors. He finished second and went on to win the 250 cc European Championship. In the late 1930s, he worked for Excelsior motorcycle company and when the war broke out, joined the British Army and served in the D-Day landings with the Royal Electrical and Mechanical Engineers (REME). After the war, a career followed with Girling Ltd as sales engineer supplying suspension units to the British Motorcycle industry

In the 1960s, Tyrell-Smith was regularly seen at the Isle of Man TT races accompanying the Girling racing department in his capacity as representative to the motorcycle industry but also helping to provide the support to the sport that he loved. "Tyrell" took retirement in 1972. On 30 September 1956, the first Coventry Parade – then known as the Coventry–Birmingham–Coventry Veteran Motorcycle Run – was held. There were 61 entries, including "H.G. Tyrrell (sic.) Smith, successful TT rider of the 20s and 30s"

== Isle of Man TT Race career ==
Year	Placing	Race	Motorcycle	Average Speed
1927	13th	Senior TT	Triumph	60.99 mph
1928	4th	Senior TT	Rudge	60.52 mph
1929	3rd	Senior TT	Rudge	70.25 mph
1930	6th	Senior TT	Rudge	71.11 mph
1930	1st	Junior TT	Rudge	71.08 mph
1931	2nd	Lightweight TT	Rudge	68.25 mph
1932	8th	Senior TT	Rudge	75.70 mph
1932	3rd	Junior TT	Rudge	74.02 mph
1933	9th	Senior TT	Rudge	75.34 mph
1933	5th	Junior TT	Rudge	75.46 mph
1933	11th	Lightweight TT	OK-Supreme	65.62 mph
1934	7th	Senior TT	AJS	70.56 mph
1935	10th	Junior TT	AJS	75.21 mph
1935	2nd	Lightweight TT	Rudge	70.67 mph
1936	2nd	Lightweight TT	Excelsior	72.51 mph
1937	7th	Junior TT	Excelsior	77.25 mph
1938	3rd	Lightweight	Excelsior	73.62 mph
1938	13th	Junior TT	Excelsior	76.69 mph
1939	3rd	Lightweight TT	Excelsior	71.91 mph

- DNF in 1931 Junior and Senior.
- DNF in 1936 Junior (Excelsior)- Retired Lap 3 at Creg-ny-Baa.
- DNF in 1937 Lightweight(Excelsior) – Retired Lap 6 at Creg-ny-Baa with broken connecting-rod.
- DNF in 1939 Senior.

TT Career Summary
Finishing Position	1	2	3	4	5	6	7	8	9	10	11	12	13	DNF
Number of times	1	3	4	1	1	1	2	1	1	1	1	1	2	6

=== German Motorcycle GP ===
- In 1929 Henry Tyrell-Smith won the 500 cc class at the German motorcycle Grand Prix
- In 1931 the 350 cc Grand Prix
- In 1934 the 250 cc Grand Prix
- In 1936 the 250 cc Grand Prix

=== Other race wins ===
- 1931
- 250cc Dutch Grand Prix
- 1932
- 350cc Ulster Grand Prix – Rudge 77.89 mph
- 350cc Brooklands Grand Prix
- 1933
- 500cc Leinster 200
- 1934
- 250cc Belgium Grand Prix
- 1936
- 350cc Dublin 100
- 1937
- 350cc Dublin 100
- 250cc Leinster 200
- 1938
- 250cc North West 200

Sporting positions
Preceded by Percy Hunt	500cc Motorcycle European Champion; 1930	Succeeded by Percy Hunt
Preceded by Arthur Geiß	250cc Motorcycle European Champion; 1936	Succeeded by Omobono Tenni
