= 1930 Isle of Man TT =

Annual motorcycle racing event

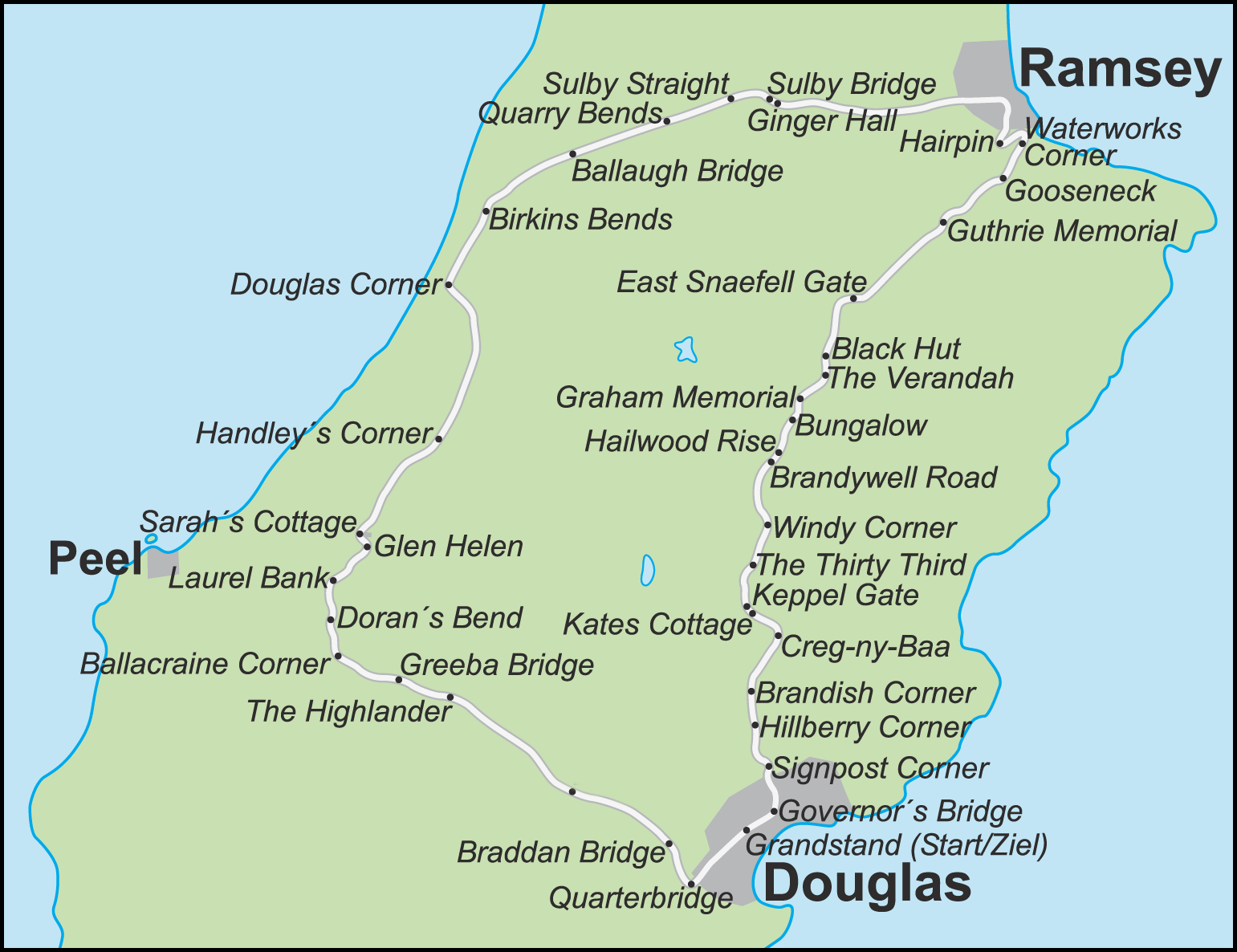
Map showing the Isle of Man TT Course

The 1930 Isle of Man Tourist Trophy was dominated by the Rudge marque. Despite problems in practice for Rudge and the new George Hicks designed four-valve over-head valve motor-cycles the 1930 Junior TT was a closely contested race. At the end of the first lap, Charlie Dodson riding for Sunbeam led the Rudge of H. G. Tyrell Smith by only 4 seconds. On lap 2, a dead-heat was posted between Dodson and Tyrell Smith both completing the Snaefell mountain course in 1 hour, 3 minutes and 32 seconds. At Kirk Michael on lap 3, Charlie Dodson retires with valve problems, leaving Tyrell Smith to win the 7 lap race at an average speed of 71.08 mph (114.39 km/h) from Rudge team-mates Ernie Nott and Graham Walker.

The 1930 Lightweight TT was initially led by the South African rider Joe Sarkis riding an OK-Supreme motor-cycle and on lap 1 set a time of 33 minutes and 55 seconds to lead Wal Handley riding for Rex-Acme motor-cycles by 39 seconds. At Union Mills on lap 2, Joe Sarkis stops to make adjustments and Wal Handley retires with oil-tank problems at Braddan Bridge. This hands the lead to Jimmie Guthrie riding an AJS motor-cycle and leads Joe Sarkis by 21 seconds on lap 3. At the East Mountain Gate on lap 4, Joe Sarkis stops a second time and retires and the 1930 Lightweight TT Race provided a first-time win for Jimmie Guthrie riding an AJS motor-cycle in 4 hours, 4 minutes and 56 seconds at average race speed of 64.71 mph (104.14 km/h).

The 1930 Senior TT Race was again a closely contested race between Rudge and the other manufacturers and also Wal Handley and Tyrell Smith. This time on the first lap Wal Handley led Tyrell Smith also riding for the Rudge marque by 39 seconds. Despite the poor weather conditions and heavy rain in the last two laps, the 1930 Senior TT Race was again won by Rudge motor-cycles with Wal Handley becoming the first TT rider to win in all three major TT Race classes at an average race speed of 74.24 mph (119.48 km/h) and having to hold top-gear in place with his toe. Also, Wal Handley set a new overall lap record of 29 minutes and 41 seconds an average speed of 76.28 mph (122.76 km/h), the first lap under 30 minutes of the Snaefell mountain course.

== Senior TT (500cc) ==
20 June 1930 – 7 laps (264.11 miles) Mountain Course.

Rank	Rider	Team	Speed	Time
1	(United Kingdom) Wal Handley	Rudge	74.24 mph (119.48 km/h)	3.33.30.0
2	(United Kingdom) Graham Walker	Rudge	74.1	3.36.49.0
3	(United Kingdom) Jimmie Simpson	Norton	73.7	3.38.01.0
4	(United Kingdom) Charlie Dodson	Sunbeam	71.99	3.40.11.0
5	(United Kingdom) Tom Frederick	Sunbeam	71.43	3.41.53.0
6	(Republic of Ireland) H. G. Tyrell Smith	Rudge	71.11	3.42.54.0
7	(United Kingdom) Ernie Nott	Rudge	70.85	3.43.42.0
8	(United Kingdom) Vic Brittain	Sunbeam	68.7	3.50.43.0
9	(South Africa) J G Lind	AJS	67.56	3.54.36.0
10	(United Kingdom) J G Duncan	Raleigh	66.21	3.59.23.0

== Junior TT (350cc) ==
16 June 1930 – 7 laps (264.11 miles) Mountain Course.

Rank	Rider	Team	Speed	Time
1	(Republic of Ireland) H. G. Tyrell Smith	Rudge	71.08 mph (114.39 km/h)	3.43.00.0
2	(United Kingdom) Ernie Nott	Rudge	70.89	3.43.35.0
3	(United Kingdom) Graham Walker	Rudge	70.77	3.43.58.0
4	(United Kingdom) D Hall	Velocette	70.44	3.45.00.0
5	(United Kingdom) C J Williams	Raleigh	69.82	3.47.01.0
6	(Republic of Ireland) Stanley Woods	Norton	69.69	3.47.26.0
7	(United Kingdom) A G Mitchell	Velocette	67.9	3.53.25.0
8	(United Kingdom) George Himing	AJS	67.73	3.54.01.0
9	(United Kingdom) Tim Hunt	Norton	67.24	3.55.43.0
10	(United Kingdom) Leo Davenport	AJS	67.01	3.56.32.0

== Lightweight TT (250cc) ==
18 June 1930 – 7 laps (264.11 miles) Mountain Course.

Rank	Rider	Team	Speed	Time
1	(Scotland) Jimmie Guthrie	AJS	64.71 mph (104.14 km/h)	4.04.56.0
2	(Republic of Ireland) C. W. Johnston	OK-Supreme	64.07	4.07.22.0
3	(United Kingdom) C S Barrow	OK-Supreme	63.54	4.09.27.0
4	(United Kingdom) Sid Gleave	SGS	63.39	4.10.02.0
5	(United Kingdom) J G Lind	AJS	63.24	4.10.46.0
6	(United Kingdom) Ted Mellors	New Imperial	62.6	4.11.59.0
7	(United Kingdom) Edwin Twemlow	Cotton	62.26	4.14.35.0
8	(United Kingdom) Chris Tattersall	SGS	61.17	4.19.06.0
9	(United Kingdom) C E Needham	Rex-Acme	60.91	4.20.14.0
10	(United Kingdom) Vic C Anstice	Excelsior	60.1	4.21.56.

== Notes ==
- During practice, F C Isaacs from Jamaica, riding a Norton, suffers cut toes after hitting the Braddan War Memorial. A flock of sheep at the 13th Milestone causes some problems to Jimmie Simpson riding a Norton.
- The Japanese rider Kenzo Tada crashes his Velocette into Ballaugh Bridge and suffers nothing more than bent handlebars.
- The Italian rider Pietro Ghersi is injured and taken to hospital after crashing at the Gooseneck during practice, and is accompanied back to Italy by Achille Varzi.
- The High Bailiff fines Wal Handley and Ernie Nott £1 each for not having an efficient exhaust silencer on their motor-cycles.
- On lap 1 of the 1930 Junior TT Race, Percy Coleman riding a Royal Enfield retires after a crash at the 33rd Milestone. The Egyptian rider M. Sabet riding a Sunbeam stops at Governor's Bridge with spark-plug problems. At Hillberry, C.S. Barrow riding a Levis retires after a crash. At Union Mills on lap 2, Frank Longman riding an Excelsior stops with gear-box problems, but continues after a delay. At the TT Grandstand on lap 3, J.G. Lynd riding a Velocette is delayed with a magneto problem. Charlie Dodson riding a Sunbeam retires at Kirk Michael with value spring problems. As the competitors complete their 3rd lap, Frank Longman completes his 2nd lap with Jimmie Simpson as a pillion passenger. At the Quarterbridge on lap 3, Somervile-Sikes riding a Velocette slips off but continues and J. Hanson, also riding a Velocette, at Governor's Bridge. At the Quarterbridge on lap 5, S. Barwell riding an Excelsior crashes and breaks his left arm. Also, Tim Hunt riding a Norton slips off on melting tar at the Quarterbridge but continues. The Belgian rider J. Fondu crashes his Mondial at Creg-ny-Baa. On lap 6, "Digger" Simcock retires his Sunbeam at Greeba with engine problems.
- For the 1930 Lightweight TT Race, Freddie Hicks is posted as a non-starter. At Union Mills on lap 1, Syd Crabtree riding an Excelsior retires with a broken exhaust valve and L.H.Davenport riding an AJS at the Quarterbridge with engine problems. At Kirk Michael on lap 2, Frank Longman riding an OK Supreme retires with engine failure and Don Hall riding an OK Supreme retires at Ballaugh. The Jamaican rider A. Ennevor, riding a Velocette, falls on Creg Willey's Hill on lap 3 and continues with a split lip, but later retires at the TT Grandstand. The Swiss rider F. Franconi, riding a Universal, crashes at Glen Helen.
- In the 1930 Senior TT Race, the Italian rider Achille Varzi is posted as a non-starter. On lap 1, A. Tyler, riding a Raleigh, crashes at the Quarterbridge and retires. In Ramsey on lap 1 Edwin Twemlow, riding for Cotton, retires with clutch failure. At the Ramsey Hairpin, Leo Davenport, riding an AJS, retires with a gear-box problem. At the Creg-ny-Baa, W. Kitchen, riding a Scott, slips off but continues. On lap 2, Jimmie Guthrie riding for AJS is reported as touring at Creg-ny-Baa and pushes in from Hillberry to retire. On lap 3, J. Duncan riding a Raleigh motor-cycle collides with the Union Mills Post Office and loses 5 minutes. At Braddan Bridge, W. L. Birch riding an Excelsior collides with a Flag Marshal and retires, and F. V. Rushton riding a Sunbeam motor-cycle crashes at Laurel Bank. On lap 5, F.C. Isaacs riding a Norton, crashes into the telephone box at the Creg-ny-Baa. At the Gooseneck, Tim Hunt retires with engine problems with his Norton and C.J. Williams riding a Raleigh crashes and suffers a broken leg.
