= 1936 Isle of Man TT =

Annual motorcycle racing event

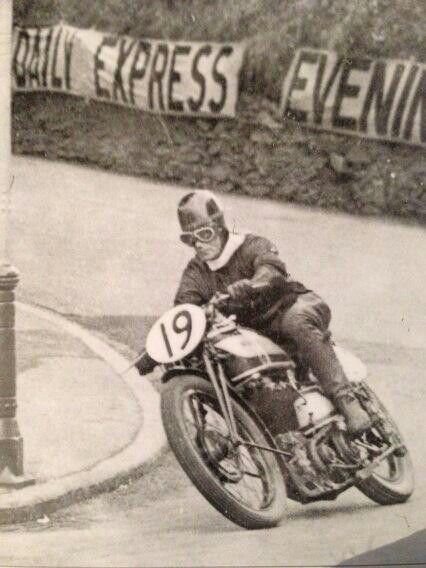
Senior TT winner Jimmie Guthrie at Quarterbridge

The 1936 Isle of Man Tourist Trophy saw Norton rider Jimmie Guthrie win the Senior, and come fifth in the Junior. The Junior was won by Freddie Frith in his first year on the Norton team, and the Lightweight was won by Bob Foster on a New Imperial.

Following on from the dramatic win by Stanley Woods in the 1935 Senior TT Race, the 1936 Junior TT Race proved to be highly controversial and was marred by disqualification and protest. As Moto Guzzi were involved in war production for the crisis in Abyssinia, Stanley Woods rode for Velocette in the 1936 Junior TT but retired at Sulby on lap 1 with engine problems. After leading for five laps, Jimmie Guthrie was forced to stop between Hillberry and Signpost Corner to replace the drive chain. Although Jimmie Guthrie continued in 2nd place the lead passed to Norton team-mate Freddie Frith who had joined the team after winning the 1935 Junior Manx Grand Prix. At Parliament Square in Ramsey on lap 6, Jimmie Guthrie was 'black-flagged' for receiving outside assistance and disqualified. Guthrie denied the charge, however, and continued the race to finish in fifth place which was won by Freddie Frith to record his first Isle of Man TT win at an average race speed of 80.14 mph (128.97 km/h). The Norton race team protested the disqualification and Jimmie Guthrie was posted in 5th place in the final race classification and was awarded 2nd place prize money.

In the Senior TT race Harold Daniell and George Rowley rode supercharged AJS V4s, but despite their high top speed, the bikes lacked acceleration. Both riders retired due to mechanical problems.

The 1936 Lightweight TT Race was held after being delayed for a day because of mist and fog on the Mountain Course. The 1936 Lightweight Race proved to be closely contested by Bob Foster riding for New Imperial and Stanley Woods riding the 3 cylinder supercharged 250 cc DKW who retired on lap 7 after stopping to change a spark-plug. The 1936 Lightweight Race was won by Bob Foster at an average race speed of 74.28 mph (119.54 km/h) from Tyrell Smith riding for Excelsior in 2nd place and A.Geiss in 3rd place riding a DKW motorcycle.

== Senior TT (500 cc) ==
19 June 1936 – 7 laps (264.11 miles) Mountain Course.

Rank	Rider	Team	Speed	Time
1	(United Kingdom) Jimmie Guthrie	Norton	85.8 mph (138.1 km/h)	3.04.43.0
2	(Republic of Ireland) Stanley Woods	Velocette	85.66	3:05.01.0
3	(United Kingdom) Freddie Frith	Norton	84.49	3:07.23.0
4	(United Kingdom) John H. White	Norton	83.64	3:09.29.0
5	(United Kingdom) Noel Pope	Norton	77.59	3:24.16.0
6	(New Zealand) Chas Goldberg	Velocette	76.22	3:27.56.0
7	(United Kingdom) Billy Tiffen Jnr	Velocette	74.88	3:31.39.0
8	(United Kingdom) Jock West	Vincent-HRD	74.21	3:33.33.0
9	(South Africa) Johnny Galway	Norton	73.07	3:36.52.0
10	(United Kingdom) Bill Beevers	Norton	71.80	3:40.43.0

== Junior TT (350 cc) ==
16 June 1936 – 7 laps (264.11 miles) Mountain Course.

Rank	Rider	Team	Speed	Time
1	(United Kingdom) Freddie Frith	Norton	80.14 mph (128.97 km/h)	3.17.46.0
2	(United Kingdom) John H. White	Norton	77.92	3:23.16.0
3	(United Kingdom) Ted Mellors	Velocette	77.91	3:23.25.0
4	(United Kingdom) Ernie Thomas	Velocette	76.8	3:26.22.0
5	(United Kingdom) Jimmie Guthrie	Norton	76.11	3:28.13.0
6	(Nazi Germany) Oskar Steinbach	NSU	75.63	3:29.33.0
7	(Nazi Germany) Heiner Fleischmann	NSU	75.53	3:29.50.0
8	(United Kingdom) Don Hall	Norton	75.37	3:30.17.0
9	(United Kingdom) Harold Daniell	AJS	74.61	3:32.25.0
10	(United Kingdom) George Rowley	AJS	73.85	3:34.36.0

== Lightweight TT (250 cc) ==
18 June 1936 – 7 laps (264.11 miles) Mountain Course.

Rank	Rider	Team	Speed	Time
1	(United Kingdom) Bob Foster	New Imperial	74.28 mph (119.54 km/h)	3.33.22.0
2	(Republic of Ireland) Henry Tyrell-Smith	Excelsior	72.51	3:38.34.0
3	(Nazi Germany) Arthur Geiß	DKW	72.49	3:38.37.0
4	(United Kingdom) Jock Fairweather	Cotton	70.16	3:45.53.0
5	(Republic of Ireland) Charlie Manders	Excelsior	69.57	3:47.48.0
6	(United Kingdom) Walter Corfield	Excelsior	68.97	3:49.47.0
7	(United Kingdom) Harold Hartley	Rudge	67.59	3:54.29.0
8	(Denmark) Svend Aage Sørensen	Excelsior	67.13	3:56.04.0
9	(United Kingdom) Harry Lamacraft	Excelsior	66.77	3:57.21.0
10	(South Africa) Johnny Galway	Excelsior	66.57	3:58.04.0

== Notes ==
- Wal Handley crashed a Riley belonging to Freddie Dixon at Brooklands during the British Empire Trophy and broke an arm.
- Prize money for the 1936 Senior TT Race was 1st place £120, 2nd place £80 and 3rd place £70. For the 1936 Junior TT and Lightweight TT Races it was 1st place £100, 2nd place £60 and 3rd place £50.
- During the 1936 Junior TT Race, Noel Christmas retired at the TT Grandstand and H.G. Tyrell Smith at Creg-na-Baa with engine problems on lap 2. On lap 6, E.R. Thomas in 2nd place slipped off at the Quarterbridge. He continued, but stopped on the Ballahutchin Hill to straighten handlebars and footrest, but was eventually black-flagged.
- The fastest lap for the 1936 Junior TT Race was set by Freddie Frith in 27 minutes and 38 seconds at an average speed of 81.94 mph (131.87 km/h).
- During lap 2 of the 1936 Lightweight TT Race, O. Steinbach riding for DKW stopped at Ballaugh with engine problems and L.G. Martin riding a Cotton motorcycle crashed at Sulby.
- The fastest lap for the 1936 Lightweight TT Race was set by Stanley Woods in 29 minutes and 43 seconds at an average speed of 76.20 mph (122.63 km/h).
