= 1929 Isle of Man TT =

Annual motorcycle racing event

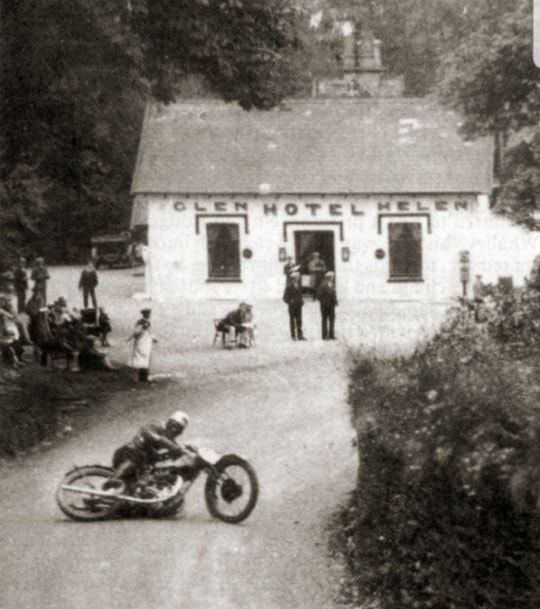
Henry Tyrell-Smith crashing out of the lead of the Senior TT at Glen Helen. He rejoined to finish 3rd.

For the 1929 Isle of Man TT races the Velocette marque had high expectations of another win in the Junior TT Race. Despite the early lead of Alec Bennett, riding a Velocette, and Wal Handley, now riding an AJS motor-cycle, it was Freddie Hicks that led from the third lap and won the 1929 Junior TT Race at a record average speed of 69.71 mph (112.19 km/h) and setting a new race lap record of 31 minutes and 5 seconds an average speed of 70.95 mph (114.18 km/h). Two times European motorcycle champion Cecil Ashby suffered serious injuries during the race, and died at Noble's Hospital several hours later.

As with 1928 TT Race meeting the 1929 Lightweight TT Race produced another first-time winner with Syd Crabtree on an Excelsior motor-cycle. The 1929 Lightweight TT Race was led for 5 laps by Pietro Ghersi on a Motor Guzzi competing in his first TT race since the disqualification in the Guzzi Incident of 1926. Despite Pietro Ghersi setting the fastest lap at an average speed of 66.63 mph (107.23 km/h), engine failure gave the win to Syd Crabtree.

During the 1929 Senior TT Race a number of riders crashed at Greeba Castle after Wal Handley clipped the hedge and crashed. This included Jimmy Simpson, Jack Amott riding for Rudge and Doug Lamb who later died of his injuries at Noble's Hospital. The early leader of the 1929 Senior TT Race was H. G. Tyrell Smith riding a Rudge but crashed on 3 lap at Glen Helen. Despite cracked ribs, Tyrell Smith continued but could not match the pace of the new leader Tim Hunt riding a Norton motor-cycle. From lap 5 Charlie Dodson riding a Sunbeam replaced Tim Hunt as the leader, setting an overall lap record of 30 minutes and 47 seconds, for an average of 73.55 mph (118.37 km/h). In better weather conditions than 1928 Charlie Dodson completed a Senior TT double by winning the 7 lap (264.11 miles) 1929 Senior TT Race in 3 hours, 39 minutes and 59 seconds at an average speed of 72.05 mph (115.95 km/h).

== Junior TT (350cc) ==
7 laps (264.11 miles) Mountain Course.

Rank	Rider	Team	Speed	Time
1	(United Kingdom) Freddie Hicks	Velocette	69.71 mph (112.19 km/h)	3.47.23.0
2	(United Kingdom) Wal Handley	AJS	69.29	3:48.45.0
3	(United Kingdom) Alec Bennett	Velocette	69.00	3:49.52.0
4	(United Kingdom) Charlie Dodson	Sunbeam	67.56	3:54.37.0
5	(United Kingdom) Tom Simister	Velocette	67.07	3:56.20.0
6	(United Kingdom) Don Hall	Velocette	77.34	3:57.06.0
7	(United Kingdom) Syd Crabtree	Velocette	64.94	4:00.22.0
8	(United Kingdom) Jason Burrows	DOT	65.12	4:03.23.0
9	(United Kingdom) Kenneth Twemlow	DOT	64.83	4:04.30.0
10	(United Kingdom) Jimmy Shaw	Velocette	64.63	4:05.15.0

== Lightweight TT (250cc) ==
7 laps (264.11 miles) Mountain Course.

Rank	Rider	Team	Speed	Time
1	(United Kingdom) Syd Crabtree	Excelsior	63.87	4.08.10.0
2	(United Kingdom) Kenneth Twemlow	DOT	62.25	4:13.25.0
3	(United Kingdom) Frank Longman	OK-Supreme	61.78	4:16.33.0
4	(South Africa) Joe Sarkis	OK-Supreme	61.59	4:17.20.0
5	(Republic of Ireland) Paddy Johnston	Cotton	61.29	4:18.37.0
6	(United Kingdom) Sidney Jackson	Montgomery	59.60	4:25.56.0
7	(United Kingdom) Edwin Twemlow	DOT	59.00	4:28.37.0
8	(United Kingdom) Jim Whalley	Cotton	58.88	4:29.11.0
9	(United Kingdom) Jimmy Shaw	OK-Supreme	58.77	4:29.41.0
10	(United Kingdom) Harry Lester	S.O.S.	58.70	4:38.00.0

== Senior TT (500cc) ==
7 laps (264.11 miles) Mountain Course.

Rank	Rider	Team	Speed	Time
1	(United Kingdom) Charlie Dodson	Sunbeam	72.05 mph (115.95 km/h)	3.39.59.0
2	(United Kingdom) Alec Bennett	Sunbeam	70.51	3:44.07.0
3	(Republic of Ireland) Henry Tyrell-Smith	Rudge	70.25	3:45.37.0
4	(United Kingdom) Tim Hunt	Norton	70.16	3:45.54.0
5	(United Kingdom) Ernie Nott	Rudge	69.80	3:47.04.0
6	(United Kingdom) Freddie Hicks	Velocette	69.26	3:48.51.0
7	(Australia) Arthur Simcock	Sunbeam	68.90	3:50.02.0
8	(Republic of Ireland) Paddy Johnston	Cotton	67.68	3:53.56.0
9	(United Kingdom) Edwin Twemlow	DOT	66.92	3:34.21.0
10	(United Kingdom) Sidney Jackson	Montgomery	66.23	3:59.19.0
