= 1935 Isle of Man TT =

Annual motorcycle racing event

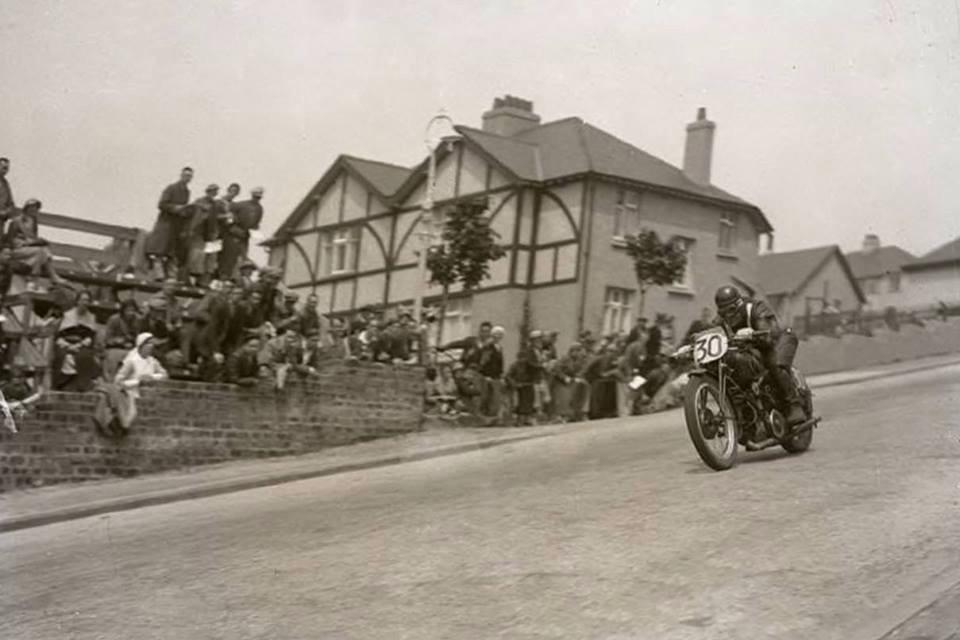
1935 Senior TT winner Stanley Woods going through Bray Hill

For the 1935 Isle of Man Tourist Trophy, Stanley Woods provided another surprise by moving again, from Husqvarna to Moto Guzzi.

The 1935 Junior TT Race provided a Junior TT double win for Jimmie Guthrie at an average race speed of 79.14 mph (127.36 km/h) and Norton with a 1-2-3 race win with Walter Rusk and "Crasher" White filling 2nd and 3rd places.

The 1935 Lightweight TT Race was a debut event for the Italian Omobono Tenni. It was team-mate Stanley Woods that led the 1935 Lightweight TT Race from start-to-finish at an average race speed of 71.56 mph (115.16 km/h) followed by Tyrell Smith and Ernie Nott, both riding for Rudge motorcycles.

The 1935 Senior TT Race was postponed to the next day due to poor weather. Despite the delay, the race produced one of the most dramatic TT races. The race was led away by Jimmie Guthrie at number 1 while Stanley Woods starting at number 30 had a 15-minute wait. By the last lap of the 1935 Senior TT Race, Jimmie Guthrie had built up a lead of 26 seconds.

As the Moto Guzzi pit-attendants made preparations for Stanley Woods to refuel on the last lap, the Norton pit-crew signalled to Guthrie to easy the pace on the last lap. Stanley Woods riding for Moto Guzzi went straight through the TT Grandstand area without stopping on the last lap and set a new overall lap record of 26 minutes and 10 seconds at an average speed of 86.53 mph (139.26 km/h). Despite the Norton team telephoning the signal station at Ramsey on the last lap to indicate to Jimmie Guthrie to speed-up the pace, Stanley Woods won the 1935 Senior TT Race by 4 seconds from Jimmie Guthrie in 3 hours, 7 minutes and 10 seconds at an average speed of 84.68 mph (136.28 km/h).

== Senior TT (500cc) ==
Saturday 22 June 1935 – 7 laps (264.11 miles) Mountain Course.

Rank	Rider	Team	Speed	Time
1	(Republic of Ireland) Stanley Woods	Moto Guzzi	84.68 mph (136.28 km/h)	3.07.10.0
2	(Scotland) Jimmie Guthrie	Norton	84.65	3:07.14.0
3	(United Kingdom) Walter Rusk	Norton	83.53	3:09.45.0
4	(United Kingdom) John G. Duncan	Norton	80.54	3:16.48.0
5	(Nazi Germany) Oskar Steinbach	NSU	78.02	3:23.09.0
6	(United Kingdom) Ted Mellors	NSU	75.34	3:30.32.0
7	(United Kingdom) Jack Williams	Vincent-HRD	75.26	3:30.26.0
8	(United Kingdom) Cecil Barrow	Royal Enfield	74.62	3:32.25.0
9	(United Kingdom) Noel Christmas	Vincent-HRD	73.94	3:34.21.0
10	(United Kingdom) Harry Lamacraft	Velocette	73.16	3:36.39.0

== Junior TT (350cc) ==
Monday 17 June 1935 – 7 laps (264.11 miles) Mountain Course.

Rank	Rider	Team	Speed	Time
1	(Scotland) Jimmie Guthrie	Norton	79.14 mph (127.36 km/h)	3.20.16.0
2	(United Kingdom) Walter Rusk	Norton	78.71	3:21.22.0
3	(United Kingdom) John H. White	Norton	78.19	3:22.42.0
4	(United Kingdom) Doug Pirie	Velocette	77.69	3:24.01.0
5	(United Kingdom) Ernie Nott	Velocette	77.57	3:24.20.0
6	(United Kingdom) Ernie Thomas	Velocette	77.34	3:24.57.0
7	(United Kingdom) John G. Duncan	Norton	76.55	3:27.03.0
8	(United Kingdom) Harold Daniell	AJS	76.25	3:27.52.0
9	(United Kingdom) Les Archer	Velocette	76.24	3:27.54.0
10	(Republic of Ireland) Henry Tyrell-Smith	AJS	75.21	3:30.45.0

== Lightweight TT (250cc) ==
Wednesday 19 June 1935 – 7 laps (264.11 miles) Mountain Course.

Rank	Rider	Team	Speed	Time
1	(Republic of Ireland) Stanley Woods	Moto Guzzi	71.56 mph (115.16 km/h)	3.41.29.0
2	(Republic of Ireland) Henry Tyrell-Smith	Rudge	70.67	3:44.17.0
3	(United Kingdom) Ernie Nott	Rudge	69.37	3:48.30.0
4	(United Kingdom) Ginger Wood	New Imperial	69.08	3:49.27.0
5	(United Kingdom) Jack Williams	Rudge	65.58	4:01.42.0
6	(Republic of Ireland) Charlie Manders	Excelsior	64.67	4:05.06.0
7	(Nazi Germany) Arthur Geiß	DKW	64.27	4:06.36.0
8	(United Kingdom) Gordon Burney	Moto Guzzi	63.32	4:10.20.0
9	(United Kingdom) Leslie Hill	Rudge	61.95	4:15.51.0
10	(United Kingdom) Stan Smith	Excelsior	60.46	4:22.10.0

== Notes ==
- Stanley Woods returned to racing in the Isle of Man after breaking a scaphoid bone in his wrist after crashing a 500 Husqvarna on lap 1 of the 1934 Dutch TT Race.
- Major alterations to the Snaefell mountain course were carried out for the 1935 TT Races. This included the removal of the hump-backed bridge at Ballig. The road work was completed for the Manx Grand Prix in September 1935. Road widening occurred on the Mountain Course at the Highlander, Laurel Bank, Glen Helen (between the Old Quarry and Brew's Restaurant) and at Brandywell with the removal of the Beinn-y-Phott sheep-gate.
- A warm-up period was introduced for the first time before each race.
- Associated Talking Pictures used the 1935 TT Races for the backdrop for the motion picture No Limit starring George Formby, who dreams of riding a Shuttleworth Snap motorcycle in the Isle of Man TT Races. Filming started on 15 June 1935 with co-star Florence Desmond using Douglas Beach, White City, Douglas Head Road, the Palace Ballrooms and the Douglas Camera Obscura.
- Royal Enfield entered a 500 cc four valve racing model for the Senior TT 1935. This was the last TT Royal Enfield entered.
- During practice N. Cook riding an Excelsior crashed at Keppel Gate and George Rowley riding for AJS at Signpost Corner. An injury to a thumb caused by replacing a drive-chain at Sulby caused Wal Handley to withdraw from the 1935 TT Races.
- On lap 3 of the 1935 Junior Race, John Angus Macdonald riding a Norton motorcycle crashed at Union Mills and was killed.
- The 1935 Lightweight Race was held in poor weather conditions and Omobono Tenni crashed in the mist at the 32nd Milestone on the 5th lap. Although Tenni continued, he again crashed at Creg-ny-Baa, collided with a flag-marshal and suffered a fractured vertebra. Also, during lap 5 of the 1935 Lightweight Race, Doug Pirie crashed at the 33rd Milestone and was killed.
- The 1935 Senior TT Races were postponed from Friday 21 June 1935 to the following day. Interested visitors to the 1935 Senior Race included Florence Desmond, the Duke of Richmond and Gordon and Baron Von Falkenhayn the General Director of NSU motorcycles.
