= 1922 Isle of Man TT =

Annual motorcycle racing event

1922 Isle of Man Tourist Trophy
- Date: May 30 and June 1, 1922
- Location: Douglas, Isle of Man
- Course: Snaefell Mountain Course; 37.75 miles (60.75 km)
- Organiser: Auto-Cycle Union
- Clerk: T.W. Loughborough

Lightweight TT
- First: Geoff S. Davison, Levis
- Second: Dan Young, Rex-Acme
- Third: Stanley Jones, Velocette

Fastest lap
- Wal Handley; 44min. 24sec. 51.00 mph New record

Junior TT
- First: Tom Sheard, AJS
- Second: George Grinton, AJS
- Third: Jack Thomas, Sheffield-Henderson

Fastest lap
- Bert le Vack; 40min. 7sec. 56.46 mph New record

Senior TT
- First: Alec Bennett, Sunbeam 349cc
- Second: Walter Brandish, Triumph
- Third: Harry Langman, Scott

Fastest lap
- Alec Bennett; 37min. 46sec. 59.99 mph New record

The 1922 Isle of Man Tourist Trophy introduced a new race, within a race, for 250 cc motorcycles called the Lightweight TT, to be run concurrently with the already-established Junior 350 cc that took place on Tuesday 30 May, and Senior 500 cc race on Thursday 1 June.

The new third race was achieved by splitting the 250 cc machines away from, but run simultaneously with, the 350 cc machines that had previously been racing together in the up-to-350 cc engine-capacity limit. Thirty three lightweights started first before the 350 cc machines, and the fastest lap was achieved by Wal Handley on an OK-Supreme at 51 mph (82 km/h). The win by Geoff S Davison on a Levis was the last TT win for a British two-stroke motorcycle.

By winning the 350 cc race, Tom Sheard became the first Manxman to win a Tourist Trophy race, with an average speed of 54.75 mph (88.11 km/h), covering 188.75 miles (303.76 km). Seventeen-year-old Stanley Woods attained fifth position on a Cotton with a time of 3hrs 50min 33secs, despite having to contend with a broken exhaust pipe and a pit-fire that set both man and machine ablaze.

Walter Brandish, placed second in the 500 cc race would become, in 1923, the first rider to have a bend on the course named after him (Brandish Corner). He just failed – by 22 seconds – to break the four-hour time that the winner Alec Bennett achieved for the first time in a six-lap race that he led from start to finish, with a new lap record of 59.99 mph (96.54 km/h). This was the last TT win by a side-valve machine.

== Lightweight and Junior TT Race ==
It was held on Tuesday, May 30, 1922, at 10:00 am over a distance of 188.75 miles, 5 laps of 37.75 miles each. Lightweight machines were limited of cylinder capacity not exceeding 250cc., they ran concurrently with Junior TT machines of 350cc. Riders started off at intervals of half-a-minute. All 32 entries started the race in Lightweight class and 14 finished. Out of 37 entries in Junior, 35 started and 16 finished.

The 11th International Isle of Man Tourist Trophy

Pos	#	Rider	Bike	Cyl.	Lightweight TT race classification			
Pos	#	Rider	Bike	Cyl.	Laps	Time	Speed	Prizes & Remarks
1	11	(United Kingdom) Geoff S. Davison	247cc Levis	1	5	3:46.56.8	49.89 mph	1st Prize - Winner of Lightweight Tourist Trophy, £30 and special gold medal.
2	31	(United Kingdom) Dan Young	249cc Rex-Acme	1	5	4:00.17.6	47.12 mph	2nd Prize - £20 and replica 1st Private entry.
3	9	(United Kingdom) Stanley J. Jones	249cc Velocette	1	5	4:01.31.6	46.90 mph	3rd Prize - £10 and replica.
4	32	(United Kingdom) L. Padley	249cc Sheffield-Henderson	1	5	4:04.41.0	46.29 mph	Replica.
5	1	(United Kingdom) Doug Prentice	249cc New Imperial	1	5	4:11.09.0	45.10 mph	Replica.
6	30	(United Kingdom) Lieut. Charlie North	249cc OK Junior	1	5	4:16.15.2	44.28 mph	Replica.
7	4	(United Kingdom) Neville Hall	249cc OK Junior	1	5	4:19.07.4	43.68 mph	
8	4	(United Kingdom) C.H. Hopwood	247cc Levis	1	5	4:30.03.2	41.83 mph	
9	25	(United Kingdom) L. Nicholson	248cc Coulson	1	5	4:31.17.6	41.83 mph	
10	16	(United Kingdom) R.W. Loughton	249cc Francis-Barnett	1	5	4:39.28.0	40.56 mph	
Fastest lap: Wal Handley, 44min. 24sec. 51.00 mph (New record)

Pos	#	Rider	Bike	Cyl.	Junior TT race classification			
Pos	#	Rider	Bike	Cyl.	Laps	Time	Speed	Prizes & Remarks
1	44	(Isle of Man) Tom Sheard	348cc AJS	1	5	3:26.48.2	54.75 mph	1st Prize - Winner of Junior Trophy, £30 and a special gold medal.
2	53	(Scotland) George Grinton	348cc AJS	1	5	3:37.17.8	52.10 mph	2nd Prize - £20 and replica.
3	50	(Wales) Jack Thomas	348cc Sheffield-Henderson	1	5	3:47.28.6	49.79 mph	3rd Prize - £10 and replica.
4	65	(United Kingdom) Reg. Lucas	348cc Coulson	1	5	3:50.10.0	49.19 mph	Replica. 1st Private entry.
5	40	(Republic of Ireland) Stanley Woods	348cc Cotton	1	5	3:50.32.2	49.13 mph	Replica. 2nd Private entry.
6	69	(United Kingdom) Jack Haslam	346cc Douglas	2	5	4:05.22.0	46.16 mph	3rd Private entry.
7	63	(United Kingdom) Percy A. Newman	349cc Ivy	1	5	4:05.46.2	46.16 mph	
8	56	(United Kingdom) George Shepherd	348cc Edmund	1	5	4:07.26.0	45.79 mph	
9	37	(United Kingdom) John Bance	348cc OEC Blackburne	1	5	4:08.12.6	45.63 mph	
10	54	(United Kingdom) T.A. Jones	349cc Ivy	1	5	4:10.38.0	45.19 mph	
11	66	(United Kingdom) Harry Brockbank	348cc Cotton	1	5	4:12.27.8	44.85 mph	
12	67	(United Kingdom) Roland Flint	349cc Ivy	1	5	4:13.38.8	44.64 mph	
13	39	(United Kingdom) A.W. Muirhead	346cc DOT	1	5	4:17.15.2	44.01 mph	
14	68	(Northern Ireland) Herbert Chambers	348cc AJS	1	5	4:42.05.6	40.14 mph	
15	41	(United Kingdom) Freddy Morgan	348cc Cotton	1	5	4:58.10.0	37.98 mph	
16	59	(Northern Ireland) Sammy A. Dale	348cc New Scale	1	5	5:16.53.0	35.72 mph	
Fastest lap: Bert le Vack, 40min. 7sec. 56.46 mph (New record)

== Senior TT Race ==
It was held on Thursday, June 1, 1922, at 10:00 am over a distance of 226.50 miles, 6 laps of 37.75 miles each. Senior TT machines were limited of cylinder capacity not exceeding 500cc. All 67 entries started the race, comprising 56 four-stroke Singles, 5 two-stroke Twins, 5 four-stroke Flat Twins and 1 four-stroke V Twin. Twenty-two riders finished the race.

The 11th International Isle of Man Tourist Trophy

Pos	#	Rider	Bike	Cyl.	Senior TT race classification			
Pos	#	Rider	Bike	Cyl.	Laps	Time	Speed	Prizes & Remarks
1	44	(Canada) Alec Bennett	492cc Sunbeam	1	6	3.53.00.2	58.33 mph	1st Prize - Winner of Senior Tourist Trophy, £50 and special gold medal.
2	4	(United Kingdom) Walter Brandish	499cc Triumph	1	6	4.00.22.6	56.52 mph	2nd Prize - £35 and replica.
3	66	(United Kingdom) Harry Langman	486cc Scott	2	6	4:02.14.8	56.09 mph	3rd Prize - £15 and replica.
4	5	(United Kingdom) Clarrie Wood	486cc Scott	2	6	4:06.10.0	55.20 mph	Replica.
5	15	(United Kingdom) Graham Walker	490cc Norton	1	6	4:09.08.0	54.55 mph	Replica. Entered as replacement rider of Victor Horsman entry.
6	2	(United Kingdom) Tommy de la Hay	492cc Sunbeam	1	6	4:14.05.0	53.48 mph	Replica.
7	6	(Scotland) Alfie Alexander	496cc Douglas	2	6	4:15.56.0	53.30 mph	Replica.
8	41	(United Kingdom) Vivan Olsson	492cc Sunbeam	1	6	4:16.27.0	52.99 mph	Replica.
9	41	(United Kingdom) Geoff Clapham	486cc Scott Squirrel	2	6	4:18.03.4	52.67 mph	Replica.
10	59	(United Kingdom) Jimmy Adamson	490cc Norton	1	6	4:19.13.6	52.41 mph	Replica.
11	42	(United Kingdom) Douglas Davidson	498.8cc Indian	1	6	4:28.37.0	50.60 mph	
12	52	(United Kingdom) Ossie Wade	348cc AJS	1	6	4:32.51.0	49.80 mph	
13	47	(United Kingdom) Frank Halford	499cc Triumph	1	6	4:33.28.0	49.70 mph	
14	8	(United Kingdom) Oliver Baldwin	499cc Rudge	1	6	4:33.37.0	49.67 mph	
15	36	(United Kingdom) R.M. Knowles	490cc Norton	1	6	4:35.31.0	49.41 mph	
16	25	(United Kingdom) George Strange	490cc Sheffield-Henderson	1	6	4:37.15.0	49.01 mph	
17	26	(United Kingdom) Geoff S. Davison	492cc Sunbeam	1	6	4:51.25.0	46.63 mph	
18	60	(United Kingdom) Edward Mundey	496.5cc New Hudson	1	6	4:58.10.0	45.58 mph	
19	57	(United Kingdom) George Cowley Sr.	492cc Sunbeam	1	6	5:03.19.0	44.80 mph	
20	19	(United Kingdom) Charlie Waterhouse, jun.	499cc Sunbeam	1	6	5:12.58.0	43.40 mph	
21	18	(Scotland) Graham Black	490cc Norton	1	6	5:16.48.0	42.90 mph	
22	7	(United Kingdom) George H. Tucker	490cc Norton	1	6	5:42.43.0	39.61 mph	
Fastest lap: Alec Bennett, 37min. 46sec. 59.99 mph (New record)
