= Graham Walker (motorcyclist) =

British motorcycle racer (1896–1962)

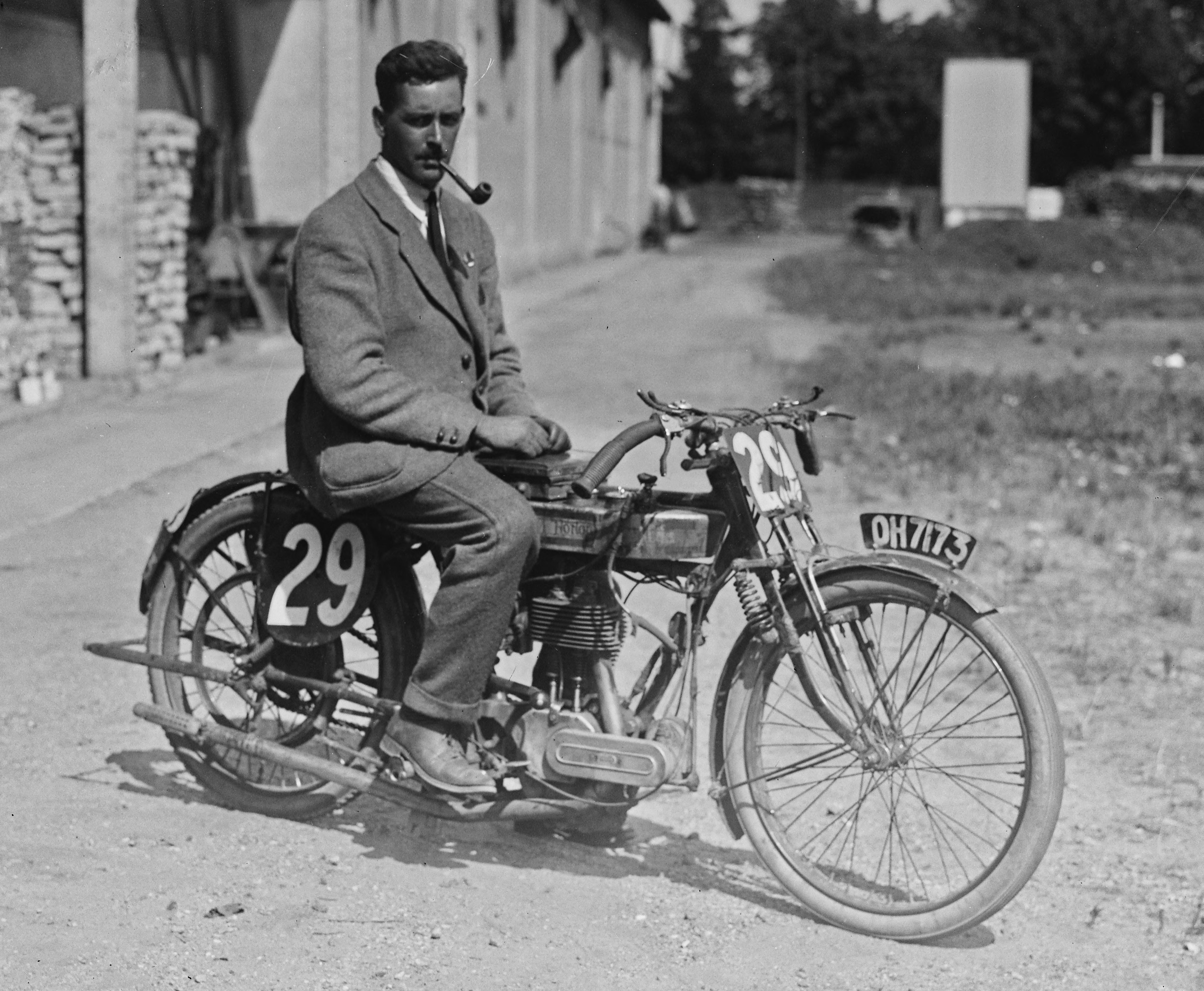
- Walker in 1921
- Born: 4 August 1896; Wallington, Surrey, England
- Died: 7 September 1962 (aged 66)
- Education: Highgate School
- Relatives: Eric Anderson Walker (brother); Murray Walker (son)
- Nationality: British
Motorcycle racing career statistics
Isle of Man TT career
TTs contested	15 (1920-1934)
TT wins	1
First TT win	1931 Lightweight TT
Last TT win	1931 Lightweight TT
TT podiums	6
- Military career
- Allegiance: United Kingdom
- Branch: British Army
- Unit: Royal Engineers Signal Service
- Conflicts: World War I

Graham William Walker (4 August 1896 – 7 September 1962) was an English motorcycle racer, broadcaster and journalist. He also contributed greatly to the motorcycle section of the National Motor Museum.

== Biography ==
Walker was born on 4 August 1896 in Wallington, Surrey, and was the son of William Walker (1851–?), a shipping company clerk, and Jessie née Goodman (1859–?). He had two sisters and two brothers, one of whom was Eric Anderson Walker. He was educated at Highgate School from 1910 to 1912 and had five siblings - three brothers and two sisters. Walker married Elsie Norah Fyfield née Spratt (1897–1999) and together they had one son, Graeme Murray Walker, who went on to have a long career as a motorsport commentator.

Walker was a motorcycle despatch rider in the First World War for the Royal Engineers Signal Service, where he received a leg injury requiring him to ride a motorcycle with a modified brake pedal. Despite this, he had a successful racing career with Rudge, Sunbeam and Norton. Riding a 493cc Sunbeam, he was a member of the victorious British International Trophy Team at the ISDT held in Buxton 1926 and Ambleside 1927 then saw success on the Silver Vase team in 1928 at Harrogate and 1932 Merano in Italy. Road successes included winning the Ulster Grand Prix on a Rudge Ulster in 1928, the first road race win with an average of 80 mph. Walker also won the 350cc class at the 1931 North West 200, again on a Rudge. He rode many times in the Isle of Man TT, winning the lightweight (250cc) class in 1931, and became president of the TT Riders Association.

During the Second World War, Walker took part in a campaign to recruit new dispatch riders.

In 1935, after his motorcycle racing career had finished, Walker was employed by the BBC as a commentator for motorcycle racing events on television and radio. In 1949, Walker was partnered on the BBC's motorcycle commentaries with his son, Murray.

Walker was editor of Motor Cycling magazine from 1938 to 1954 and he then took up a directorship at the Montagu Motor Museum, of which his enthusiasm for preserving historic motorcycles partly led to the museum having opened a motorcycle section in 1956.

== Isle of Man TT Race career ==
Year	Race	Position	Make of Motorcycle
1920	Senior TT	13th	Norton
1921	Senior TT	Ret	Norton
1922	Senior TT	5th	Norton
1923	Senior TT	4th	Norton
1923	Sidecar TT	2nd	Norton
1924	Sidecar TT	Ret	Sunbeam
1925	Senior TT	Ret	Sunbeam
1925	Sidecar TT	Ret	Sunbeam
1926	Senior TT	10th	Sunbeam
1927	Senior TT	5th	Sunbeam
1927	Junior TT	Ret	Sunbeam
1928	Senior TT	Ret	Rudge
1929	Senior TT	Ret	Rudge
1930	Senior TT	2nd	Rudge
1930	Junior TT	3rd	Rudge
1931	Senior TT	5th	Rudge
1931	Lightweight TT	1st	Rudge
1931	Junior TT	5th	Rudge
1932	Senior TT	6th	Rudge
1932	Lightweight TT	2nd	Rudge
1932	Junior TT	5th	Rudge
1933	Senior TT	Ret	Rudge
1934	Senior TT	6th	Rudge
1934	Lightweight TT	3rd	Rudge

Sporting positions
Preceded by Jimmie Simpson	500cc Motorcycle European Champion; 1927	Succeeded by Wal Handley
Preceded by Syd Crabtree	250cc Motorcycle European Champion; 1930	Succeeded by Riccardo Brusi
