= Kenzo Tada =

Japanese motorcycle racer

- Born: 17 February 1889; Japan
- Died: 1976 (aged 86–87)
- Occupation: Velocette importer
- Known for: first Asian Isle of Man TT racer

Kenzo Tada (多田健蔵, Tada Kenzō; 17 February 1889 – 1976) was a dirt track motorcycle racer who was born in Japan and became the first Asian to compete in the Isle of Man TT. He started his career in 1907 as a bicycle racer; his company, Tomeye Trading Co., was the Velocette motorcycle importer in Tokyo. He started racing motorcycles in 1921, at which time there were only 20 racers in Japan, and he became a leading organizer of motorsport events in Japan.

During the Taishō era, there had been a rapid growth of the motorcycling industry and racing in Japan. Races, sponsored by the national newspapers and intended to boost enthusiasm for Japan's rapidly developing industry, attracted crowds of up to 50,000.

Tada was invited to race at the 1930 Isle of Man TT by Veloce Ltd, to celebrate the global popularity of their new KTT production racer. Tada had imported three KTTs to Tokyo in 1929, and was the Japanese National Champion. It him took 40 days by sea and rail, to reach the Isle of Man: he was the first Asian rider to compete in the event, and was the first Japanese rider to race overseas. Tada was loaned Alec Bennett's semi-works 350cc Velocette KTT bike, finishing 15th while gaining the nickname "the India Rubber Man", as he had a number of minor falls during the course of the race but remounted to carry on. At the prize giving ceremony after the race, Tada wore traditional haori (half length kimono jacket), hakama (loose trousers), tabi (toe socks), and geta (wooden sandals).

== Filmography ==
- 'Faster Than Ever: An All-British Victory!', British Pathe, 1930
