= Leslie Archer =

Leslie Archer may refer to:

- Leslie Archer (1907–2001), British motorcycle racer
- Leslie Archer Jr. (1929–2019), British motorcycle racer, son of Leslie Archer
