= H. C. Lamacraft =

English motorcycle racer

Harry Charles Lamacraft (1911 – 3 May 1943) was an English motorcycle racer, most noted for successful exploits at the Brooklands racetrack and at the Isle of Man TT in the 1930s. He took tenth place in the 1934 Isle of Man Junior TT and tenth place in the 1935 Isle of Man Senior TT. In all, he rode in the TT 11 times, finishing above 19th place every time.

Lamacraft was most successful racing Velocette 350 cc KTT and Excelsior (Coventry) 500 cc motorcycles. His first KTT was later sold to Bert Perryman, who began his career at Brooklands with this machine. This machine is now property of Jeff Clew and can be seen in the Haynes International Motor Museum. His second Velocette, a KTT mk IV, raced at Brooklands and the Isle of Man (1933/34 TT's), won tenth place 1933 Junior TT. This machine was sold to David Vincent, who won his Gold Star at Brooklands for lapping at 100 mph during a race with Lamacraft's former motorcycle. Lamacraft won a Gold Star at Brooklands in 1935, of a lap of over 100 mph during a race. Period photographs show that he experimented with supercharging on his mkV Velocette, presumably for racing at Brooklands.

Lamacraft joined the Royal Air Force during World War II and served as a flight sergeant navigator, flying a Lockheed Ventura bomber. He was killed in a mission to destroy a power plant on 3 May 1943 over the Netherlands, aged 32. He is buried in Amersfoort, the Netherlands. The personal (family) inscription on his gravestone reads: "A BODY OF ENGLAND'S BREATHING ENGLISH AIR, ... BLEST BY SUNS OF HOME".

== Sources ==
- A Clubman at Brooklands, AC Perryman, Foulis 1979
- Kieg Collection Volume 1, BMS 1981
- 20 Squadron
- Reminiscences of David Vincent
- The Times, Monday, 20 March 1944; pg. 6; Issue 49809; col D
- UK Birth, Marriage and Death database
