= Les Archer =

British motorcycle racer

Leslie James Archer (20 June 1907 – 2001) was an English leading motorcycle racer of the 1920s, competing in long-distance speed trials, hill climbs and scrambles, now known as motocross.

Archer was the son of an Aldershot motorcycle dealer. Riding for the New Imperial factory, he set several speed world records at the Brooklands motor racing circuit. Archer was also a regular competitor at the Isle of Man TT with a best finish of fourth place at the 1934 Senior TT, aboard a Velocette. He retired after the 1948 Isle of Man TT, in which his son, Les Archer, Jr., also competed. He continued to run the family business in Aldershot and followed the fortunes of his son, who went on to win the 500cc European motocross championship in 1956. His shop also employed Eric Cheney, who went on to become one of the top British motorcycle designers.
