= Alec Bennett =

Irish motorcycle racer

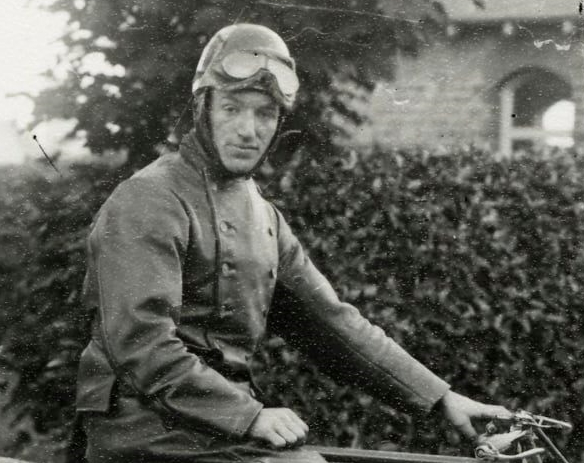
- Alec Bennett at the 1921 Isle of Man TT
- Nationality: Irish-Canadian
- Born: 1897
- Died: 1973 (aged 75–76)
Motorcycle racing career statistics
Isle of Man TT career
TTs contested	10 (1921-1929, 1932)
TT wins	5
First TT win	1922 Senior TT
Last TT win	1928 Junior TT
TT podiums	8

Alec Bennett (1897–1973) was an Irish-Canadian motorcycle racer famous for motorcycle Grand Prix wins and five career wins at the Isle of Man TT races.

== Biography ==
A native of Craigantlet in Ireland's County Down, Bennett emigrated with his parents to Canada at a very young age. He did not return to the United Kingdom until active duty with the Canadian Expeditionary Force during the First World War when he served as a dispatch rider and later as a fighter pilot. After racing with the works Norton team and also with the factory Sunbeam and Velocette teams, Bennett retired from motorcycle racing in the 1930s to concentrate on his retail motor-trade business in Southampton, Hampshire.

== Isle of Man TT Race Career ==
=== TT victories ===
Year	Race & Capacity	Motorcycle	Average Speed
1922	Senior 500cc	Sunbeam	58.31 mph
1924	Senior 500cc	Norton	61.64 mph
1926	Junior 350cc	Velocette KTT	66.70 mph
1927	Senior 500cc	Norton CS1	68.41 mph
1928	Junior 350cc	Velocette	68.65 mph

=== TT career summary ===
Finishing Position	1st	2nd	3rd	4th	7th	9th	10th	DNF
Number of times	5	1	1	1	1	1	1	6
