= Jimmy Simpson (motorcyclist) =

British motorcycle racer

Jimmy (Jimmie) Simpson
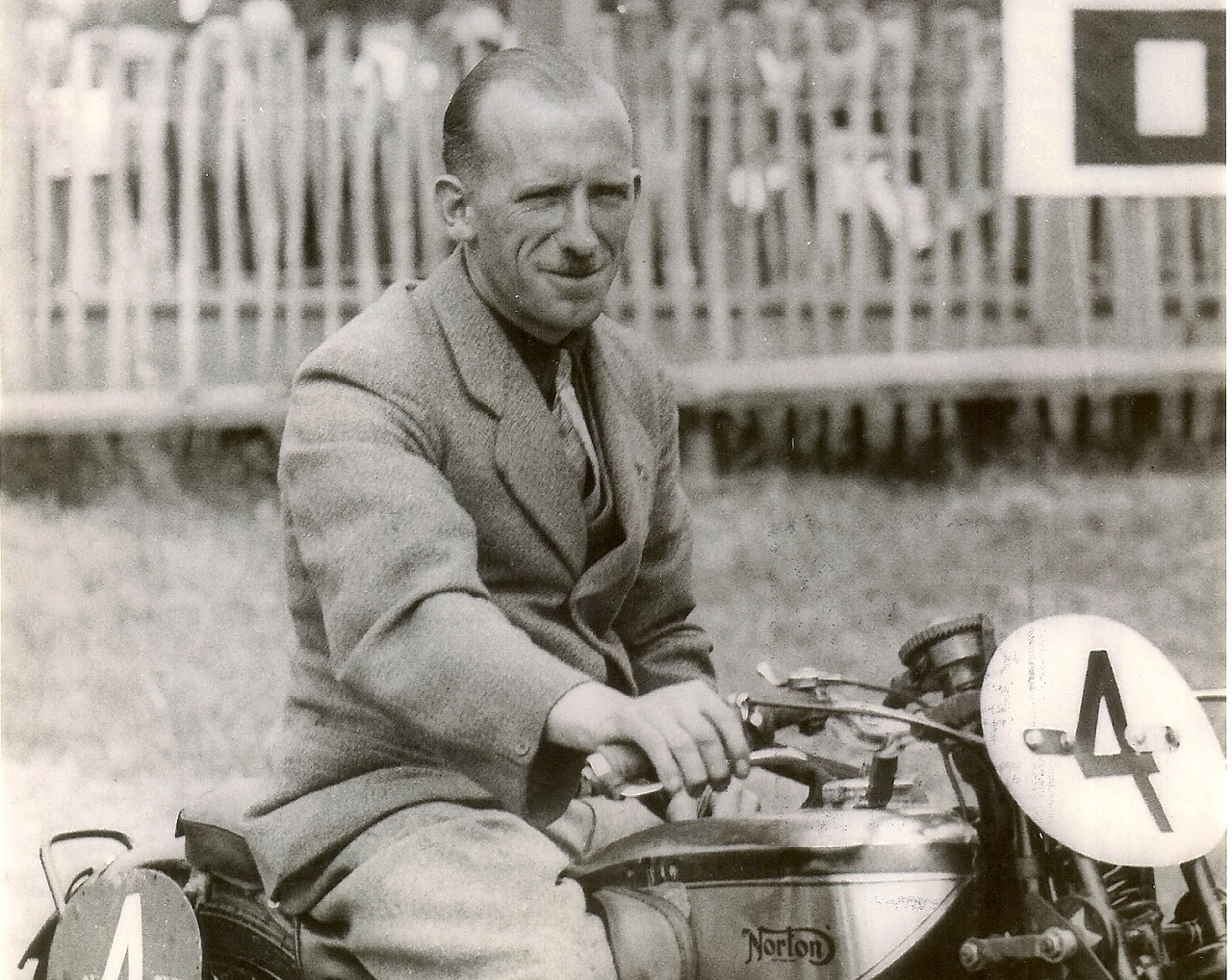
- Jimmie Simpson in 1930
- Nationality: British
- Born: 1898
- Died: 1982 (aged 83–84)
Motorcycle racing career statistics
Isle of Man TT career
TTs contested	13 (1922-1934)
TT wins	1
TT podiums	10

Jimmy H. Simpson (1898–1981) was a British motorcycle racer.

Simpson spent many years as a works rider, first with AJS and later with Norton. He was one of the most successful riders before World War II.

== Career ==
=== Beginnings ===
Simpson was the elder brother of novelist John Hampson. In 1922, he took part in the Isle of Man TT for the first time. He competed in the 500 cc Senior TT race on a Scott and retired after half a lap with damage to his motorcycle.

=== Works rider for AJS (1923-1928) ===
In 1923, Simpson moved to AJS. His first TT for them was the 350 cc Junior TT and despite setting a new lap record for his class, he fell whilst leading the race by over a minute.

In 1924, Simpson took part in both the 500 cc Senior TT and the Junior TT and finished neither race. That year, the European Championship was held for the first time, at the Circuito di Milano in Monza, Italy. Simpson won the 350 cc race, becoming the first European champion in that category.

1925 saw Simpson once again take part in both the Senior TT and Junior TT races on the Isle of Man, as well as the Sidecar TT, in which he finished fifth. In the Senior TT he failed to finish but came third in the Junior TT. In July, Simpson won the UMF Grand Prix at Montlhéry on a Sunbeam.

In 1926, Simpson achieved his best result so far at the Isle of Man TT with second place in the Junior TT. He also won the 500 cc race at the Belgian Grand Prix, held at Spa-Francorchamps. The race carried the European Championship title and so Simpson won his second European title, albeit his only win in the 500 cc category. In August, Simpson won the 350 cc German Grand Prix at the AVUS track.

1927 was Simpson's most successful year so far. He came third in the Junior TT and again won the 350 cc European Championship at the German Grand Prix, held at the Nürburgring. He also won the 350 cc races at the Swiss, Belgian and Austrian Grands Prix.

=== Works rider for Norton (1929 onwards) ===
In 1929, Simpson moved to Norton. He failed to finish either the Senior or Junior TTs, but in 1930 he came third in the Senior TT before winning the 500 cc race at the inaugural Swedish Grand Prix, his first international win for Norton.

From 1931, Norton possessed a level of confidence in their single cylinder four stroke engines that would later lead to them dominating the larger 350 cc and 500 cc classes. At the Senior TT, Simpson became the first person to lap the Snaefell Mountain Course at 80 mph (130 km/h) but he retired. Once again, he won the Swedish Grand Prix in the 500 cc category.

In 1932, Simpson came third at the Senior TT. He also won the 350 cc UMF and Belgian Grands Prix.

At the 1933 Isle of Man TT, Simpson finished second in the Senior TT to his teammate, Stanley Woods. He won the 350 cc Swedish Grand Prix which carried the European Championship title, becoming European Champion in the 350 cc class for the third time.

=== End of career (1934) ===
At the Isle of Man TT in 1934, Simpson finished second to his teammates in both the Senior and Junior TT. In the 250 cc Lightweight TT, Simpson competed on a Rudge. He beat his teammates, Ernie Nott and Graham Walker, whilst setting a new lap record for the class and securing his first victory at the TT, which was also to be Rudge's last.

Simpson won the 350 cc European Championship title for the fifth time at the Dutch TT. He also won the 350 cc German Grand Prix, the 350 cc and 500 cc Suiss Grands Prix, the 350 cc Belgian Grand Prix and the 350 cc Ulster Grand Prix

After retiring from active competition, Simpson joined the Shell petrol company as a member of its racing division.

== Jimmy Simpson Trophy ==
The Jimmy Simpson Trophy is an annual award at the Isle of Man TT Races. Donated by Arthur Birkett the trophy was first presented at the 1948 Isle of Man TT and is presented to the rider who completes the fastest lap of the meeting.

== Summary ==
=== Titles ===
- 1924 – 350 cc European champion on an AJS
- 1926 – 500 cc European champion on an AJS
- 1927 – 350 cc European champion on an AJS
- 1933 – 350 cc European champion on a Norton
- 1934 – 350 cc European champion on a Norton

=== Isle of Man TT wins ===
Year	Category	Motorcycle	Average speed
1934	Lightweight (250 cc)	Rudge	70.81 mph (113.96 km/h)

=== Race wins ===
A yellow background denotes that the race carried European Championship status

Year	Category	Motorcycle	Race	Circuit
1924	350 cc	AJS	Nations Grand Prix	Monza
1925	500 cc	Sunbeam	UMF Grand Prix	Montlhéry
1926	500 cc	AJS	Belgian Grand Prix	Spa-Francorchamps
1926	350 cc	AJS	German Grand Prix	AVUS
1927	350 cc	AJS	Swiss Grand Prix	Genf
1927	350 cc	AJS	German Grand Prix	Nürburgring
1927	350 cc	AJS	Belgian Grand Prix	Spa-Francorchamps
1927	350 cc	AJS	Austrian Grand Prix	Vösendorf
1930	500 cc	Norton	Swedish Grand Prix	Saxtorp
1931	500 cc	Norton	Swedish Grand Prix	Saxtorp
1932	350 cc	Norton	UMF Grand Prix	Reims-Gueux
1932	350 cc	Norton	Belgian Grand Prix	Spa-Francorchamps
1933	350 cc	Norton	UMF Grand Prix	Dieppe
1933	350 cc	Norton	Swedish Grand Prix	Saxtorp
1934	350 cc	Norton	Dutch TT	Circuit van Drenthe
1934	350 cc	Norton	German Grand Prix	Badberg-Viereck
1934	350 cc	Norton	Swiss Grand Prix	Bremgarten
1934	500 cc	Norton	Swiss Grand Prix	Bremgarten
1934	350 cc	Norton	Belgian Grand Prix	Spa-Francorchamps
1934	350 cc	Norton	Ulster Grand Prix	Clady Circuit

Sporting positions
Preceded by None	350 cc Motorcycle European Champion; 1924	Succeeded by Tazio Nuvolari
Preceded by Mario Revelli	500 cc Motorcycle European Champion; 1926	Succeeded by Graham Walker
Preceded by Frank Longman	350 cc Motorcycle European Champion; 1927	Succeeded by Wal Handley
Preceded by Louis Jeannin	350 cc Motorcycle European Champion; 1933-1934	Succeeded by Wal Handley
