= Wal Handley =

British motorcycle racer

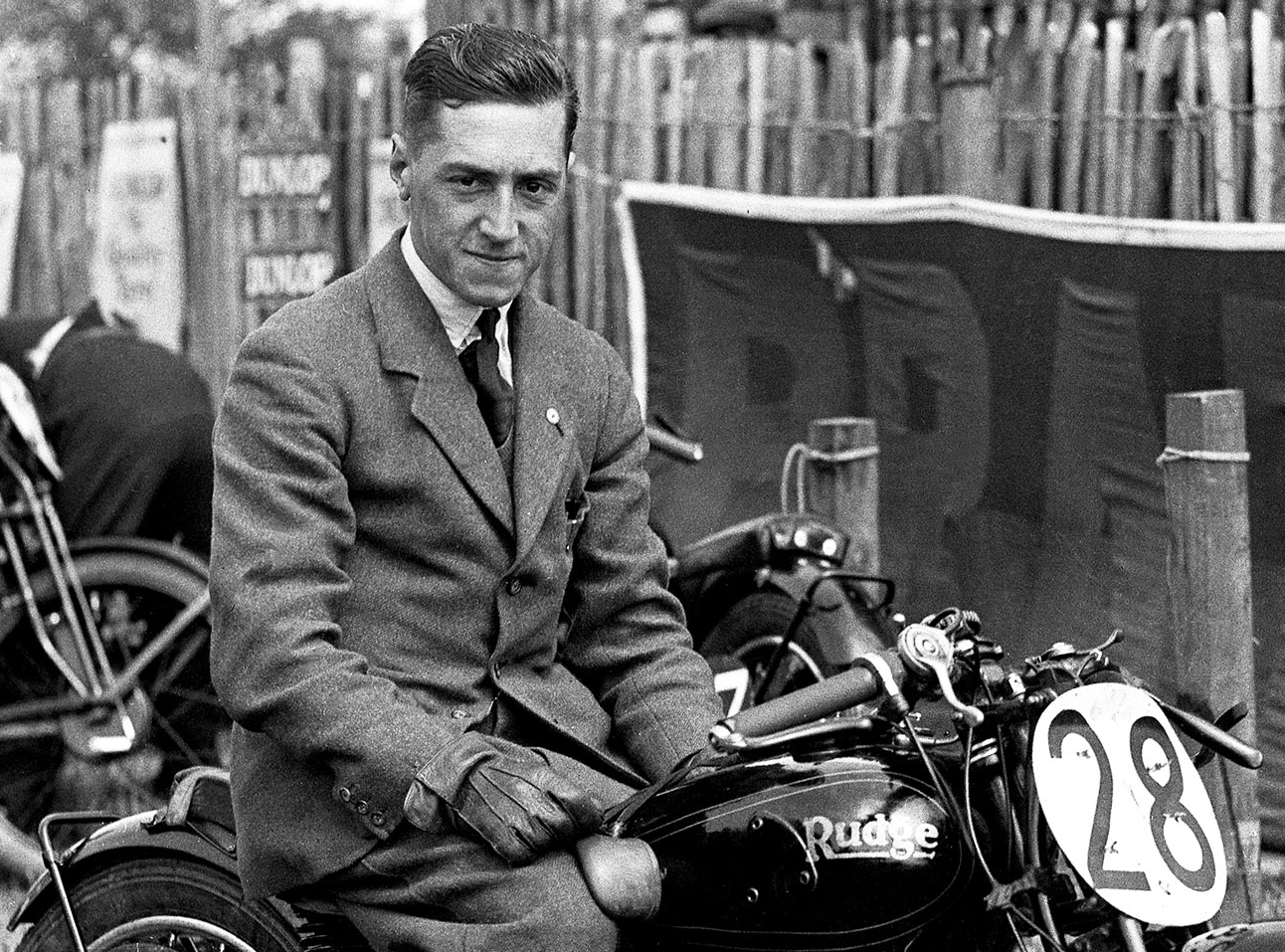
- Wal Handley in 1930
- Nationality: British
- Born: 5 April 1902; Aston, Birmingham, England
- Died: 15 November 1941 (aged 39)
Motorcycle racing career statistics
Isle of Man TT career
TTs contested	13 (1922-1934)
TT wins	4
First TT win	1925 Junior TT
Last TT win	1930 Senior TT
TT podiums	9

Walter Leslie Handley (5 April 1902 – 15 November 1941) born in Aston, Birmingham, known as Wal Handley, was a champion British inter-war motorcycle racer with four wins at the Isle of Man TT Races in his career. Later on, he also raced cars in the 1930s and died in a World War II aircraft accident while serving as pilot with the Air Transport Auxiliary.

== Biography ==
Walter Leslie Handley was born on 5 April 1902, son of John Thomas Handley and his wife Clara. He had a hard childhood. His father died of cancer when he was only nine and he soon had to help by working. He was just over 12 years old when he left school early and tried a variety of jobs before joining the OK motorcycle firm. He became a Junior Tester and general helper. His motorcycle career began with reliability trials, hill climbs and speed trials. In 1922, aged 20, he took his opportunity to ride an OK in the first Lightweight TT race in the Isle of Man. The story of his setting off in the wrong direction of the course in practice is well known but the ridicule in the Press stung him into action and on race day he gained a fastest lap from a standing start but his lead ended on the second lap with a broken inlet valve. His ill luck continued into 1923 but in the Lightweight Race after leading for the first three laps he managed to finish in eighth place with an average speed of 47.8 mph. He was awarded the Nisbet Shield by the ACU Stewards for pluck and endurance after suffering a 'packet of troubles'. By 1924, he had joined the Rex Acme Company but with his ill luck continuing he was beginning to earn the unwelcome tag of 'Unlucky Handley'. This was after suffering mechanical failures in all his TT races when in the lead. Then in 1925, his luck changed dramatically, he became the first rider to win two TT races in one week and three fastest laps. His first TT victory was the Junior TT. He won at the record speed of 65.02 mph with a fastest lap of 65.89 mph. After nearly three and a half hours in the saddle; it was over 35 minutes faster than the previous year's winner. Of the 50 starters, only 14 managed to finish and only four gained replicas because of the high speed set by the winner.

The following year, Handley finished second in his first Senior TT. He had been delayed by over seven minutes with plug trouble. He piloted his 60-degree Rex Acme V-twin through the field from 22nd to finish runner up to Stanley Woods who had won the first seven lap Senior TT by 4 mins 21 secs. In the following year in the Lightweight TT, he beat the Italian challengers by over eight minutes. In 1929, he gained a second place with his AJS in the Junior TT; then later in the week the Senior TT got off to a wet start and several riders slid off their bikes in the opening lap at Greeba Bridge including Wal. He was unhurt and quickly moved fallen riders and their machines off the road preventing further calamities before going to get help. On 21 June 1929 the ACU Secretary, Tom Loughborough sent Wal a letter thanking him for thinking of others by giving up his own chances.

Handley's fourth win was the rain soaked Senior TT of 1930. He won on his works-assisted Rudge at the record speed of 74.24 mph. He became the first rider to lap the mountain course under 30 mins, the first to do two laps under the hour and the first to do four laps under two hours. It was also the last time a push rod machine won a TT race; and it was the last time that a TT winner's bike could have been bought over the counter by an enthusiast as a near standard production machine. In this race of records, it was also the first TT race to be broadcast live by the BBC.

Handley became successful on track as well as road. At Brooklands, he won both the solo and the sidecar 200-mile events on the notoriously rugged outer circuit. In 1929, he raced up Switzerland's Klausen Hill Climb to win the 350cc class at record speed, riding the Marchant designed Motosacoche. On the European mainland and in Northern Ireland, he had many Grand Prix victories. On three occasions in the inter-war period, he became European champion, twice in the 350cc class (1928 and 1935) and once in the 500cc class (1928). He also became the holder of numerous motorcycle world records taken in 1930 at Arpajon and Montlhéry aboard the Belgian FN designed by Dougal Marchant. Earlier, at Brooklands in 1926, he broke the 200-mile world records for all classes up to and including 1000cc on his 350cc Rex Acme. On the same day, he took the prestigious classic hour record for solo 500cc machines at 91.20 mph on a 350cc machine (Rex Acme-Blackburne). This is the only time this has been done.

In 1933, Handley also added a couple of 250cc continental Grand Prix wins riding Moto Guzzi machines, and in the same year, he broke the run of Norton dominance by winning the 350 class of the Ulster Grand Prix. In 1934, he contracted to race Norton motorcycles and gained his fifth win in the Belgian Grand Prix at Spa. In 1937, he gained the gold star for BSA by lapping the Brooklands circuit at over 107 mph. He did this at a time when most people had wrongly surmised that he had decided to retire.

=== MG & Riley Cars ===
Handley took up car racing in 1934, becoming a member of George Eyston's MG team. His car racing ability was soon remarked upon at Brooklands and also drew favourable comment in the Isle of Man 'Round the Houses' contests. He also raced cars at Donington and in the RAC International TT on the Ards circuit in Northern Ireland, but he had no success and, after MG exited motor racing, he teamed up with Freddie Dixon. In 1935, he became Dixon's co-driver and together they raced the Dixon Riley at Brooklands, where Walter shared in their gaining the Race Team Award in the 1935 500-mile race. It was at Donington in the British Empire Trophy Race of 1936 that Handley suffered serious injuries when the Riley somersaulted at the Hairpin Bend. A major factor causing this spectacular crash was due to the fact that Dixon had decided to experiment by locking the differential on the eve of the race and there had been no time to practise. No sooner had Handley recovered from his injuries than he was looking for another opportunity to race when war came.

=== Aviation and war service ===
Handley's main relaxation came from flying. His flying instructor was Tommy Rose, who later became a famous aviator gaining the record for flying from London to Cape Town. Handley soon became a prominent member of the Midland Aero Club, his aircraft included an SE 5A, a Bristol fighter and a Puss Moth. By the time of World War II, he had flown for over 700 hours, an unusual achievement for a private owner at that time. When war came, he immediately volunteered to join the Air Transport Auxiliary (ATA). He became the CO at Hawarden, Flintshire - the largest Ferry Pool in the ATA.

Handley died on 15 November 1941 when his Bell P39 Airacobra AH 598 crashed after the engine started cutting-out during take-off from RAF Kirkbride, just south of Kirkbride in Cumberland. The crash site was near Fingland, 2 miles (3.2 km) east of RAF Kirkbride.

The accident was described by an eye-witness:-

"Walter took-off from an aerodrome....and crashed into a ploughed-field within five minutes of being airborne. He was piloting an Airacobra. When he took-off the motor was 'moving' hard with an awful din and when he throttled down, it appeared to cut for a few seconds and then finally died out. Wal side-slipped towards a wood with it seemed the intention of putting his craft into the tree-tops. He missed the wood by feet. The starboard-wing hit the ground first and the machine immediately exploded."

The ATA Accident Committee concluded that the cause of the fire could not be established.

Handley was 39 years old. Geoff Davison, a fellow competitor, who knew Walter well, said that Wal had many friends and only one enemy, himself, 'he would have had far more success in life had he been less morose in manner, less bluntly and directly accusing when ill-used.'

Handley was buried at Yardley Cemetery, Birmingham.

=== Final tributes ===
There were many tributes paid to Handley after his death. Ixion wrote, 'we have had great riders who were erratic, and others who were clumsy. But Handley was always visibly superb. Walter was one of our greatest aces.' He was the first rider to be commemorated in two places on the TT course. There is 'Handley's Cottage' so named because here on the S bend near the 12th milestone he had his first high speed crash on the fourth lap of the 1932 Senior TT. This happened when he was in third place chasing the all-conquering Norton's. The other place is the Memorial Seat at the top of Alexander Drive in Douglas, near the Quarter Bridge Road. The inscription reads:

In Memory of Walter L. Handley, Maker of Tourist Trophy Race History, Killed, Serving His Country, 15 November 1941 None Ever Passed This Way More Bravely

=== OK ===
Handley was the motorcycle messenger for the OK factory, and in 1922 he rode an OK Junior in the first Lightweight TT race held at the 1922 Isle of Man TT Races. Arriving on the Isle of Man the day before his first practice lap, Handley was confronted the next day with an early morning practice session with heavy mist and unfamiliarity with the Mountain Course, turned right and started to ride the course in the wrong direction. He was stopped by a Flag Marshal at Governor's Bridge just as other competitors were just about to complete their first lap of practice. This incident in practice involving Handley was described as the "Comedy of novice from Birmingham" by the national newspapers. He set the fastest lap of 51.01 mph (82.09 km/h) on an OK Junior even though he did not finish the race.

In the 1923 Isle of Man TT, Handley tried entering both the Lightweight and the Junior TT races, coming eighth in the Lightweight, but failing to finish in the Junior. His last ride for OK was on an OK-Supreme in the 1929 Lightweight TT, where he had a DNF.

=== Rex-Acme ===
In 1922, the Rex and Acme motorcycle companies were amalgamated to form Rex-Acme. Walter Handley raced Rex-Acme motorcycles from 1924 to 1928, making them famous, and even became a company director, but left in 1928 to ride different machinery. Handley rode Rex-Acmes using the Blackburne 173 cc single, and, in the 1926 Senior TT, the Rex-Acme OHV 498 cc V twin.

In 1924, Handley entered the Junior, Lightweight, and Ultra-Lightweight classes on Rex-Acme motorcycles, but failed to finish in any event. In the 1925 Isle of Man TT, entering the same races, and still riding for Rex-Acme, he won both the Junior and Ultra-Lightweight TT races, with a DNF in the Lightweight. That double win was the first time a rider had won two TT races in one week. In 1926, he came second in the Senior TT, and third in the Junior TT, with a DNF in the Lightweight TT. In 1927, he came first in the Lightweight TT, with a DNF on the final lap in the Junior TT when in the lead. In 1928, his Senior and Lightweight TT entries both failed to finish. His last Rex Acme ride was in the 1930 Lightweight TT but he had a DNF.

=== Other machinery and accomplishments ===
In 1928, Motosacoche made a name in the Grand Prix, with the 350 M 35 OHC racing bike, built by Dougal Marchant, of England, ridden to two European championship titles, 350 and 500, by Walter Handley.

In 1931, Handley tried a Belgian FN in the Isle of Man Senior TT, but did not finish. Dougal Marchant was the designer. On the European mainland, they broke several world records first with Motosacoche then in 1930 with the FN.

In 1932, Handley rode in the Senior, Junior, and Lightweight TT classes, a Rudge in each event, got second in the Lightweight, third in the Junior, and a DNF in the Senior. It was in the latter event that Handley's Corner on the Mountain Course was named after him. It was a high speed crash, the only such crash he suffered in his TT career.

In 1933, Handley rode a Velocette to seventh in the Junior, but his Excelsior failed to finish the Lightweight TT.

At the 1934 Isle of Man TT, Handley rode a Norton in the Junior, but did not finish.

An injury to a thumb caused by adjusting a drive-chain at Sulby caused Handley to withdraw from the 1935 TT Races.

In 1937 at Brooklands race track Handley won a race with a fastest lap at 107.57 mph on a 500 cc BSA Empire Star using alcohol as fuel. Handley had been persuaded out of retirement specially for the three lap race, which meant eight miles at top speed on the uneven and deteriorating banked oval track. It took skill and experience to win and Handley was awarded one of the traditional Gold Star badges. This inspired BSA to produce the BSA Gold Star.

== Isle of Man TT race career ==
=== TT race victories ===
Year	Race & capacity	Motorcycle	Average speed
1925	Ultra-Lightweight 175 cc	Rex-Acme	53.45 mph (86.02 km/h)
1925	Junior 350 cc	Rex-Acme	65.02 mph (104.64 km/h)
1927	Lightweight 250 cc	Rex-Acme	63.30 mph (101.87 km/h)
1930	Senior 500 cc	Rudge	74.24 mph (119.48 km/h)

=== TT career summary ===
Finishing position	1st	2nd	3rd	7th	8th	DNF
Number of times	4	3	2	1	1	17

== Car Racing ==
Handley was also involved with car racing, driving MGs and Rileys. In 1934, he joined the MG works team and in the 1934 BRDC International Trophy Race at Brooklands, Handley drove well until a back axle broke late in the race. Later in 1934, he co-drove Eyston's MG K3 'Magic Magnette', but crashed on the Railway Straight when an axle bearing seized. It was in September 1934 that he raced an N type MG Magnette in the Ards TT in Northern Ireland in the International RAC Sports Car Race, but had to retire with engine trouble. In 1934 and in 1935, he raced MGs in the Isle of Man Mannin Beg 'round the houses' event. In 1934, he led on the first lap with the MG Magnette but had a crash and retired shortly afterwards. In the following year, he entered the Mannin Beg with the 745cc MGR but retired with axle failure.

In 1935, Handley co-drove Freddie Dixon's Riley at Brooklands in the 500 Miles race, but the conrod holed the crankcase when he was competing for third place.

Handley and Pat Driscoll raced Dixon's 2-litre Riley in the first ever International Grand Prix road race held in Britain at Donington Park, on 5 October 1935, but they were not running at the finish of the 492.8 km race.

In 1936, Handley had a bad crash at the 1936 British Empire Trophy after taking over Freddie Dixon's third placed Riley and suffered serious injuries to his spine and ribs.

== Sources ==
Sporting positions
Preceded by Graham Walker	500cc Motorcycle European Champion; 1928	Succeeded by Tim Hunt
Preceded by Jimmie Simpson	350cc Motorcycle European Champion; 1928	Succeeded by Leo Davenport
Preceded by Jimmie Simpson	350cc Motorcycle European Champion; 1935	Succeeded by Freddie Frith
