= OK-Supreme =

British motorcycle manufacturer from 1899 to 1939

- Industry: Manufacturing and engineering
- Founded: 1882
- Defunct: 1939
- Fate: Wound up
- Headquarters: Birmingham, UK
- Key people: Ernie Humphries and Charles Dawes
- Products: Motorcycles

OK-Supreme was a British motorcycle manufacturer from 1899 to 1939 located in Birmingham. Grass-track racing versions of the machines continued to be available until 1946.

== History ==
In 1882 Ernie Humphries and Charles Dawes founded "OK" as bicycle manufacturers. They experimented with powered bicycles in 1899 and 1906, before manufacturing a two-stroke motorcycle using a Precision engine in 1911. Before the First World War they had produced motorcycles with Precision, De Dion, Minerva, and Green engines. Their first entry in the Isle of Man TT, in 1912, led to a ninth place and mainly modest results came during the following years with OK-Supreme machines scoring three podium places and 34 finishes.

After the war OK produced a 292 cc two-stroke motor of its own, but also produced models using Blackburne (250 cc and 350 cc, sv and ohv), Bradshaw (348 cc oil cooled), and JAP (246 cc to 496 cc) engines.

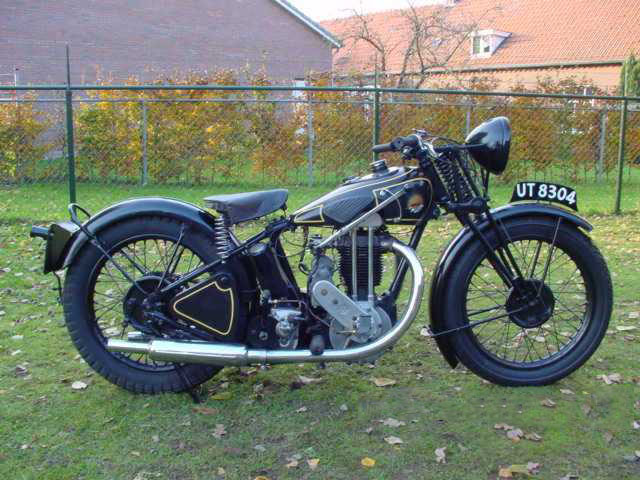
OK-Supreme 500 cc from 1930

The racing JAP versions did well in the 1920s, and the company increasingly turned to JAP to power bikes not using an OK engine. There was even a 348 cc OHC model.

In the 1922 TT OK-Supreme machines placed sixth and seventh, with the fastest lap being set by Wal Handley at 51 mph (82 km/h), but he failed to finish the race. Frank Longman was the only TT winner, in the 1928 Lightweight class with a JAP model.

Charles Dawes left to start Dawes Cycles in 1926, and in 1927 the name of the company was changed to OK-Supreme.

In 1928, Humphries bought the failed HRD Motorcycles for the factory and tools, selling the rest, including the name, to Phil Vincent, who developed the marque into Vincent Motorcycles.

A new 250cc machine with the cams fitted to the vertical tower (with an inspection window to see if oil was reaching the cams - hence the name "Lighthouse") made its first appearance at the 1930 TT where it broke the lap record from a standing start. A road version was made available the following year but the Great Depression killed it and the last Lighthouse was completed in early 1933. It was only available as a 250 although a handful of experimental 350s were built. In 1934, another overhead cam OK made its debut at the Olympia show. Available in road, trials and race trim and in 250 and 350 capacities, it continued in production until early 1939. Following WW2, a JAP-engined OK-Supreme grass-track racing machine was available through John Humphries, son of founder Ernie Humphries, until his death in 1946.
