= New Imperial Motors =

Former British motorcycle manufacturer

New Imperial
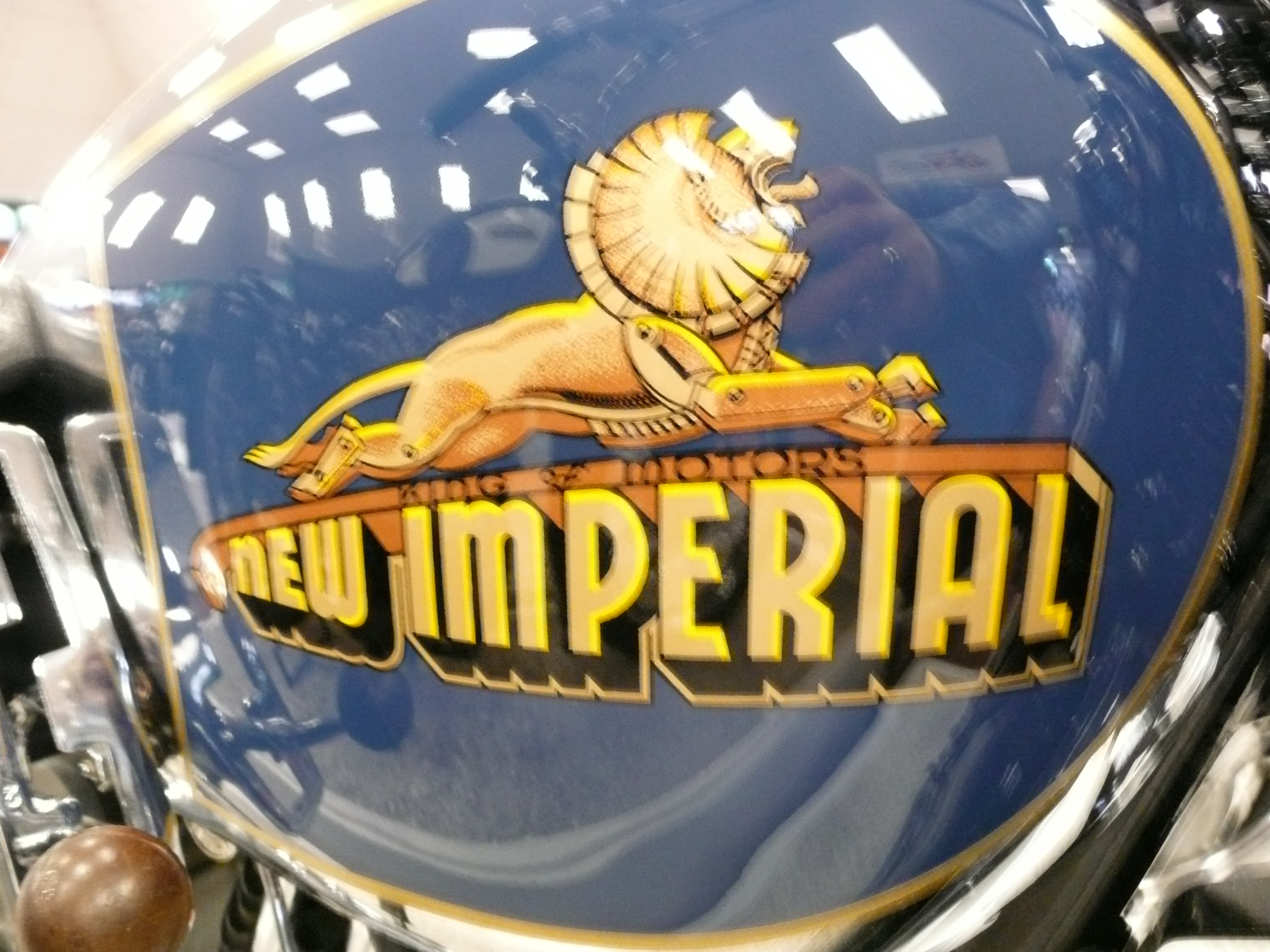
- Industry: Motorcycle
- Founded: 1887
- Founder: Norman Downes
- Defunct: 1939
- Fate: Resurrected by Mutt Motorcycles
- Headquarters: Digbeth Mutt HQ, Birmingham, England
- Key people: Norman Downes
- Products: Motorcycles

New Imperial was a British motorcycle manufacturer founded by Norman Downes in Birmingham, between 1887 and 1901, and became New Imperial Motors Ltd in 1912, when serious production commenced. New Imperial made innovative motorcycles that employed unit construction and sprung heel frames long before they became commonplace, and were moderately successful in competition. The 1920s were a financially successful decade, enabling the innovations of the 1930s that fought decline.

New Imperial suffered financially from the sales-destroying Great Depression of the 1930s, and then the founder died in 1938. New Imperial was sold, and sold again, and then ended production in late 1939, its former facilities subsequently serving the needs of a nation at war.

== Before First World War ==
The history of New Imperial, founded by Norman Downes, goes back to the early days of the bicycle industry in Birmingham. From 1887 New Imperial made bicycle fittings and, later, complete bicycles, possibly after he bought the ailing bicycle business of Hearl and Tonks (founded 1892).

It is also said that he created New Imperial in 1901, but no official record of the earliest company formation has been found. Official records do show the formation of a limited company in 1908 called the New Imperial Cycle Company.

In 1901 New Imperial made their first motorcycle. The engine was mounted forward of the handlebars with a leather belt driving the front wheel. It failed to sell. In 1910 a bike went into production using a 293 cc JAP engine.

=== New Imperial Motors Ltd ===
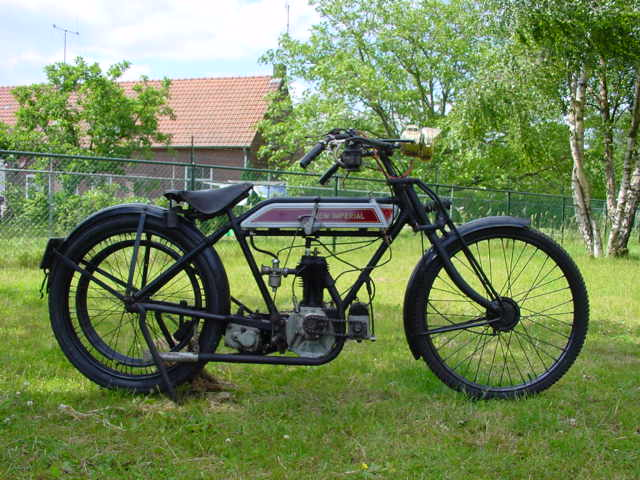
1920 New Imperial Light Tourist 300cc

In 1912 the registration of New Imperial Motors Ltd is recorded, and they offered a range of three motorcycles. A New Imperial ridden by A S Jones in the 1913 Senior TT race was one of the 63 that failed to finish that year. (24 competitors finished.)

In 1914, the 300 cc New Imperial Light Tourist model appeared. Its light weight enabled it to outperform some of the heavier 500 cc bikes of its time. The Light Tourist was the beginning of a line of advanced and innovative motorcycles. A New Imperial ridden by Bert le Vack in the 1914 Senior TT race was one of the 44 that failed to finish that year (22 competitors finished). He had a similar result in 1915.

New Imperial used Precision and JAP engines of 250 to 1000 cc in their motorcycles until 1925 after which they manufactured their own engines of 146 cc to 498 cc. The First World War came and went, and New Imperial continued production.

== After the First World War ==
New Imperial made sales-boosting news with a win in the 250 cc class of the 1921 TT (rider Doug Prentice). This was the first of six Isle of Man Lightweight wins by New Imperial, and there was one Junior victory. (The race was not a TT until 1922, therefore the first win was not a proper TT win, but a 250 cc class win.)

By the mid-1920s New Imperial was doing well, making about 300 machines a month, and continued to do so until the Great Depression of the 1930s. From 1926 they manufactured their own engines. Jessie Hole (later Ennis) was sponsored by Norman Downes to be the company's trials rider in 1927. He hoped that this would sell more bikes to women. In 1929 New Imperial production moved from Princip Street in the Gun Quarter to a 6-acre (24,000 m^{2}) purpose-built facility on Spring Road in Hall Green.

=== Unit construction engines ===
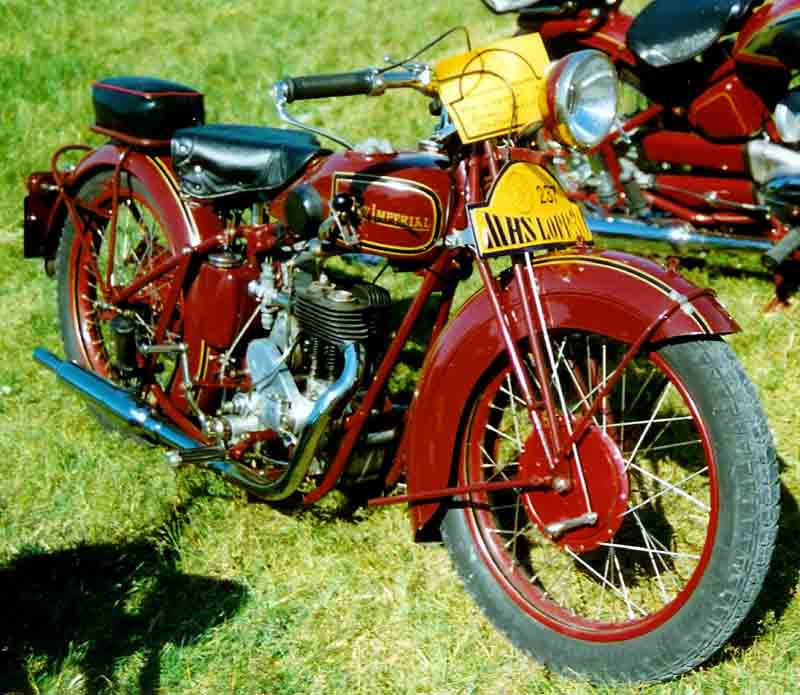
New Imperial

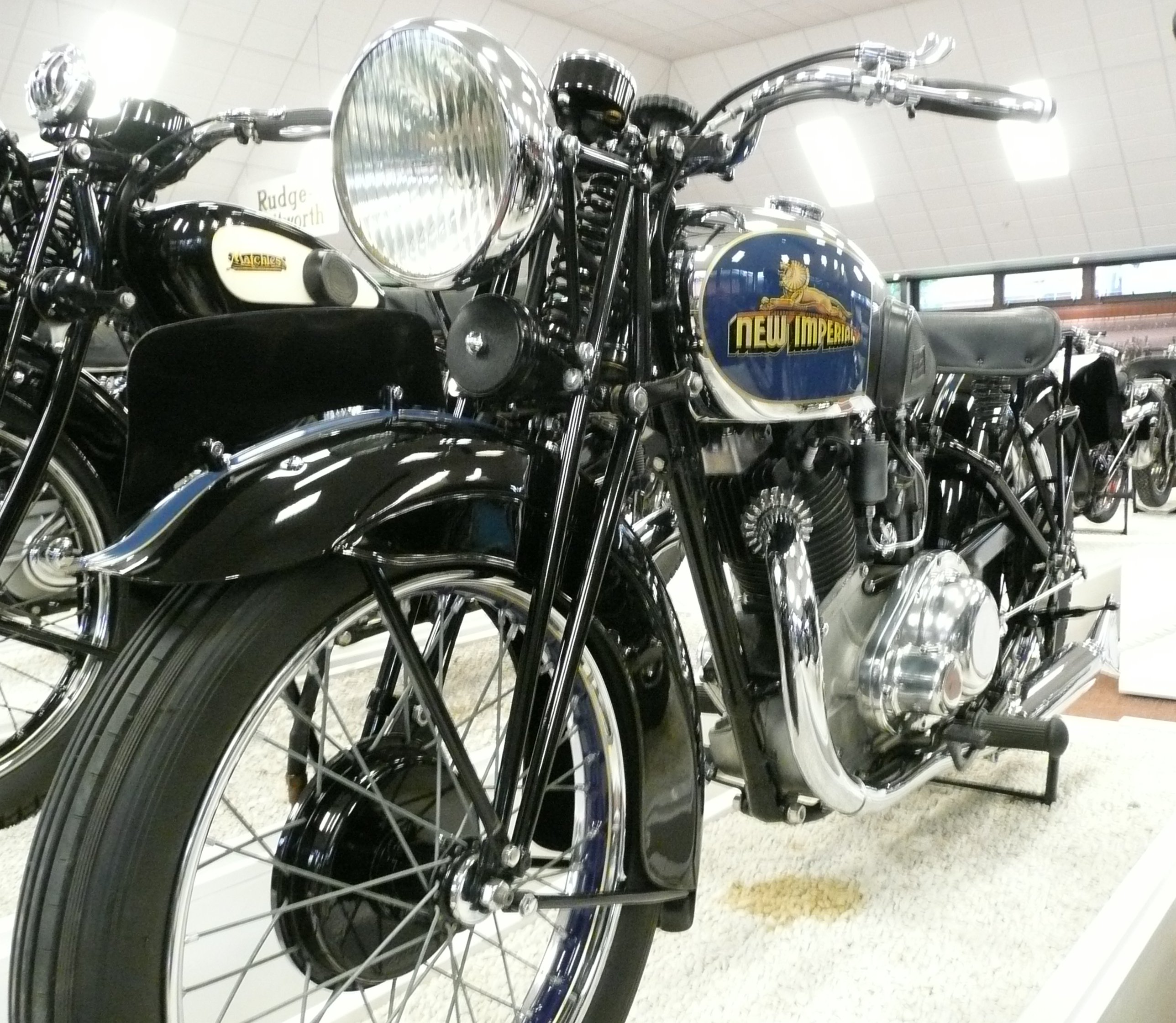
1937 New Imperial 500cc

In 1932, New Imperial started to use unit construction, where the engine crankcase and gearbox are incorporated in the same casting. They made a Unit Minor 150 and Unit Super 250. They continued to use unit-construction, and some models used Bentley and Draper sprung frames, in an era still dominated by rigid frames. By 1938 all New Imperial engines employed unit construction. In 1934 Ginger Wood, riding a New Imperial 500 cc V-twin for one hour, achieved a 102.2 mph (164.4 km/h) average at Brooklands. In September 1935 R J D 'Bob' Burnie of Sketty, Swansea, completed 'The Flying Kilometre' at Southport Sands in the British Open Speed Championship on the same bike with a speed of 100.76 mph.

Bob Foster won the 1936 Lightweight TT handsomely on a unit-construction model. This was the last time that Great Britain won a Lightweight TT. Despite the advanced engineering, and the spectacular TT win by Foster, sales did not improve.

== Final year ==
In 1938 Norman Downes died. New Imperial went into liquidation, and a receiver was appointed by Lloyds Bank on 7 November 1938. The receiver advertised the sale of New Imperial on 18 November.

=== Jack Sangster ===
Jack Sangster, of Ariel and Triumph, announced on 30 December that he had purchased New Imperial and that production would continue, and on 27 January 1939, production resumed.

=== Solomon Clifford Joseph ===
Within a week there were rumours that the company was already being sold to Solomon Joseph, owner of Clifford Covering and Motor Components. The sale was confirmed on 10 February, and production continued. Following the start of World War II, on 22 September 1939 all spare parts were sold to the Colliers, of AMC, who then appointed New Imperial spares dealers.

=== Clifford Aero and Auto Ltd ===
Board of Trade records show New Imperial Ltd officially changed their name to Clifford Aero & Auto Ltd., Aeronautical Engineers, on 6 October 1939, and they then produced aeronautical components for the war effort.

=== Ownership of the name ===
The name, New Imperial, was reportedly sold to BSA at a later date by Sangster, perhaps when he joined the board of BSA in 1951. The most likely explanation for this is that Sangster bought the name back from Clifford Aero and Auto when they changed over to wartime production, or that Sangster had retained the name and allowed Solomon Joseph to trade under it until war broke out and circumstances changed, but these details are not verifiable. Despite plans to revive the name, it was all over for New Imperial. Mutt motorcycles bought the rights to the New Imperial brand and restarted production of New Imperial motorcycles in Birmingham. The 2018 New Imperial Roadster 125 was the first bike produced since 1939. This was later followed by the New Imperial Tracker 125 in 2019.

== See also ==
- New Imperial Model 76
- List of car manufacturers of the United Kingdom
