= Cotton (motorcycle) =

Former British motorcycle manufacturer

Cotton Motor Company
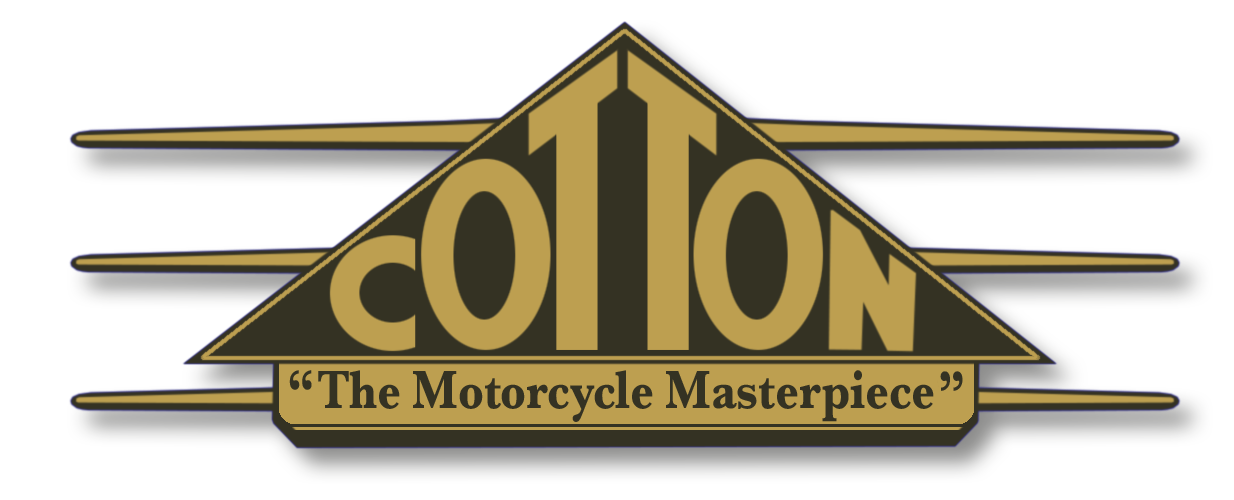
- Founded: 1918
- Founder: Frank Willoughby Cotton
- Defunct: 1980
- Fate: Dissolved
- Headquarters: Gloucester, United Kingdom
- Products: Motorcycles

The Cotton Motor Company, was a British motorcycle manufacturer of 11a Bristol Road, Gloucester, and was founded by Frank Willoughby Cotton in 1918. F.W. presided over the company until his retirement in 1953. The company was reconstituted as E. Cotton (Motorcycles) Ltd, and traded until 1980. The marque was later resurrected in the late 1990s by a business which manufactured replicas of earlier machines.

Today, the trademark Cotton The Motorcycle Masterpiece belongs to an international business.

== The Triangulated Frame ==
By 1913, F.W. Cotton had engaged in hill climbs and trials, and recognised the limitations of the "diamond frame" design, little different from a bicycle. He designed his own, and had examples made by Levis. In 1914 he patented the "triangulated frame" to protect his design that was a Cotton feature until the Second World War. The First World War intervened and it was not until 1918 that the Cotton Motor Company was founded; the first Cotton motorcycle appeared in 1920.

=== Stanley Woods and the TT ===
In 1922 Stanley Woods rode a Blackburne-engined Cotton to fifth in the 350 cc Junior TT, and the following year, won the 1923 Isle of Man TT, averaging 55.73 miles per hour (89.69 km/h), bettering Douglas rider, Manxman Tom Sheard’s winning 500 cc Senior TT time, an average of 53.15 miles per hour (85.54 km/h). Cotton motorcycles took a second and third in the Ultra Lightweight TT, and a second in the Lightweight TT. They only managed a second place in the 1925 Junior TT, and a second place in the lightweight TT but in the 1926 races, awarded the first three places in the Lightweight TT. These victories helped establish Cotton as a race-winning machine, with exceptional handling for its time.

The 1923 win, and consequent full order book, enabled a move to new premises, the Vulcan Works in Quay Street, Gloucester. In 1927 the frame dimensions were altered.

=== Engine and model range ===
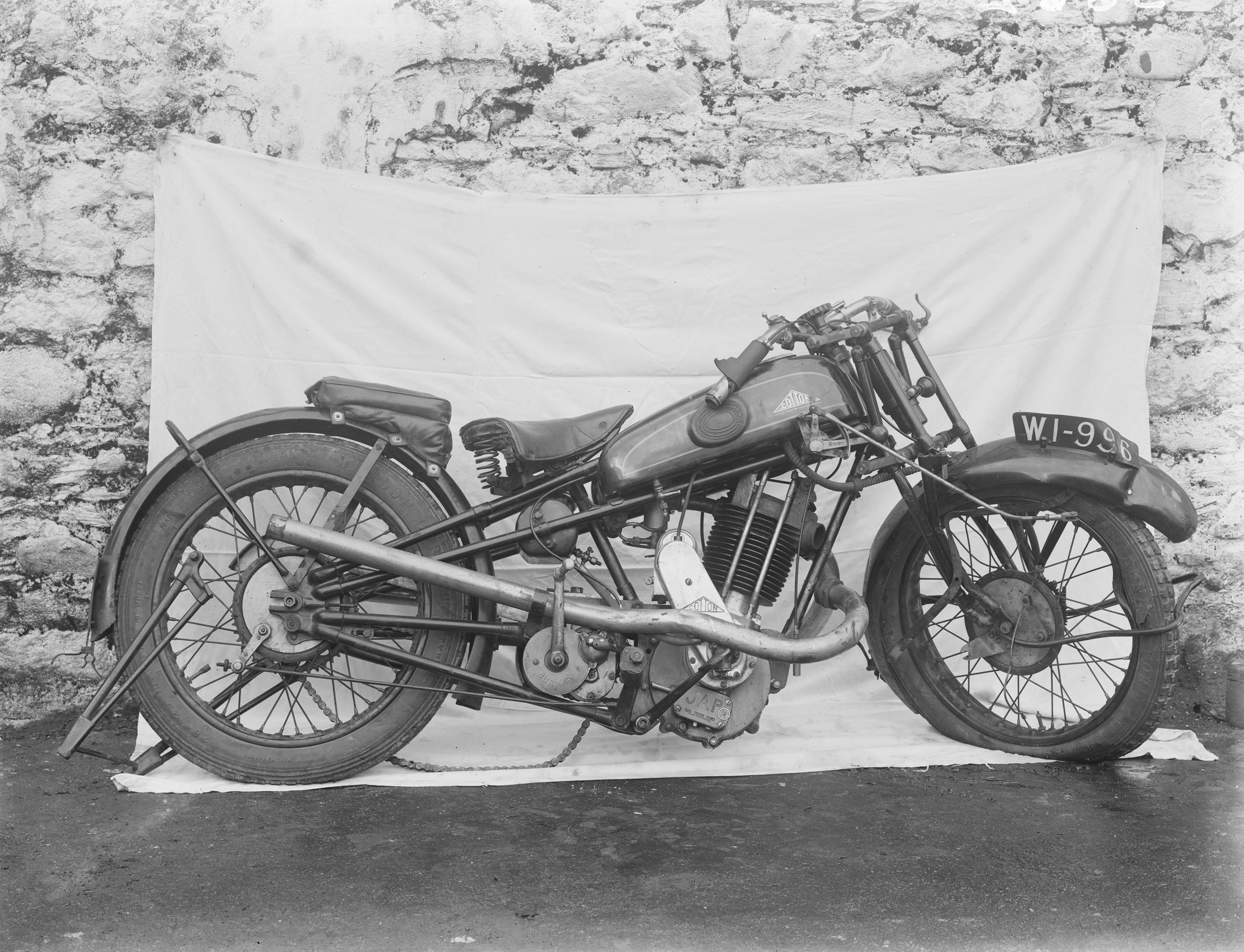
Cotton motorbike shown in 1930, after being involved in an accident.

When the Great Depression came, Cotton responded by offering a wider range of engines in its patented frame, usually with Burman gearboxes.

In 1930, engine choices were:

- 247 cc Villiers two stroke engine
- 295 cc, 348 cc, and 495 cc side-valve Blackburne engines
- 348 cc and 495 cc ohv Blackburne engines
- 292 cc, 348 cc, and 495 cc ohv JAP engines

Four-strokes were available with the exhaust in "single port" or "twin port".

- In 1931 the Blackburne side valve engines disappeared, replaced by the 348 cc and 499 cc Rudge-Python, and a Sturmey-Archer motor entered the range.
- In 1932 all models had saddle tanks and side-valve JAP engines were added. There were two 150 cc models, a sv JAP and a Villiers two-stroke. The biggest capacity model used a 596 cc ohv Blackburne engine. There was a choice of three ohv engine makes, a side valve, and a two stroke.
- For 1933 the range included 250s, in two-stroke Villiers, side-valve JAP, ohv JAP, and ohv Python. There were now 17 Cotton models.
- For 1934 150 and 250 cc ohv Blackburne engines were added, and ohv JAP engines of 245 cc and 596 cc. This increased the range to 19 models.
- In 1935 the Python and side valve JAP engines disappeared, but with a new choice of coil or magneto ignition, Cotton could still claim 16 models.
- In 1936 a "super sports" with a 500 cc JAP engine, and a "super sports" with a Blackburne 25B engine appeared.
- In 1937 the only Blackburne engine available was a 250 cc ohv. There were three new high-camshaft design 250, 350 and 500 cc JAP engined models, with four-speed, foot change gearboxes.
- In 1938 the 150 cc model changed from JAP to unused old stock Blackburne engines. Blackburne itself was now out of production.
- By 1939 there was no 150 cc model.

In 1939 JAP had changed their engine range, introducing new 500 cc and 600 cc, without an external push rod tube, and finned all the way to the base. Unusual external hairpin valve springs, fixed in the middle, with a valve at each end, were used. These were available as standard or deluxe versions. The high cam JAP engines, the 250 cc JAP, and the 150 cc Villiers two stroke continued. Just before the world war, they released a smaller, lighter Cotton with a 122 cc Villiers 9D engine.

When the triangulated rigid frame was introduced in 1920, it was ahead of its time. By 1939, when the sprung heel and rear swingarm frames had begun to appear so rigid frames had seen their day . Vincent had patented a cantilever frame in 1928.

== After the Second World War ==
Continuing with engineering work that sustained the factory during the Second World War, Cotton did not re-enter the motorcycle market at the war's end, but struggled on into the 1950s, when F.W. Cotton decided to retire. The company was re-constituted in 1953 as E. Cotton (Motorcycles) Ltd., after Bill Cotton's first wife Elsie Ellen, and was owned and managed by Pat Onions and Monty Denley.

== E. Cotton (Motorcycles) Ltd ==
As before, Cotton made their own frames, and bought in the rest of the components for assembly. The first machine, produced till 1957, was the Cotton Vulcan, with a Villiers motor.

- In 1955 the Cotton Cotanza was released using a 242 cc Anzani engine, and a new frame with "pivoted-fork" rear suspension. The frame was also used in a new 1955 Vulcan model, fitted with a Villiers 9E engine and three speed gearbox.
- In 1956 that changed to a four speed gearbox, and the Cotanza became available with a 322 cc Anzani twin. A Cotton Trials, a stripped-down version of the Vulcan with competition tyres and no lights was released. The original Vulcan was dropped.
- The only change for 1957 was a Villiers 2T twin added to the Cotanza range.
- There were no further changes until 1959, when all models were fitted with Armstrong leading link forks, and the Villiers 2T twin was dropped.

Other Cotton models included the Herald, Messenger, Double Gloster, Continental, Corsair and Conquest. Cotton became involved in competitive motorcycling, and a range of road, trials and scrambler models were available by the end of 1960.

=== Racing in the sixties ===
In 1961 the 250 Cougar scrambler was released and a works racing team formed, including such riders as Bryan "Badger" Goss and John Draper. The Villiers Starmaker racing engine was introduced in 1962, so Cotton went road racing. The 247 cc Telstar road racer and Conquest were introduced in 1962 and 1964 respectively. Over the next two years, Cottons were winning races again.

=== Loss of Villiers ===
Villiers withdrew from engine supply, and Cotton was forced to source engines from elsewhere. The Cotton Cavalier trials bike used a Minarelli engine, but production was slow. Cotton had been profitably selling bikes in kit form, but changes to legislation proved damaging.

== Closure of the Quay Street, Gloucester factory ==
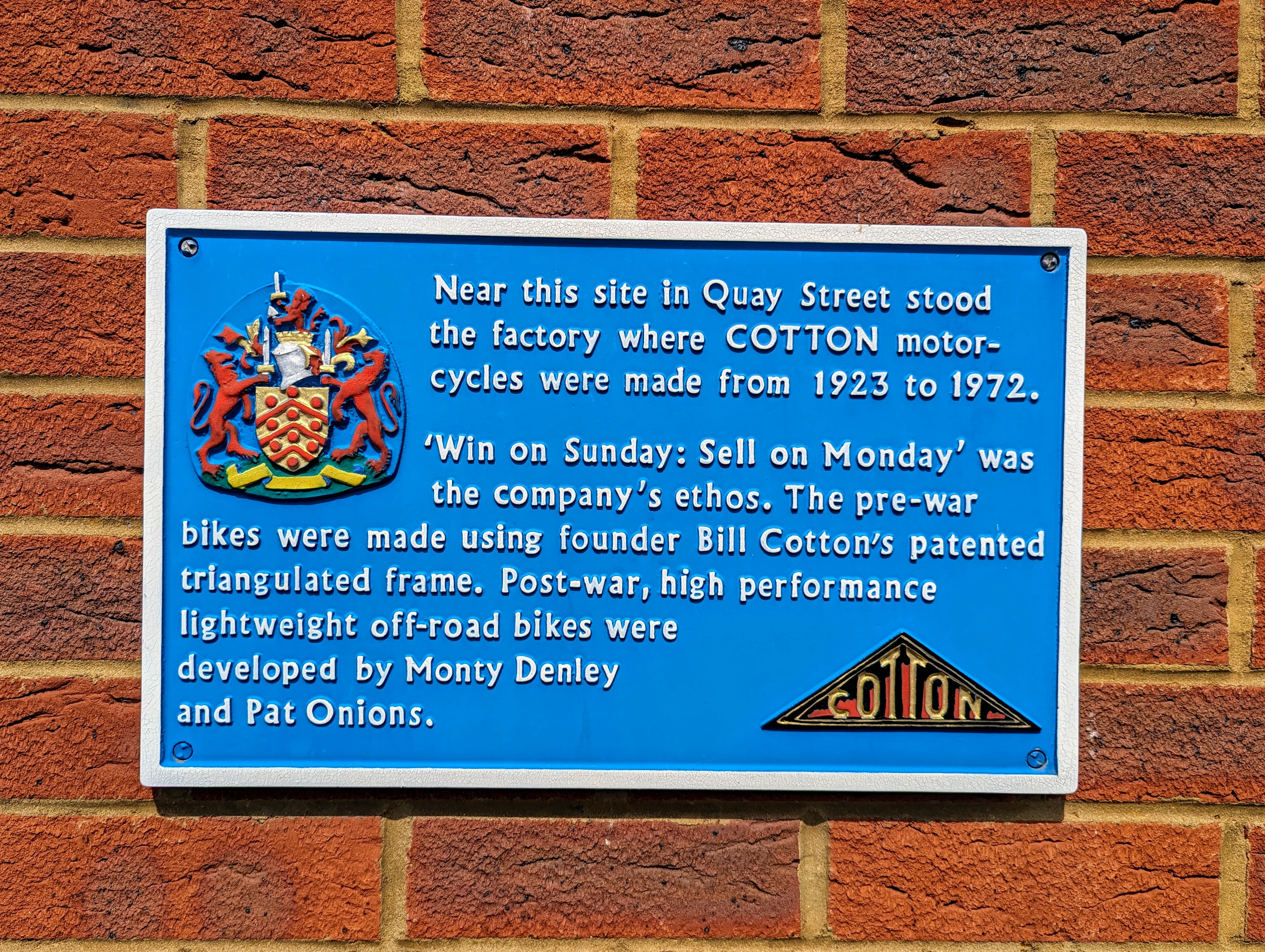
Plaque on Quay Street

The factory moved to Stratton Road in 1970, with diversification into production of the Cotton Sturdy, a three-wheel factory truck. Over the next decade production was moved a number of times, and they managed to produce a good 250 cc racing machine with a Rotax engine. The difficulty of finding a supply of engines after the loss of Villiers was compounded by the appearance of mass-produced Japanese motorcycles in the 1970s.In 1977 the firm moved to premises in Leckhampton but moved back to Gloucester, Merchants Road, in the following year after an unsuccessful bid for a military contract (Gloucestershire Echo article 22/5/1978).

A commemorative plaque to the Cotton name was unveiled in 2013, mounted on the wall of the City Folk Museum, which is close to the old factory location in Quay Street, Gloucester.

== Closure of the Bolton factory ==
The factory moved to Bolton in 1978 but closed in 1980. Following a series of successful 1990s Cotton exhibitions at the Gloucester Folk Museum, the Cotton Owners Club was formed, where a rally is held each summer.

== Replicas ==
In the late '90s AJS Motorcycles Ltd. of Goodworth Clatford, Andover, England produced a series of Cotton replica competition motorcycles including the 250 Cobra Scrambler, Cotton-Triumph 500 Scrambler, Telstar 250 road racer and 250 Starmaker Trials Bike.

These replicas followed the original chassis designs accurately. The frames were T.I.G welded, and employed either AJS Stormer wheel hubs, British Hubs or Grimeca hubs. Betor or Marzocchi front forks were fitted, usually with Sebac rear shocks.

The replicas were very successful on the Pre '65 Moto X circuits and in the hands of classic race competitors.

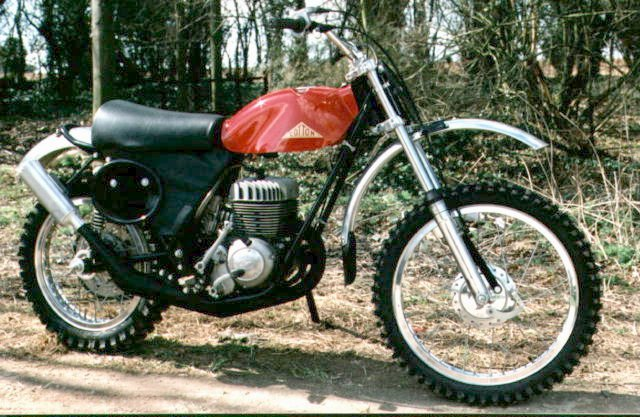
Cotton 250 Cobra replica

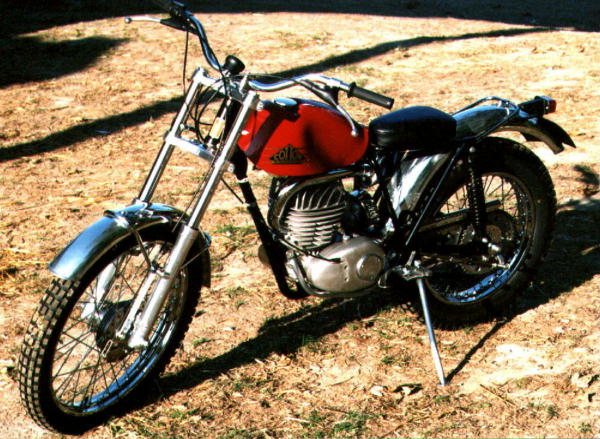
Cotton 250 Trials (Starmaker) replica

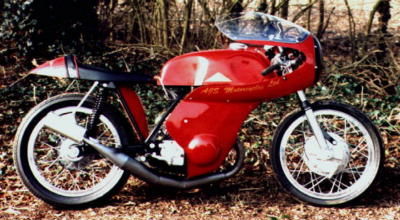
Cotton 250 Telstar replica

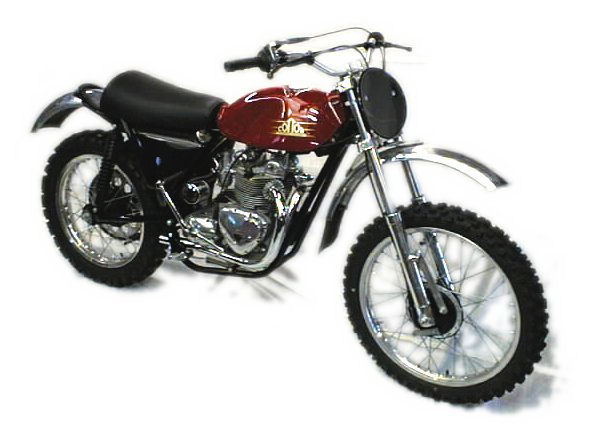
Cotton-Triumph 500 replica
