= Junior TT =

Annual motorcycle race on the Isle of Man

2014 Isle of Man TT Races
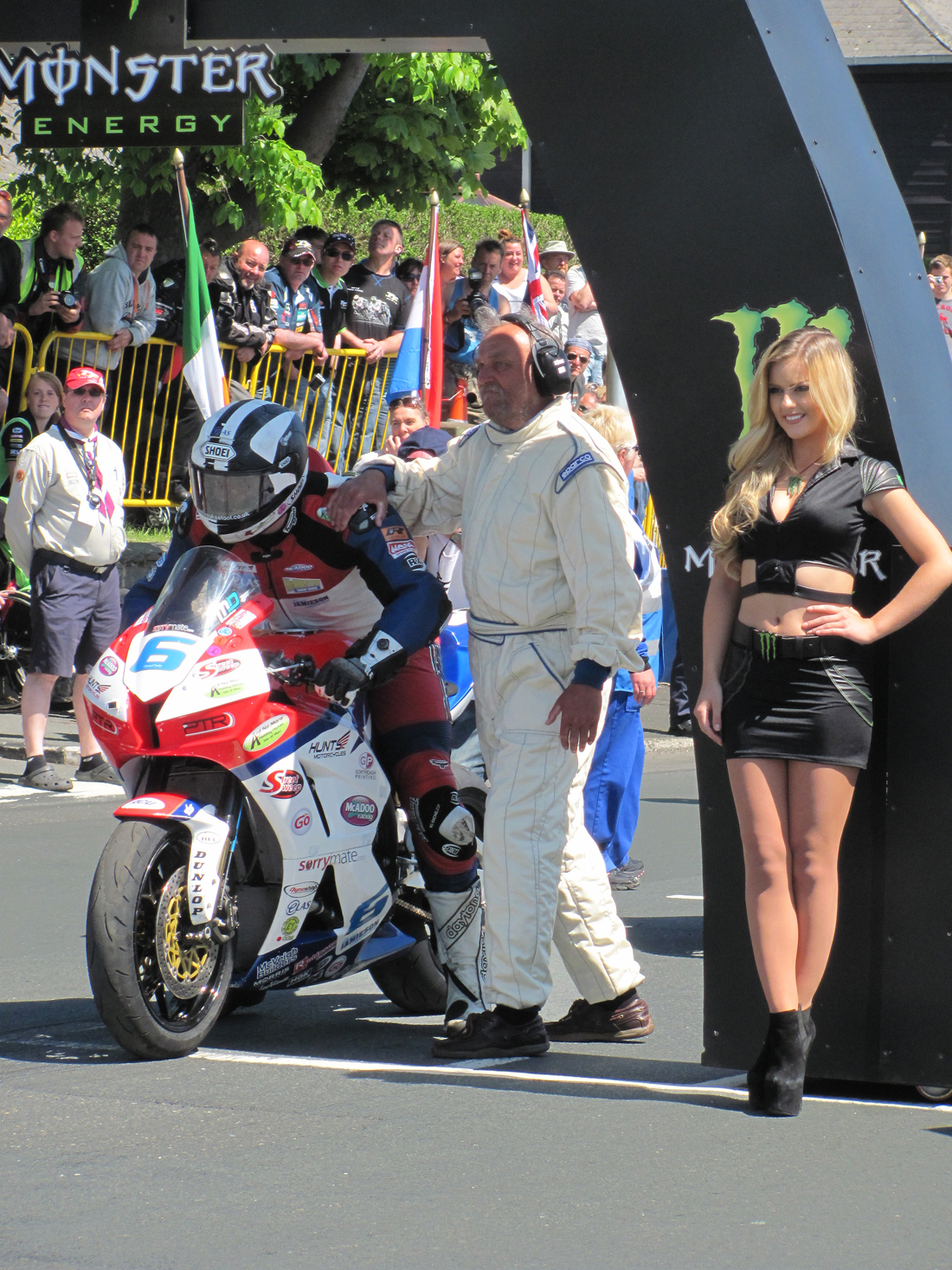
- 2013 Isle of Man TT Supersport TT Race 2 Michael Dunlop (6), 600cc Honda TT Grandstand 5 June 2013

Race details
- Date: 2 & 4 June 2014
- Location: Douglas, Isle of Man

Supersport TT Race 1
Pole Position	Fastest Lap
(England) Gary Johnson	(England) Gary Johnson
125.934 mph	126.732 mph
Podium
1. (England) Gary Johnson
2. (New Zealand) Bruce Anstey	3. (Northern Ireland) Michael Dunlop

Supersport TT Race 2
Pole Position	Fastest Lap
(England) Gary Johnson	(Northern Ireland) Michael Dunlop
125.934 mph	127.403 mph
Podium
1. (Northern Ireland) Michael Dunlop
2. (New Zealand) Bruce Anstey	3. (Northern Ireland) William Dunlop

The Junior TT is a motorcycle road race that takes place during the Isle of Man TT festival; an annual event at the end of May and beginning of June. Between 1949 and 1976 this race was part of the Grand Prix motorcycle racing season.

== Engine capacity ==
The 1911 Isle of Man TT was the first time the Junior TT race took place and was open to 300cc single-cylinder and 340cc twin cylinder motor-cycles and was contested over 5 laps of the new 37.5 mile Mountain Course. The first event on the new course was the Junior TT Race and was contested by 35 entrants. It was won by Percy J. Evans riding a Humber motorcycle in 3 hours, 37 minutes and 7 seconds at an average speed of 41.45 mph.

The 1912 event was the first to limit the Junior TT to only 350 cc machines and this engine capacity prevailed until 1994.

Years	Maximum Engine Capacity
1911	300cc (Single cylinder) 340cc (Twin cylinder)
1912 - 1976	350cc
1977 - 1994	250cc
1995 - 2004	600cc
2005 - Present	600cc (Four cylinder) 675cc (Three cylinder) 955cc (Two cylinder)

== Eligibility ==
=== Entrants ===
- Entrants must be in possession of a valid National Entrants or FIM Sponsors Licence for Road Racing.

=== Machines ===
The 2012 specification for entries into the Junior TT race are defined as;-

- Any machine complying with the following specifications:
  - Supersport TT: (Machines complying with the 2012 FIM Supersport Championships specifications)
    - Over 400cc up to 600cc 4 cylinders 4-stroke
    - Over 600cc up to 675cc 3 cylinders 4-stroke
    - Over 600cc up to 750cc 2 cylinders 4-stroke

=== Official qualification time ===
- 115% of the time set by the third fastest qualifier in the class.

== Speed and lap records ==
The lap record for the Junior TT is 17 minutes and 31.328 seconds, at an average speed of 129.197 mph (207.922 km/h) set by Michael Dunlop on lap 2 of the 2018 Isle of Man TT 600cc Supersport Junior TT Race 1. The race record for a four-lap Junior TT is 1 hour, 11 minutes and 28.059 seconds at an average race speed of 126.703 mph (203.909 km/h) set by Dean Harrison during the 2018 600cc Supersport TT Race 2.

== List of Junior/Supersport TT winners ==
Year	Rider	Manufacturer	Average race speed
1911	(United Kingdom) Percy J. Evans	Humber	41.45 mph
1912	(United Kingdom) W. Harry Bashall	Douglas	39.65 mph
1913	(United Kingdom) Hugh Mason	NUT	43.75 mph
1914	(United Kingdom) Eric Williams	AJS	45.58 mph
1915-1919	Not held		
1920	(United Kingdom) Cyril Williams	AJS	40.74 mph
1921	(United Kingdom) Eric Williams	AJS	52.21 mph
1922	(Isle of Man) Tom Sheard	AJS	54.75 mph
1923	(Republic of Ireland) Stanley Woods	Cotton	55.74 mph
1924	(United Kingdom) Kenneth Twemlow	New Imperial	55.678 mph
1925	(England) Wal Handley	Rex-Acme	65.02 mph
1926	(United Kingdom) Alec Bennett	Velocette	66.704 mph
1927	(England) Freddie Dixon	HRD	67.19 mph
1928	(United Kingdom) Alec Bennett	Velocette	68.65 mph
1929	(United Kingdom) Freddie Hicks	Velocette	69.71 mph
1930	(Republic of Ireland) Henry Tyrell-Smith	Rudge	71.08 mph
1931	(United Kingdom) Tim Hunt	Norton	73.94 mph
1932	(Republic of Ireland) Stanley Woods	Norton	77.16 mph
1933	(Republic of Ireland) Stanley Woods	Norton	78.08 mph
1934	(Scotland) Jimmie Guthrie	Norton	79.16 mph
1935	(Scotland) Jimmie Guthrie	Norton	79.14 mph
1936	(England) Freddie Frith	Norton	80.14 mph
1937	(Scotland) Jimmie Guthrie	Norton	84.43 mph
1938	(Republic of Ireland) Stanley Woods	Velocette	84.08 mph
1939	(Republic of Ireland) Stanley Woods	Velocette	83.19 mph
1940-1946	Not held		
1947	(United Kingdom) Bob Foster	Velocette	80.311 mph
1948	(England) Freddie Frith	Velocette	81.59 mph
1949	(England) Freddie Frith	Velocette	83.15 mph
1950	(Northern Ireland) Artie Bell	Norton	86.33 mph
1951	(England) Geoff Duke	Norton	93.83 mph
1952	(England) Geoff Duke	Norton	90.29 mph
1953	(Federation of Rhodesia and Nyasaland) Ray Amm	Norton	90.52 mph
1954	(New Zealand) Rod Coleman	AJS	91.51 mph
1955	(England) Bill Lomas	Moto Guzzi	92.33 mph
1956	(Australia) Ken Kavanagh	Moto Guzzi	89.29 mph
1957	(Scotland) Bob McIntyre	Gilera	94.99 mph
1958	(England) John Surtees	MV Agusta	93.97 mph
1959	(England) John Surtees	MV Agusta	95.38 mph
1960	(England) John Hartle	MV Agusta	96.70 mph
1961	(England) Phil Read	Norton	95.11 mph
1962	(England) Mike Hailwood	MV Agusta	99.59 mph
1963	(Rhodesia) Jim Redman	Honda	94.91 mph
1964	(Rhodesia) Jim Redman	Honda	98.51 mph
1965	(Rhodesia) Jim Redman	Honda	100.72 mph
1966	(Italy) Giacomo Agostini	MV Agusta	100.87 mph
1967	(England) Mike Hailwood	Honda	104.68 mph
1968	(Italy) Giacomo Agostini	MV Agusta	104.78 mph
1969	(Italy) Giacomo Agostini	MV Agusta	101.81 mph
1970	(Italy) Giacomo Agostini	MV Agusta	101.77 mph
1971	(England) Tony Jefferies	Yamsel	89.91 mph
1972	(Italy) Giacomo Agostini	MV Agusta	102.03 mph
1973	(United Kingdom) Tony Rutter	Yamaha	101.99 mph
1974	(United Kingdom) Tony Rutter	Yamaha	104.44 mph
1975	(England) Charlie Williams	Yamaha	104.38 mph
1976	(England) Chas Mortimer	Yamaha	106.78 mph
1977	(England) Charlie Williams	Yamaha	99.62 mph
1978	(England) Chas Mortimer	Yamaha	100.71 mph
1979	(England) Charlie Williams	Yamaha	105.13 mph
1980	(England) Charlie Williams	Yamaha	102.22 mph
1981	(England) Steve Tonkin	Armstrong	106.21 mph
1982	(Northern Ireland) Con Law	Waddon	105.32 mph
1983	(Northern Ireland) Con Law	EMC	108.09 mph
1984	(Australia) Graeme McGregor	EMC	109.57 mph
1985	(Northern Ireland) Joey Dunlop	Honda	109.91 mph
1986	(Northern Ireland) Steve Cull	Honda	109.62 mph
1987	(Republic of Ireland) Eddie Laycock	EMC	108.52 mph
1988	(Northern Ireland) Joey Dunlop	Honda	111.87 mph
1989	(Northern Ireland) Johnny Rea	Honda	112.12 mph
1990	(Wales) Ian Lougher	Yamaha	115.16 mph
1991	(Northern Ireland) Robert Dunlop	Yamaha	114.89 mph
1992	(Northern Ireland) Brian Reid	Yamaha	115.13 mph
1993	(Northern Ireland) Brian Reid	Yamaha	115.14 mph
1994	(Northern Ireland) Joey Dunlop	Honda	114.67 mph
1995	(Scotland) Iain Duffus	Honda	116.58 mph
1996	(Northern Ireland) Phillip McCallen	Honda	117.65 mph
1997	(Scotland) Ian Simpson	Honda	118.41 mph
1998	(England) Michael Rutter	Honda	114.37 mph
1999	(Scotland) Jim Moodie	Honda	118.11 mph
2000	(England) David Jefferies	Yamaha	119.33 mph
2001	Not held		
2002	(Scotland) Jim Moodie	Yamaha	119.22 mph
2003	(New Zealand) Bruce Anstey	Triumph	120.36 mph
2004	(England) John McGuinness	Yamaha	120.57 mph
2005	(Wales) Ian Lougher	Honda	120.928 mph
2005	(Northern Ireland) Ryan Farquhar	Kawasaki	120.627 mph
2006	(England) John McGuinness	Honda	122.264 mph
2007	(England) Ian Hutchinson	Honda	123.225 mph
2008	(England) Steve Plater	Yamaha	122.338 mph
2008	(New Zealand) Bruce Anstey	Suzuki	123.041 mph
2009	(England) Ian Hutchinson	Honda	124.141 mph
2009	(Northern Ireland) Michael Dunlop	Yamaha	121.416 mph
2010	(England) Ian Hutchinson	Honda	124.677 mph
2010	(England) Ian Hutchinson	Honda	125.161 mph
2011	(New Zealand) Bruce Anstey	Honda	124.232 mph
2011	(England) Gary Johnson	Honda	123.819 mph
2012	(New Zealand) Bruce Anstey	Honda	124.160 mph
2012	(Northern Ireland) Michael Dunlop	Yamaha	123.543 mph
2013	(Northern Ireland) Michael Dunlop	Honda	125.182 mph
2013	(Northern Ireland) Michael Dunlop	Honda	125.997 mph
2014	(England) Gary Johnson	Triumph	125.078 mph
2014	(Northern Ireland) Michael Dunlop	Honda	124.526 mph
2015	(England) Ian Hutchinson	Yamaha	125.451 mph
2015	(England) Ian Hutchinson	Yamaha	125.803 mph
2016	(England) Ian Hutchinson	Yamaha	126.445 mph
2016	(England) Ian Hutchinson	Yamaha	125.905 mph
2017	(Northern Ireland) Michael Dunlop	Yamaha	124.368 mph
2017	Supersport TT 2 Cancelled due to weather conditions		
2018	(Northern Ireland) Michael Dunlop	Honda	126.027 mph
2018	(England) Dean Harrison	Kawasaki	126.703 mph
2019	(Northern Ireland) Lee Johnston	Yamaha	126.449 mph
2019	(England) Peter Hickman	Triumph	127.671 mph
2022	(Northern Ireland) Michael Dunlop	Yamaha	

=== Race winners (riders) ===
Rider	Wins
Ian Hutchinson, Michael Dunlop	8
Giacomo Agostini, Stanley Woods	5
Bruce Anstey, Charlie Williams	4
Joey Dunlop, Freddie Frith, Jimmie Guthrie, Jim Redman	3
Alec Bennett, Brian Reid, Geoff Duke, Mike Hailwood, Gary Johnson, Con Law, Ian Lougher, John McGuinness, Chas Mortimer, Jim Moodie, John Surtees, Eric Williams	2
Rod Coleman, Percy J. Evans, Ryan Farquhar, Peter Hickman, David Jefferies, Lee Johnston, Ken Kavanagh, Dave Leach, Bill Lomas, Phil Mellor, Steve Plater, Michael Rutter, T. M. Sheard, H. G. Tyrell Smith	1

=== Race winners (manufacturers) ===
Marque	Wins
Honda	26
Yamaha	25
Norton	12
MV Agusta	9
Velocette	8
AJS	5
EMC, Triumph	3
Moto Guzzi, Kawasaki	2
Armstrong, Cotton, Douglas, Gilera, Humber, HRD, New Imperial, NUT, Rex-Acme, Rudge-Whitworth, Suzuki, Waddon, Yamsel	1

=== Winners of Junior/Senior Double Isle of Man TT races ===
Year	Name	Make of motorcycle
1931	Tim Hunt	Norton
1932/33	Stanley Woods	Norton
1934	Jimmie Guthrie	Norton
1951	Geoff Duke	Norton
1953	Ray Amm	Norton
1957	Bob McIntyre	Gilera
1958/59	John Surtees	MV Agusta
1967	Mike Hailwood	Honda
1968–70, 1972	Giacomo Agostini	MV Agusta
1985, 1988	Joey Dunlop	Honda
1996	Phillip McCallen	Honda
2000	David Jefferies	Yamaha
2006	John McGuinness	Honda
2010	Ian Hutchinson	Honda
2014	Michael Dunlop	Honda / BMW
2017	Michael Dunlop	Yamaha / Suzuki

== See also ==
- TT Zero
- Lightweight TT
- Ultra-Lightweight TT
- Sidecar TT
- Superstock TT
- Senior TT
