= Senior TT =

Motorcycle road race

Seven-time Senior TT winner John McGuinness in 2007

The Senior Tourist Trophy is a motorcycle road race that takes place during the Isle of Man TT festival, an annual event traditionally held over the last week in May and the first week in June. The Senior TT is the blue ribbon event of the festival that takes place on the Saturday of race week, with "The Marquis de Mouzilly St. Mars trophy" awarded to the winner.

The event was part of the FIM Motorcycle Grand Prix World Championship from 1949 to 1976, before being transferred to the United Kingdom after safety concerns, becoming the British Grand Prix under the FIM from the 1977 GP season.

Until 2012, the Senior TT had never been cancelled except during the two World Wars and during travel restrictions associated with the animal foot and mouth outbreak in 2001. However, during the 2012 TT Races, with inclement weather on the day prior to its traditional Friday race day (8 June), the decision was taken to postpone racing until the following day, Saturday, 9 June. Consequently, a course inspection was made, and following a meeting between riders and officials, the decision was made to cancel the running of the Senior race for safety reasons. The races were cancelled in 2020 and 2021 due to the COVID-19 pandemic.

== Engine capacity ==
The 1911 TT races was the first time the Senior TT race took place and was open to 500 cc single-cylinder and 585 cc twin-cylinder motorcycles. It was won by Oliver Godfrey riding an Indian, at an average speed of 47.63 mph over five laps of the Snaefell Mountain Course that was in use for the first time that year. The 1912 event was the first to limit the Senior TT to 500 cc machines and this engine capacity prevailed until 1984.

The engine capacity was modified from the traditional (up to) 500 cc for two-strokes and is now (up to) 1,000 cc for four-strokes, although 1,000 cc machines were permitted in 1985 and 1986, 1,300 cc in 1987, 1988 and 1989, and 750 cc in 1990–1998.

Years	Maximum Engine Capacity
1911	500cc (Single cylinder) 585cc (Twin cylinder)
1912 - 1984	500cc
1985 - 2004	1,010cc (ACU TT Formula 1 rules)
2005 - Present	1,000cc (FIM Superbike rules)

== Eligibility ==
=== Entrants ===
- Entrants must be in possession of a valid National Entrants or FIM Sponsors Licence for Road Racing.

=== Machines ===
The 2012 specification for entries into the Senior TT race are defined as:

- Any machine complying with the following specifications:
  - TT Superbike: (Machines complying with the 2012 FIM Superbike and Supersport Championships specifications)
    - (Over 750cc up to 1000cc 4 cylinders 4-stroke)
    - (Over 750cc up to 1000cc 3 cylinders 4-stroke)
    - (Over 850cc up to 1200cc 2 cylinders 4-stroke)
  - Supersport Junior TT (without limitation of tyre choice)
    - TT Superstock (without limitation of tyre choice)
    - Other machines admitted at the discretion of the Organisers

=== Official qualification time ===
- 115% of the time set by the third fastest qualifier in the class.

== Speed and lap records ==
The lap record for the Senior TT class is 16 minutes and 42.778 seconds at an average speed of 135.452 mph (217.989 km/h) set by Peter Hickman during the 2018 Senior TT Race. The race record is also held by Hickman in 1 hour, 43 minutes and 08.065 seconds; an average race speed of 131.700 mph (211.951 km/h) achieved during the same six-lap race.

The longest race distance for a FIM Motorcycle Grand Prix World Championship event was the 500 cc 1957 TT race, over eight laps (302.00 Miles), won by Bob McIntyre riding a 500cc Gilera, in 3 hours, 2 minutes and 57.0 seconds at an average race speed of 98.99 mph.

== List of Senior TT podiums ==
	Winner			Second			Third		
	Rider	Machine	Speed	Rider	Machine	Speed	Rider	Machine	Speed
1911	(United Kingdom) Oliver Godfrey	Indian	47.63 mph	(Republic of Ireland) Charles B Franklin	Indian	?? mph	A J Moorhouse	Indian	?? mph
1912	(United Kingdom) Frank A. Applebee	Scott	48.69 mph	J R Haswell	Triumph	?? mph	Harry A Collier	Matchless	?? mph
1913	(United Kingdom) Tim Wood	Scott	48.28 mph	A R Abbott	Rudge	?? mph	A H Alexander	Indian	?? mph
1914	(England) Cyril Pullin	Rudge	49.49 mph	(England) Oliver Godfrey	Indian	?? mph	(England) Howard R Davies	Sunbeam	?? mph
1915-1919	Not held								
1920	(United Kingdom) Tommy de la Hay	Sunbeam	51.79 mph	Doug M Brown	Norton	?? mph	W R Brown	Sunbeam	?? mph
1921	(England) Howard R. Davies	AJS	54.49 mph	(England) Freddie Dixon	Indian	54.02 mph	(England) Bert le Vack	Indian	53.91 mph
1922	(United Kingdom) Alec Bennett	Sunbeam	58.31 mph	Walter Brandish	Triumph	?? mph	Harry Langman	Scott	?? mph
1923	(Isle of Man) Tom Sheard	Douglas	55.55 mph	G M Black	Norton	55.14 mph	(England) Freddie Dixon	Indian	55.01 mph
1924	(United Kingdom) Alec Bennett	Norton	61.64 mph	Harry Langman	Scott	61.23 mph	(England) Freddie Dixon	Douglas	60.17 mph
1925	(England) Howard R. Davies	HRD	66.13 mph	(England) Frank A Longman	AJS	64.95 mph	(United Kingdom) Alec Bennett	Norton	64.05 mph
1926	(Republic of Ireland) Stanley Woods	Norton	67.54 mph	(England) Wal Handley	Rex-Acme	66.31 mph	(England) Frank A Longman	AJS	66.03 mph
1927	(United Kingdom) Alec Bennett	Norton	68.41 mph	(Scotland) Jimmie Guthrie	New Hudson	66.02 mph	Tom Simister	Triumph	65.75 mph
1928	(England) Charlie Dodson	Sunbeam	62.98 mph	(England) George Rowley	AJS	61.27 mph	(England) Tommy L Hatch	Scott	60.89 mph
1929	(England) Charlie Dodson	Sunbeam	72.05 mph	(Republic of Ireland) Alec Bennett	Sunbeam	70.51 mph	(Republic of Ireland) Henry Tyrell-Smith	Rudge	70.25 mph
1930	(England) Wal Handley	Rudge	74.24 mph	(England) Graham Walker	Rudge	73.1 mph	(England) Jimmy H Simpson	Norton	73.7 mph
1931	(United Kingdom) Tim Hunt	Norton	77.90 mph	(Scotland) Jimmie Guthrie	Norton	77.34 mph	(Republic of Ireland) Stanley Woods	Norton	76.35 mph
1932	(Republic of Ireland) Stanley Woods	Norton	79.38 mph	(Scotland) Jimmie Guthrie	Norton	78.47 mph	(England) Jimmy H Simpson	Norton	78.38 mph
1933	(Republic of Ireland) Stanley Woods	Norton	81.04 mph	(England) Jimmy H Simpson	Norton	80.41 mph	(England) Tim Hunt	Norton	80.16 mph
1934	(Scotland) Jimmie Guthrie	Norton	78.01 mph	(England) Jimmy H Simpson	Norton	75.27 mph	(Northern Ireland) Walter F Rusk	Velocette	73.27 mph
1935	(Republic of Ireland) Stanley Woods	Moto Guzzi	84.68 mph	(Scotland) Jimmie Guthrie	Norton	84.65 mph	(Northern Ireland) Walter F Rusk	Norton	83.53 mph
1936	(Scotland) Jimmie Guthrie	Norton	85.80 mph	(Republic of Ireland) Stanley Woods	Velocette	85.66 mph	(England) Freddie Frith	Norton	84.49 mph
1937	(England) Freddie Frith	Norton	88.21 mph	(Republic of Ireland) Stanley Woods	Velocette	88.09 mph	(United Kingdom) John H White	Norton	83.97 mph
1938	(United Kingdom) Harold Daniell	Norton	89.11 mph	(Republic of Ireland) Stanley Woods	Velocette	88.99 mph	(England) Freddie Frith	Norton	88.98 mph
1939	(Nazi Germany) Georg Meier	BMW	89.38 mph	(England) Jock West	BMW	88.22 mph	(England) Freddie Frith	Norton	87.96 mph
1940-1946	Not held								
1947	(United Kingdom) Harold Daniell	Norton	82.813 mph	(United Kingdom) Artie Bell	Norton	82.656 mph	(United Kingdom) Peter Goodman	Velocette	82.463 mph
1948	(Northern Ireland) Artie Bell	Norton	84.969 mph	(England) Bill Doran	Norton	80.338 mph	(United Kingdom) Jock A Weddell	Norton	79.564 mph
1949	(United Kingdom) Harold Daniell	Norton	86.93 mph	(United Kingdom) Johnny Lockett	Norton	86.19 mph	(Republic of Ireland) Ernie Lyons	Velocette	85.5 mph
1950	(England) Geoff Duke	Norton	92.27 mph	(Northern Ireland) Artie Bell	Norton	90.86 mph	(United Kingdom) Johnny Lockett	Norton	90.37 mph
1951	(England) Geoff Duke	Norton	93.83 mph	(England) Bill Doran	AJS	91.44 mph	(United Kingdom) Cromie McCandless	Norton	90.33 mph
1952	(Republic of Ireland) Reg Armstrong	Norton	92.97 mph	(England) Leslie Graham	MV Agusta	92.72 mph	(Federation of Rhodesia and Nyasaland) Ray Amm	Norton	92.4 mph
1953	(Federation of Rhodesia and Nyasaland) Ray Amm	Norton	93.85 mph	(England) Jack Brett	Norton	93.74 mph	(Republic of Ireland) Reg Armstrong	Gilera	93.62 mph
1954	(Federation of Rhodesia and Nyasaland) Ray Amm	Norton	88.12 mph	(England) Geoff Duke	Gilera	87.19 mph	(England) Jack Brett	Norton	86.04 mph
1955	(England) Geoff Duke	Gilera	97.93 mph	(Republic of Ireland) Reg Armstrong	Gilera	96.74 mph	(Australia) Ken Kavanagh	Guzzi	95.16 mph
1956	(England) John Surtees	MV Agusta	96.57 mph	(England) John Hartle	Norton	95.69 mph	(England) Jack Brett	Norton	94.96 mph
1957	(Scotland) Bob McIntyre	Gilera	98.99 mph	(England) John Surtees	MV Agusta	97.86 mph	(Australia) Bob Brown	Gilera	95.81 mph
1958	(England) John Surtees	MV Agusta	98.63 mph	(England) Bob Anderson	Norton	95.4 mph	(Australia) Bob Brown	Norton	95.25 mph
1959	(England) John Surtees	MV Agusta	87.94 mph	(Scotland) Alistair King	Norton	85.5 mph	(Australia) Bob Brown	Norton	83.0 mph
1960	(England) John Surtees	MV Agusta	102.44 mph	(England) John Hartle	MV Agusta	100.44 mph	(England) Mike Hailwood	Norton	98.29 mph
1961	(England) Mike Hailwood	Norton	100.61 mph	(Scotland) Bob McIntyre	Norton	99.2 mph	(Australia) Tom_Phillis	Norton	98.78 mph
1962	(Federation of Rhodesia and Nyasaland) Gary Hocking	MV Agusta	103.51 mph	(United Kingdom) Ellis Boyce	Norton	96.27 mph	(United Kingdom) Fred Stevens	Norton	96.24 mph
1963	(England) Mike Hailwood	MV Agusta	104.64 mph	(England) John Hartle	Gilera	103.67 mph	(England) Phil Read	Gilera	100.1 mph
1964	(England) Mike Hailwood	MV Agusta	100.95 mph	(England) Derek Minter	Norton	98.47 mph	(United Kingdom) Fred Stevens	Matchless	96.4 mph
1965	(England) Mike Hailwood	MV Agusta	91.69 mph	(England) Joe Dunphy	Norton	90.28 mph	(Canada) Mike Duff	Matchless	88.09 mph
1966	(England) Mike Hailwood	Honda	103.11 mph	(Italy) Giacomo Agostini	MV Agusta	101.09 mph	(United Kingdom) Chris Conn	Norton	95.37 mph
1967	(England) Mike Hailwood	Honda	105.62 mph	(England) Peter Williams	Matchless	99.64 mph	(United Kingdom) Steve Spencer	Norton	98.59 mph
1968	(Italy) Giacomo Agostini	MV Agusta	101.63 mph	(United Kingdom) Brian Ball	Seeley	95.57 mph	(United Kingdom) Barry Randle	Norton	95.58 mph
1969	(Italy) Giacomo Agostini	MV Agusta	104.75 mph	(United Kingdom) Alan Barnett	Metisse	98.28 mph	(United Kingdom) Tom Dickie	Seeley	97.92 mph
1970	(Italy) Giacomo Agostini	MV Agusta	101.52 mph	(England) Peter Williams	Matchless	97.76 mph	(United Kingdom) Bill Smith	Kawasaki	96.26 mph
1971	(Italy) Giacomo Agostini	MV Agusta	102.59 mph	(England) Peter Williams	Matchless	98.4 mph	(Canada) Frank Perris	Suzuki	96.51 mph
1972	(Italy) Giacomo Agostini	MV Agusta	104.02 mph	(Italy) Alberto Pagani	MV Agusta	98.13 mph	(England) Mick Grant	Kawasaki	97.03 mph
1973	(Australia) Jack Findlay	Suzuki	101.55 mph	(England) Peter Williams	Norton	100.62 mph	(United Kingdom) Charlie Sanby	Suzuki	100.27 mph
1974	(United Kingdom) Phil Carpenter	Yamaha	96.99 mph	(England) Charlie Williams	Yamaha	96.31 mph	(England) Tony Rutter	Yamaha	94.35 mph
1975	(England) Mick Grant	Kawasaki	100.27 mph	(England) John G. Williams	Yamaha	99.88 mph	(England) Chas Mortimer	Yamaha	98.15 mph
1976	(Northern Ireland) Tom Herron	Yamaha	105.15 mph	(Australia) Ian Richards	Yamaha	105.11 mph	(Northern Ireland) Billy Guthrie	Yamaha	104.84 mph
1977	(England) Phil Read	Suzuki	106.97 mph	(Northern Ireland) Tom Herron	Yamaha	105.67 mph	(England) Eddie Roberts	Yamaha	104.24 mph
1978	(Northern Ireland) Tom Herron	Suzuki	111.74 mph	(Northern Ireland) Billy Guthrie	Suzuki	107.72 mph	(England) Chas Mortimer	Yamaha	107.11 mph
1979	(England) Mike Hailwood	Suzuki	111.75 mph	(England) Tony Rutter	Suzuki	109.84 mph	(New Zealand) Dennis Ireland	Suzuki	109.43 mph
1980	(New Zealand) Graeme Crosby	Suzuki	109.65 mph	(Northern Ireland) Steve Cull	Suzuki	108.87 mph	(New Zealand) Steve Ward	Suzuki	108.58 mph
1981	(England) Mick Grant	Suzuki	106.14 mph	(Northern Ireland) Donny Robinson	Yamaha	104.05 mph	(England) John Newbold	Suzuki	103.77 mph
1982	(Northern Ireland) Norman Brown	Suzuki	110.98 mph	(South Africa) Jon Ekerold	Suzuki	110.85 mph	(New Zealand) Dennis Ireland	Suzuki	109.25 mph
1983	(England) Rob McElnea	Suzuki	114.81 mph	(Northern Ireland) Con Law	Suzuki	112.97 mph	(Northern Ireland) Joey Dunlop	Honda	112.77 mph
1984	(England) Rob McElnea	Suzuki	115.66 mph	(England) Roger Marshall	Honda	112.65 mph	(England) Trevor Nation	Suzuki	112.05 mph
1985	(Northern Ireland) Joey Dunlop	Honda	113.69 mph	(England) Roger Marshall	Honda	113.43 mph	Mark Johns	Suzuki	111.31 mph
1986	(England) Roger Burnett	Honda	113.98 mph	(England) Geoff Johnson	Honda	112.91 mph	(England) Barry Woodland	Suzuki	112.47 mph
1987	(Northern Ireland) Joey Dunlop	Honda	99.85 mph	(England) Geoff Johnson	Yamaha	98.79 mph	(England) Roger Marshall	Suzuki	97.9 mph
1988	(Northern Ireland) Joey Dunlop	Honda	117.38 mph	(Scotland) Steve Hislop	Yamaha	116.53 mph	(England) Geoff Johnson	Suzuki	115.84 mph
1989	(Scotland) Steve Hislop	Honda	118.23 mph	(England) Nick Jefferies	Yamaha	117.58 mph	(Australia) Graeme McGregor	Honda	116.38 mph
1990	(England) Carl Fogarty	Honda	110.95 mph	(England) Trevor Nation	Norton	109.76 mph	(England) Dave Leach	Yamaha	109.61 mph
1991	(Scotland) Steve Hislop	Honda	121.09 mph	(Northern Ireland) Joey Dunlop	Honda	119.66 mph	(Northern Ireland) Phillip McCallen	Honda	118.35 mph
1992	(Scotland) Steve Hislop	Norton	121.28 mph	(England) Carl Fogarty	Yamaha	121.2 mph	(Northern Ireland) Robert Dunlop	Norton	119.1 mph
1993	(Northern Ireland) Phillip McCallen	Honda	118.32 mph	(England) Nick Jefferies	Honda	117.55 mph	(New Zealand) Steve Ward	Honda	116.31 mph
1994	(Scotland) Steve Hislop	Honda	119.25 mph	(Northern Ireland) McCallen, Phillip	Honda	117.96 mph	(Northern Ireland) Joey Dunlop	Honda	116.75 mph
1995	(Northern Ireland) Joey Dunlop	Honda	119.11 mph	(Scotland) Iain Duffus	Ducati	118.53 mph	(New Zealand) Steve Ward	Honda	118.25 mph
1996	(Northern Ireland) Phillip McCallen	Honda	119.76 mph	(Northern Ireland) Joey Dunlop	Honda	118.5 mph	(England) Nick Jefferies	Honda	118.47 mph
1997	(Northern Ireland) Phillip McCallen	Honda	119.45 mph	(Scotland) Jim Moodie	Honda	119.4 mph	(Scotland) Ian Simpson	Honda	118.62 mph
1998	(Scotland) Ian Simpson	Honda	119.79 mph	(England) Bob Jackson	Kawasaki	119.72 mph	(Northern Ireland) James Courtney	Honda	119.19 mph
1999	(England) David Jefferies	Yamaha	121.27 mph	(Scotland) Iain Duffus	Yamaha	120.44 mph	(Wales) Ian Lougher	Honda	120.42 mph
2000	(England) David Jefferies	Yamaha	121.95 mph	(England) Michael Rutter	Yamaha	121.21 mph	(Northern Ireland) Joey Dunlop	Honda	120.66 mph
2001	Cancelled due to foot-and-mouth outbreak								
2002	(England) David Jefferies	Suzuki	124.74 mph	(Wales) Ian Lougher	Suzuki	124.32 mph	(England) John McGuinness	Honda	123.45 mph
2003	(Northern Ireland) Adrian Archibald	Suzuki	124.53 mph	(England) John McGuinness	Ducati	123.93 mph	(Wales) Ian Lougher	Honda	123.21 mph
2004	(Northern Ireland) Adrian Archibald	Suzuki	123.81 mph	(New Zealand) Bruce Anstey	Suzuki	122.96 mph	(Isle of Man) Gary Carswell	Suzuki	120.64 mph
2005	(England) John McGuinness	Yamaha	124.324 mph	(Wales) Ian Lougher	Honda	123.67 mph	(England) Guy Martin	Honda	123.32 mph
2006	(England) John McGuinness	Honda	126.178 mph	(Australia) Donald Cameron	Honda	125.68 mph	(New Zealand) Bruce Anstey	Suzuki	125.59 mph
2007	(England) John McGuinness	Honda	127.255 mph	(England) Guy Martin	Honda	126.6 mph	(England) Ian Hutchinson	Honda	125.67 mph
2008	(England) John McGuinness	Honda	127.186 mph	(Australia) Donald Cameron	Suzuki	126.18 mph	(England) Ian Hutchinson	Yamaha	125.19 mph
2009	(England) Steve Plater	Honda	128.278 mph	(Isle of Man) Conor Cummins	Kawasaki	127.88 mph	(England) Gary Johnson	Honda	126.87 mph
2010	(England) Ian Hutchinson	Honda	128.607 mph	(Northern Ireland) Ryan Farquhar	Kawasaki	127.46 mph	(New Zealand) Bruce Anstey	Suzuki	126.4 mph
2011	(England) John McGuinness	Honda	128.426 mph	(England) Guy Martin	Suzuki	128.28 mph	(New Zealand) Bruce Anstey	Honda	128.1 mph
2012	Cancelled due to weather conditions								
2013	(England) John McGuinness	Honda	128.943 mph	(Northern Ireland) Michael Dunlop	Honda	128.73 mph	(New Zealand) Bruce Anstey	Honda	128.58 mph
2014	(Northern Ireland) Michael Dunlop	BMW	128.680 mph	(Isle of Man) Conor Cummins	Honda	128.39 mph	(England) Guy Martin	Suzuki	128.201 mph
2015	(England) John McGuinness	Honda	130.481 mph	(England) James Hillier	Kawasaki	130.03 mph	(England) Ian Hutchinson	Kawasaki	129.83 mph
2016	(Northern Ireland) Michael Dunlop	BMW	130.685 mph	(England) Ian Hutchinson	BMW	130.029 mph	(England) John McGuinness	Honda	129.388 mph
2017	(Northern Ireland) Michael Dunlop	Suzuki	130.456 mph	(England) Peter Hickman	BMW	130.04 mph	(England) Dean Harrison	Kawasaki	129.724 mph
2018	(England) Peter Hickman	BMW	131.700 mph	(England) Dean Harrison	Kawasaki	131.656 mph	(Isle of Man) Conor Cummins	Honda	129.554 mph
2019	(England) Dean Harrison	Kawasaki	130.824 mph	(England) Peter Hickman	BMW	129.719 mph	(Isle of Man) Conor Cummins	Honda	129.599 mph
2020	Cancelled due to COVID-19								
2021	Cancelled due to COVID-19								
2022	(England) Peter Hickman	BMW	129.432 mph	(England) Dean Harrison	Kawasaki	129.085 mph	(Isle of Man) Conor Cummins	Honda	128.745 mph
2023	(England) Peter Hickman	BMW	132.526 mph	(England) Dean Harrison	Kawasaki	132.097 mph	(Northern Ireland) Michael Dunlop	Honda	131.661 mph
2024	(England) Davey Todd	BMW	132.847 mph	(Australia) Josh Brookes	BMW	131.589 mph	(England) Dean Harrison	Honda	130.759 mph
2025	Cancelled due to weather conditions								

=== Multiple winners (riders) ===
Rider	Wins
Mike Hailwood, John McGuinness	7
Giacomo Agostini	5
Joey Dunlop, Steve Hislop, John Surtees, Stanley Woods	4
Alec Bennett, Harold Daniell, Geoff Duke, Michael Dunlop, David Jefferies, Phillip McCallen, Peter Hickman	3
Adrian Archibald, Ray Amm, Howard R Davies, Charlie Dodson, Mick Grant, Jimmie Guthrie, Tom Herron, Rob McElnea	2

=== Multiple winners (manufacturers) ===
Marque	Wins
Honda	23
Norton	20
MV Agusta	13
Suzuki	13
BMW	7
Yamaha, Sunbeam	5
Gilera, Kawasaki, Rudge, Scott	2

== See also ==
- TT Zero
- Lightweight TT
- Ultra-Lightweight TT
- Sidecar TT
- Junior TT
- Superstock TT
