= Howard R. Davies =

English motorcycle racing champion and motorcycle designer

- Davies sitting on his historic 1921 AJS 350 cc Senior TT race winning machine
- Born: 27 June 1895; Balsall Heath, Birmingham
- Died: 3 January 1973 (Age 77); Solihull
- Occupations: Motorcycle designer and manufacturer
- Spouse: Maisie Davies

Howard R. Davies (27 June 1895 – 3 January 1973), was an English motorcycle racing champion, motorcycle designer and originator of the 'HRD' marque which later became Vincent-HRD motorcycles. He died in January 1973.

== Early life ==
Howard Raymond Davies was born at 351 Ladypool Road, Balsall Heath, Birmingham. His parents, Frank and Bertha, then moved to Wolverhampton where Howard attended Wolverhampton Higher Grade School. He was a good swimmer, won swimming medals, rode horses and hunted, and drummed in a band.

When Davies left school, he became an apprentice with AJS. He gained motorcycle building experience, but really wanted to go racing. AJS were fully occupied filling orders at the time and racing had no priority. Sunbeam had a good racing team, but had a no-staff-poaching agreement with AJS, so Davies moved to Clyno as a tester, and shortly thereafter moved to Sunbeam.

== Racing for Sunbeam ==
The Sunbeam team of 1914 consisted of Tommy de la Hay, Vernon Busby, Howard Davies, and Charlie Noakes. Howard was entered in the Scottish Six Days Trial on a 6 hp AJS V-twin combination. He did well initially, but damaged his frame on the fourth day. He stayed for the rest of the event, but found on his return to work that such behaviour was not tolerated, and was sacked.

Davies worked briefly for Diamond before managing to find his way back to Sunbeam. He was then entered for the Senior race at the 1914 Isle of Man Tourist Trophy (TT). He finished in second place, and Sunbeam won the team prize. He did well in other events that year, like the Coventry and Warwick Club trial. Davies won a gold cup for best performance of the day, and a silver cup for best sidecar performance.

Davies and his family lived at 'Darley Dale', Crowther Road, Wolverhampton at the time.

== War Service ==
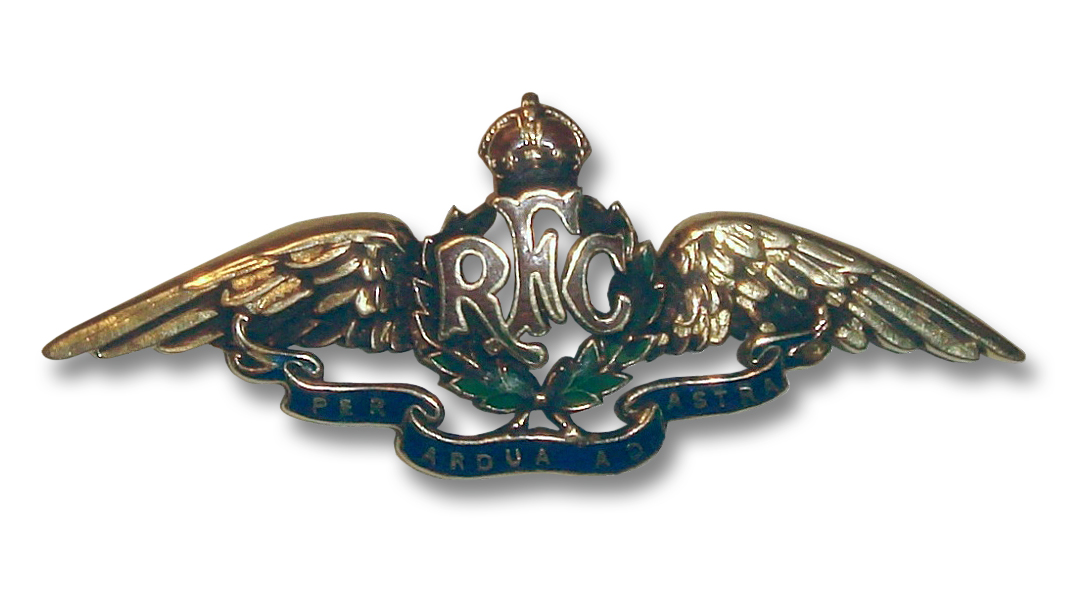
Royal Flying Corps cap badge

When World War I broke out, Davies joined the army and reported to Aldershot in early October to join the Royal Engineers. For 12 months he served as a despatch rider and served in France. On return to England he was given a Commission and posted to Dunstable. He then transferred to the Royal Flying Corps, where he gained a Royal Aero Club Pilot's Certificate, at the Ruislip Military School on 29 July 1916, and was promptly posted to France.

Davies flew RE8 aircraft for 34 Squadron, at Villers-Bretonneux, artillery spotting and was shot down twice. On the first occasion he found his way back to his own lines, but the second time he and Lieutenant J R Samuel were captured at Karlsruhe becoming prisoners of war.

Initially listed as missing, it was then announced that Davies had been killed in action. An obituary appeared in May, 1917 in Motor Cycling magazine, whereupon it emerged that Howard had actually been taken prisoner. He attempted to escape a number of times, once by tunnel, but was unsuccessful.

== Racing for AJS ==
Returning to England after the War, Davies was demobilised in June 1919. His first post-War job was with Aston Motor Accessories of Wolverhampton. He then moved to AMAC Carburettors and began again to ride part-time for AJS. He joined the AJS team for the 1920 Isle of Man TT, and was entered for both the Junior and Senior. The 2.75 hp (2.05 kW) AJS machines suffered engine problems and he had to retire early in both events with broken valves.

In 1920, Davies had many competition successes. In July, riding an AJS in the Scottish Six Day trial, he won the gold medal at Stile Kop, making the fastest time, won another gold medal in the Darlington ACU trial, and broke 14 records at Brooklands, including flying kilometre, flying mile, and average mean speed.

By the end of the year, Davies became the full-time AJS Competitions Manager.

Davies became involved in TT machine development, and by early 1921 the TT machinery was much improved. The 1921 AJS team obtained 1st, 2nd, 3rd, 4th, 6th and 8th places in the Junior 1921 TT event. The winner was Eric Williams. Davies finished in second place, even after having a puncture in the second lap. He finished first in the Senior TT on a 350, a full two minutes ahead of the runner-up, Freddie Dixon on an 'Indian'. This was the first time a 350 cc motorcycle won the Senior.

In trials, Davies won the team event, with Harry Harris and Eric Williams in the ACU six day and the gold medal.

On 24 May 1921, Davies broke four world records at Brooklands:

- 50 miles (80 km) at 66.5 mph (107.0 km/h)
- 1 hour at 66.09 mph (106.36 km/h)
- 100 miles (160 km) at 64.68 mph (104.09 km/h)
- 2 hours at 65.3 mph (105.1 km/h)

The 1922 and 1923 TTs, however, were disasters. With the AJS machines suffering engine problems, he did not manage to finish a race. Davies left AJS in 1923 and moved to Hutchinson Tyres.

== Freelance ==
Davies accepted an offer to ride an OEC in the 1924 TT, but the machine failed after only three laps.

== HRD Motors ==
Davies had often thought of building his own motorcycle, and perhaps influenced by the many mechanical failures he had racing the bikes of the day, decided to make his own. Howard left Hutchinson Tyres in August 1924 to set up HRD Motors using the slogan "Produced by a Rider". The company survived for just over three years.

Davies rode his own motorcycles at the 1925 Isle of Man TT, coming second in the Junior and winning the Senior.

In January 1928, the company went into voluntary liquidation. The name was purchased by Phil Vincent, who then established a new venture as Vincent-HRD.

== After HRD ==
After HRD Motors closed, Davies went through a number of motor industry jobs. He worked first at Alvis, then Meadows Engines, and then Bill Lyon's Swallow and Coachbuilding Company at Coventry. He went into business as a manufacturers agent, covering cars, motorcycles and allied industries.

By this time, Davies was living in Southbank Road, Kenilworth. Later, he would move to his final home in Warwick Road, Chadwick End, Solihull.

Davies continued to attend TT riders reunions, which started in 1937, and would visit Mallory Park with Albert Clarke. On one of these occasions, he got to ride on the track, on an HRD model HD75 and an AJS.

== Death and funeral ==
Davies died at home on 3 January 1973, of cancer. His wife Maisie died two days later. They had a joint funeral at the Robin Hood Crematorium in Solihull.
