= 1934 Isle of Man TT =

Annual motorcycle racing event

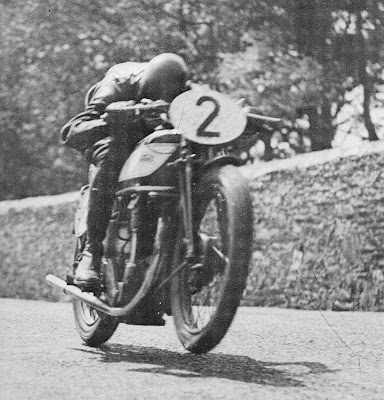
Senior TT and Junior TT winner Jimmie Guthrie (pictured during the Junior TT)

For the 1934 Isle of Man TT Races, despite the winning of four TT Races in two years, Stanley Woods parted with Norton motorcycles over the issue of prize money and race tactics and joined Husqvarna alongside Ernie Nott.

The 1934 Junior TT Race was won by Jimmie Guthrie riding for Norton at an average race speed of 79.16 mph from Jimmie Simpson and Ernie Nott a distant third riding for the Swedish Husqvarna marque.

During the first lap of the 1934 Lightweight Race, Syd Crabtree, the winner of the 1929 Lightweight Race, crashed at the Stonebreakers Hut on the Mountain Section and was killed. The 1934 Lightweight TT Race was won by Jimmie Simpson riding a Rudge motorcycle in 3 hours, 23 minutes and 10 seconds at an average race speed of 70.81 mph. The 1934 Lightweight TT Race provided Rudge with another 1-2-3 win since the 1930 Junior TT Race and Jimmie Simpson's only TT Race victory winning from team-mates Ernie Nott and Graham Walker taking 2nd and 3rd places.

The 1934 Senior TT Race was led by Stanley Woods riding for Husqvarna but retired on the Mountain Section on the last lap after running out of fuel. This handed a Junior/Senior double win to Jimmie Guthrie riding the works Norton at an average speed of 78.01 mph from Jimmie Simpson riding a Norton in his last TT Race and Walter Rusk with a Velocette.

== Senior TT (500cc) ==
7 laps (264.11 miles) Mountain Course.

Rank	Rider	Team	Speed (mph)	Time
1	(Scotland) Jimmie Guthrie	Norton	78.01	3:23.10.0
2	(United Kingdom) Jimmie Simpson	Norton	75.27	3:30.05.0
3	(United Kingdom) Walter Rusk	Velocette	73.27	3:36:19.0
4	(United Kingdom) Les Archer	Velocette	72.58	3:38:22.0
5	(United Kingdom) Vic Brittain	Norton	72.24	3:39.25.0
6	(United Kingdom) Graham Walker	Rudge	70.59	3:44.32.0
7	(Republic of Ireland) Henry Tyrell-Smith	AJS	70.56	3:44.38.0
8	(United Kingdom) Harold Newman	Velocette	69.42	3:48.20.0
9	(United Kingdom) Harold Daniell	AJS	69.02	3:49.02.0
10	(United Kingdom) Alec Mitchell	Velocette	68.68	3:50.46.0

== Junior TT (350cc) ==
7 laps (264.11 miles) Mountain Course.

Rank	Rider	Team	Speed (mph)	Time
1	(Scotland) Jimmie Guthrie	Norton	79.16	3.20.14.0
2	(United Kingdom) Jimmie Simpson	Norton	79.10	3:20.23.0
3	(United Kingdom) Ernie Nott	Husqvarna	76.93	3:26.02.0
4	(United Kingdom) Harold Newman	Velocette	76.84	3:26.16.0
5	(United Kingdom) Alec Mitchell	Velocette	76.55	3:27.03.0
6	(United Kingdom) Les Archer	Velocette	76.05	3:28.24.0
7	(United Kingdom) Walter Rusk	Velocette	75.51	3:29.55.0
8	(Spain) Fernando Aranda	Velocette	72.73	3:27.56.0
9	(United Kingdom) Vic Brittain	Velocette	72.73	3:39.00.0
10	(United Kingdom) Harry Lamacraft	Velocette	71.73	3:42.42.0

== Lightweight TT (250cc) ==
7 laps (264.11 miles) Mountain Course.

Rank	Rider	Team	Speed (mph)	Time
1	(United Kingdom) Jimmie Simpson	Rudge	70.81	3.43.50.0
2	(United Kingdom) Ernie Nott	Rudge	69.79	3:47.07.0
3	(United Kingdom) Graham Walker	Rudge	67.67	3:54.13.0
4	(Republic of Ireland) Stanley Woods	Moto Guzzi	67.54	3:54.41.0
5	(Republic of Ireland) Charlie Manders	New Imperial	66.12	3:59.42.0
6	(United Kingdom) Sid Gleave	Excelsior	65.92	4:00.27.0
7	(United Kingdom) Chris Tattersall	CTS	64.45	4:05.55.0
8	(United Kingdom) Les Martin	Cotton	60.69	4:21.10.0

Only 8 finishers

== Notes ==
- Major alterations to the Snaefell mountain course are carried out for the 1934 TT Races. This includes the removal of the East Mountain sheep-gate.
