= Frederick James Walker =

Irish motorcycle racer

Frederick James 'Frank' Walker (1876 – 19 May 1914) was an Irish motorcycle racer who competed at the Isle of Man TT races.

A hat manufacturer by trade and native of Kingstown, County Dublin, Ireland, Walker competed at the 1914 TT races riding a Royal Enfield motorcycle in the Junior TT race. After leading on the first lap, Walker suffered tyre problems and eventually dropped to sixth place. After regaining third place by lap 5, Walker ran wide into a ditch at Hillberry and was thrown over the handle-bars. After recovering his motorcycle, Walker continued on the last lap but fell at Willaston Corner on Ballanard Road after locking both wheels under braking. Again managing to continue, on the short distance to the finish his view of the finish-line was obscured by spectators who had spilled onto the road to watch the competitors cross the finish-line. Passing the judges-box at the finish-line, Walker continued at full racing speed through St. Ninians Crossroads and collided with a wooden barrier across Ballaquayle Road, was thrown from his motorcycle and taken to hospital where he died of his injuries. Later, Walker was posthumously declared third-place finisher by the ACU race committee in the Junior TT race won by Eric Williams.
