= 1912 Isle of Man TT =

Motorcycle race on the Isle of Man

1912 Isle of Man Tourist Trophy
- Date: June 28, July 1, 1912
- Location: Douglas, Isle of Man
- Course: Snaefell Mountain Course; 37.5 mi (60.39 km)
- Organiser: Auto-Cycle Union
- Clerk: J.R. Nisbet

Junior TT
- First: Harry Bashall, Douglas
- Second: Ed Kickham, Douglas
- Third: Harold Cox, Forward

Fastest lap
- Ed Kickham; 53min. 53sec. 42.00 mph

Senior TT
- First: Frank Applebee jun., Scott
- Second: Jack Haswell, Triumph
- Third: Harry Collier, Matchless

Fastest lap
- Frank Applebee jun. 45min. 31sec. 49.43 mph

The 1912 Isle of Man TT races were again held over the Isle of Man TT Mountain Course. Several manufacturers complained that the new mountain course was too arduous and threatened to boycott the 1912 races.

With an Indian clean sweep the previous year the British manufacturers' pride was dented but even with a smaller entry the Junior race held on Friday, 28 June, in the rain that challenged the belt-driven machines giving the advantage to the chain-driven ones. Two privately entered Douglas motor-cycles of Harry Bashall and Ed Kickham took the first two places in the Junior TT race of 1912.

The Senior TT was held on Monday 1 July 1912. Frank A. Applebee on the two-stroke twin-cylinder Scott carried off the trophy after a hard race. This was the first ever two-stroke Isle of Man TT win. Jack Haswell on single-cylinder Triumph was beaten by 6 minutes 54 seconds. Had not Frank Philipp's tyre come off the rim at Ballaugh on the last lap, Scotts would have finished first and second. Philipp's oval rim dropped him to eleventh place. Hoffman and Adamson placed two more Triumphs among the top six.

== Junior TT final standings ==
Friday 28 June 1912 – 4 laps (150 miles) Isle of Man TT Mountain Course

(Isle of Man) The 6th International Auto-cycle Tourist Trophy

Pos	#	Rider	Bike	Cyl.	Junior TT race classification			
Pos	#	Rider	Bike	Cyl.	Laps	Time	Speed	Prizes & remarks
1	21	(United Kingdom) Harry Bashall	2¾ hp Douglas 350cc	2	4	3:46.59	39.65 mph	1st Prize - Winner of Junior Trophy and £30. 1st Private entry.
2	11	(United Kingdom) Eddie Kickham	2¾ hp Douglas 350cc	2	4	3:51.36	38.86 mph	2nd Prize - £20. 2nd Private entry.
3	9	(United Kingdom) Harold Cox	2¾ hp Forward 344cc	2	4	4:06.29	36.51 mph	3rd Prize - £10.
4	8	(Northern Ireland) James Stewart	2¾ hp Douglas 350cc	2	4	4:29.4	33.45 mph	Gold medal.
5	22	(United Kingdom) Percy Owen	2¾ hp Forward 344cc	2	4	4:31.54	33.10 mph	Gold medal.
6	17	(United Kingdom) Robert Ellis	2¾ hp NUT 344cc	2	4	4:32.26	33.03 mph	Gold medal.
7	4	(United Kingdom) Harold Petty	2 ½ hp Singer 299cc	1	4	4:42.19	31.88 mph	First single-cylinder
8	15	(United Kingdom) Jack Haslam	2¾ hp Douglas 350cc	2	4	5:00.05	29.92 mph	
9	25	(United Kingdom) Vic Pratt	2½ hp O.K. Precision 348cc	1	4	5:15.39	28.51 mph	
10	14	(United Kingdom) Howard Newman	2½ hp Ivy-Precision 348cc	1	4	5:22.27	27.91 mph	
11	1	(United Kingdom) Percy J. Evans	2¾ hp Humber 345cc	2	4	5:43.21	26.21 mph	
DNF	19	(United Kingdom) Dan O'Donovan	2 ½ hp Singer 299cc	1	3	Retired on last lap due inlet valve trouble. Six plugs gave up.		
DNF	21	(United Kingdom) John Bashall	2¾ hp Humber 345cc	2	3	Retired on last lap due lubrication and tire troubles, sooted plugs.		
DNF	24	(United Kingdom) Rex Mundy	2¾ hp Douglas 350cc	2	2	Retired on lap 3 due puncture on mountain road.		
DNF	3	(Australia) Les Bailey	2¾ hp Douglas 350cc	2	1	Retired on lap 2 at Hairpin due to stripped gears.		
DNF	6	(Isle of Man) Douglas Brown	2¾ hp Humber 345cc	2	1	Retired on lap 2. Pulley bearing.		
DNF	5	(United Kingdom) J. Harrison Watson	2¾ hp Humber 345cc	2	0	Retired on first lap at Keppel Gate due to timing gear trouble.		
DNF	18	(United Kingdom) Norman Slatter	2¾ hp Alcyon 299cc	1	0	Retired on first lap at Crosby. Gear trouble.		
DNF	18	(France) M. Stoeffel	2¾ hp Alcyon 299cc	1	0	Retired on first lap due to broken valve.		
DNF	5	(Isle of Man) Walter Creyton	2¾ hp Humber 345cc	2	0	Retired on first lap at Keppel Gate due seized engine.		
DNS	2	(United Kingdom) Hugh Mason	2¾ hp NUT-JAP 349cc	2		Finished practices successfully. Suffered broken frame on a way to the garage.		
DNS	7	(German Empire) Karl Gassert	2½ hp NSU 348.6cc	2		NSU team didn't arrive to the races.		
DNS	10	(United Kingdom) J.H. Kerr	2½ hp NSU 349.2cc	1		NSU team didn't arrive to the races.		
DNS	12	(United Kingdom) H.J. Beal	2½ hp NSU 348.6cc	2		NSU team didn't arrive to the races.		
DNS	16	(United Kingdom) J. Ingram Walker	2½ hp NSU 349.2cc	1		NSU team didn't arrive to the races.		
Fastest lap: Ed Kickham, 53min. 53sec. 41.75 mph

== Senior TT 500cc Race final standings ==
Monday 1 July 1912 – 5 laps (187.50 miles) Isle of Man TT Mountain Course

(Isle of Man) The 6th International Auto-cycle Tourist Trophy

Pos	#	Rider	Bike	Cyl.	Senior TT race classification			
Pos	#	Rider	Bike	Cyl.	Laps	Time	Speed	Prizes & remarks
1	7	(United Kingdom) Frank A. Applebee	3 ½hp Scott 486.6cc	2	5	3:51.03	48.69 mph	1st Prize - Winner of Senior Trophy and £40.
2	1	(United Kingdom) Jack Haswell	3½ hp Triumph 499cc	1	5	3:57.57	47.28 mph	2nd Prize - £20.
3	38	(United Kingdom) Harry Collier	3 ½hp Matchless 497cc	2	5	4:01.56	46.50 mph	3rd Prize - £10.
4	37	(United Kingdom) Charlie Collier	3 ½hp Matchless 497cc	2	5	4:07.37	45.43 mph	Gold medal.
5	11	(United Kingdom) J.A. Hoffmann	3½ hp Triumph 499cc	1	5	4:12.49	44.46 mph	Gold medal.
6	35	(United Kingdom) Jimmy W. Adamson	3½ hp Triumph 499cc	1	5	4:14.02	44.29 mph	Gold medal.
7	21	(United Kingdom) Alister Kirk	3½ hp Triumph 499cc	1	5	4:14.07	44.29 mph	Gold medal.
8	2	(Scotland) Jimmy Alexander, jun.	3½ hp Indian 497cc	2	5	4:17.04	44.20 mph	Gold medal.
9	17	(United Kingdom) Charles Martin	3½ hp Triumph 499cc	1	5	4:17.04	43.77 mph	
10	23	(Scotland) Alfie Alexander	3½ hp Indian 497cc	2	5	4:21.01	43.10 mph	
11	9	(United Kingdom) Frank Philipp	3 ½hp Scott 486.6cc	2	5	4:25.34	42.45 mph	
12	3	(United Kingdom) Billy Heaton	3 ½hp DOT 498cc	2	5	4:28.26	41.97 mph	
13	39	(United Kingdom) Jack Sirett	3½ hp Indian 497cc	2	5	4:31.32	41.82 mph	
14	44	(United Kingdom) Harry Reed	3½hp DOT 498cc	2	5	4:31.32	41.51 mph	
15	43	(Australia) Les Bailey	2¾hp Douglas 354cc	2	5	4:35.30	40.90 mph	
16	42	(United Kingdom) Percy Butler	3½ hp Triumph 499cc	1	5	4:36.09	40.76 mph	
17	48	(United Kingdom) Eddie Kickham	2¾hp Douglas 354cc	2	5	4:39.41	40.33 mph	
18	13	(United Kingdom) Sidney Garrett	3½ hp Regal Green 499cc	1	5	4:49.13	38.96 mph	
19	10	(United Kingdom) Thomas Blumfield, jun.	4 hp Blumfield 495.6cc	1	5	5:34.57	35.73 mph	
DQ	6	(United Kingdom) Ivan Hart-Davies	3½ hp Triumph 499cc	1	5	5:11.34	36.17 mph	Finished 19th. Disqualified for taking petrol outside of depot.
Fastest lap: Frank Applebee, 45min. 31sec. 49.43 mph
