= AJS Silver Streak =

British motorcycle launched in 1938

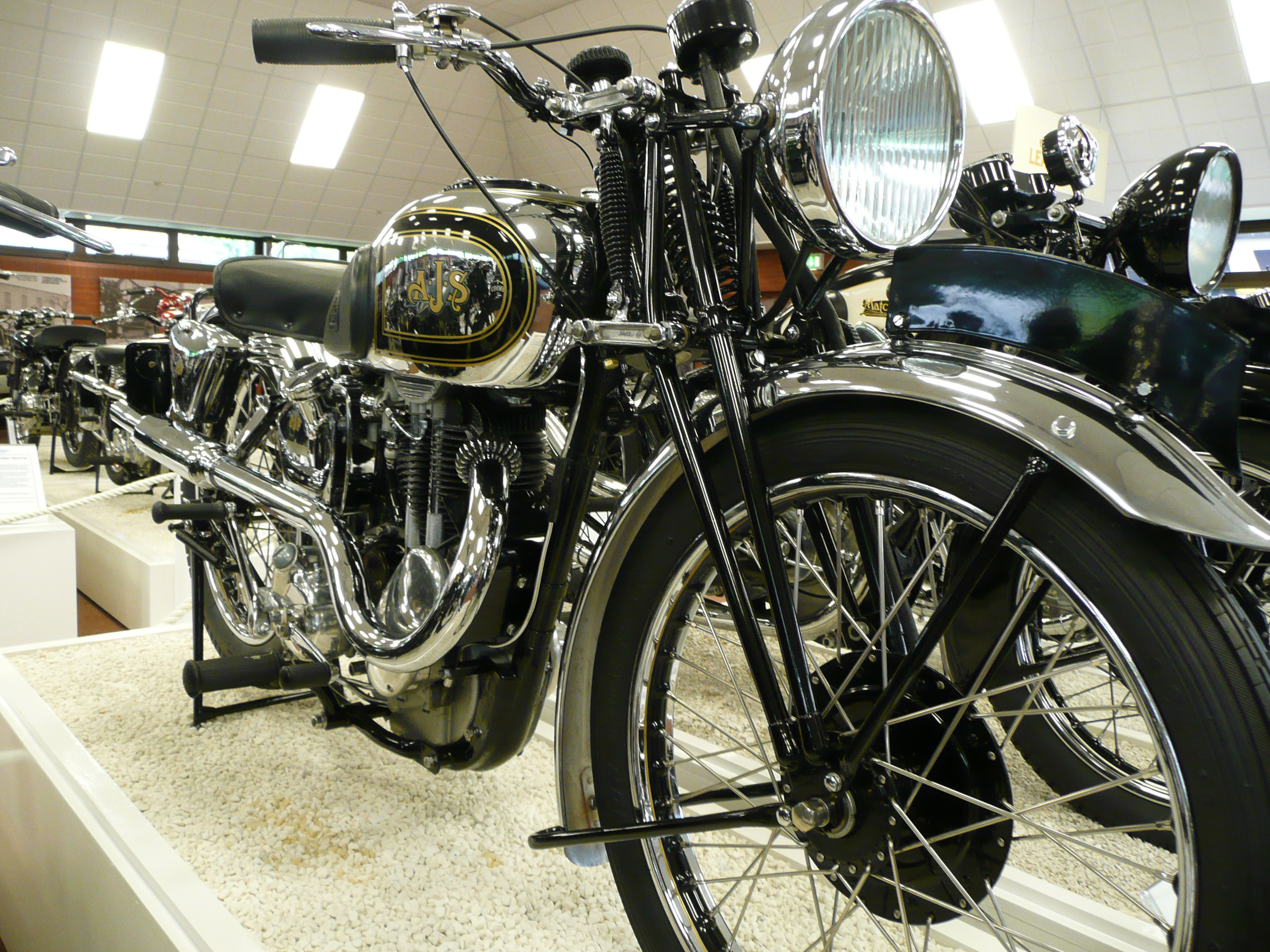
- 1938 AJS Silver Streak
- Manufacturer: AJS
- Parent company: Matchless
- Production: 1938
- Class: Motorcycle
- Engine: 250 cc, 350 cc, 500 cc single-cylinder OHV
- Transmission: Four speed Burman heavyweight gearbox
- Weight: 330 lb (150 kg) (dry)
- Fuel capacity: 2.5 imp gal (11 L)

The AJS Silver Streak was a British motorcycle launched in 1938 and described in the sales brochure as the 'aristocrats of the motor-cycle world'. Produced with a choice of 250 cc, 350 cc and 500 cc engines, the Silver Streaks were super sport machines with a special polished finish and hand tuned engines. As many parts as possible were specially chrome plated, including the mudguards, headlamp, fork links, front and rear chain cases, oil and petrol tanks and even the tool-box.

The Silver Streak had high ground clearance and a substantial crankcase shield which made it a good competition motorcycle. A low bottom gear made it useful for cross country and close ratios made it a fast road bike.
