= Tom Sheard =

British motorcycle racer (1889–1954)

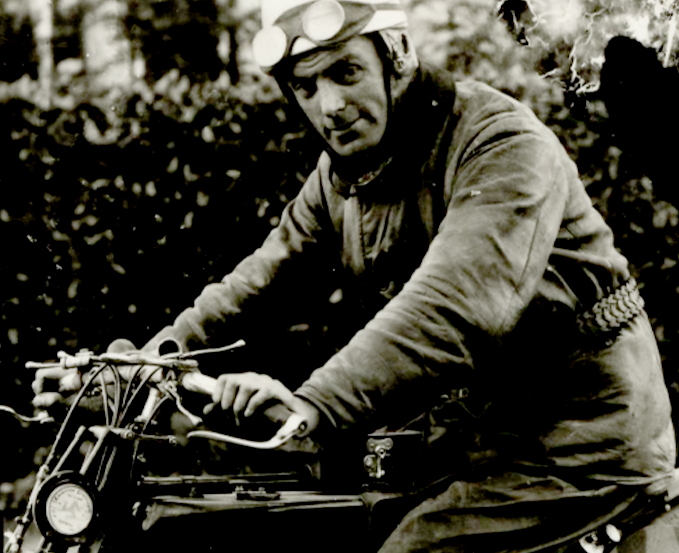
Tom Sheard in 1921

Thomas Mylchreest Sheard Jnr (6 January 1889 in Dalby, Isle of Man, – 10 August 1954), a motorcycle racer with two victories at the Isle of Man TT races, was a great nephew to Joseph Mylchreest, the 'Diamond King'.

The 1922 Junior TT race was won by local competitor Sheard riding an AJS motorcycle at an average race speed of 54.75 mph. Hutchison Tyres were used on AJS machines in 1922, and Sheard featured in their adverts of the time. An example of this was in "The Scotsman" newspaper after the TT win in 1922.

In 1923, Douglas had their first Senior TT race victory with Sheard winning on a 500 cc machine. Sheard was one of only five riders in the world to trial disc brakes on a Douglas motorcycle. Other riders to trial the disc-braked Douglas were Freddie Dixon and Sydney Ollerhead. As of 2023, Sheard remains the only Manxman to win the Senior TT.

Douglas was a British motorcycle manufacturer from 1907 to 1957 based in Kingswood, Bristol, owned by the Douglas family, and especially known for its horizontally opposed twin cylinder engined bikes and as manufacturers of speedway machines.
