= 1921 Isle of Man TT =

Annual motorcycle racing event

1921 Isle of Man Tourist Trophy
- Date: 14 and 16 June 1921
- Location: Douglas, Isle of Man
- Course: Snaefell Mountain Course; 37.75 miles (60.75 km)
- Organiser: Auto-Cycle Union
- Clerk: T.W. Loughborough

Junior TT
- First: Eric Williams, AJS
- Second: Howard R Davies, AJS
- Third: Tom Sheard, AJS

Fastest lap
- Howard Davies; 41min. 4sec. 55.15 mph New record

Lightweight class
- First: Doug Prentice, New Imperial-JAP
- Second: Geoff Davison, Levis
- Third: W.G. Harrison, Velocette

Senior TT
- First: Howard R Davies, AJS 349cc
- Second: Freddie Dixon, Indian
- Third: Bert le Vack, Indian

Fastest lap
- Freddie Edmond; 40min. 8sec. 56.40 mph New record

The 1921 Isle of Man Tourist Trophy Junior 350 cc race took place on Tuesday 14 June and the Senior 500 cc was on Thursday 16 June.

In this year AJS redeemed themselves by completing a hat trick, taking the first four places for a total of six of the top ten places in the Junior 350 cc race. Works teams boosted the entries to 133 riders and machines and amongst the thousands of spectators was Stanley Woods, making his first visit to the island as a young man, who would later return to make TT history by winning 10 times.

The Junior race speeds also rose considerably over the previous year with a lap speed of more than 50 mph (80 km/h). It had been suggested that sidecar racing could start in 1921 but this idea was not well received and not implemented until 1923. It was announced there was a possibility of moving the TT races to Belgium for 1922 but the Auto-Cycle Union never made the switch.

Despite AJS motorcycles filling the first five places of the Junior race, it was punctures that decided the race outcome. The eventual winner of the 1921 Junior TT Race was Eric Williams riding an AJS in 3 hours, 37 minutes and 23 seconds, an average race speed of 52.10 mph (83.85 km/h). The race was initially led by Howard R Davies also riding for AJS who set a new lap record for the Junior race of 41 minutes and 4 seconds, an average speed of 55.15 mph (88.76 km/h). Time lost by Howard Davies mending a puncture at Windy Corner gave the lead to Jim Whalley riding a Massey-Arran motorcycle. On the last lap Whalley also punctured at Windy Corner and finished the Junior race in fifth place. New Imperial made sales-boosting news with a win in the Lightweight 250 cc class by rider Doug Prentice, coming tenth overall in the 350 cc Junior race.

More drama was to follow in the Senior event as the race-lead changed every lap between Alec Bennett riding a Sunbeam, Freddie W.Dixon riding an Indian, and Freddie Edmond riding a Triumph who set a new lap record of 40 minutes and 8 seconds, an average speed of 56.40 mph (90.77 km/h). The Senior race was eventually won by Howard Davies riding a 350 cc Junior race motorcycle, by a margin of 2 minutes and 3 seconds from Freddie Dixon and Bert Le Vack in 4 hours, 9 minutes and 22 seconds, at an average race speed of 54.49 mph (87.69 km/h).

== Race results ==
=== Junior TT 350cc ===
Held on Tuesday, 14 June, at 9:30 am over a distance of 188.75 miles (5 laps of 37.75 miles each), limited to machines of cylinder capacity not exceeding 350cc., with a class for 250 cc. engines run concurrently for The Motor Cycle cup. All 65 entries started the race (43 in 350cc class, 22 in 250cc class), comprising 33 four-stroke singles, 22 two-stroke singles, 7 Flat Twins and 3 V Twin, thirty-eight finished (25 in 350cc class, 13 in 250cc class).

The 10th International Isle of Man Tourist Trophy

Pos	#	Rider	Bike	Cyl.	Junior TT and Lightweight class race classification			
Pos	#	Rider	Bike	Cyl.	Laps	Time	Speed	Prizes & Remarks
1	52	(United Kingdom) Eric Williams	2¾ hp AJS 349cc	1	5	3.37.23	52.21 mph	1st Prize - Winner of Junior Tourist Trophy, £40 and gold medal.
2	59	(United Kingdom) Howard R Davies	2¾ hp AJS 349cc	1	5	3.41.10	51.15 mph	2nd Prize - £20 and gold medal.
3	59	(Isle of Man) Tom Sheard	2¾ hp AJS 349cc	1	5	3.49.09	49.45 mph	3rd Prize - £10 and gold medal.
4	32	(Scotland) George Kelly	2¾ hp AJS 349cc	1	5	3.49.22	49.40 mph	Gold medal.
5	23	(United Kingdom) Jim Whalley	2¾ hp Massey-Arran 348cc	1	5	3.52.39	48.70 mph	Gold medal.
6	57	(United Kingdom) Ossie Wade	2¾ hp AJS 349cc	1	5	3.59.02	47.40 mph	Gold medal.
7	48	(United Kingdom) W. Howarth	2¾ hp DOT 346cc	1	5	4.05.14	46.25 mph	Gold medal.
8	38	(United Kingdom) Harry Harris	2¾ hp AJS 349cc	1	5	4.10.09	45.30 mph	
9	39	(United Kingdom) R. Carey	2¾ hp Blackburne 348cc	1	5	4.12.14	44.90 mph	
10	24	(United Kingdom) Doug Prentice	2¼ hp New Imperial (249 cc JAP)	1	5	4.12.37	44.80 mph	1st in Lightweight class - Winner of The Motor Cycle Trophy and a gold medal.
Fastest lap: Howard Davies, 41min. 4sec. 55.15 mph (New record)

=== Senior TT ===
Held on Thursday, 16 June, at 9:30 am over a distance of 226.50 miles (6 laps of 37.75 miles each), limited to machines of cylinder capacity not exceeding 500cc. Out of 68 entries, comprising 52 four-stroke singles, 9 four-stroke twins, 6 two-stroke twins and 1 two-stroke single, sixty-four started the race and twenty-four finished.

The 10th International Isle of Man Tourist Trophy

Pos	#	Rider	Bike	Cyl.	Senior TT race classification			
Pos	#	Rider	Bike	Cyl.	Laps	Time	Speed	Prizes & Remarks
1	2	(United Kingdom) Howard R. Davies	2¾ hp AJS 349cc	1	6	4.09.22	54.49 mph	1st Prize - Winner of Senior Tourist Trophy, £50 and gold medal.
2	65	(United Kingdom) Freddie Dixon	3½ hp Indian 498.8cc	1	6	4.11.35	54.02 mph	2nd Prize - £25 and gold medal.
3	32	(United Kingdom) Bert le Vack	3½ hp Indian 498.8cc	1	6	4.12.06	53.91 mph	3rd Prize - £15 and gold medal.
4	9	(Canada) Alec Bennett	3½ hp Sunbeam 499cc	1	6	4.14.11	53.47 mph	Gold medal.
5	60	(United Kingdom) Jack Watson-Bourne	3½ hp Triumph 498.78cc	1	6	4.18.55	52.49 mph	Gold medal.
6	62	(United Kingdom) Leslie Mitchell	3½ hp Norton 490cc	1	6	4.24.04	51.46 mph	Gold medal.
7	48	(United Kingdom) Freddie Edmond	3½ hp Triumph 498.78cc	1	6	4.24.06	51.46 mph	Gold medal.
8	67	(United Kingdom) George Dance	3½ hp Sunbeam 499cc	1	6	4.24.25		Gold medal. Rode last 4 laps on top gear with a broken gearbox
9	61	(Isle of Man) Tom Sheard	3½ hp Sunbeam 499cc	1	6	4.26.42		Gold medal.
10	14	(United Kingdom) Frank Townshend	3½ hp Triumph 498.78cc	1	6	4.27.51		Gold medal.
11	34	(Scotland) Douggie Alexander	3½ hp Norton 490cc	1	6	4.29.30		Gold medal.
12	44	(United Kingdom) Billie Hollowell	3½ hp Norton 490cc	1	6	4.30.18		Gold medal. 1st Private entry.
13	52	(United Kingdom) Walter Brandish, Junr.	3½ hp Rover 499cc	1	6	4.30.36		Gold medal.
14	59	(United Kingdom) Harry Harris	2¾ hp AJS 349cc	1	6	4.30.53		Gold medal.
15	51	(United Kingdom) Noel Brown	3½ hp Indian 498.8cc	1	6	4.34.00		Gold medal.
16	29	(United Kingdom) George Shemans	3½ hp Triumph 498.78cc	1	6	4.34.14		Gold medal.
17	28	(United Kingdom) R.W. Stanfield	3½ hp Scott 486cc	2	6	4.39.04		1st Twin-cylinder.
18	54	(United Kingdom) Ray Braid	3½ hp Triumph 498.78cc	1	6	4.43.44		
19	27	(United Kingdom) M.H. Edmunds	3½ hp Triumph 498.78cc	1	6	4.50.15		
20	45	(United Kingdom) Norman Black	3½ hp Douglas 494cc	2	6	4.52.21		
21	21	(United Kingdom) George Strange	3½ hp James 496cc	2	6	5.00.20		
22	15	(United Kingdom) J.W. Moffat	3½ hp Scott 486cc	2	6	5.04.41		
23	17	(United Kingdom) Vivian Olsson	3½ hp Sunbeam 499cc	1	6	5.21.33		
24	6	(United Kingdom) Albert Milner	3½ hp Sunbeam 499cc	1	6	5.27.08		
Fastest lap: Freddie Edmond, 40min. 8sec. 56.40 mph (New record)
