= 1931 Isle of Man TT =

Annual motorcycle racing event

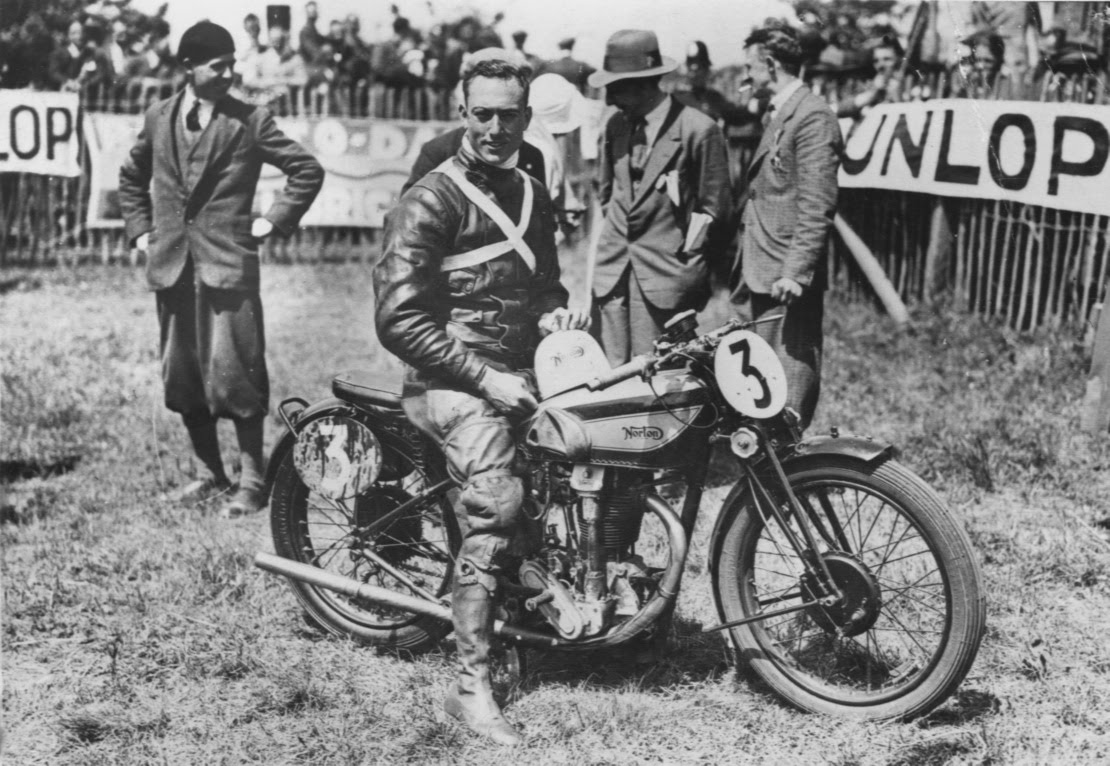
Senior TT and Junior TT winner Tim Hunt (pictured on his Junior TT bike)

The 1931 Isle of Man Tourist Trophy was again dominated by the battle between Rudge, Sunbeam and Norton motorcycles.

The 1931 Junior TT Race was run at a very fast pace by Jimmie Simpson riding for Norton who completed the first lap in 30 minutes and 49 seconds and was 6 seconds ahead of fellow Norton teammate Stanley Woods in 2nd place and 18 seconds ahead of Freddie Hicks in 3rd place riding an AJS motor-cycle. Although Jimmie Simpson was able to hold on to the lead for the next 5 laps, he was slowed by having to refuel every two laps because of carburetor problems. Fellow Norton teammate Tim Hunt recovered from a slow first lap with a loose plug-lead to set the fastest lap on lap 4 of 30 minutes and 5 seconds an average race speed of 75.27 mph (121.14 km/h) and steadily moved up the leaderboard. Further, carburetor problems caused Jimmie Simpson to drop off the leaderboard; he eventually finished in 8th place. This allowed the 1931 Junior TT Race to be won by Tim Hunt riding for Norton, in 3 hours 34 minutes and 21 seconds, at an average race speed of 73.94 mph (118.99 km/h), from Norton teammates Jimmie Guthrie and Ernie Nott riding a Rudge motor-cycle.

The 1931 Lightweight TT was dominated by the works Rudge motorcycles and the race was lap 1 by Ernie Nott by 45 seconds from Rudge teammates H. G. Tyrell Smith and Graham Walker in 3rd place. By lap 6, Ernie Nott had a lead of 4 minutes over the rest of the field, until on the last lap he slid off just below the Mountain Mile and finished in 4th place steadying a damaged push-rod with his hand. This provided a first and only TT Race win for Graham Walker riding a Rudge at an average race speed of 68.98 mph (111.01 km/h).

The highly anticipated 1931 Senior TT Race which was again set to be dominated by Rudge and Norton motorcycles. However, it proved to be dominated again by Norton and Jimmie Simpson and Jimmie Guthrie. This time Guthrie led on lap 1 by 1 second from Jimmie Simpson and Norton teammate Stanley Woods by 17 seconds in 3rd place. On lap 3, the 1931 Senior TT Race produced the first 80 mph (130 km/h) lap by Jimmie Simpson on a Norton motor-cycle in 28 minutes and 1 seconds an average speed of 80.82 mph (130.07 km/h). Despite taking over the lead from Guthrie, Jimmie Simpson crashed on lap 4 at Ballaugh Bridge and the bike, ending up in the river. Despite re-taking the lead, Jimmie Guthrie slipped off at the Governor's Bridge on lap 5, but continued to finish in 2nd place at an average speed of 77.34 mph (124.47 km/h). Fellow Norton teammate Stanley Woods finished in 3rd place with a glove in the petrol-tank filler. The fast-paced and incident-packed 1931 Senior TT Race provided Tim Hunt with a popular Junior/Senior double win in 3 hours, 23 minutes and 28 seconds for the 7 lap (264.11 mile) race at an average race speed of 77.90 mph (125.37 km/h). The winner of the 1929 Junior Race, Freddie Hicks, crashed on lap 5 at Union Mills and was killed.

== Senior TT (500cc) ==
Rank	Rider	Team	Speed	Time
1	(United Kingdom) Tim Hunt	Norton	77.9 mph (125.4 km/h)	3.23.28.0
2	(Scotland) Jimmie Guthrie	Norton	77.34	3.24.57.0
3	(Republic of Ireland) Stanley Woods	Norton	76.35	3.27.36.0
4	(United Kingdom) Ernie Nott	Rudge	76.32	3.27.41.0
5	(United Kingdom) Graham Walker	Rudge	73.08	3.24.14.0
6	(United Kingdom) Ted Mellors	NSU	73.18	3.36.36.0
7	(United Kingdom) Arthur Tyler	Raleigh	72.61	3.38.18.0
8	(Australia) Arthur Simcock	OK-Supreme	72.48	3.38.40.0
9	(South Africa) Jimmy G Lind	Velocette	71.64	3.41.14.0
10	(United Kingdom) Sid Gleave	SGS	71.16	3.42.45.0

== Junior TT (350cc) ==
Rank	Rider	Team	Speed	Time
1	(United Kingdom) Tim Hunt	Norton	73.94 mph (118.99 km/h)	3.34.21.0
2	(Scotland) Jimmie Guthrie	Norton	72.90	3:37.26.0
3	(United Kingdom) Ernie Nott	Rudge	72.37	3:39.01.0
4	(Republic of Ireland) Stanley Woods	Norton	71.39	3:42.01.0
5	(United Kingdom) Graham Walker	Rudge	70.98	3:43.19.0
6	(United Kingdom) Charlie Dodson	Excelsior	69.58	3:47.47.0
7	(United Kingdom) Alec Mitchell	Velocette	69.46	3:48.11.0
8	(United Kingdom) Jimmie Simpson	Norton	69.06	3:49.30.0
9	(United Kingdom) George Rowley	AJS	69.05	3:49.32.0
10	(United Kingdom) Ted Mellors	New Imperial	69.02	3:49.38.0

== Lightweight TT (250cc) ==
Rank	Rider	Team	Speed	Time
1	(United Kingdom) Graham Walker	Rudge	68.98 mph (111.01 km/h)	3.49.47.0
2	(Republic of Ireland) Henry Tyrell-Smith	Rudge	68.26	3.52.13.0
3	(United Kingdom) Ted Mellors	New Imperial	66.84	3.57.08.0
4	(United Kingdom) Ernie Nott	Rudge	66.72	3.57.34.0
5	(United Kingdom) Frank A Longman	OK-Supreme	65.99	4.00.11.0
6	(Italy) Mario Ghersi	New Imperial	65.62	4.01.33.0
7	(United Kingdom) Stuart Williams	New Imperial	65.49	4.02.01.0
8	(Republic of Ireland) Paddy Johnston	Moto Guzzi	64.6	4.05.24.0
9	(United Kingdom) C. E. Needham	OK-Supreme	63.32	4.10.19.0
10	(United Kingdom) Colin Taylor	OK-Supreme	63.27	4.10.39.0

== Notes ==
- At Sulby during practice, Jack Williams riding a Raleigh motorcycle was timed at 100 mph (160 km/h) and Percy Hunt riding for Norton was timed at 101 mph (163 km/h).
- During practice, Wal Handley slipped off his F.N. motorcycle at the Gooseneck.
- During the 1931 Junior TT Race, H. G. Tyrell Smith riding for Rudge retired on lap 3 running out of petrol. At Ballacraine, Otto Steinfeller retired with gearbox failure. On lap 5, Ted Mellors riding a New Imperial motorcycle and F.A. Renier both crashed at Glen Helen. Both continued; Ted Mellors finished in 10th place and Renier in 16th place.
- On the first lap of the 1931 Senior TT Race, Wal Handley riding for the Belgium motorcycle firm of F.N. slipped off at the Quarterbride and retired. At Keppel Gate on lap 3 of the 1931 Senior TT Race, R.F. Parkinson riding a NSU motorcycle hit a bank and three spectators were slightly injured.
