= 1914 Isle of Man TT =

Annual motorcycle racing event

Isle of Man Tourist Trophy
- Date: May 19 and 21, 1914
- Location: Douglas, Isle of Man
- Course: Snaefell Mountain Course; 37.5 mi (60.39 km)
- Organiser: Auto-Cycle Union
- Clerk

Junior TT
- First: Eric Williams, AJS
- Second: Cyril Williams, AJS
- Third: Frank Walker, Royal Enfield

Fastest lap
- Eric Williams; 47min. 18sec. 47.57 mph New record

Senior TT
- First: Cyril Pullin, Rudge
- Second: Howard R. Davies, Sunbeam
- Third: Oliver Godfrey, Indian

Fastest lap
- Tim Wood; 42min. 16sec. 53.50 mph New record

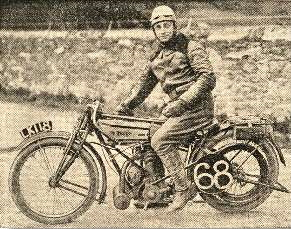
Senior TT winner Cyril Pullin on his Rudge, in a promotional shot for The Motor Cycle

The 1914 Isle of Man Tourist Trophy was the last held before the outbreak of the First World War.

Bad weather overshadowed the Junior race on Tuesday, 19 May, but Eric and Cyril Williams gained first and second place for AJS having passed Irish newcomer Frank Walker who had been leading on the second lap but for an unfortunate accident. Walker remounted his Royal Enfield, chased after the two men with determination but was parted from his machine twice more and still managed to flash over the finish line into third place while the two William's were still congratulating each other, but he failed to turn onto Bray Hill for the machine examination, crashed again on a barrier and succumbed to his injuries four days later.

Thursday, 21 May, was the Senior race day and after more than four hours only 6 m. 24 secs, separated the first three riders and there was the first dead heat in the history of the TT for 2nd place between Howard R Davies and Oliver Godfrey, the winner of the 1911 TT again riding an Indian.

== Junior 350 cc race ==
Pos	Rider	Machine	Speed	Laps
1	Eric Williams	AJS	45.58 mph	5
2	Cyril Williams	AJS		5
3	Frederick James Walker	Royal Enfield		5

== Senior 500 cc race ==
Pos	Rider	Machine	Speed	Laps
1	Cyril Pullin	Rudge	49.49 mph	6
2	Howard R Davies	Sunbeam		6
2	Oliver Godfrey	Indian		6
