= Eric Williams (motorcyclist) =

British motorcyclist

Eric Willams DCM
- Born: 1893; Holmer, Hereford
- Died: 1963 (aged 69–70)
- Occupations: Motorcycle racer and test driver
- Spouse: Margaret Lewis

Eric Williams DCM FIMI (1893-1963) was a British pioneer of motor cycle racing, motor vehicles and automated agricultural harvesting equipment. He was a two-time winner of the Isle of Man Junior TT race in 1914 and 1921 and also gave distinguished military service in First World War as a despatch rider, receiving the Distinguished Conduct Medal (DCM) for bravery. In the Second World War, he served as an advisor in Ministry of Agriculture working on mechanical production in Worcestershire. He raced professionally for AJS, NUT and Sunbeam. After his racing career, he established a motor trade business, Eric Williams Ltd, in Worcester which operated between 1920 and 1960. He had a lifelong passion for racing activities, which he passed to his younger son, Henry ‘Don’ Williams, who also raced cars and motorcycles competitively.

== Sporting career ==
After joining the fledgling AJS motorcycle company in 1914, Williams was soon appointed as head tester, tuner, and factory driver as a result of his motoring proficiency. He achieved early successes in his career, winning the Isle of Man TT at his first attempt in 1914 in the Junior category aged 20 setting a then record lap time of 47:18 (47.5 mph). This was the last Isle of Man TT before the outbreak of the First World War, which interrupted competitive racing between 1914 and 1918.

The cessation of hostilities saw a renewal in domestic and international racing, with Williams returning to the racing scene as a freelance rider, although predominantly racing on AJS and Sunbeam motorcycles. Williams was still recovering from wounds sustained in the war when he participated in both the junior and senior 1920 TT races, however mechanical failures led to his withdrawal from both whilst mid-race, despite being in a leading position in the Junior TT, again setting a new lap record of 44:06 (51.3 mph).

The following year, in what was his third season of competitive racing, Williams was again successful in the TT, where he won the 1921 Junior TT on an AJS machine with an average speed of 52.21 mph. Upon winning, he became the first two-time winner of the junior competition. Due to his intermittent rheumatic condition resulting from his wartime actions Williams did not pass the medical to drive the senior race that year. This was to be Williams’ last entrance in the TT, as he focused more on his family and business interests; however he continued his commitment to riding in other time trial and hill climb competitions

To this end, Williams participated successfully in several British and international competitions, including the 1919 London-Edinburgh time trial where he won a gold medal, victory in the 1920 Colmore Cup, and receiving an individual gold medal for riding without loss of marks as part of the British team in the 1921 International Six Days Trials held in Geneva, Switzerland. He was also awarded a prize for “best performance by a foreign visitor” at this event; an accolade which he was awarded again the subsequent year. He was also the recipient of number of medals as a result of competitive trials organised by his club, the Worcester & District MCC.

== Personal life ==
Eric Williams was born at Holmer, Hereford in May 1893, the seventh child of James and Mary Williams who were farmers and hop growers and adopters of steam threshing equipment. His skills as mechanical apprentice at the Commercial Autocar Company (1908-1911) were spotted and he was asked to become one of the first employees of the then nascent A J Stevens & Co., Wolverhampton where he became head of testing and competition driving. After the outbreak of war in 1914 Williams joined the Royal Engineers and was sent to France as part of the Expeditionary Force serving as a despatch rider, where he was awarded the Distinguished Conduct Medal (DCM) for acts of bravery at Neuve Chapelle in 1915. He was gassed on the Somme in 1916 and following a year in hospital he was discharged as invalid in 1917 and recommended to pursue open air life. Williams joined the Food Production Department and was responsible for importing thousands of tractors to coordinate a national effort in land ploughing in an effort to make barren farmland fertile and productive in 1917–18. He maintained his connections with his farming birth right and passion for mechanisation of the land. In 1919 he opened a motor business in Worcester selling cycles, motorcycles and three-wheeled cars and cars and in 1920 Eric Williams Ltd was established adopting its branding “for anything on wheels”. Eric also recommenced his racing and competition activities travelling extensively in UK and Europe.

Williams married Margaret Gwendoline Lewis (of The Haven, Dilwyn) in September 1921 and retired from racing but retained participation in international trials. Focusing on business he traded Raleigh, Royal Enfield and Sunbeam makes and expanded Eric Williams Ltd into a second location in Pierpoint Street Worcester for car vehicles. He had two sons Eric (1926-1988) and Henry (“Don”) Williams (1928-2018). With the arrival of the Second World War he served in the Ministry of Agriculture for the Worcester Agricultural Committee (1939–45) and was operating over 250 tractors to cultivate new land for production. His business premises were used as part of the war effort for servicing tractors and catering for servicemen.

Following the war, Williams' business represented Jaguar, Austin, Morris, Standard and Ford and Reliant Motors. His elder son, Eric Williams, followed an agricultural career farming near Leominster. His younger son, Don, followed a motoring career with a five-year apprenticeship with the Standard Motor Company, then serving in the Royal Navy before taking up competitive racing for Norton and car racing with Emerson and Cooper. Don Williams took over the motor business when Eric retired in 1952. Eric Williams was a director of The Fisheries (Flint) Ltd and MacFisheries (1948), Lower Hill Farms Ltd (1949) and Eric Williams Ltd. He was a member of British Automobile Racing Club and a Fellow of the Institute of Motor Industry . He enjoyed creative writing and journaled his life delivering new cars from the production line to different places across Europe and Africa and the people he met. He also wrote about agricultural technology and mechanised systems.

Eric Williams Isle of Man TT Results
Competition	Position	Time	Average Speed (mph)
1914 Junior TT	1st	4:06:50	45.58
1920 Junior TT	D.N.F.	N.A.	N.A.
1920 Senior TT	D.N.F	N.A.	N.A.
1921 Junior TT	1st	3:37:23	52.21
1921 Senior TT	D.N.S.	N.A.	N.A.
