= NUT Motorcycles =

- Industry: Manufacturing and engineering
- Founded: 1912
- Defunct: 1933
- Fate: Wound up
- Headquarters: Newcastle Upon Tyne, UK
- Key people: Hugh Mason and Jock Hall
- Products: Motorcycles

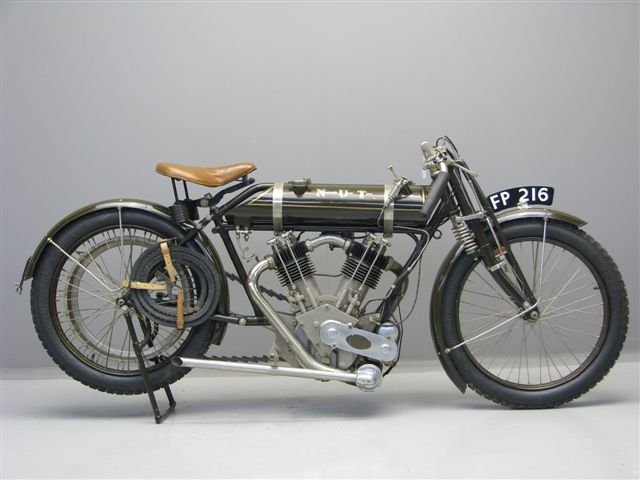
NUT 1000 cc JAP Big Bore racing motorcycle from 1914

NUT Motorcycles was a British motorcycle manufacturer founded in Newcastle Upon Tyne in 1912 by Hugh Mason and Jock Hall, who had previously been making motorcycles since 1906 under a badge based on Mason's initials, HM, and later under the name of Jesmond and Bercley. By 1913 their racing motorcycles were competing successfully in the Isle of Man TT races and Hugh Mason's JAP engined NUT motorcycle won the 1913 Junior TT by just 46 seconds. Originally based on JAP and Villiers engines, NUT began to build their own V-twin sports machines. Following further racing success Mason and Hall moved to larger premises but the company could not survive the First World War and was declared bankrupt. The business was bought by Robert Ellis who restarted in 1921 as Hugh Mason and Company, but it foundered in 1922. Between 1923 and 1933 they continued to make motorcycles under the NUT name but in 1933 the company closed for good.

== Models ==
Model	Year	Notes
NUT 1000cc	1914	V Twin
NUT 500cc	1914	JAP-engined V Twin
NUT 998cc	1922	V-Twin
NUT 700cc	1923	V Twin
NUT 700cc	1925	V-Twin
172cc single		Villiers two-stroke
NUT 750cc		V-twin
350cc Blackburne		
NUT 698cc	1929	JAP-0 engine
