= Freddie Dixon =

English motorcycle racer and racing car driver

- Dixon at the controls of his 1923 TT-winning 'flat-tank' Douglas banking sidecar outfit with front disc brake
- Nationality: British
- Born: 21 April 1892
- Died: 4 November 1956 (aged 64)
Motorcycle racing career statistics
Isle of Man TT career
TTs contested	10 (1912, 1920-1928)
TT wins	2
First TT win	1923 Sidecar TT
Last TT win	1927 Junior TT
TT podiums	5

Frederick William Dixon (21 April 1892 – 4 November 1956) was an English motorcycle racer and racing car driver. The designer of the motorcycle and banking sidecar system, he was also one of the few motorsport competitors to have been successful on two, three and four wheels. He was twice awarded the BRDC Gold Star for car racing. Dixon, who had the nickname "Flying Freddie", was born at Stockton-on-Tees, County Durham, England, one of eight children of John and Martha Dixon (née Agar).

== Motorbike racing ==
After leaving school at the age of thirteen, Dixon was employed in a cycle shop but soon moved on to work in a local garage. He acquired his first motorcycle in 1909 and within a year was competing in speed and hill climb events. His first Isle of Man TT race was in 1912 on a "Cleveland Precision" motorcycle but the machine was not up to the challenge.

During World War I, Dixon spent four years in the Army Service Corps and finished with the rank of staff sergeant.

After war service, Dixon went into business for himself at Park Garage, Linthorpe Road, Middlesbrough. During this time, he gained many placings in the Isle of Man TT races in various categories throughout 1921, 1923, 1924, 1926 and 1927.

Dixon was quite an expert at motorcycle and sidecar racing, culminating in first place in the 1923 Isle on Man TT with passenger Thomas Walter Denney on a Douglas fitted with his banking sidecar system and three-wheel disc brakes. His design leaned the sidecar following the motorcycle direction around the race circuit bends, and was operated by the passenger moving a large lever attached to the sidecar chassis, as was the sidecar brake.

Dixon's victory in 1927 was on an HRD Machine as a factory rider, becoming the first man to win both a sidecar and solo race at the Isle of Man TT. He retired from motorcycle racing in 1928.

== Motor racing ==
In 1932, Dixon appeared on the car racing scene and quickly became renowned for his independently prepared Riley cars. His achievements in racing cars are as impressive as those on motorcycles. First place in the 1934 BRDC 500-mile handicap race at Brooklands and in the same year he won third place at Le Mans with Cyril Paul in a Riley 12/6 (1.5L) MPH Racing. In 1935, he won the BRDC Empire Trophy at Brooklands and also the RAC Tourist Trophy race at Ards circuit Belfast. In 1936, he won the Brooklands 500 mile race and with Charles Dodson the RAC Tourist Trophy at Ards, for the second time. His record as the only man to lap Brooklands at 130 mph in a car of less than 2 litres was never broken. His achievements earned him the British Racing Drivers Club Gold Star twice, in 1934 and 1935.

In 1948, Dixon was contacted by the Douglas motorcycle company to help in the development of their T35 motorcycle which was one of the first real new British post war designs, he redesigned the top half of the engine and these modifications resulted in the new mark 3 Douglas machine.

== Personal life ==
In January 1926, Dixon married Margaret Thew at St. Barnabas Church, Middlesbrough. They had one daughter, Jean. He died at Reigate, Surrey age 64.
