= AJS =

British automobile and motorcycle manufacturer from 1909 to 1931

A. J. Stevens & Co. Ltd (AJS)
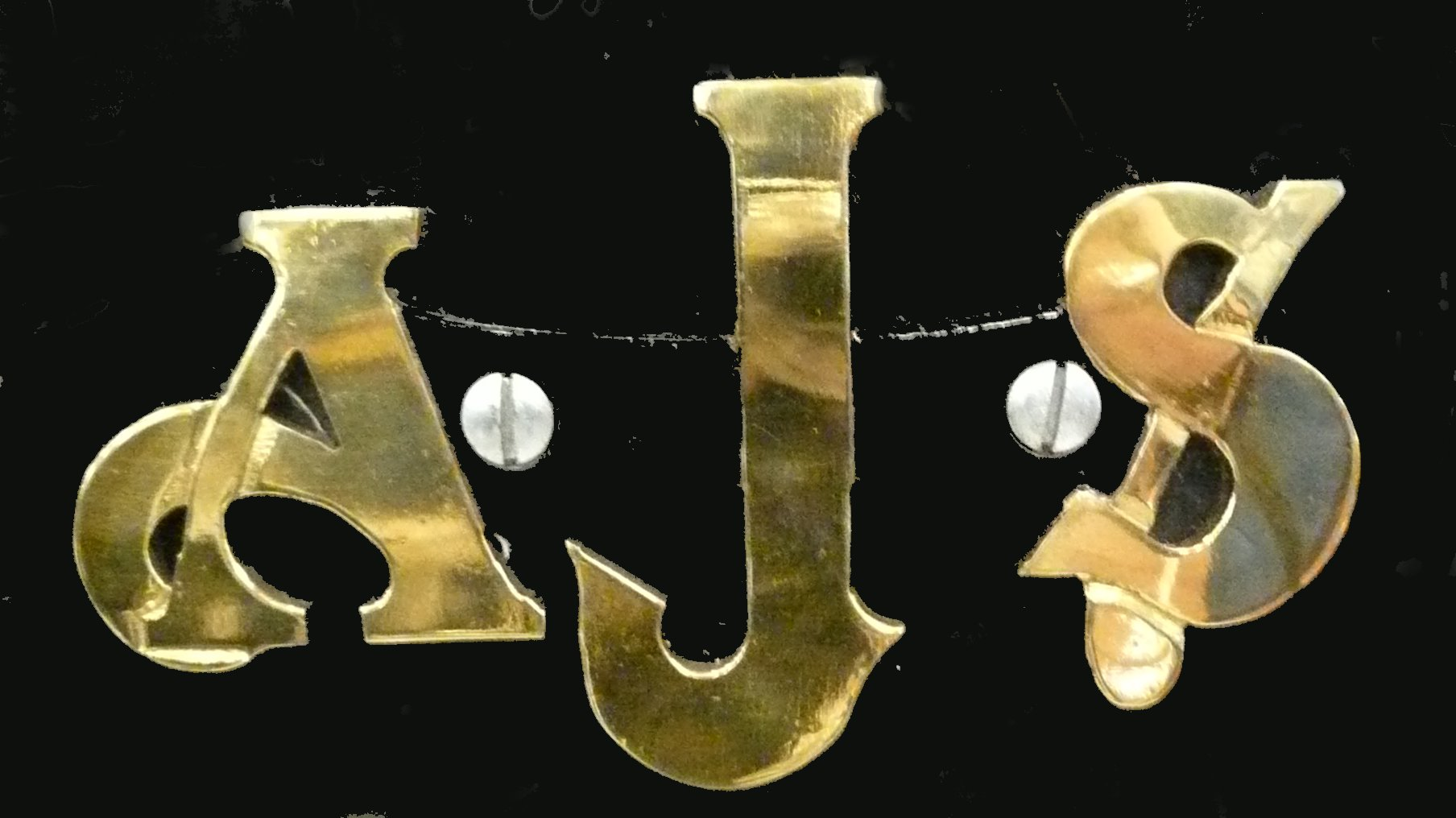
- Founded: 1909
- Founder: A. J. Stevens
- Defunct: 1931
- Fate: Brand name AJS sold numerous times after 1931.
- Successor: Matchless
- Headquarters: Wolverhampton, England, Wolverhampton, England
- Key people: Joe Stevens
- Products: Cars and motorcycles

A. J. Stevens & Co. Ltd better known as AJS is a British motorcycle and automobile manufacturer. Historically it was in operation from 1909 to 1931 and was founded by the Stevens brothers in Wolverhampton, England. In 1931, the firm was sold to Matchless, Associated Motorcycles. In 1966 the company became part of Norton-Villiers. In 2025 a company under the original badge of AJS continues to produce lightweight motorcycles and scooters largely for the British A2 motorcycle market.

The AJS company has a motorcycle racing legacy and held 117 motorcycle world records related to events such as the Isle of Man TT races.

== History ==
=== Motorcycles ===
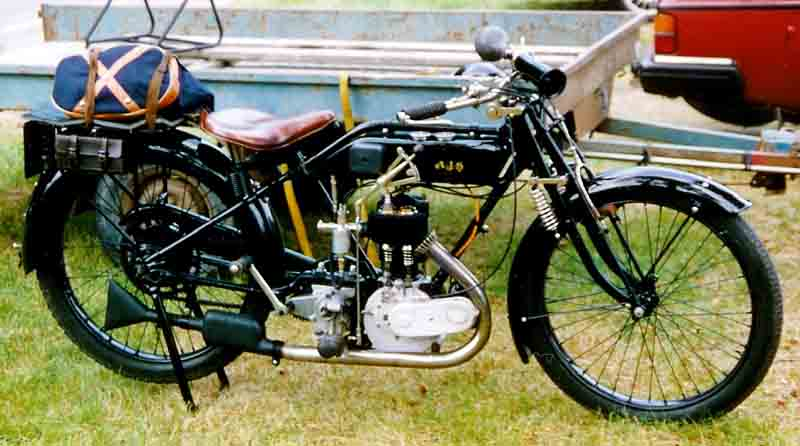
AJS

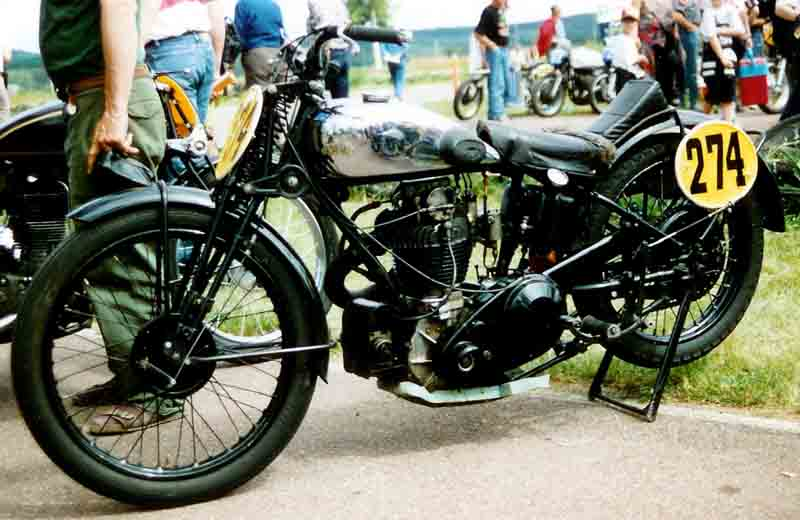
AJS 500 cc OHC Racer 1931

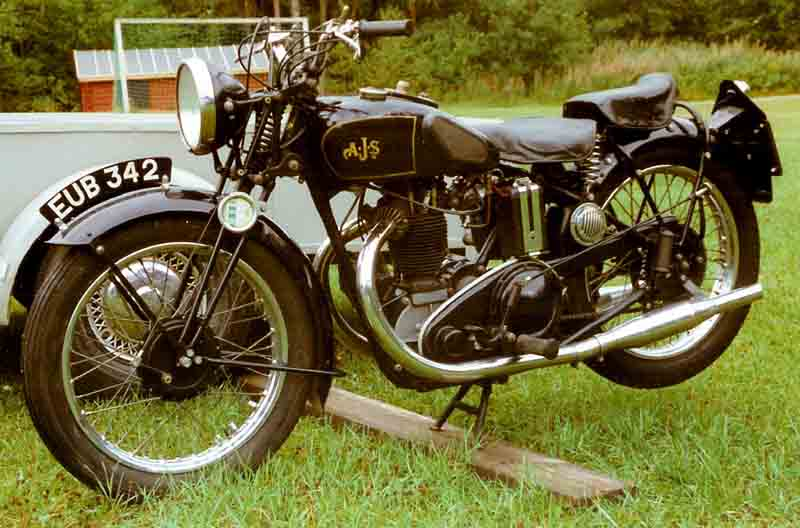
AJS 350 cc TV 1936

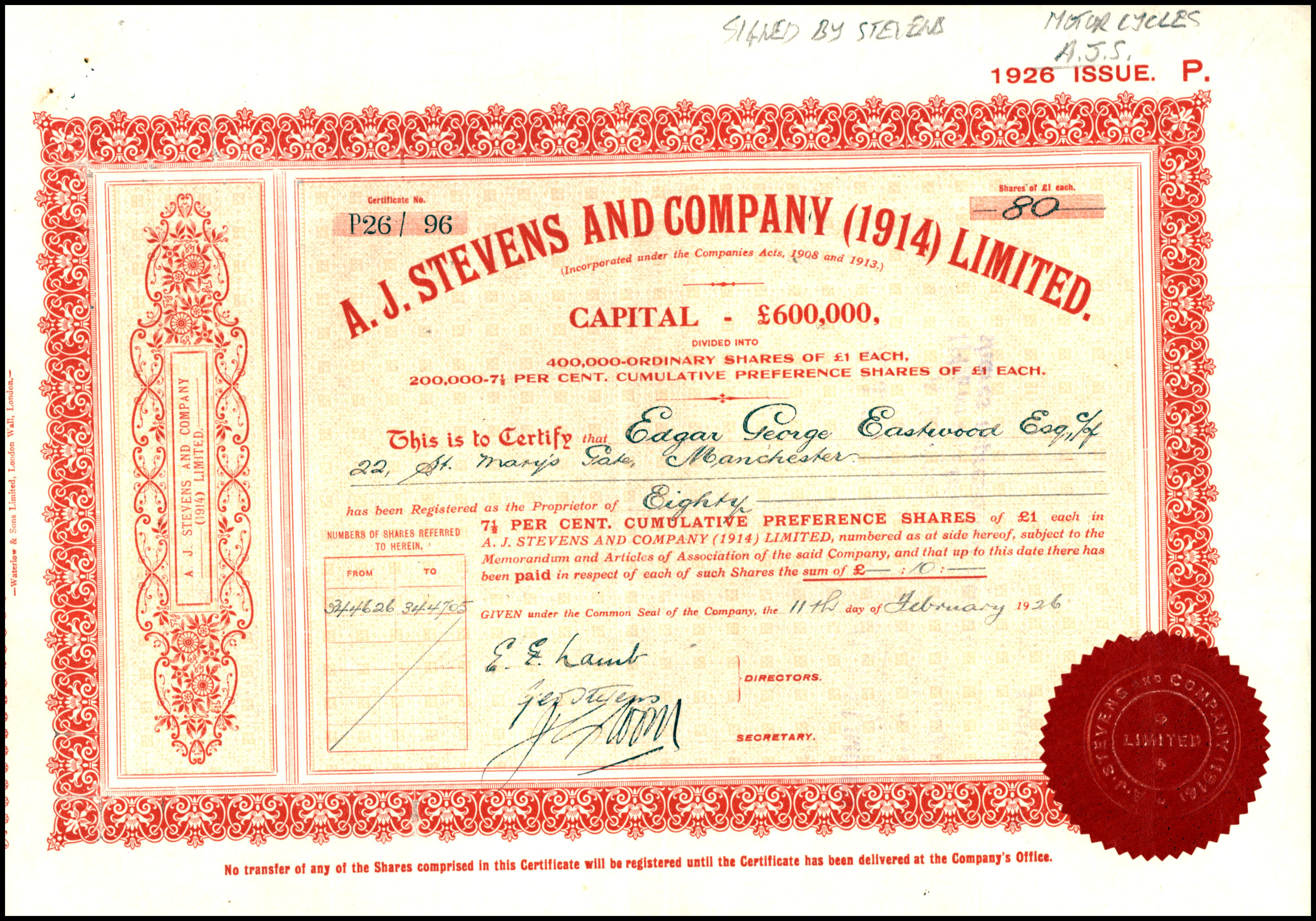
Preference Share of the A. J. Stevens and Company (1914) Ltd., issued 11. February 1926

AJS Silver Streak 1938

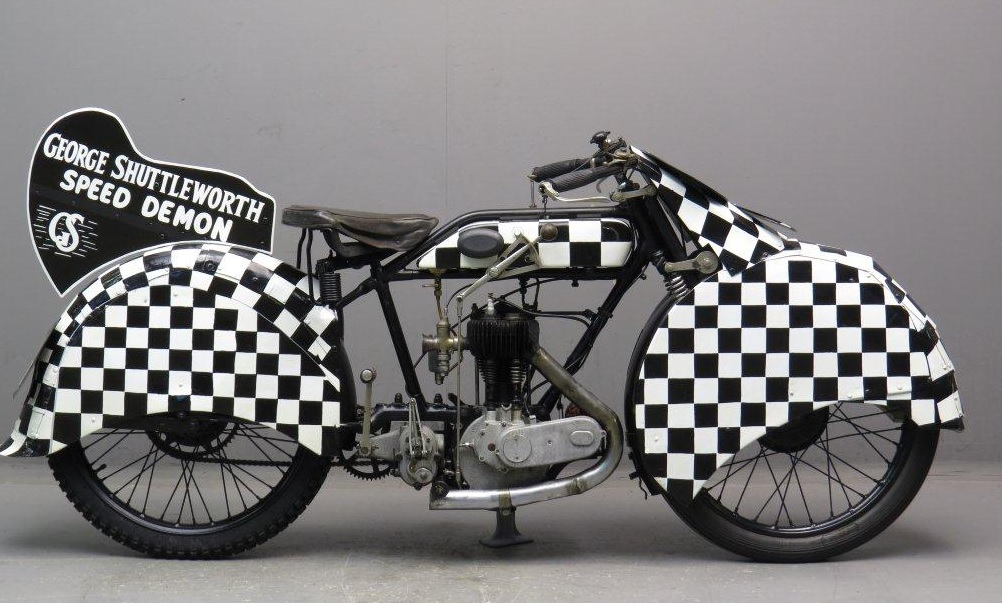
AJS H5 Shuttleworth Snap Replica

Joe Stevens, father of Harry, George, Albert John (‘Jack’), and Joe Stevens Junior, was an engineer who owned the Stevens Screw Company Ltd, in Wednesfield, near Wolverhampton. Stevens had a reputation for high quality engineering before the company built its first motorcycle in 1897, using a Mitchell single-cylinder four-stroke imported from the US. Before long, Stevens began making engines, starting off with a better-built version of the Mitchell but the family soon developed their own designs, including parallel-twins and V-twins, which were sold as proprietary engines to other manufacturers, including Werner, Wolf and Clyno.

In 1909, after a Wearwell motorcycle fitted with a Stevens side-valve single-cylinder engine won a trophy for a 24-hour non-stop run in 1909, Jack Stevens decided to contest the Tourist Trophy in the Isle of Man. A new company, A J Stevens & Co (AJS), was founded, with premises in Retreat Street, Wolverhampton, to manufacture motorcycles and the first model appeared at the Motor Cycle Show in 1910. Its engine, a two-speed 298 cc side-valve, was made to come within the 300 cc limit for Junior machines in the 1911 Isle of Man TT races and was slightly larger than the 292 cc used for the proprietary engines. Jack Stevens came 16th on AJS's official entry, one place behind private owner J.D. Corke on an identical machine.

Albert John Stevens lent his initials to the company, but it was a family concern. In 1922 for example, Harry Stevens acted as managing director, George Stevens as commercial manager, Joe Stevens Junior managing the experimental section and Jack Stevens as production manager.

AJS did not contest the 1912 TT as it was busy satisfying the demand for its products, but was 10th in the 1913 Junior. With the Junior limit raised to 350 cc for 1914, the AJS motorcycle had grown to 349 cc, with four-speed gears and chain final drive. AJS achieved their first TT victory in the Junior 1914 Isle of Man TT race that year through Eric Williams, whilst also taking second, third, fourth and sixth place. The old Screw Company's facilities could not cope with the demand and with the company reconstituted as A.J. Stevens and Company (1914) Ltd, AJS moved to a new factory built around Graiseley House, in the Blakenhall district, a short distance south of the Retreat Street premises, which were relegated to the being the company's office and repair department. The 349 cc machine (known as the 2 3/4 hp) was most in demand but the company also produced an 800 cc (6 hp) V-twin.

On 3 November 1916, the Ministry of Munitions prohibited the production of non-military motorcycles, and AJS went over to manufacturing munitions, but in early 1917 the Ministry received an order from Russia for military vehicles, and AJS was given a contract to produce part of the order with its AJS Model D machine. This kept AJS busy until Ministry of Munitions restrictions were lifted in January 1919.

When production of the 350 resumed in 1920, it was much improved. The side-valve engine was replaced by a new overhead-valve design that produced 10 bhp. It also had internal expanding brakes and chain primary drive. Cyril Williams won the first post war 1920 Isle of Man TT Junior race on his 350, even though he had to push the motorcycle home for almost four miles (mostly downhill) after a breakdown. AJS took the first four places in the 1921 Isle of Man TT, and Howard R Davies bettered his second place in the Junior by winning the Senior on the same 350 cc AJS. This was the first time a 350 had won the 500 cc Senior TT race. In 1922 Manxman Tom Sheard won the Junior on an AJS, with G Grinton, also on an AJS, taking second.

The 1922 machine was a classic design that would become famous as the ‘Big Port’ on account of its large-diameter exhaust port and pipe (initially 1 5/8 inches, but changed in successive years). The OHV 350 would be the mainstay of the company's racing efforts until 1927 and in production form (first offered to the public in 1923), was also AJS's most popular sports motorcycle throughout the 1920s. At this time, the company produced a comprehensive range of other models ranging from 250 to 1,000 cc. These were generally given a model number, plus letter to denote the year of manufacture (for example, B meant 1924, F 1925, G 1926).

In 1929 for example, the AJS range consisted of: M1 Deluxe 996 cc side-valve V-twin £76/10/0; M2 Standard 996 cc side-valve V-twin £66/0/0; M3 Deluxe Touring 349 cc side-valve single £48/10/0; M4 Deluxe Sporting 349 cc side-valve single £48/10/0; M5 Standard Sporting 349 cc side-valve single £45/0/0; M6 349 cc overhead-valve single £54/10/0 (twin port), £52/0/0 (single port); MR6 Special Sports 349 cc overhead-valve single £62/0/0; M7 349 cc overhead-camshaft single £62/0/0; M8 498 cc overhead-valve single £62/0/0 (twin port), £59/10/0 (single port); MR8 Special Sports 498 cc overhead-valve single £72/0/0; M9 Deluxe Touring 498 cc side-valve £54/0/0; M10 498 cc overhead-camshaft single £72/0/0; M12 Lightweight 248 cc side-valve single £39/17/6. Several of these were intended to pull one of the 12 AJS sidecars also on offer, including sports, touring and commercial models.

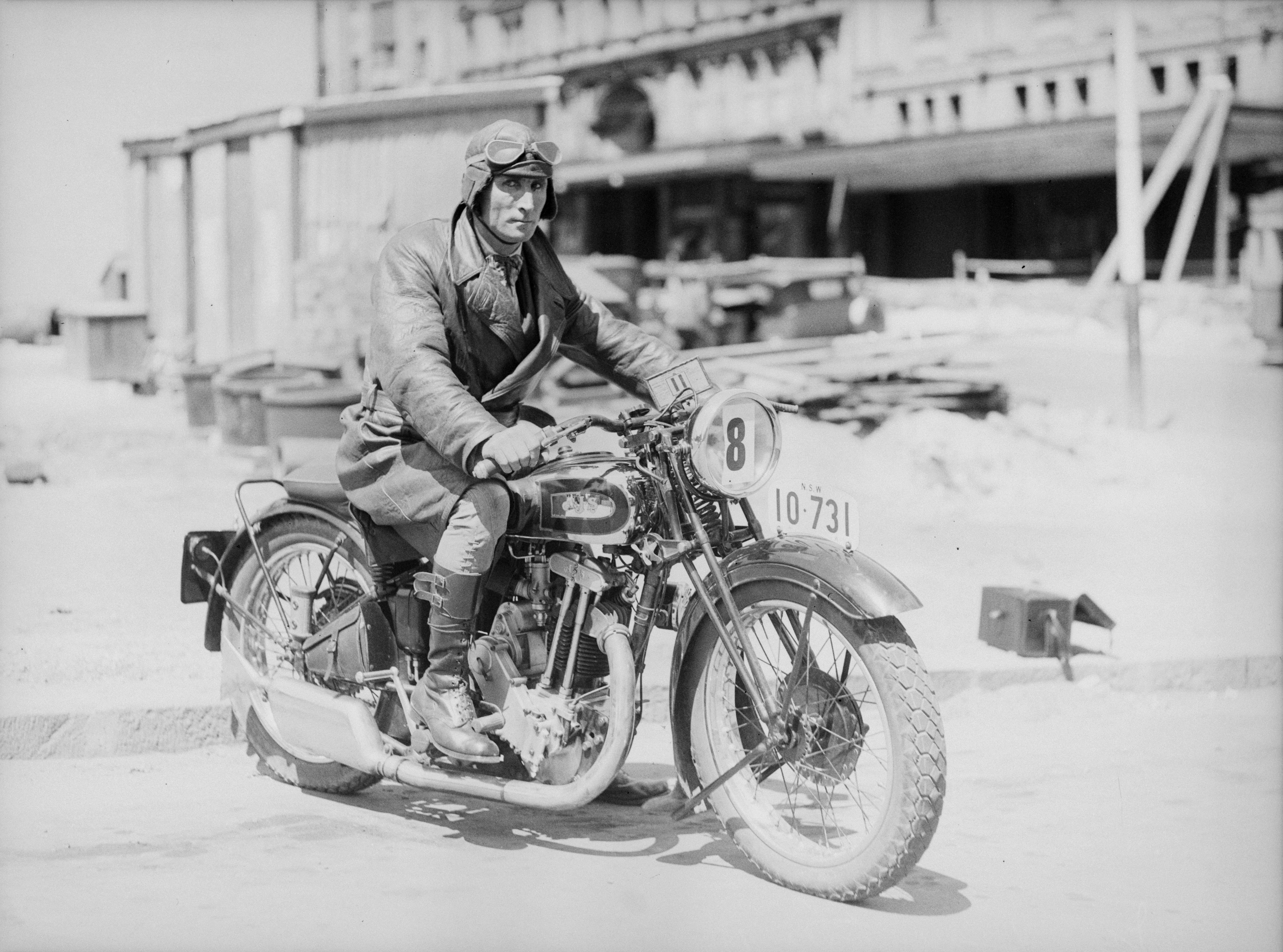
AJS motorbike, Sydney, c. 1930

By 1927, it had become clear that push-rod overhead-valve designs were becoming dated in racing, so AJS introduced two new chain-driven overhead-camshaft racing models, the 349 cc K7 and the 498 cc K10. Jimmy Simpson rode a 350 to third place in the Junior TT and won races in Europe but in 1928 AJS used the overhead-valve engine in the TT. In 1929 there were again two machines with an overhead cam, this time the 349 cc M7 and the 498 cc M10. Wal Handley came second in the 1929 Junior TT for AJS. The following year Jimmie Guthrie won the 1930 Lightweight TT on a 250 cc AJS. The R7,350 ohc, won 8 of the 9 Grand Prix and established at Montlhery, near Paris, a number of world records, including 1 hour at an average of 104.5 miles per hour and 2 hours at an average of 99.5

In 1931, the AJS S3 V-twin was released, a 496 cc transverse V-twin tourer with shaft primary drive and alloy cylinder heads. It had been expensive to develop and was slow to sell. Even though it held 117 world records, the AJS company was now in financial trouble.

The 1935 film No Limit was set at the Isle of Man TT. The film starred George Formby as an aspiring racer who travels to the Isle of Man with his modified and streamlined 1928 "Rainbow" motorcycle, which he has christened a Shuttleworth Snap, in order to compete at the races. In the film fictitious motorcycle companies were used, and the Shuttleworth Snap was in fact a 1928 AJS H5.

=== Automobiles, omnibuses, and coaches ===
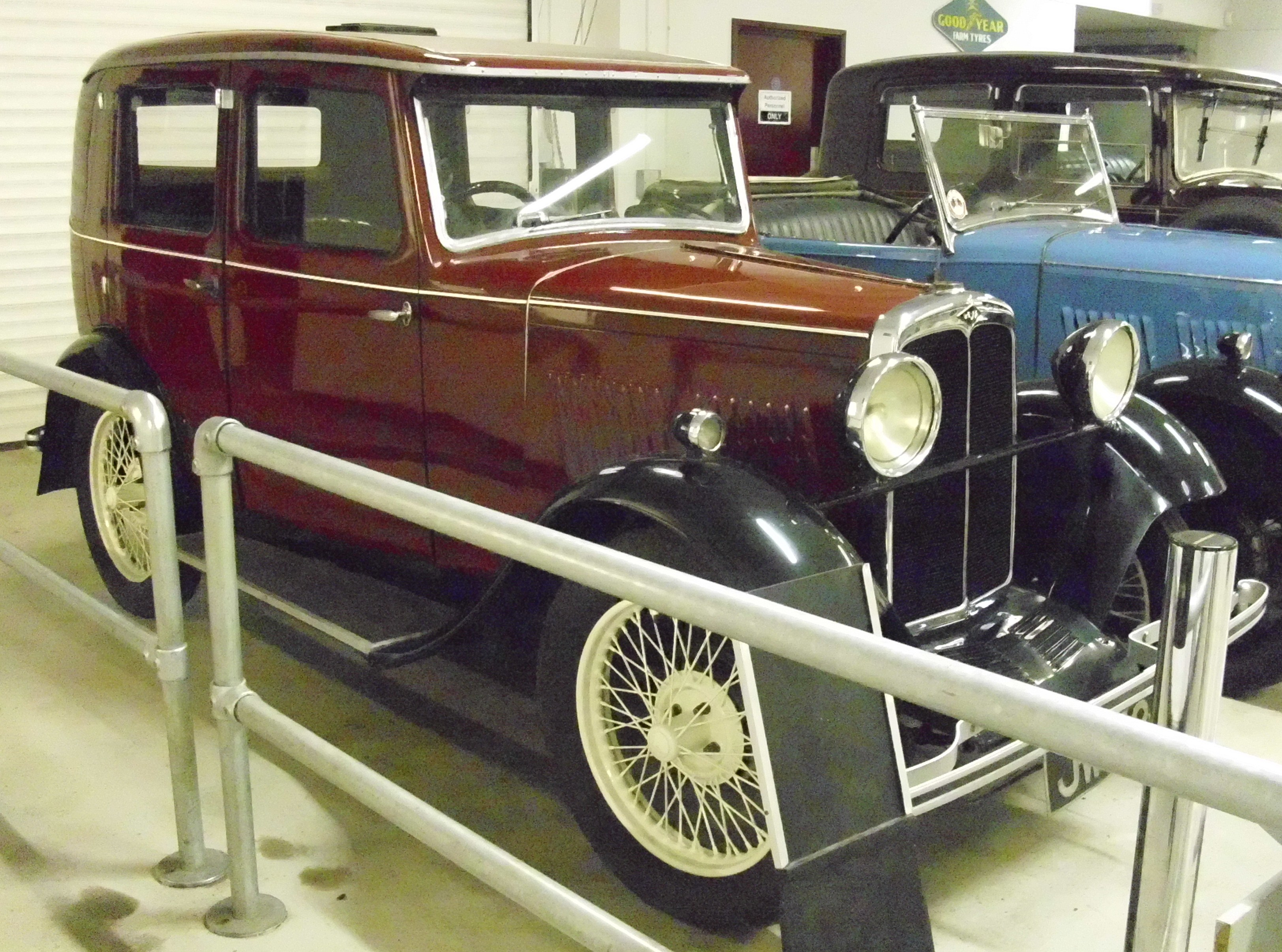
AJS 9 HP (1930–1931) at the Black Country Living Museum

Although best known for their motorcycles the company made a few experimental cars with Meadows engines in 1923 but decided not to go into full production.

AJS had manufactured car bodies for Clyno, but in 1929 Clyno went under. AJS returned to car making in 1929 with the Nine powered by a 1018 cc side-valve Coventry-Climax engine producing 24 bhp (18 kW) and driving through a three-speed gearbox. The cars were quite expensive at £210 for the two-seater and £320 for the fabric bodied saloon. About 1,000 were made.

The company also started making buses and coaches. The first model was the Pilot with a Meadows engine. This was followed by the Commodore with a Coventry Climax L6 engine and finally by the Admiral. Just over 200 buses were built.

In 1931, A. J. Stevens & Co went into administration. After BSA failed to obtain control, the motorcycle assets were bought by the Collier brothers London company Matchless and the car manufacturer Crossley Motors. Crossley incorporated some improvements such as a four-speed gearbox and using parts acquired from AJS built about 300 cars between December 1931 and May 1932. Assembly took place in the Stockport factory used by Willys Overland Crossley. Motorcycle production moved to Plumstead in London.

A 1½-litre model was planned, but failed to materialize except to appear on the Willys-Overland-Crossley stand at the 1932 London Motor Show.

In 1938, AJS became part of a group called Associated Motorcycles, formed by the Colliers as a management company for its various interests. After this Matchless and AJS generally shared models using different badging, although the AJS name was used for several unique racers.

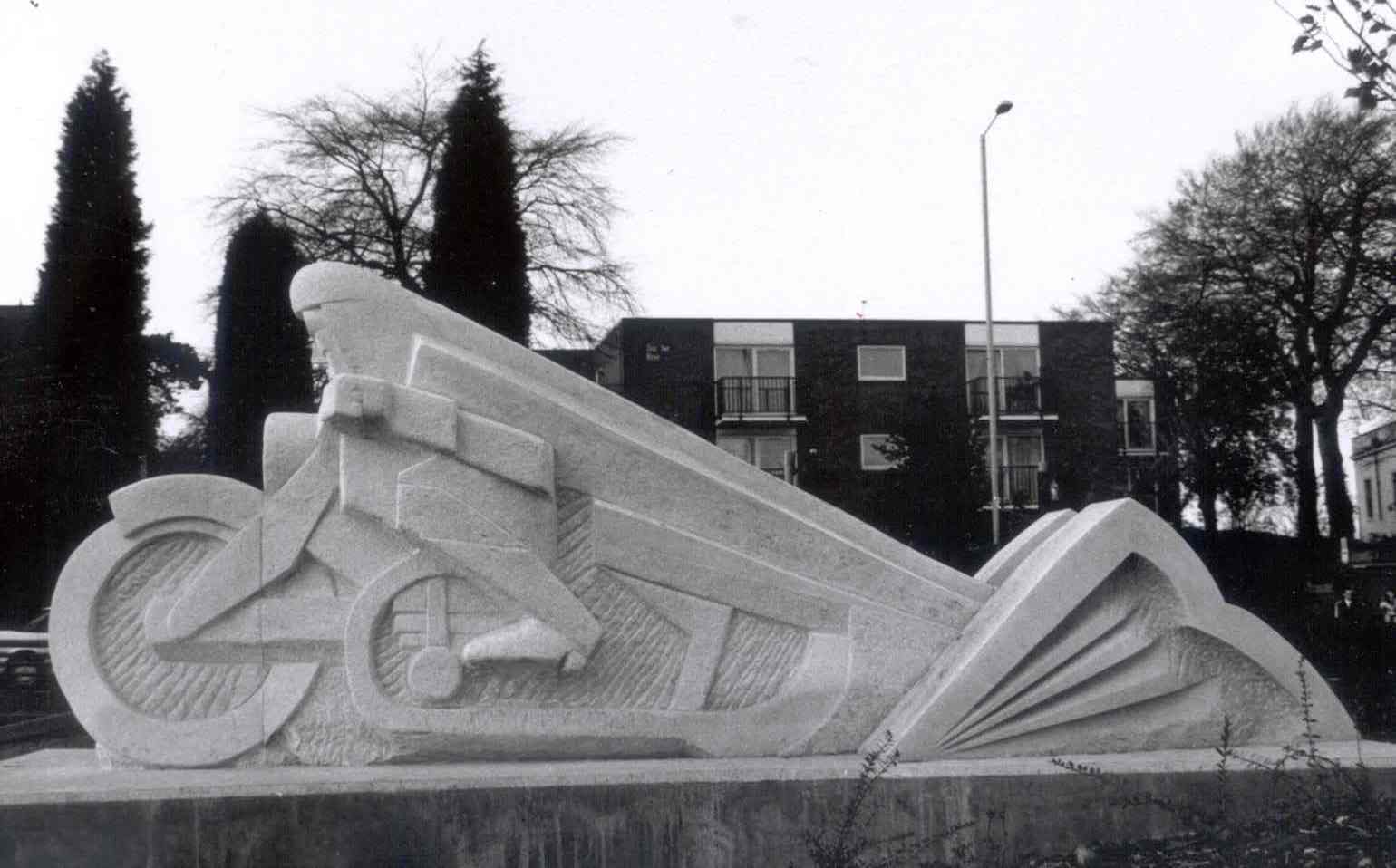
The Lone Rider by Steve Field (1996)

The site of the Wolverhampton factory, now a supermarket, is marked by a sculpture, The Lone Rider, designed by Steve Field and carved by Robert Bowers, assisted by Michael Scheuermann.

=== Stevens Motorcycles ===
The Stevens brothers tried again and started a new company as Stevens Brothers (Wolverhampton) Ltd to make 3-wheel delivery vans. (They could not call them AJS, as that name belonged to the Colliers.) These used a 588 cc single-cylinder engine driving the rear wheels through a 3-speed gearbox and chain drive. The van could carry 5 cwt. It was improved in 1935 with shaft drive and uprated to 8 cwt. The last ones were made in 1936. In 1934 they also produced a new range of motorcycles under the Stevens name. These were made until 1938 after which the company continued until 1956 as a general engineering business.

=== AJS Radios ===
AJS designer Harry Stevens was a keen amateur 'ham' radio operator since before World War I. In 1922, following the launch of Britain's first radio stations and the formation of the BBC he convinced the rest of the AJS board that radio receivers had a big future. The first radios made by AJS Wireless and Scientific Instruments were launched in 1923, all high quality models aimed at the top end of the market. The most expensive cost £75, which was substantially more than many AJS motorcycles, although prices soon fell. Initial sales were good and by 1925, there were 10 models ranging from under £14 in a simple wooden case to over £50 with a finely veneered console cabinet. Radio production was increased and moved to a factory in Stewart Street. However, radio technology had advanced rapidly and AJS was forced to offer new designs in order to compete. The company's reliance on battery power held them back at a time when rivals were turning to mains power and AJS was forced to adopt cheaper mass-production techniques. In 1928, the company decided to give up radio manufacture and sold the factory and remaining components to the Symphony Gramophone and Radio Company.

== AJS Racing under AMC ==
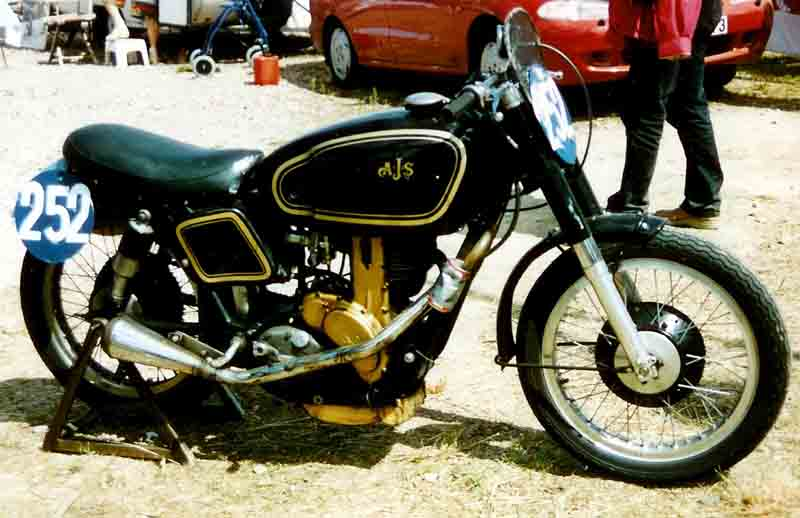
AJS 7R 350 cc Racer 1948

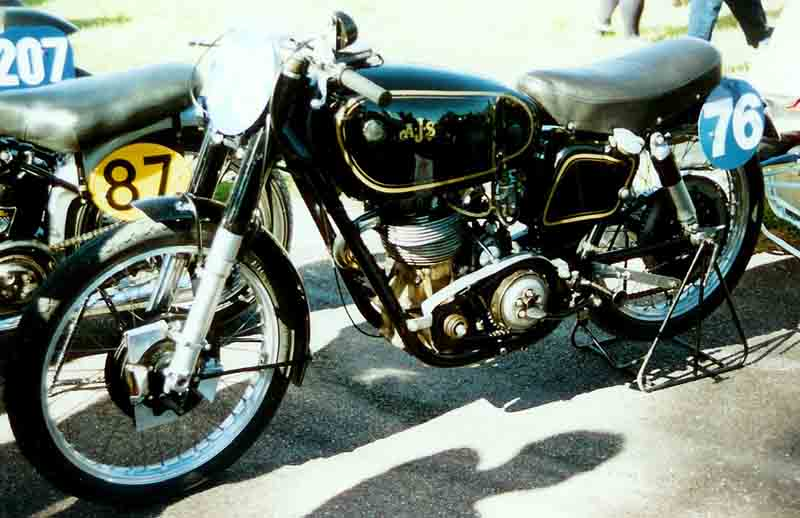
AJS 7R 350 cc Racer 1950

Under AMC the AJS badge may have been put on the "bread and butter" Matchless motorcycles, but the Colliers were mindful of the AJS racing heritage, and used the name on some innovative racing machinery. These racing bikes kept the AJS name alive.

In 1935, at the Olympia Show, an air-cooled SOHC AJS 50° V4 was shown, a fully equipped road going version, which did not make it into production. In 1936 Harold Daniell rode a supercharged race version in the Isle of Man Senior TT, but despite its high top speed, it lacked acceleration.

In 1939, a water-cooled and supercharged version of the 495 cc AJS V4 was built to compete against the supercharged BMWs then dominating racing. In 1939 the dry sump V4 was the first bike to lap the Ulster Grand Prix course at over 100 mph (160 km/h). It weighed 405 lb (184 kg). and its top speed was 135 mph (217 km/h). Then World War II intervened.

At the end of the 1940s and start of the 1950s, the AJS Porcupine, a 500 cc forward-facing parallel twin, and the AJS 7R (32 bhp, 350 cc OHC single) were being raced alongside their AMC stablemates the Matchless G50 (effectively a 500 cc 7R) and by 1951, the Matchless G45 (a 500 cc vertical twin). The AJS Porcupine had been designed for supercharging, before the rules changed banning supercharged racing motorcycles, but even so, Les Graham won the 1949 World Championship on an unsupercharged AJS E90 500 cc Porcupine.

In 1951 AJS development engineer Ike Hatch developed a 75.5 mm bore × 78 mm stroke, three-valve-head version of the 7R making 36 bhp (27 kW). It was called the AJS 7R3, and was Ike's response to the Italian multi-cylinder racers. They did well enough in their first year, not as well the second. For 1954 Jack Williams, the works team manager, developed the bike further, lowering the engine in the frame, and making some tuning changes that gave 40 bhp (30 kW) @ 7800 rpm. It immediately won the first two rounds of the World Championship and took first at the Isle of Man TT. These were factory specials, but one has survived, and a second has been reconstructed from spares.

AMC withdrew from the world of works and one-off road racing at the end of the 1954, with the death of Ike Hatch, and in the face of fierce competition from the other European bikes. After this AJS made a production version of the standard two-valve AJS 7R, for privateers. In 1954 Norton was also moved to the Plumstead works.

With the G15 line, AMC had built on the merits of the G12 but there were numerous changes to frame, forks, swinging arm, primary chaincase, transmission, cycle parts and lubrication system. The P11 was the last line of bikes with bonds to AMC. It used a modified G85CS frame but there were stronger forks, completely new cycle parts (making some was rather costly), altered lubrication and modified primary chaincases, to mention a few.

The G15 series was offered as 3 brands: Matchless G15 comprising G15Mk2, G15CS and G15CSR; AJS Model 33 comprising M33Mk2, M33CS and M33CSR; and last not least Norton N15CS (no Norton-branded roadster made as it would compete against the Atlas). The G15 series was produced from 1963 to 1969. They were initially for export only, but by 1965 these models were available in UK and Europe too.

Associated Motorcycles and the AJS name eventually ended up with Norton-Villiers in 1966. In late 1968 the Plumstead works at Burrage Grove, where engines from the Wolverhampton plant and frames from the Manchester plant were assembled into complete machines, were presented with a Greater London Council compulsory purchase order. The Plumstead works closed in July 1969. It is believed that production of the G15 series was halted late in 1968 (model year 1969) with unsold samples on offer through 1969. The AJS Model 33 was the last AJS badged four-stroke produced.

== AJS two-strokes and Norton road racer ==
From 1962 Cotton motorcycles were the main customer for 250 Starmaker engines. The 250 Starmaker engines were used in the Cotton Cobra scrambler and the Telstar Racer. Cotton therefore was very involved in the development of the Starmaker engine..

Peter Inchely formerly from Ariel and BSA was involved with the 250 Road Race project. Inchley rode a Bultaco-based 6-speed, 250 Villiers Starmaker-powered special to 3rd place in the 1966 Lightweight TT. Several pre production AJS 250 Racers were built and raced but the project came to halt in 1967 after an unsuccessful second TT attempt. The scrambles project continued with considerable success.

From 1966 to 1968, Villiers developed the "Stormer" Motocross motorcycle. In 1968 Malcolm Davis won the British 250 Championship on a pre Stormer, Y4 scrambler.

In late 1967, a special project was undertaken with the Stormer. Four bikes were built at Marston Road, all equipped with spark arrestors on the end of the tailpipe and with a rudimentary lighting system. Three of them had 250 cc engines and were badged as AJS machines. The fourth one had the "360" engine (actually only 334 cc) and was badged as a Matchless. This bike was probably the last one built with a Matchless badge and the only two-stroke Matchless. The four bikes were taken on by members of the Royal Air Force motor Sports Association and entered in the 1968 International Six-Days Trial.

The two-stroke AJSs had been built in Wolverhampton, at the Villiers factory but in 1970 the UK government provided a special subsidy that enabled AJS to open a new factory on Walworth Industrial Estate in Andover, where they assembled Stormer off-road motorcycles. The competition department was located next to the famous race track at Thruxton, Andover.

AJS scramblers were produced from 1968 until 1974 in 250, 370 and 410 guises. The early 250 was designated the Y4. In 1969 The 370 (Y5) was added and the name changed to Stormer. The 410 followed in 1972.

A little known about motorcycle was the 37AT Trials bike which was partially built by Cotton Motorcycles using some AJS parts and Villiers's 37A engine.

By 1974, Norton Villiers was having financial trouble, and the rights to manufacture the Stormer under the AJS banner were purchased. In September 1974 the business was moved to Goodworth Clatford near Andover. Initially selling spare parts for existing motorcycles, the business expanded to produce complete motorcycles still using the Starmaker-based engines under the FB-AJS name.

The Starmaker/Stormer four-speed engine was becoming outdated and could not compete with the new arrivals from manufacturers such as Husqvarna, CZ and later, scrambles bikes from Maico, Suzuki, Honda, Kawasaki and Yamaha.

From 1974 Stormer-based scrambles and trail bikes were sold from modified AJS stock. Keeping the model updated until 1980. During the early 1980s off-road and trail bike with Austrian Rotax engines of 250 cc, 410 cc and 495 cc were produced.

== AJS Motorcycles Ltd. (today) ==
AJS no longer manufacture bikes. Rather they purchase from companies in China. The bikes have AJS logos and other custom detailing features. Their 124cc range are built around the Jianshe JS125 frame and engine. These are first imported from China then distributed through their UK dealer network and exported to Germany, Portugal, Cyprus, Czech Republic, Japan and S. Korea.

=== Recent and current models ===
Model	Years produced	Notes	Type	Photograph
AJS Stormer	2014 ON	Villiers Starmaker-derived 4-stroke engine. Liquid cooled	Road bike	
FB-AJS	1974 - 1987	Villiers Starmaker-derived 2-stroke engine. 250, 370 & 410	Moto-X & Trail	Photograph
Cotton Cobra Replica	1991–2000	Villiers Starmaker-derived 2-stroke engine. 250	Road bike	Photograph
Cotton Telstar Replica	1992–1998	Villiers Starmaker-derived 2-stroke engine. 250	Classic Racer	
Cotton Triumph Replica	1992–2000	Triumph 500 unit twin	Pre-65 Moto-X	Photograph
AJS YX-R 125	2006–2008	4-stroke, air & oil-cooled single-cylinder, 4 valves	Trail	
AJS CR3-125	2006–2008	4-stroke, air-cooled single-cylinder	Sports	
AJS Regal Raptor DD50E	2002–2007	50 cc, 4-stroke, air-cooled single-cylinder	Custom	
AJS Regal Raptor DD125E	since 2005–2019	125 cc, 4-stroke, air-cooled twin-cylinder	Custom	
AJS Regal Raptor DD125E-8 Silverhawk	2007–2008	125 cc, 4-stroke, water-cooled twin-cylinder	Custom	
AJS Regal Raptor Eos 125	2007–2018	125 cc, 4-stroke, water-cooled twin-cylinder	Custom	
AJS Regal Raptor Eos 250	2008–2009	250 cc, 4-stroke, water-cooled twin-cylinder	Custom	
AJS Regal Raptor DD250E-9B	2006–2008	250 cc, 4-stroke, water-cooled twin-cylinder	Custom	
AJS NAC12	2010–2019	125 cc, 4-stroke, liquid-cooled, twin-cylinder	Naked	
AJS Regal Raptor Daytona 125	2010–2019	125 cc, 4-stroke, water-cooled twin-cylinder	Custom	
AJS Regal Raptor Bobber 125	2010–2016	125 cc, 4-stroke, water-cooled twin-cylinder	Old Skool Custom	
AJS Eco1 (JS125-E)	2007–2008	125 cc, 4-stroke, air-cooled, single, OHC, with Balance Shaft	Roadster	
AJS Eco2 (JS125-E)	2009–2015	125 cc, 4-stroke, air-cooled, single, OHC, with Balance Shaft	Roadster	
AJS JSM 125	2009–2011	125 cc, 4-stroke, air-cooled, single, OHC, with Balance Shaft	Super Motard or Trail versions	
AJS Cadwell 125	since 2016	125 cc, 4-stroke, air-cooled, single, OHC, with Balance Shaft	Cafe Racer	
AJS Tempest Roadster 125	since 2018	125 cc, 4-stroke, air-cooled, single, OHC, with Balance Shaft	Classic Roadster	
AJS Tempest Scrambler 125	since 2018	125 cc, 4-stroke, air-cooled, single, OHC, with Balance Shaft	Street Scrambler	
AJS Highway Star 125	since 2019	125 cc, 4-stroke, oil-cooled, twin cylinder, OHC, with EFI	Custom Cruiser	

== See also ==
- List of AMC motorcycles
- List of car manufacturers of the United Kingdom
