= 1978 Formula TT season =

The 1978 Formula TT Season was the second event in the history of Formula TT and was announced by the Fédération Internationale de Motocyclisme as the official world championship in those categories.

The winner of each class's race at the 60th Isle of Man TT also became the TT World Champion in that category.

== Class-System ==
- The Formula TT was divided into three classes in 1977.
  - The TT-F1 class allowed four-stroke engines with engine displacements of 600 to 1000 cc and two-stroke engines with displacements of 350 to 500 cc.
  - The TT-F2 class allowed four-stroke engines with displacements of 400 to 600 cc and two-stroke engines with displacements of 250 to 350 cc.
  - The TT-F3 class allowed four-stroke engines with displacements of 200 to 400 cc and two-stroke engines with displacements of 125 to 250 cc.
- For the last time in Formula TT history, the series consisted of only one race. Starting in 1979, the Ulster Grand Prix, along with the Isle of Man TT, also counted towards the Formula TT World Championship.

== Results ==
References:

== TT-F1-Class ==
The TT F1 race saw the triumphant return of 13-time TT winner and nine-time world champion Mike Hailwood, who had actually already retired from racing and was competing on the Isle of Man for the first time since 1967.

Although Hailwood had the majority of the spectators on his side, he started the race as the outsider on his 900 cc Ducati. He pushed to the limit from the start and was in the lead early on. His fastest lap, which was also the fastest TT lap of Hailwood's career, was set at an average speed of 109.87 mph (176.82 km/h). As the race progressed, Mike Hailwood caught up with and immediately overtook the heavily favored Honda Britain rider Phil Read, who had started ahead of him. Read eventually retired with engine problems on the fifth lap, and Hailwood celebrated the 14th and final TT victory of his career to the cheers of the crowd.

(Snaefell Mountain Course; 6 laps = 364.2 km, the top-ten finishing riders)

1	(United Kingdom) Mike Hailwood	Ducati	2 h 5 min 10.2 s	108.51 mph
2	(United Kingdom) John Williams	Honda	+ 1 min 59.6 s	106.81
3	(United Kingdom) Ian Richards	Kawasaki	+ 2 min 57.4 s	106.01
4	(Germany) Helmut Dähne	Honda	+ 3 min 16.6 s	105.74
5	(United Kingdom) Alex George	Triumph	+ 3 min 18.0 s	105.72
6	(United Kingdom) Chas Mortimer	Suzuki	+ 5 min 40.2 s	103.81
7	(United Kingdom) Malcolm Lucas	BSA	+ 6 min 50.2 s	102.89
8	(United Kingdom) Kevin Wrettom	Kawasaki	+ 6 min 53.0 s	102.85
9	(United Kingdom) Denis Casement	Honda	+ 8 min 16.4 s	101.78
10	(United Kingdom) Ian Tomkinson	Triumph	+ 9 min 06.4 s	101.15

== TT-F2-Class ==
The TT-F2 race was won by Honda rider Alan Jackson Sr. after the leader Bill Smith retired on the last lap.

(Snaefell Mountain Course; 4 laps = 242.8 km, the top-ten finishing riders)

1	(United Kingdom) Alan Jackson Sr.	Honda	1 h 31 min 08.6 s	99.35 mph
2	(United Kingdom) Dave Mason	Honda	+ 1 min 33.4 s	97.68
3	(United Kingdom) Neil Tuxworth	Honda	+ 2 min 58.2 s	96.21
4	(United Kingdom) Ron Haslam	Honda	+ 3 min 51.2 s	95.32
5	(Northern Ireland) Joey Dunlop	Benelli	+ 5 min 47.4 s	95.32
6	(United Kingdom) Peter Davies	Laverda	+ 8 min 29.8 s	93.41
7	(United Kingdom) John Kirkby	Honda	+ 10 min 15.4 s	90.87
8	(United Kingdom) Thomas Williamson	Honda	+ 11 min 41.4 s	88.05
9	(United Kingdom) Denis Casement	Honda	+ 14 min 25.0 s	85.78
10	(United Kingdom) Dave Kerby	Honda	+ 15 min 52.4 s	84.61

== TT-F3-Class ==
In the TT-F3 class, Bill Smith won on Honda, who had retired from the F2 race last year while leading on the last lap.

(Snaefell Mountain Course; 4 laps = 242.8 km, the top-ten finishing riders)

1	(United Kingdom) Bill Smith	Honda	1 h 35 min 50.8 s	94.47 mph
2	(United Kingdom) Derek Mortimer	Yamaha	+ 4 min 41.0 s	90.07
3	(United Kingdom) John Stephens	Honda	+ 4 min 51.0 s	89.92
4	(United Kingdom) Mick Poxon	Honda	+ 6 min 31.2 s	88.45
5	(United Kingdom) Alan Cathcart	Harley-Davidson	+ 7 min 13.4 s	87.85
6	(United Kingdom) Fred Launchbury	Maico	+ 8 min 22.8 s	86.88
7	(United Kingdom) Ken Inwood	Yamaha	+ 8 min 47.6 s	86.53
8	(United Kingdom) Jeff Middleton	Honda	+ 9 min 33.2 s	85.91
9	(United Kingdom) Dennis Trollope	Yamaha	+ 12 min 43.0 s	83.39
10	(United Kingdom) Bill Barker	Honda	+ 12 min 49.2 s	83.33
