= 1977 Formula TT season =

Isle of Man TT Mountain Course

The 1977 Formula TT Season was the first event in the history of Formula TT and was announced by the Fédération Internationale de Motocyclisme as the official world championship in those categories.

The Formula TT was founded in 1977 by the Isle of Man government and the Auto-Cycle Union to compensate for the FIM's withdrawal of the Tourist Trophy's world championship status and at the same time to popularize racing with production-based machines.

The winner of each class's race at the 59th Isle of Man TT also became the TT World Champion in that category.

== Class-System ==
- The Formula TT was divided into three classes in 1977.
  - The TT-F1 class allowed four-stroke engines with engine displacements of 600 to 1000 cc and two-stroke engines with displacements of 350 to 500 cc.
  - The TT-F2 class allowed four-stroke engines with displacements of 400 to 600 cc and two-stroke engines with displacements of 250 to 350 cc.
  - The TT-F3 class allowed four-stroke engines with displacements of 200 to 400 cc and two-stroke engines with displacements of 125 to 250 cc.

== Results ==
References:

== TT-F1 Class ==
The TT-F1 race was ironically won by Phil Read, one of the riders who had campaigned most heavily for the TT to lose its World Championship status. Read had vowed in 1972 never to return to the island. However, he did so in 1977, having been signed by Honda Britain for the Tourist Trophy.

The race itself caused controversy. It was stopped after four laps due to deteriorating weather conditions. After three laps, Ducati rider Roger Nicholls led by 22 seconds. After the fourth lap, he pitted for refueling, while Read crossed the finish line and was declared the winner.

(Snaefell Mountain Course; 4 laps = 242.8 km, the top-ten finishing riders)

| Pos. | Rider | Machine | Time | Avg. Speed |
|---|---|---|---|---|
| 1 | (United Kingdom) Phil Read | Honda | 1 h 33 min 19.3 s | 97.02 mph |
| 2 | (United Kingdom) Roger Nicholls | Ducati | + 38.7 s | 96.36 |
| 3 | (United Kingdom) Ian Richards | Honda | + 1 min 26.7 s | 95.55 |
| 4 | (United Kingdom) Stan Woods | Honda | + 3 min 49.7 s | 93.20 |
| 5 | (United Kingdom) Malcolm Lucas | BSA | + 5 min 02.1 s | 92.06 |
| 6 | (United Kingdom) Michael Hunt | Laverda | + 5 min 49.7 s | 91.32 |
| 7 | (United Kingdom) Roger Corbett | Triumph | + 6 min 32.9 s | 102.89 |
| 8 | (United Kingdom) Ian Tomkinson | BSA | + 8 min 21.9 s | 89.05 |
| 9 | (United Kingdom) John Kirkby | Laverda | + 9 min 53.9 s | 87.72 |
| 10 | (United Kingdom) John Wilkinson | Suzuki | + 9 min 59.9 s | 87.64 |

== TT-F2 Class ==
The TT-F2 race was won by Honda rider Alan Jackson sr. after the leader Bill Smith retired on the last lap.

(Snaefell Mountain Course; 4 laps= 242.8 km, only eight riders reached the finish)

| Pos. | Rider | Machine | Time | Avg. Speed |
|---|---|---|---|---|
| 1 | (United Kingdom) Alan Jackson sr. | Honda | 1 h 31 min 08.0 s | 99.36 mph |
| 2 | (United Kingdom) Neil Tuxworth | Honda | + 1 min 24.6 s | 97.84 |
| 3 | (United Kingdom) Denis Casement | Honda | + 3 min 50.4 s | 95.34 |
| 4 | (United Kingdom) John Crick | Honda | + 11 min 23.2 s | 88.32 |
| 5 | (United Kingdom) Dennis McMillan | Triumph | + 12 min 5*.4 s | 87.38 |
| 6 | (United Kingdom) Terry McKane | Honda | + 15 min 45.0 s | 84.72 |
| 7 | (United Kingdom) Alistair Copeland | Benelli | + 16 min 44.8 s | 83.93 |
| 8 | (United Kingdom) Richard Arain | Honda | + 22 min 41.0 s | 79.56 |

== TT-F3 Class ==
(Snaefell Mountain Course; 4 laps = 242.8 km, the top-ten classified riders)

| Pos. | Rider | Machine | Time | Avg. Speed |
|---|---|---|---|---|
| 1 | (United Kingdom) John Kidson | Honda | 1 h 37 min 04.4 s | 93.28 mph |
| 2 | (United Kingdom) Brian Peters | Suzuki | + 5 min 15.0 s | 88.49 |
| 3 | (United Kingdom) Abe Walsh | Honda | + 5 min 23.6 s | 88.37 |
| 4 | (United Kingdom) Graham Bentman | Honda | + 6 min 04.8 s | 87.78 |
| 5 | (United Kingdom) Fred Launchbury | Maico | + 7 min 14.2 s | 86.83 |
| 6 | (United Kingdom) Mal Kirwan | Honda | + 7 min 53.0 s | 86.27 |
| 7 | (United Kingdom) Nev Watts | Honda | + 10 min 34.6 s | 84.11 |
| 8 | (United Kingdom) Richard Stevens | Yamaha | + 11 min 27.6 s | 84.43 |
| 9 | (United Kingdom) John Riley | Yamaha | + 12 min 06.6 s | 82.98 |
| 10 | (United Kingdom) Paul Feist | Yamaha | + 12 min 26.6 s | 82.68 |

== See also ==
- 1977 Isle of Man TT
