= 1990 Formula TT Season =

The 1990 Formula TT Season was the 14th and last in the history of the Formula TT and was organized by the Fédération Internationale de Motocyclisme as the FIM Formula-TT-Cup.

Five races were held at five events. Reigning Champion Carl Fogarty on a Silkolene sponsored Honda RC30 from Honda Britain defended his title in the TT Formula Cup's final season.

== Scoring System ==
In each race, points were awarded as follows:

Position	1st	2nd	3rd	4th	5th	6th	7th	8th	9th	10th	11th	12th	13th	14th	15th
Points	20	17	15	13	11	10	9	8	7	6	5	4	3	2	1

All results counted towards the Championship.

== Class-System ==
- In 1990, Formula TT was only contested in the TT-F1 class. This allowed four-stroke engines 600 to 1000 cc and Engine displacements and tow-stroke engines with displacements of 350 to 500 cc..

== Regulations and calendar changes ==
The 1990 season marked the 14th and final year of the Formula TT series. Facing intense commercial and political competition from the rapidly growing Superbike World Championship (WorldSBK), which had successfully drawn factory racing programs away from major motorcycle manufacturers, the Fédération Internationale de Motocyclisme (FIM) officially downgraded the series from full World Championship status to "Cup" status. Concurrently, the FIM decreed that the category would be permanently discontinued at the conclusion of the 1990 calendar.

The technical regulations maintained the strict 750 cc limit implemented in previous years to mirror international endurance specifications, restricting the field to prototype or production-based four-stroke engines up to 750 cc alongside two-stroke powerplants from 350 cc to 500 cc.

== Season summary ==
The 1990 championship campaign developed into a transition year dominated by the final structural collapse of the series, alongside a narrative of returning legends and complete individual dominance. Sportingly, the year was completely controlled by the reigning champion Carl Fogarty and the dominant Honda Britain racing division. Utilizing the thoroughly developed Honda RC30, Fogarty focused on securing a third consecutive title before committing his career entirely to the burgeoning Superbike World Championship (WorldSBK).

The international schedule commenced at Sportsland Sugo in Japan on 13 May 1990. Mirroring the previous season, the race was dominated by domestic wildcards and Japanese factory testers with extensive track knowledge. While local competitors claimed the leading positions, Fogarty managed to salvage crucial international championship points by finishing as the highest-placed European permanent entry. The overwhelming dominance of Japanese wildcard entries and factory test riders at Sugo drew sharp criticism in the British motorcycle press, with contemporary reports noting that the severe performance gap significantly disadvantaged permanent European competitors.

The second round returned to a traditional road course layout for the Isle of Man TT on the Snaefell Mountain Course in June. This round marked the highly anticipated international racing return of multi-time champion Joey Dunlop, who had missed the core of the 1989 international season due to severe injuries sustained in a British championship meeting at Brands Hatch. Although Dunlop proved his competitive pace on the mountain course, Fogarty secured a dominant victory in the Formula One TT race, shattering the existing lap records and establishing a commanding lead in the overall points standings.

The third round took place on 1 July 1990 at the exceptionally fast and dangerous Circuito de Vila Real street track in Portugal. Held under punishingly high mid-summer ambient temperatures, the event proved a war of attrition for both machines and riders. The specialized road racing setup of the Honda Britain squad proved superior, allowing Fogarty to take a commanding victory ahead of his continental rivals, effectively putting the championship out of mathematical reach for the chasing field. Fogarty's relative ease in commanding the 1990 Formula TT field highlighted the changing landscape of international racing; contemporary media interviews noted that while Fogarty controlled the road-based F1 events comfortably, he faced far more strenuous competition trying to break into the top tier of the short-circuit World Superbike paddock.

The championship then traveled north to the tight, bumpy, and temporary Kouvola street circuit in Finland on 15 July. The venue, highly criticized by the British paddock for its unyielding track barriers and a layout deemed tight for high-powered 750 cc machinery, saw Fogarty claim yet another maximum points haul to formally secure the title over fellow Honda competitors before the final round. The safety limitations of the Kouvola layout led to intense paddock disputes prior to the race; the British press detailed severe friction between the riders and FIM officials regarding the usage of street circuits lined with unyielding obstacles for modern 750 cc racing machinery.

The final round of the Formula TT era took place on 11 August 1990 at the Ulster Grand Prix on the Dundrod Circuit in Northern Ireland. With Fogarty already crowned as the champion, the race became a historic celebration for local spectators as Joey Dunlop secured an emotional victory. Dunlop’s triumph at Dundrod signaled his complete recovery from his career-threatening injuries, while Northern Ireland's Brian Reid brought his Yamaha home to secure third place in the final standings. This event marked the final competitive race of the FIM Formula TT series before its permanent dissolution in favor of production-based global superbike racing.

== Results ==
=== Race results ===
1990 Formula TT Calendar
	Date	Race	Circuit	1st Place	2nd Place	3rd Place
1	13th of May	Japan	Sugo	Ken’ichirō Iwahashi	Shoji Miyazaki	Peter Goddard
2	2nd of June	Isle of Man	Mountain Course	Carl Fogarty	Nick Jefferies	Robert Dunlop
3	1st of July	Portugal	Vila Real	Carl Fogarty	Robert Dunlop	Joey Dunlop
4	15th of July	Finland	Kouvola	Carl Fogarty	Ben Nyman	Steve Manley
5	11th of August	Northern Ireland	Dundrod	Joey Dunlop	Robert Dunlop	Dave Leach

== Riders' standings ==
1990 FIM Formula TT Cup standings
Pos.	Rider	Bike	Pts.
1	(United Kingdom) Carl Fogarty	Honda	71
2	(Northern Ireland) Joey Dunlop	Honda	54
3	(Northern Ireland) Robert Dunlop	Norton	49
4	(United Kingdom) Dave Leach	Yamaha	34
5	(United Kingdom) Steve Ward	Honda	30
6	(Japan) Ken’ichirō Iwahashi	Honda	20
7	(France) Marc Granié	Yamaha	19
8	(Japan) Shoji Miyazaki	Honda	17
	(United Kingdom) Nick Jefferies	Yamaha	17
10	(Finland) Ben Nyman	Kawasaki	17
11	(United Kingdom) Steve Williams	Yamaha	16
12	(Australia) Peter Goddard	Yamaha	15
	(United Kingdom) Steve Manley	Yamaha	15
14	(United Kingdom) Bob Jackson	Honda	15
15	(Japan) Yasutomo Nagai	Yamaha	13
	(United Kingdom) Brian Morrison	Honda	13
	(Northern Ireland) Phillip McCallen	Honda	13
	(Sweden) Mikael Lundvall	Kawasaki	13
19	(Northern Ireland) Johnny Rea Sr.	Honda	11
20	(Japan) Tadashi Ohshima	Honda	10
	(United Kingdom) Trevor Nation	Norton	10
22	(United States) Doug Polen	Suzuki	9
	(Australia) Graeme McGregor	Honda	9
	(Portugal) Manuel Joao Sagres	Kawasaki	9
	(Soviet Union) Juri Raudsik	Honda	9
26	(United Kingdom) Nigel Barton	Honda	9
27	(Japan) Mitsuo Saitō	Yamaha	8
	(United Kingdom) Charlie Corner	Honda	8
29	(Japan) Tadaaki Hanamura	Yamaha	7
	(United Kingdom) Steve Hislop	Honda	7

	(Portugal) Alex Laranjeira	Suzuki	7
	(Finland) Pentti Tolonen	Yamaha	7
	(Northern Ireland) Mark Farmer	Kawasaki	7
34	(Japan) Shingo Kato	Yamaha	6
	(Portugal) Pedro Batista	Honda	6
	(Switzerland) Hanspeter Bolliger	Kawasaki	6
	(Northern Ireland) Brian Reid	Yamaha	6
38	(Japan) Naoto Abe	Kawasaki	5
	(United Kingdom) Dave Woolams	Ducati	5
	(Finland) Terho Pitkänen	Suzuki	5
	(United Kingdom) Iain Duffus	Honda	5
42	(Japan) Masanao Aoki	Yamaha	4
	(United Kingdom) Geoff Johnson	Yamaha	4
	(United Kingdom) Russell Benney	Honda	4
	(Soviet Union) Mart Lajal	Kawasaki	4
46	(Japan) Yoshio Machii	Honda	3
	(United Kingdom) Ray Hutchinson	Honda	3
	(Finland) Kimmo Kopra	Honda	3
	(New Zealand) Robert Holden	Honda	3
50	(Japan) Kosei Yamamoto	Honda	2
	(United Kingdom) Howard Selby	Yamaha	2
	(Belgium) Jerôme van Haeltert	Suzuki	2
	(Finland) Pertti Komujärvi	Ducati	2
	(United Kingdom) Gary Weston	Yamaha	2
55	(United States) Richard Moore	Kawasaki	1
	(United Kingdom) Gary Radcliffe	Honda	1
	(United Kingdom) John Caffrey	Yamaha	1
	(Germany) Heinz Platacis	Kawasaki	1
	(Northern Ireland) Alan Irwin	Honda	1
Source: FIM TT Formula World Championships PDF.

== Bibliography ==
- Motorbooks Intl. Peter Clifford (December 1990). Motocourse 1990-91: The World's Leading Grand Prix Annual. Hazelton Publishing. ISBN 0905138759.
- Fred Hanks. T.T. Special Yearbook - Vol.8 (1990). Birmingham: T.T. Special.
- Road Racer Illustrated Yearbook 1990. Cycle News Inc.
- FIM Annuaire Officiel 1990 / Official Yearbook 1990. Geneva: FIM Secretariat. Fédération Internationale de Motocyclisme. (1990).
