= 1989 Formula TT season =

The 1989 Formula TT Season was the 13th in the history of the Formula TT and was the last time the Fédération Internationale de Motocyclisme organized it as an Official World Championship.

Six races were held at six events. Carl Fogarty gained the 1989 Formula TT Championship Title on a Honda RC30 from Honda Britain.

== Scoring System ==
In each race, points were awarded as follows:

Position	1st	2nd	3rd	4th	5th	6th	7th	8th	9th	10th	11th	12th	13th	14th	15th
Points	20	17	15	13	11	10	9	8	7	6	5	4	3	2	1

All results counted towards the Championship.

== Class-System ==
- In 1989, Formula TT was only contested in the TT-F1 class. This allowed four-stroke engines 600 to 1000 cc and Engine displacements and tow-stroke engines with displacements of 350 to 500 cc..
- The race in the Netherlands was held as part of the Dutch TT on the Motorcycle World Championship schedule.

== Regulations and calendar changes ==
For the 1989 season, the Fédération Internationale de Motocyclisme (FIM) implemented a major structural reduction by officially dissolving the Formula II and Formula III classes due to a lack of international manufacturer entries. This left the premier Formula I (TT-F1) category as the sole class contesting the world championship. Following regulatory updates designed to align the series with international endurance trends, the technical rules restricted the category to prototype or production-based four-stroke engines up to 750 cc, alongside two-stroke engines from 350 cc to 500 cc.

The championship calendar reflected increasing commercial and political pressure from the newly established Superbike World Championship, which competed directly for manufacturer-backed development teams. To maintain international spectatorship and secure larger grids, several Formula TT rounds were integrated into existing high-profile motorcycling race weekends. Notably, the third round of the championship was held at the TT Circuit Assen as a support event during the same weekend as the Dutch TT, though it operated entirely outside the official Grand Prix world championship classification for that meeting.

== Season summary ==
The championship developed into a season-long internal team duel between two British Honda Britain riders aboard the dominant Honda RC30: the reigning champion Carl Fogarty and Scotland's Steve Hislop. The team's dynamic shifted significantly early in the racing year when their multi-time champion teammate Joey Dunlop suffered severe injuries, including a fractured leg and a badly broken wrist, during a collision at the Brands Hatch Easter meeting on Good Friday (24 March 1989). With Dunlop sidelined for the initial international rounds, Hislop stepped up as the focal point for the squad's championship aspirations alongside Fogarty and Brian Morrison. Journalistic focus shifted dramatically following the pre-season injury of five-time champion Joey Dunlop, with the press closely analyzing how his replacement, Steve Hislop, adapted to the factory Honda Britain squad.

The opening round took place at Sportsland Sugo in Japan, where domestic competitors dominated the field. Australian rider Michael Dowson won the event ahead of Yamaha's Yasutomo Nagai, while the primary championship contenders failed to achieve podium positions. The second round returned to a traditional road racing format at the Isle of Man TT, where Hislop secured a dominant victory on the Snaefell Mountain Course to establish his title credentials. Hislop's history-making performance at the Isle of Man TT—where he broke the 120 mph lap barrier—became a major sporting headline, forcing mainstream outlets to cover the event in detail, complete with technical sector analyses.

At Assen, Fogarty responded by winning the TT-F1 support event ahead of Swiss rider Andreas Hofmann. The fourth round at the Circuito de Vila Real in Portugal was held under high ambient temperatures; Hislop won the race to regain the points advantage, with Fogarty finishing second. At the subsequent round on the Kouvola street circuit in Finland, the venue faced safety criticisms from the riders' paddock due to unyielding barriers and a track width deemed narrow for 750 cc machinery. Fogarty won the race ahead of Hislop, leaving the two teammates separated by a narrow points margin ahead of the final event.

The championship concluded at the Ulster Grand Prix on the Dundrod Circuit in Northern Ireland. Hislop won the race, securing his third victory of the season. Knowing that a podium position would guarantee the title, Fogarty maintained a conservative strategy to finish in second place. This result gave Fogarty a final total of 90 points to Hislop's 82, securing his second consecutive FIM World Championship.

The championship also served as a focal point for intense technical debates within the motorsport press regarding the inclusion of the JPS Norton RCW588 Wankel rotary bike. Magazines like Performance Bikes published comprehensive engineering features questioning the FIM's equivalent displacement regulations, which allowed the rotary-powered machines to compete directly against conventional 750 cc four-stroke machinery, culminating in Steven Cull's podium finish at the final round at Dundrod.

== Results ==
=== Race results ===
1989 Formula TT Calendar
	Date	Race	Circuit	1st Place	2nd Place	3rd Place
1	14th of May	Japan	Sugo	Michael Dowson	Yasutomo Nagai	Yukiya Ōshima
2	3rd of June	Isle of Man	Mountain Course	Steve Hislop	Brian Morrison	Nick Jefferies
3	23rd of June	Netherlands	Assen	Carl Fogarty	Andreas Hofmann	Roger Burnett
4	2nd of July	Portugal	Vila Real	Steve Hislop	Carl Fogarty	Brian Morrison
5	16th of July	Finland	Kouvola	Carl Fogarty	Steve Hislop	Jari Suhonen
6	12th of August	Northern Ireland	Dundrod	Steve Hislop	Carl Fogarty	Steven Cull

== Riders' standings ==
1989 Formula TT Riders' Championship standings
Pos.	Rider	Bike	Pts.
1	(United Kingdom) Carl Fogarty	Honda	90
2	(United Kingdom) Steve Hislop	Honda	82
3	(Northern Ireland) Joey Dunlop	Honda	54
4	(United Kingdom) Brian Morrison	Honda	42
5	(United Kingdom) Charlie Corner	Honda	30
6	(Finland) Jari Suhonen	Yamaha	28
7	(United Kingdom) Nick Jefferies	Yamaha	25
8	(United Kingdom) Steve Williams	Yamaha	25
9	(United Kingdom) Jamie Whitham	Suzuki	21
10	(Australia) Michael Dowson	Yamaha	20
11	(United Kingdom) Dave Leach	Yamaha	19
12	(Japan) Yasutomo Nagai	Yamaha	17
	(Switzerland) Andreas Hofmann	Kawasaki	17
14	(Japan) Yukiya Ōshima	Suzuki	15
	(United Kingdom) Roger Burnett	Honda	15
	(Northern Ireland) Steven Cull	Norton	15
17	(New Zealand) Robert Holden	Honda	14
18	(Northern Ireland) Sam McClements	Honda	14
19	(Australia) Rob Phillis	Kawasaki	13
20	(Japan) Ken’ichirō Iwahashi	Honda	11
	(Australia) Graeme McGregor	Honda	11
22	(United States) Doug Polen	Suzuki	10
	(Netherlands) Jeffry de Vries	Yamaha	10
24	(Japan) Noboru Miura	Honda	9
	(Sweden) Mikael Lundvall	Kawasaki	9
26	(Northern Ireland) Phillip McCallen	Honda	9
27	(Japan) Mistuo Saito	Yamaha	8
	(United Kingdom) Andy McGladdery	Honda	8

	(United Kingdom) Ian Jones	Ducati	8
	(Finland) Esko Kuparinen	Honda	8
31	(Japan) Jun Maeda	Honda	7
	(Switzerland) Toni Rohrer	Honda	7
	(Portugal) Pedro Batista	Honda	7
	(Sweden) Christer Lindholm	Suzuki	7
35	(Japan) Shoji Miyazaki	Honda	6
	(United Kingdom) Colin Gable	Honda	6
	(United Kingdom) Trevor Nation	Yamaha	6
	(United Kingdom) Russell Benney	Honda	6
	(Finland) Erkki Siukola	Suzuki	6
	(New Zealand) Dennis Ireland	Honda	6
41	(Japan) Shoichi Tsukamoto	Kawasaki	5
	(Republic of Ireland) Eddie Laycock	Honda	5
43	(United Kingdom) Tony Moran	Yamaha	5
44	(Japan) Tadaaki Hanamura	Yamaha	4
	(United Kingdom) Steve Ward	Honda	4
	(United Kingdom) Brent Gladwin	Honda	4
	(Northern Ireland) Woolsey Coulter	Honda	4
48	(West Germany) Peter Rubatto	Bimota	3
	(Sweden) Göran Forsslund	Suzuki	3
50	(Japan) Tadashi Ohshima	Honda	2
	(United Kingdom) Bob Jackson	Honda	2
	(Sweden) Peter Sköld	Honda	2
53	(Japan) Tatsuro Arata	Yamaha	1
	(Sweden) Peter Lindén	Honda	1
	(United Kingdom) Steve Lindsell	Yamaha	1
Source: FIM TT Formula World Championships PDF.

== Bibliography ==
- Motorbooks Intl. Peter Clifford (1989). Motocourse 1989-90: The World's Leading Grand Prix Annual. Hazelton Publishing. ISBN 0905138635.
- Fred Hanks. T.T. Special Yearbook - Vol.7 (1989). Birmingham: T.T. Special.
- Tsuguji Urushima. Motor Cycle Racing Yearbook 1989. Japan Riders Club Co Ltd.
- FIM Annuaire Officiel 1989 / Official Yearbook 1989. Geneva: FIM Secretariat. Fédération Internationale de Motocyclisme (1989).
