= Formula TT =

Motorcycle racing class

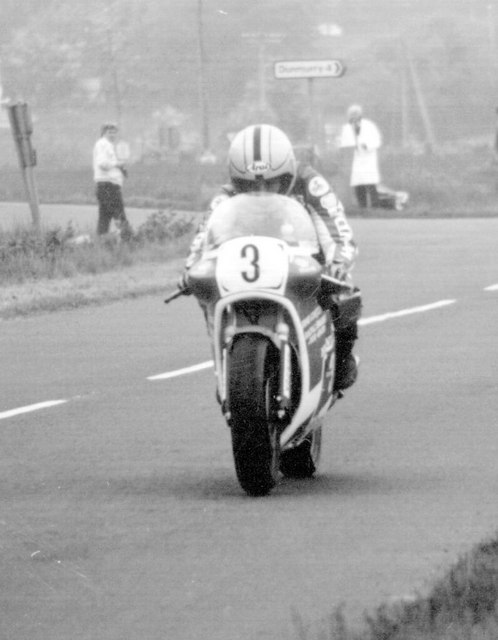
Joey Dunlop, five times TT-F1 world champion, in action at the 1982 Ulster Grand Prix

The Formula TT was a racing class for motorcycles from 1977 to 1990 as the official World Cup under the umbrella of International Motorcycling Federation. It was in three engine capacity classes, and was divided into both two and four-stroke engines.

== History ==
From 1949 to 1976 the Isle of Man TT was part of the Motorcycle Grand Prix World Championship and was the home of the British Grand Prix. The event came under increasing scrutiny due to safety concerns despite efforts by the ACU to retain its world championship status. When Italian rider Gilberto Parlotti was killed during the 1972 TT, his close friend and the reigning world champion Giacomo Agostini, announced that he would never again race on the Isle of Man. More riders joined Agostini's boycott and by the 1976 season, only a handful of serious Grand Prix riders were among the entrants. Shortly after the 1976 TT, the FIM made the long-anticipated announcement that the TT, once the most prestigious race on the Grand Prix calendar, was stripped of its world championship status. The Grand Prix action was moved to the UK with the 1977 British Grand Prix being held at Silverstone.

The race authorities of the Isle of Man TT worked with Auto Cycle Union to set up a new formula that would include racing on the Isle of Man. This series was the result of that collaboration.

For the first two years all three formula were run as part of the Isle of Man TT:

- 1977 One event: Tourist Trophy, Isle of Man
- 1978 One event: Tourist Trophy, Isle of Man

In 1979 a second race was added:

- 1979 Two events: Tourist Trophy, Isle of Man; Ulster Grand Prix, Dundrod (Northern Ireland)
- 1980 Two events: Tourist Trophy, Isle of Man; Ulster Grand Prix, Dundrod (Northern Ireland)
- 1981 Two events: Tourist Trophy, Isle of Man; Ulster Grand Prix, Dundrod (Northern Ireland)

For the start of the 1982 season Formula III was dropped and the number of circuits was increased:

- 1982 Three events: Tourist Trophy, Isle of Man, Vila Real, Portugal; Ulster Grand Prix, Dundrod (Northern Ireland)
- 1983 Four events: Tourist Trophy, Isle of Man; TTF1, Dutch TT - Assen (Netherlands); Ulster Grand Prix, Dundrod (Northern Ireland); and TTF2, Assen (second meeting at the circuit)
- 1984 Six events: TTF1-TTF2, Tourist Trophy, Isle of Man; TTF1, Dutch TT - Assen (Netherlands), TTF1-TTF2, Vila Real (Portugal); TTF1-TTF2, Ulster GP, Dundrod (Northern Ireland); TTF2, Brno (Czechoslovakia);TTF1, Zolder (Belgium),
- 1985 Six events: TTF1-TTF2, Tourist Trophy, Isle of Man; TTF1, Dutch TT - Assen (Netherlands); TTF1-TTF2, Vila Real (Portugal); TTF1-TTF2, Montjuich (Spain); TTF1-TTF2, Ulster GP, Dundrod (Northern Ireland); TTF1, Hockenheim (Germany)
- 1986, Eight events: TTF1, San Marino motorcycle Grand Prix, Misano (Italy); TTF1, Hockenheim (Germany); TTF1-TTF2, Tourist Trophy, Isle of Man; TTF1, Dutch TT - Assen (Netherlands); TTF1-TTF2, Jerez (Spain); TTF1, Vila Real (Portugal); (TTF1) Imatra (Finland); and TTF1-TTF2, Ulster GP, Dundrod (Northern Ireland)

For the remaining four seasons only Formula I races were run:

- 1987 Seven events: Misano (Italy); Hungaroring (Hungary); Tourist Trophy; Isle of Man, Dutch TT - Assen (Netherlands); Sugo (Japan); Hockenheim (Germany); and Donington Park (England).
- 1988, Eight events: Sugo (Japan); Tourist Trophy, Isle of Man; Dutch TT - Assen (Netherlands); Vila Real (Portugal); Kouvola (Finland); Dundrod (Northern Ireland); Pergusa (Italy); and Donington Park (England)
- 1989, six events: Sugo (Japan); Tourist Trophy, Isle of Man; Dutch TT - Assen (Netherlands); Vila Real (Portugal); Kouvola (Finland); and Dundrod (Northern Ireland).
- 1990, five events: Sugo (Japan); Tourist Trophy, Isle of Man; Vila Real (Portugal); Kouvola (Finland); and Dundrod (Northern Ireland).

In 1988 a rival series called the Superbike World Championship started and as it proved popular and commercially successful, it was decided to end the Formula TT at the end of the 1990 season.

== Technical regulations ==
The TT Formula was divided into three categories:

- Formula I - four-stroke from 600 to 1000 cc (reduced to 750 cc since 1984) and two-stroke 350 to 500 cc
- Formula II - four-stroke from 400 to 600 cc and two-stroke 250 to 350 cc
- Formula III - four-stroke from 200 to 400 cc and two-stroke 125 to 250 cc

== List of winners ==
Year	Formula III	Formula II	Formula I
1977	(United Kingdom) John Kidson (Honda)	(United Kingdom) Alan Jackson jr. (Honda)	(United Kingdom) Phil Read (Honda)
1978	(United Kingdom) Bill Smith (Honda)	(United Kingdom) Alan Jackson jr. (Honda)	(United Kingdom) Mike Hailwood (Ducati)
1979	(Australia) Barry Smith (Yamaha)	(United Kingdom) Alan Jackson jr. (Honda)	(United Kingdom) Ron Haslam (Honda)
1980	(United Kingdom) Ron Haslam (Honda)	(United Kingdom) Charlie Williams (Yamaha)	(New Zealand) Graeme Crosby (Suzuki)
1981	(Australia) Barry Smith (Yamaha)	(United Kingdom) Tony Rutter (Ducati)	(New Zealand) Graeme Crosby (Suzuki)
1982		(United Kingdom) Tony Rutter (Ducati)	(United Kingdom) Joey Dunlop (Honda)
1983		(United Kingdom) Tony Rutter (Ducati)	(United Kingdom) Joey Dunlop (Honda)
1984		(United Kingdom) Tony Rutter (Ducati)	(United Kingdom) Joey Dunlop (Honda)
1985		(United Kingdom) Brian Reid (Yamaha)	(United Kingdom) Joey Dunlop (Honda)
1986		(United Kingdom) Brian Reid (Yamaha)	(United Kingdom) Joey Dunlop (Honda)
1987			(Italy) Virginio Ferrari (Bimota)
1988			(United Kingdom) Carl Fogarty (Honda)
1989			(United Kingdom) Carl Fogarty (Honda)
1990			(United Kingdom) Carl Fogarty (Honda)
