= Yasutomo =

- Pronunciation: jasɯtomo (IPA)
- Gender: Male

Origin
- Origin: Japanese
- Meaning: Different meanings depending on the kanji used

Yasutomo is a masculine Japanese given name.

== Written forms ==
Yasutomo can be written using many different combinations of kanji characters. Here are some examples:

- 靖友, "peaceful, friend"
- 靖朝, "peaceful, morning/dynasty"
- 靖智, "peaceful, intellect"
- 靖朋, "peaceful, companion"
- 靖知, "peaceful, intellect"
- 康友, "healthy, friend"
- 康朝, "healthy, morning/dynasty"
- 康智, "healthy, intellect"
- 康朋, "healthy, companion"
- 康知, "healthy, intellect"
- 安友, "tranquil, friend"
- 安朝, "tranquil, morning/dynasty"
- 保友, "preserve, friend"
- 保朝, "preserve, morning/dynasty"
- 保智, "preserve, intellect"
- 泰友, "peaceful, friend"
- 泰朝, "peaceful, morning/dynasty"
- 易朝, "divination, morning/dynasty"

The name can also be written in hiragana やすとも or katakana ヤストモ.

== Notable people with the name ==
- Yasutomo Kubo (久保 康友; born 1980), Japanese baseball player
- Yasutomo Nagai (永井 康友; 1965–1995), Japanese motorcycle racer
- Yasutomo Suzuki (鈴木 康友; born 1957), Japanese politician

== Fictional characters ==
- Yasutomo Arakita (荒北 靖友), from manga series Yowamushi Pedal
