= 1926 Isle of Man TT =

Annual motorcycle racing event

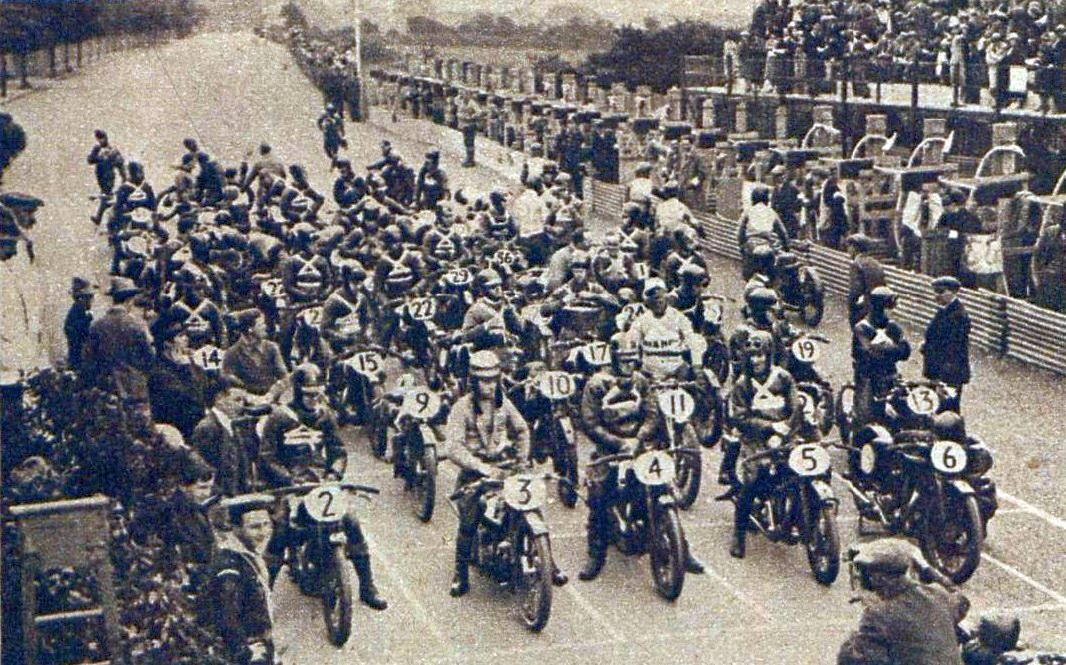
A race start at the 1926 Tourist Trophy

Further changes occurred in the 1926 Isle of Man Tourist Trophy with the scrapping of the Side-Car TT and Ultra-Lightweight TT Races from the lack of entries. Most of the TT Course had now been tarmacked, including the Snaefell Mountain Section. Another change in 1926 was the ban on alcohol based fuels, forcing competitors to use road petrol. Despite these changes the prestige of the Isle of Man TT Races had encouraged the Italian motor-cycle manufacturers Bianchi, Garelli and Moto Guzzi to enter.

The 7 lap (264.11 miles) 1926 Junior TT race was won by Alec Bennett riding a 350 cc overhead-camshaft Velocette motor-cycle, in 3 hours, 57 minutes and 37 seconds, at an average speed of 66.70 mph.

The 1926 Lightweight TT Race produced one of the most notorious events in the history of the Isle of Man TT Races, described by "The Motor-Cycle" Magazine as the "Guzzi Incident." The Italian rider Pietro Ghersi was excluded from second place for using a different sparking-plug in the engine of his Moto Guzzi. Despite the competition from the Italian marques the 1926 Lightweight TT Race was won by 'Paddy' Johnston riding a Cotton motor-cycle, in 4 hours, 23 minutes and 16 seconds, at an average speed of 60.24 mph for the 7 lap race.

The 1926 Senior TT Race was less controversial and was won by Stanley Woods riding for Norton for the first-time by 4 minutes from Wal Handley. The 1926 Senior TT Race produced the first 70 mph (113 km/h) lap and was again set by Jimmie Simpson on an AJS motorcycle in 32 minutes and 9 seconds an average speed of 70.43 mph.

== Senior TT (500 cc) ==
Rank	Rider	Team	Speed	Time
1	(Republic of Ireland) Stanley Woods	Norton	67.54 mph	3.54.39.8
2	(United Kingdom) Wal Handley	Rex-Acme	66.31	3.59.00.6
3	(United Kingdom) Frank Longman	AJS	66.03	4.00.03.4
4	(United Kingdom) Joe Craig	Norton	64.75	4.04.47.0
5	(United Kingdom) Clarrie Wood	HRD	64.02	4.07.35.0
6	(United Kingdom) George Rowley	AJS	63.96	4.07.48.6
7	(Italy) Achille Varzi	Sunbeam	63.8	4.08.05.0
8	(United Kingdom) Sidney Jackson	HRD	63.4	4.10.22.0
9	(United Kingdom) Kenneth Twemlow	HRD	62.8	4.12.03.6
10	(United Kingdom) Graham Walker	Sunbeam	62.7	4.12.35.0

== Junior TT (350 cc) ==
Rank	Rider	Team	Speed	Time
1	(United Kingdom) Alec Bennett	Velocette	66.704 mph	3.57.37.0
2	(United Kingdom) Jimmie Simpson	AJS	63.903	4.08.02.0
3	(United Kingdom) Wal Handley	Rex-Acme	63.375	4.10.06.0
4	(United Kingdom) Freddie Dixon	Douglas	63.249	4.10.30.0
5	(United Kingdom) Gus Kuhn	Velocette	62.345	4.14.14.0
6	(United Kingdom) Gordon Burney	Royal Enfield	60.849	4.20.29.0
7	(United Kingdom) Hough Hough	AJS	60.77	4.20.47.0
8	(United Kingdom) Frank Longman	AJS	60.35	4.22.32.0
9	(United Kingdom) Fred Povey	Velocette	60.12	4.23.30.0
10	(United Kingdom) Jack Amott	Montgomery	59.92	4.24.31.0

== Lightweight TT (250 cc) ==
Rank	Rider	Team	Speed	Time
1	(Republic of Ireland) Paddy Johnston	Cotton	60.204 mph	4.23.16.0
2	(United Kingdom) George Morgan	Cotton	55.129	4.47.30.0
3	(United Kingdom) Billy Colgan	Cotton	53.532	4.56.05.0
4	(United Kingdom) Sammy Jones	New Imperial	53.049	4.58.47.0
5	(United Kingdom) Fred Bicknell	Royal Enfield	48.471	5.27.00.0
6	(United Kingdom) E Archibald	OK-Supreme	47.58	5.33.06.0
7	(United Kingdom) Sid Gleave	Diamond	47.40	5.36.59.0
8	(United Kingdom) George Shepherd	New Imperial	45.09	5.51.30.0

Only 8 finishers
