= Tony Rutter =

British motorcycle racer (1941–2020)

- Nationality: British
- Born: 24 September 1941
- Died: 24 March 2020 (aged 78)
Motorcycle racing career statistics
Grand Prix motorcycle racing
Active years	1969 – 1976
First race	1969 250cc Ulster Grand Prix
Last race	1976 350cc Isle of Man TT
First win	1973 350cc Isle of Man TT
Last win	1974 350cc Isle of Man TT
Starts / Wins / Podiums / Poles / F. laps / Points; 22 / 2 / 5 / 2 / 1 / 151

Tony Rutter (24 September 1941 – 24 March 2020) was a British professional motorcycle road racer. He was a street circuit specialist, who won seven Isle of Man TT Races between 1973 and 1985.

== Racing career ==
Rutter competed in the Grand Prix motorcycle world championships from 1969 to 1976. He was the British road racing national champion in the 350cc class in 1971, on a Yamaha, and the 250cc class in 1973 again on a Yamaha.

Rutter won seven Isle of Man TT races: the Junior TT in 1973 and 1974, the Formula 2 TT in 1981, 1982, 1983 and 1985, and the Senior 350 TT in 1982. He also finished second at the 1979 Senior TT, second at the 1985 Formula 1 TT, and third at the 1984 Formula 1 TT.

Rutter completed the first-ever 110 mph lap of the North West 200 circuit in 1973. He was inducted into the North West 200 Hall of Fame after winning the event nine times.

Rutter also won four consecutive Formula Two World Championships from 1981 to 1984.

Rutter's career was effectively ended by a very bad accident at the Montjuïc circuit in Barcelona, Catalonia, Spain, in 1985 – however even after this incident he recovered and continued to ride in the TT until 1991.

== Personal life and death ==
Rutter died on 24 March 2020, at the age of 78 following a short illness. His son, Michael, followed in the footsteps of his father and became a professional motorcycle racer.

In 2024, Glen Helen 1, a right corner on the Snaefell Mountain Course in the Isle of Man, was named Rutter's in recognition of the collective achievements of both Michael and Tony Rutter, tallying 14 TT wins and 38 podiums.

Sporting positions
Preceded by Charlie Williams	TT Formula Two World Champion; 1981–1984	Succeeded by Brian Reid
