= Brian Reid (motorcyclist) =

Northern Irish motorcycle racer

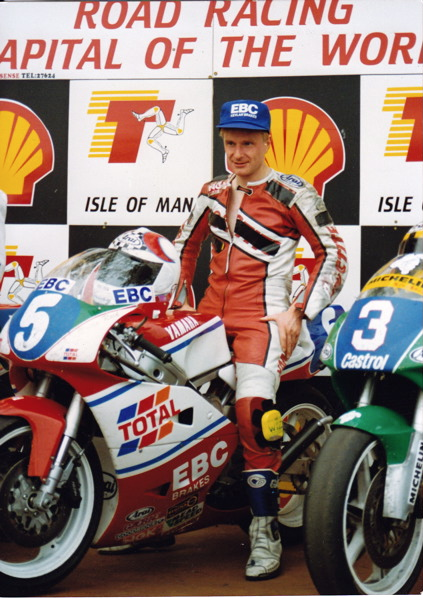
- Reid, winner of Junior TT race 1993
- Nationality: Northern Irish
Motorcycle racing career statistics
Isle of Man TT career
| TTs contested | 14 1981 – 1994 |
| TT wins | 5 |
| First TT win | 1986 Formula Two TT |
| Last TT win | 1993 Junior TT |
| TT podiums | 10 |

Brian Reid is a former motorcycle road racer and World Formula Two Champion from Northern Ireland.

== Biography ==
Reid started racing in 1976 at St. Angelo airfield, Enniskillen, and had his first road race the same year at the Dundrod Circuit in Killinchy 150, riding a TD3 250 Yamaha. His first road race win came in 1979 at a wet Carrowdore meeting riding a 125cc Morbidelli.

Reid first tackled the Isle of Man course for the Manx Grand Prix in 1978, riding a Yamaha TZ250 which seized in the Newcomers race and threw him off at Cruickshanks corner in Ramsey. His best result at the Manx was a second place in the Senior race riding a Ray Cowles-sponsored RG500 Suzuki in 1980.

Reid's first TT race came in 1981, without much luck, but he won the first of his national championships the 350cc Ulster Grand Prix that same year.

In 1982, Reid created history by becoming the first rider to win three Irish road race championships in one year, taking the 250cc, 350cc and 500cc titles. In 1984, he made it a clean sweep winning 3 Ulster Championships and three Irish Championships the 250cc, 350cc and 500cc categories the first time that had been done. 1983 saw him crowned Irish Motorcyclist of the Year which he also won again in 1989.

In 1984, Reid turned his attention to the Formula TT world championship racing, sponsored by Mick Mooney of Irish Racing Motorcycles on a privately entered 350cc Yamaha. In that first year Reid collected a bronze medal and, but for a breakdown at the Ulster Grand Prix, could have been gold. Reid made amends in 1985 by taking gold with wins in Portugal, Spain and the Ulster, and repeated the feat in 1986 to be a double world champion; he also had the first of his 5 TT wins in this year.

1989 saw the launch of the Regal 600cc championship which Reid dominating from the beginning, taking the title on the Budweiser Yamaha. He retained his title in 1990 and won his second TT in the Supersport 600cc. Reid went on to take TT wins in 1992, with a double in the Supersport 400cc and Junior 250cc, and in 1993 with a Junior 250cc win.

In 1994, Reid's career ended when he was involved in a serious accident at the Temple 100, which ultimately caused his retirement from racing.

== Race statistics ==
- International Isle of Man TT wins: 5
  - 1986 Formula 2
  - 1990 Junior Supersport 600
  - 1992 Junior 250
  - 1992 Supersport 400
  - 1993 Junior 250
- International Ulster GP wins: 9
  - 1983 250cc
  - 1983 350cc
  - 1985 Formula 2
  - 1987 250cc
  - 1988 250cc
  - 1989 600cc
  - 1990 250cc
  - 1992 250cc
  - 1992 400cc
- International North West 200 wins: 1
  - 1989 600cc
- Irish Short Circuit Championship wins: 9
  - 250cc 2 Championships between 1982 – 1994
  - 400cc 3 Championships 1991
  - 600cc 4 Championships between 1989 – 1991
- Regal 600 Championships: 2
  - 1989 Supersport 600cc
  - 1990 Supersport 600cc
- Isle of Man National Road Race wins: 5
  - 2nd 1980 Manx GP
  - 5 Senior Southern 100 Race wins between 1982 – 1983

=== Race wins ===
- North West 200
  - 1989 Supersport 600 Yamaha 110.350 mph
- Isle of Man TT
  - 1986 Formula 2 Yamaha 350 109.72 mph
  - 1990 Supersport 600 Yamaha 111.98 mph
  - 1992 Junior Yamaha 250 115.13 mph
  - 1992 Supersport 400 Yamaha 110.50 mph
  - 1993 Junior Yamaha 250 115.14 mph
- Ulster Grand Prix
  - 1983 250cc Yamaha 98.69 mph
  - 1983 350cc Yamaha 97.76 mph
  - 1985 Formula 2 Yamaha 350 111.19 mph
  - 1987 250/350cc Yamaha 350 108.28 mph
  - 1988 250/350cc EMC 250 109.09 mph
  - 1989 Supersport 600 Yamaha 112.252 mph
  - 1990 250/400cc Yamaha 250 116.033 mph
  - 1992 250/400cc Yamaha 250 112.14 mph
  - 1992 Supersport 400 Yamaha 107.31 mph
- Killinchy 150
  - 1984 350cc Yamaha 110.41 mph
  - 1987 350cc Yamaha 112.06 mph
  - 1988 250/350cc Yamaha 350 112.07 mph
  - 1989 Supersport 600 Yamaha 110.85 mph
  - 1990 250/350cc Race 1 Yamaha 250 113.65 mph
  - 1990 250/350cc Race 2 Yamaha 250 114.27 mph
  - 1990 Supersport 600 Yamaha 113.75 mph
- Dundrod 150
  - 1993 250cc Yamaha 101.11 mph

Sporting positions
| Preceded by Tony Rutter | TT Formula Two World Champion; 1985–1986 | Succeeded by None |
