= Bill Smith (motorcyclist) =

British motorcycle racer

- Nationality: British
- Born: 8 February 1935 (age 91)
- Website: Bill Smith Motors
Motorcycle racing career statistics
Grand Prix motorcycle racing
Active years	1963 – 1971, 1976
First race	1963 Isle of Man 250cc Lightweight TT
Last race	1976 Isle of Man 500cc Senior TT
Starts / Wins / Podiums / Poles / F. laps / Points; 14 / 0 / 4 / 0 / 0 / 62

Bill Smith (born 8 February 1935) was a British former Grand Prix motorcycle road racer.

Smith's specialty was on street circuits such as the Isle of Man TT, the North West 200 and the Ulster Grand Prix. His best season was in 1963 when he finished the year in 12th place in the 500cc world championship. Smith won the 350 class at the 1968 North West 200. In 1978, he won the Formula III Class in the Formula TT World Championship.

Sporting positions
Preceded by John Kidson	TT Formula Three World Champion; 1978	Succeeded by Barry Smith
