= Isle of Man TT =

Annual motorcycle race event on the Isle of Man

Coordinates: 54°10′02″N 4°28′44″W

Isle of Man Tourist Trophy
- Genre: Public road race course
- Frequency: Annually, May–June
- Venue: Isle of Man TT Mountain Circuit
- Location: Isle of Man
- Inaugurated: 1907
- Previous event: 2026 Isle of Man TT
- Next event: 2027 Isle of Man TT
- Organiser: ACU Events Ltd
- People: Gary Thompson MBE BEM (clerk of the course)
- Sponsor: Isle of Man Department for Enterprise (principle)

The Isle of Man TT (Tourist Trophy) races are an annual motorcycle racing event that has been held on the Isle of Man in May and June most years since its inaugural race in 1907. The two-week event is sanctioned by the Auto-Cycle Union, which also organises the event. The Manx government owns the rights to and promotes the event.

The Isle of Man TT is a series of time-trial format races, run on public roads closed for racing. The event consists of one week of practice and qualifying sessions, followed by one week of racing. The closed public roads form the Snaefell Mountain Course, a 37.73-mile (60.72 km) route containing 219 turns that traverses through a mix of urban and rural areas. The event currently features 5 different classes of road racing, each competing in two races over the course of the racing week. Since the inaugural Isle of Man TT in 1907, the event has been held mostly every year since, with seasons being cancelled only due to war or disease outbreak. The TT has become part of the local culture and economy of the Isle of Man with more than 40,000 visitors annually travelling to the island for the event.

== History ==
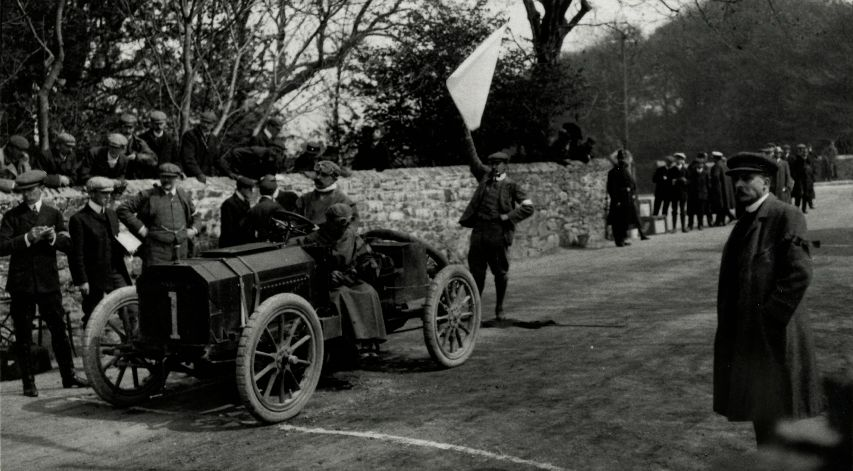
A Napier automobile at the start line of the 1904 Gordon Bennett Trials

Motor racing began on the Isle of Man in 1904 with the Gordon Bennett Eliminating Trial, restricted to touring automobiles. The Motor Car Act 1903 placed a speed restriction of 20 mph (32 km/h) on all automobiles in the UK, effectively restricting road racing activities. Julian Orde, Secretary of the Automobile Car Club of Britain and Ireland approached the authorities on the Isle of Man for the permission to race automobiles on the island's public roads. The Manx government agreed, and passed the Highways (Light Locomotive) Act. This gave permission for the 1904 Gordon Bennett Eliminating Trial to take place on the Isle of Man around the 52.15-mile (83.93 km) Highroads Course. The first year of the trial was won by Clifford Earl (Napier) in 7 hours 26.5 minutes, driving five laps of the Highroads Course for a total of 255.5 mi or 411.2 km. The following year, the Gordon Bennett Trial was held on 30 May 1905, and was again won by Clifford Earl driving a Napier automobile, completing six laps in 6 hours and 6 minutes. In September 1905, the first Isle of Man Tourist Trophy Race for automobiles, now known as the RAC Tourist Trophy was held. This race was won by John Napier (Arrol-Johnston) in 6 hours and 9 minutes at an average speed of 33.90 mph (54.56 km/h).

In 1905, it was decided to run an eliminating trial for motorcycles the day after the Gordon Bennett Eliminating Trial. This was to qualify a team to represent Great Britain in the International Motor-Cycle Cup Race held in Austria. The inability of the motorcycles to climb the steep Mountain Section of the course forced the organisers to use a smaller 25-mile (40 km) section of the Gordon Bennett Trial course that included less elevation. This ran from Douglas south to Castletown and then north to Ballacraine along the primary A3 road, returning to the start at the Quarterbridge in Douglas via Crosby and Glen Vine along the current Snaefell Mountain Course in the reverse direction. The 1905 International Motor-Cycle Cup Race consisted of five laps, and was won by J.S. Campbell (Ariel) despite a fire during a pit stop. Campbell completed the 125 mi (201 km) race distance in 4 hours, 9 minutes and 36 seconds at an average race speed of 30.04 mph (48.34 km/h).

The 1906 International Motor-Cycle Cup race was plagued by accusations of cheating and fraudulence. Frustrated by the experience, the Secretary of the Auto-Cycle Club, Freddie Straight, brothers Charlie Collier and Harry Collier of Matchless Motorcycles, and the Marquis de Mouzilly St. Mars (president of the FICM) had a conversation on the train journey home that led to a suggestion of a race the following year for road touring motorcycles based on the automobile races held on the Isle of Man.

=== Early history (1907–1948) ===
At the Annual Auto Cycle Club dinner party on 17 January 1907, the editor of Motorcycle Magazine formally proposed this new race for motorcycles on the Isle of Man. This new race, named the Auto-Cycle Tourist Trophy, was to take inspiration from the earlier motorcycle trial race that was held in 1905, running on a shorter course with less elevation than the mountain course used by automobiles. This shorter course, named the St. John’s Short Course formed a 15.85 mile triangular shape, and the race was set at 10 laps for a 158.5 mi (255 km) overall distance. Based on the touring oriented style racing at the time, two classes were established for the Auto Cycle Tourist Trophy based on number of cylinders and fuel economy. The first was a single cylinder class, with a fuel economy limit of 90 miles per gallon of fuel, and the second was a two cylinder class, with fuel economy limit of 75 miles per gallon of fuel throughout the race. The machines competing were mandated to be touring motorcycles equipped with saddles, pedals, mudguards, exhaust silencers, and a toolkit.

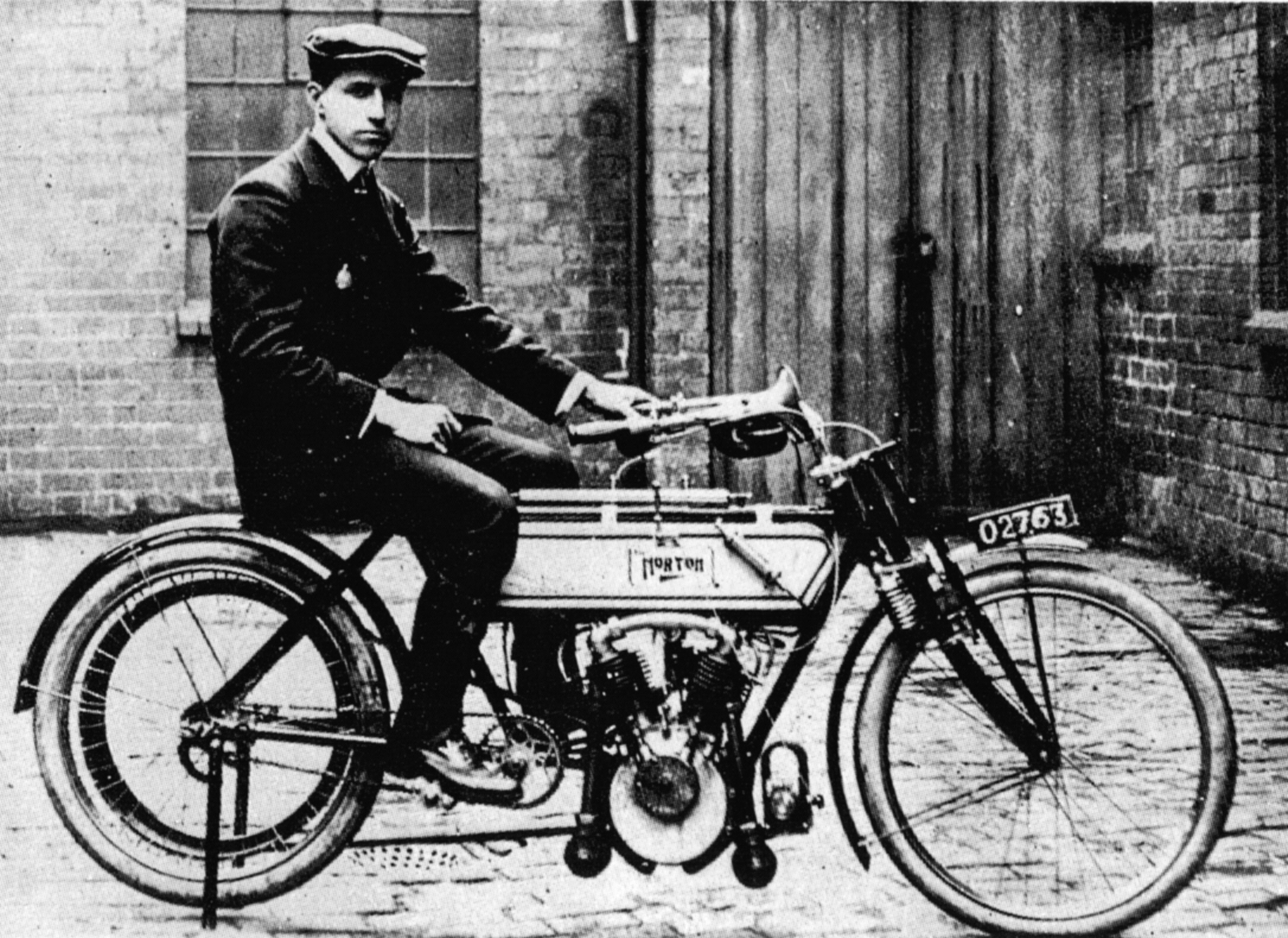
Rem Fowler and his Peugeot engined Norton

The first Isle of Man TT race was held on Tuesday 28 May 1907. Charles Collier won the single cylinder class riding a Matchless machine at an average speed of 38.22 mph. Rem Fowler won the two cylinder class riding a Peugeot engined Norton at an average speed of 36.22 mph. Of the 25 race entrants, only 12 finished the race. Auto-Cycle Tourist Trophy Races continued for the next four years on the St John's Short Course. For the 1908 race, the fuel consumption was raised to 100 mpg for single-cylinder machines and 80 mpg for twin-cylinder machines and the use of pedals was banned. The 1908 race was won by Jack Marshall on a Triumph motorcycle at an average speed of 40.49 mph (65.16 km/h). In 1909, the fuel consumption regulations were abandoned along with the use of exhaust silencers. The single-cylinder machines were limited to a capacity of 500cc and the twins to a 750cc engine capacity. Due to the concern over increasing lap-speed, the 1910 event saw the capacity of the twin-cylinder machines reduced to 670cc. By 1910, the last year of the short course, the average speed had risen to 55.15 mph, achieved by Charlie Collier riding on a Matchless motorcycle.

Due to the ever increasing speeds and technical innovations seen in previous years' competitions, the 1911 TT was moved to the much longer and challenging Snaefell Mountain Course. At the time this course was 37.40 miles (60.19 km) long, with its layout differing slightly from the current mountain course. Similar to the short course of the previous years, much of the mountain course consisted of unpaved dusty tracks with loose rutted surfaces that created many obstacles for the riders to overcome. The two classes were changed and renamed as the Senior and Junior classes. The Senior class permitted single cylinder machines with engines displacing up to 500cc and two cylinder machines with engines up to 500cc. The Junior class permitted 300cc single cylinder and 340cc two cylinder motorcycles. Each class was run in their own separate race, instead of together as in previous years. The Senior race was five laps and the Junior race was four laps. The steep gradients of the mountain course made the single gear machines of the past years obsolete, requiring manufacturers to develop some type of transmission to be competitive. American built Indian motorcycles proved to be well suited to the mountain course and won the top three positions in the Senior TT race. Oliver Godfrey won the Senior class with an average speed of 47.63 mph. The 1911 TT recorded the first fatality at the motorcycle race with Victor Surridge dying from a crash during practice.

The Isle of Man TT continued in a similar format for the next three years. The 1912 race was boycotted due to protests from some Isle of Man residents regarding the safety of the event. Despite this the TT continued, albeit with a much reduced entry list. Additionally the classes were tweaked for 1912 with both single and two cylinder motorcycles being held to the same engine displacement, 500cc for the Senior, and 350cc for the Junior. The 1913 race saw a large rebound in the number of entrants compared to the previous year. The race format was changed, now with two races per class. A six lap Junior race was split up into two races, a two lap event, and a four lap event. The seven lap Senior race was split up, starting with a three lap event, with another 4 lap race being run concurrently with the 4 lap Junior race. The 1914 race was the last to be held before the outbreak of World War I; motorcycle racing would not return to the Isle of Man until 1920.

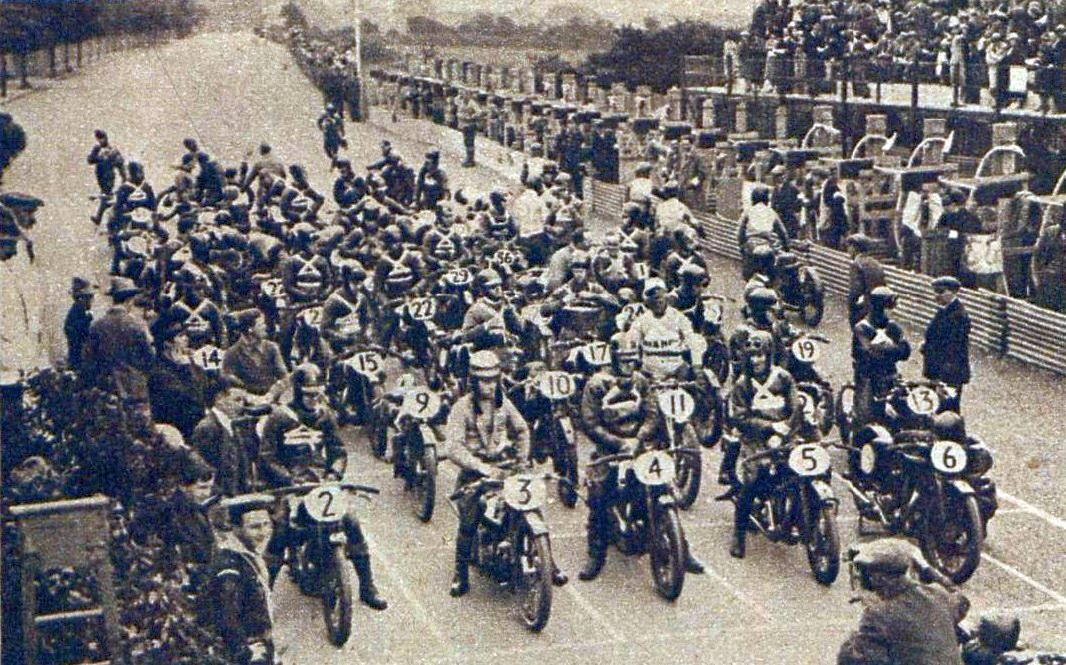
The starting grid of one of the races in 1926

With sufficient entries to satisfy the ACU, the TT returned in 1920 with multiple changes made to the event. The course was altered to its current 37.75 mile format, with the riders now starting at the top of Bray Hill. A new Lightweight class was added as part of the Junior race. This Lightweight class permitted motorcycles displacing up to 250cc. The first and second place winners of the 1920 Senior TT were the first to finish a TT with an average speed over 50 miles per hour. In the following 1921 TT, Howard Davies became the first and only rider to have ever won a Senior TT while riding a Junior TT machine. By 1922, the Lightweight class had proved to be popular enough that it became its own five lap race, for a total of three separate races in the event. The 1923 running of the TT saw Stanley Woods win his first TT in the Junior race. Another class change came in 1923 with the introduction of the Sidecar class being run in its own three lap race. Freddie Dixon and Walter Perry won this inaugural sidecar race at an average speed of 53.15 miles per hour.

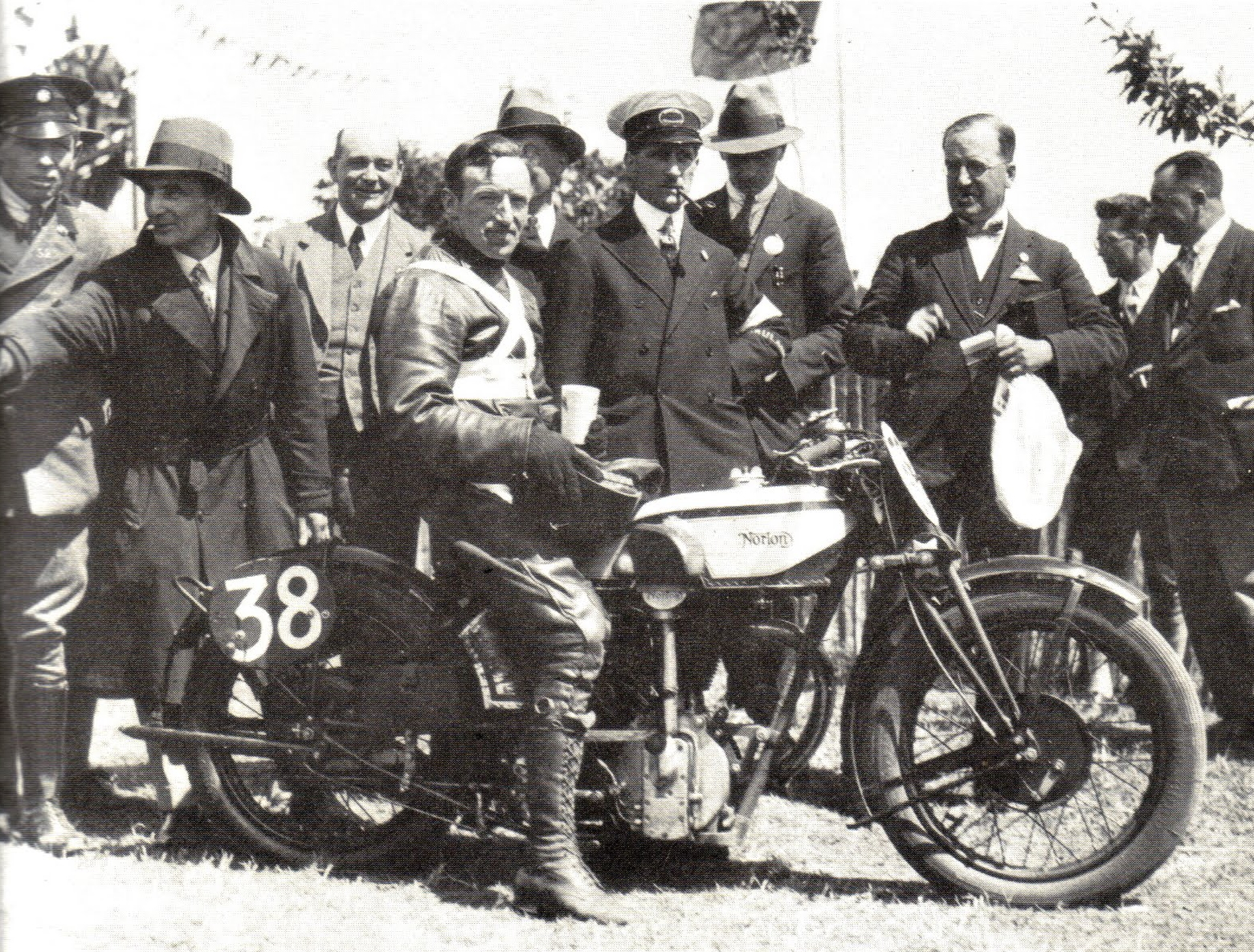
Alex Bennett atop his 1927 Senior TT winning Norton

A new Ultra-Lightweight Class was added for the 1924 TT, which permitted machines displacing up to 175cc, competing in their own race. The 1924 Lightweight TT was unique in that it was a "mass start" event in which the entire grid started at the same time, contrary to the typical TT races in which the riders started one by one at set time intervals. In 1925 Wal Handley became the first rider ever to win two TT races in one week, taking first place in both the Junior and Ultra-Lightweight races. In 1926 the ACU removed both the Sidecar and the Ultra-Lightweight classes due to a lack of entries. Additionally, there was pressure from the manufacturers to remove the sidecar class due to their feelings that racing was not the best way to promote sidecar sales. This left only the Senior, Junior and Lightweight classes, each running in their own seven lap race. The 1926 TT also produced the first ever 70 mile per hour lap, set by Jimmy Simpson who had also set the first 60 mile per hour lap average. Throughout the 1920s road conditions on the Mountain Course gradually improved, and by the end of the decade almost the entire mountain section was paved. The improved course, combined with motorcycle development saw lap records consistently broken during this period.

From the first Isle of Man TT in 1907 all the way through 1927, practice occurred with the roads open. Therefore, riders had to avoid pedestrians and vehicles that were going about their daily business. During a practice session for the 1927 TT, rider Archie Birkin swerved to dodge a fish van on the road and ended up hitting a wall. He died from his injuries, and this incident prompted the ACU to close roads for practice every year thereafter.

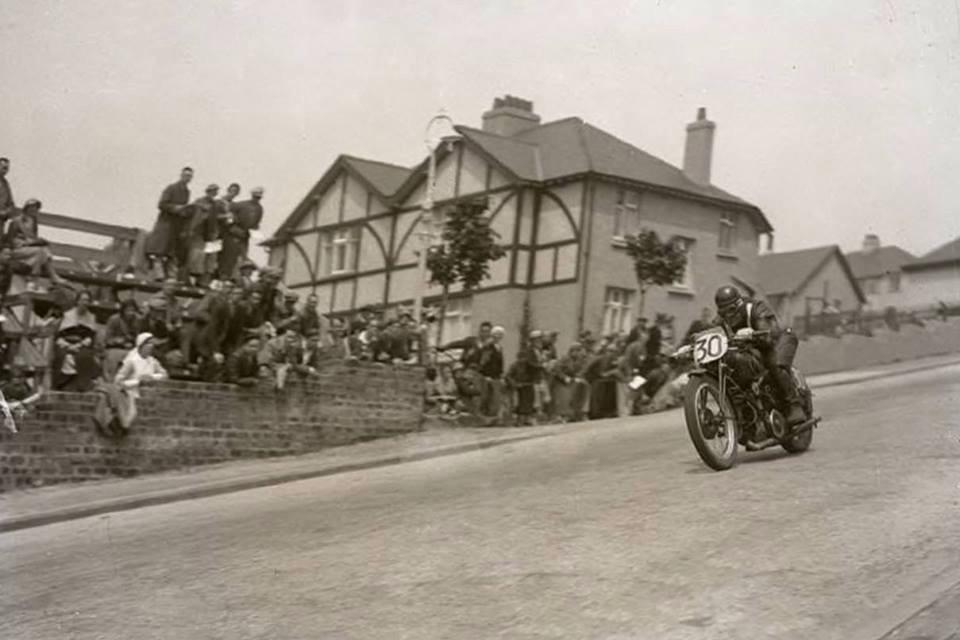
Stanley Woods descending Bray Hill in the 1935 TT

The popularity of the TT had been building throughout the 1920s and by 1930, portions of the Senior TT were broadcast by BBC for the first time. The increase in popularity brought an increase in the prize money, which in turn attracted more participants. The 1930 race saw entrants from 19 different countries, cementing the Isle of Man TT as a significant international motorcycle racing event. This was further proved by the 1931 event, in which 153 machines of 22 different makes entered, including eight foreign factory teams. Jimmy Simpson again raised the bar in the 1931 Senior TT and set the first 80 mile per hour lap record. Despite being the first rider to set 60, 70, and 80 mile per hour laps, Jimmy Simpson had still not won a TT by 1931. In the face of mounting international factory competition, British built bikes remained the most competitive over the first half of the 1930’s. The two most dominant British makes at the time were Norton and Rudge and their battles to be the fastest at the TT bred significant innovations in their race bikes such as overhead camshafts and multi-valve heads. The British dominance would come to an end in 1935 when experienced rider Standley Woods switched to Moto Guzzi motorcycles. He went on to win both the Senior and the Lightweight races, setting a new course record in the process.

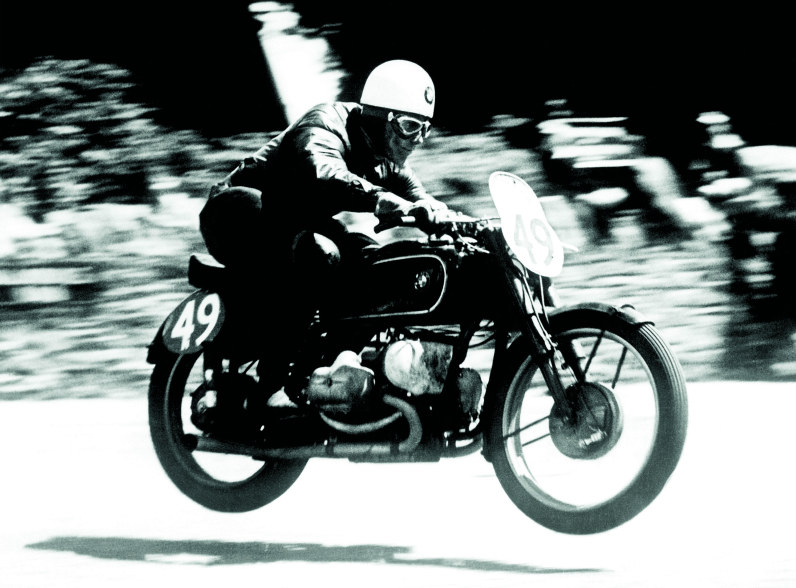
Georg Meier riding his supercharged BMW in the 1939 TT

To remain competitive, British manufacturers such as Norton and Velocette, chose to focus on the handling of their single cylinder motorcycles. With more advanced suspension systems front and rear, the singles remained in the fight and in 1938, Harold Daniell riding a Norton, set the first ever average race speed above 90 miles per hour. This record of 91 mph over seven laps of the Mountain course would stand for 12 years until being broken after World War II. The 1938 TT was also the first to have a German made motorcycle win a race, with a two-stroke DKW winning the Lightweight TT. The German manufacturers returned in force for the 1939 race with BMW, NSU and DKW fielding factory machines. The supercharged BMW twin would go on to win the Senior TT, ridden by Georg Meier. The 1939 TT was the last to be held before the outbreak of World War II.

The Isle of Man TT returned for the first time after World War II in 1947. Based on the performance of the BMWs in the 1939 Senior TT, superchargers were banned from the race. Introduced was a new Clubman’s set of classes which allowed essentially standard road going motorcycles to compete, so long as they were fitted with lights and a kick starter. The Clubman's classes mirrored the existing classes, with a Clubman's Lightweight, Clubman's Junior, and Clubman's Senior class all competing in their own races. The riders were little-known, but as the stars were barred from entering the class, it provided a stepping-stone for future-stars. Like the early Lightweight TT races, the Clubman's races were "mass start" events. The Senior TT remained the ultimate race of the weekend and Harold Daniel, riding a Norton, went on to repeat his success of 1938 taking first place. Due to the much lower quality of petrol after the war, his fastest lap was only 84.07 mph, significantly slower than nine years prior. By the 1948 running, the TT had firmly recovered from the post war slump with over 100 entrants across the four classes.

=== Grand Prix World Championship (1949–1976) ===
The Isle of Man TT became part of the FIM Motor-cycle Grand Prix World Championship (now MotoGP) as the British round of the World Motor-Cycling Championship during the period 1949–1976. During this period of the Isle of Man TT races, the Sidecar TT, 50 cc Ultra-Lightweight TT, 125 cc Lightweight TT, 250 cc Lightweight TT, 350 cc Junior TT and 500 cc Senior TT races counted towards the FIM Motor-Cycle Grand Prix World Championship.

The Clubman races with Lightweight, Junior and Senior classes were held for production motorcycles from 1947 until 1956. A Senior 1000 cc class provided an opportunity for Vincent motorcycles. The series became dominated by one model – the BSA Gold Star, and with little competition from other manufacturers, was discontinued. When previewing the impending re-introduction of a specification-controlled, roadster-based class in March 1967, David Dixon wrote: "lack of inter-make rivalry probably put the final nail in the coffin".

Writing in UK monthly magazine Motor Cyclist Illustrated, racing journalist Ray Knight, who had achieved a lap speed of nearly 88 mph on a Triumph Tiger 100 roadster-based racing motorcycle in the Manx Grand Prix, commented in early 1965 that the ACU had refused a request from manufacturers to run a production TT race, which he thought was a missed opportunity, particularly considering the dwindling support for the 500 cc race.

Beryl Swain became the first woman to compete in a TT race for solo motorcycles when she competed in the Isle of Man TT in 1962. There was subsequently a ban on women in the race from 1962 until Hilary Musson competed in 1978.

Following safety concerns with the Snaefell Mountain Course and problems over inadequate "start-money" for competitors, there was a boycott of the Isle of Man TT races from the early 1970s by many of the leading competitors, motorcycle manufacturers and national motorcycle sporting federations. After the 1972 races, multiple world champion, 10-time TT race winner and dominant motorcycle racer of his time Giacomo Agostini announced he would never race again at the Isle of Man, declaring it too dangerous for international competition and that it was outrageous that such a race should ever be part of a scenario professional riders were forced into; at this point the Isle of Man TT was not suited to the growing professionalism and business aspects of Grand Prix motorcycle racing. More and more riders joined his boycott, and after 1976, the Isle of Man TT lost its world championship status; this was transferred to the United Kingdom by the FIM and run as the British Grand Prix for the 1977 season.

=== Formula TT (1977–1990) ===
The Isle of Man TT Races then became an integral part of the new style TT Formula 1, Formula 2, and Formula 3 World Championships between 1977 and 1990 to develop and maintain the international racing status of the Isle of Man TT races.

=== Modern era (1991–present) ===
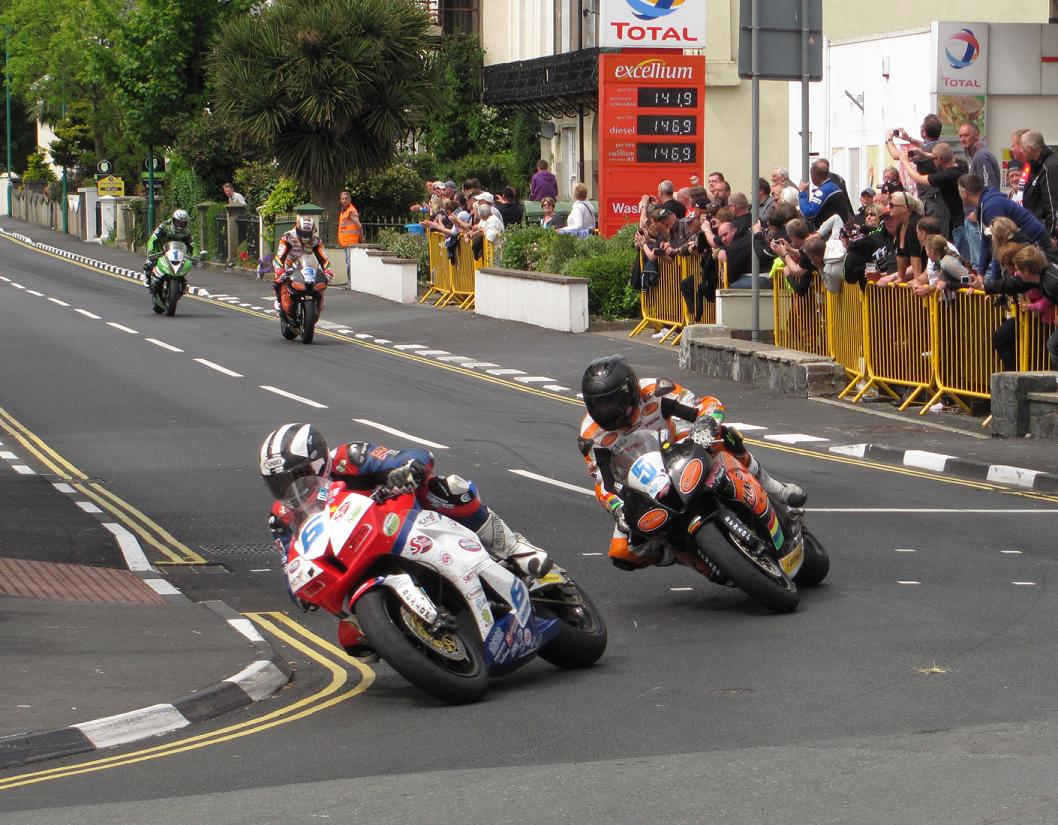
Michael Dunlop in front of Bruce Anstey during the 2013 Supersport TT

The event was redeveloped by the Isle of Man Department of Tourism as the Isle of Man TT Festival from 1989 onwards. This included new racing events for the new Isle of Man TT Festival programme, including the Pre-TT Classic Races in 1989 followed by the Post-TT Races from 1991, both held on the Billown Circuit. In 2013, the Isle of Man Classic TT was developed by the Isle of Man Department of Economic Development and the Auto-Cycle Union for historic racing motorcycles, and along with the Manx Grand Prix, it formed part of the 'Isle of Man Festival of Motorcycling' held in late August of each year. The Classic TT brand ceased operation prior to the 2022 event, with classes for historic racing motorcycles integrated into the Manx Grand Prix. The TT is now promoted by the Isle of Man Government Department for Enterprise.

The 2001 Isle of Man TT races were cancelled because of the outbreak of foot-and-mouth disease in the UK in the spring and summer of 2001. Disinfecting 40,000 spectators and competitors (and their motorcycles) to ensure the disease was kept off the island proved difficult.

There has been criticism of the event. In 2007, an incident during the Senior Race resulted in the deaths of a rider and two spectators. The resultant inquest made several recommendations and included several comments, such as: 'Senior Marshals may well have been elevated beyond the sphere of their competence'. The coroner also noted that "I am more than aware of the fact that the witnesses from the Manx Motor Cycle Club and the marshals are all volunteers. They give their time freely and without paid reward. Having said that however, if it were suggested because they were volunteers there should be some allowance in the standards expected of them, then I regret I cannot agree."

The TT Zero was a one lap race for electric bikes running from 2010 to 2019. It was announced that the race would take a two-year break after 2019, but it has not been on the racing schedule since.

In March 2020, the Isle of Man Government announced the cancellation of the 2020 TT due to the ongoing COVID-19 pandemic. The Classic TT was subsequently cancelled in May, and in December 2020, it was announced that 2021's TT races would also not go ahead, due to the continued worldwide spread of the virus. In 2020, the Isle of Man Government lost an estimated £4.8 million of its annual projected revenue due to the cancellation of the TT races.

The event returned in 2022 after a two-year absence.

== Event format ==
The Isle of Man TT typically begins on the Spring Bank Holiday which falls on the last Monday of May and runs for 13 days into the beginning of June. The first 5 days of the event are known as qualifying week and consist of several practice and qualifying sessions for the different classes. Races begin on the weekend after qualifying and run through the following week. There are typically one or two rest days in the middle of race week. The rest days are held as contingency days in the schedule in the case of poor weather disrupting the earlier qualifying or racing sessions.

=== Eligibility ===
To be eligible to race in the Isle of Man TT, competitors must hold a National or International race licence and have recent, relevant experience in motorcycle racing events. Newcomers to the TT are assessed on a case-by-case basis with officials looking at their track record in competitive racing. Entrants must be able to demonstrate that they have been competitive in other recognised road race events, by having scored points or placing within the top six finishers. A common stepping stone into the Isle of Man TT is the Manx Grand Prix, which is an amateur version of the TT held in the late summer.

Entrants are accepted in an order of priority based on the rider's finishing position in the previous year's TT, and then the rider's fastest lap speed in any previous TT. Up to 15 newcomers are allowed per race. For the Superbike and Superstock classes, entries are limited to a maximum of 72 starters. The Supersport, Supertwin, and Sidecar classes are limited to a maximum of 78 starters. One driving factor to the limit on the number of starters is the start procedure which spaces out each competitor by 10 seconds. With 78 starters, it takes 13 minutes for every competitor to have set off. With a single lap taking around 17 minutes to complete, that leaves only 4 minutes for the start gate and personnel to leave the start/finish line before the first riders return.

=== Qualifying ===
There are several qualifying sessions throughout the first week of the Isle of Man TT. The qualifying sessions group several classes together, with Superbike, Superstock and Supersport commonly all running in the same session. The Sidecar class always runs in its own dedicated session. Newcomers are given priority during qualifying, and are allowed to participate in the majority of sessions regardless of their class. This is to ensure that newcomers can gain as much exposure to the track prior to the races.

To qualify for a race, an entrant's qualifying time must be within a certain percentage of the time set by the third fastest qualifier in the class. For the solo races, it is within 112% of the third fastest qualifier. For the sidecar race, it is within 120% of the third fastest qualifying time. The qualifying results are based on any of the times set in any of the sessions before the close of qualifying.

=== Races ===
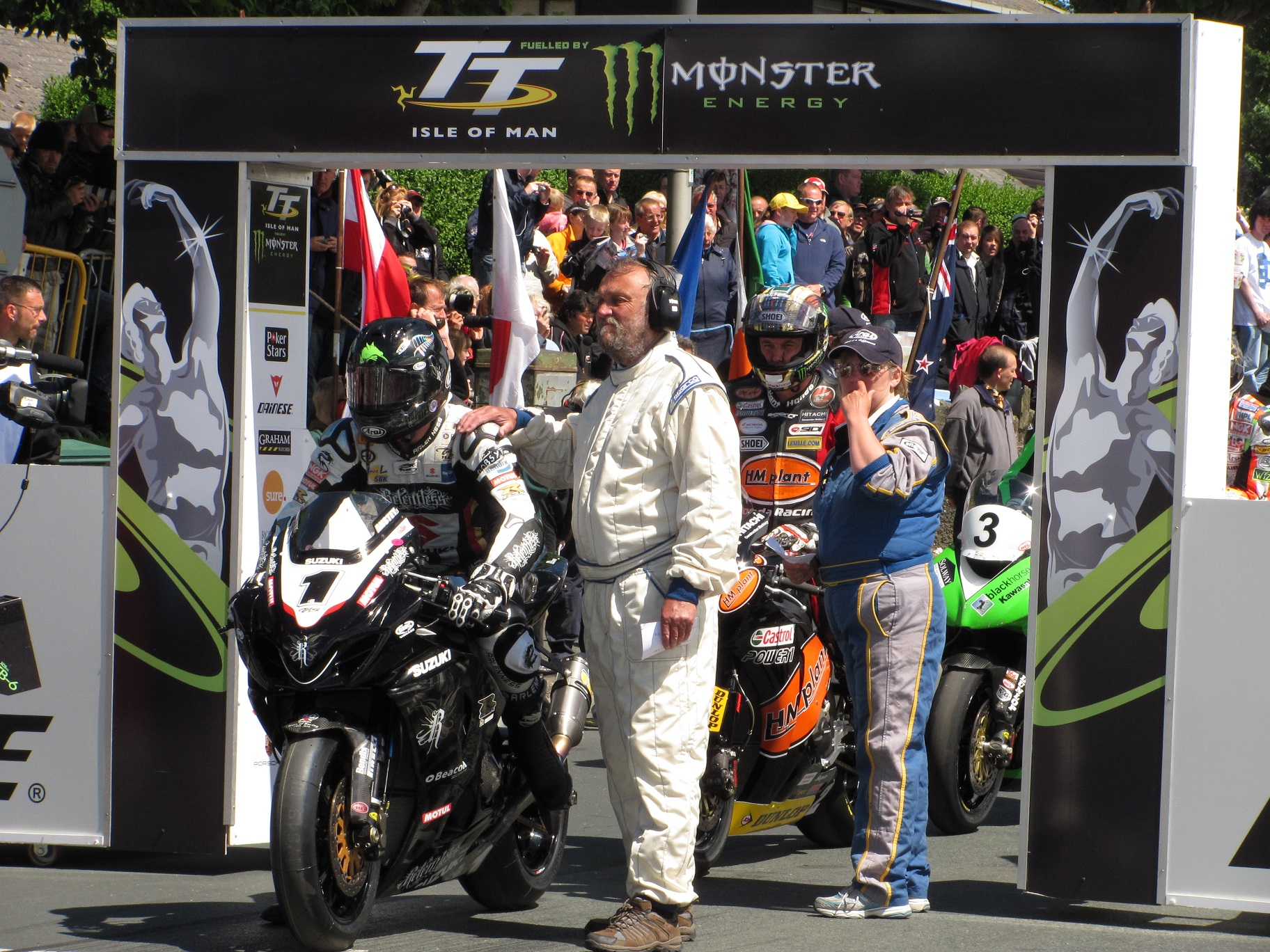
Competitors line up at the start of the 2010 Senior TT race

There are two races held per class throughout the second week of the TT. The format of the race is a time trial, where in order to win, the rider must complete the race in the least amount of time. Therefore, the track position in which the riders finish the race is irrelevant. Race competitors set off from the start line at ten second intervals, ensuring that each rider is able to focus on the track instead of passing one another. That being said, it is common for riders to encounter each other on the track as the race progresses, and riders may end up having to overtake each other during the race. The number of laps per race varies depending on the class:

Class	Number of laps	Total distance
Superbike / Senior	6	226.38 mi (364.32 km)
Supersport	4	150.09 mi (241.55 km)
Superstock	3	113.19 mi (182.16 km)
Supertwin	3	113.19 mi (182.16 km)
Sidecar	3	113.19 mi (182.16 km)

The Senior TT is typically the last race held and is considered the most important of the TT. The Senior race is unique because is it not limited to machines conforming to the Superbike class rules. Riders are permitted to change machine to any other eligible machine on which the rider has qualified to race or has raced during the meeting. It is not uncommon for riders to enter the Senior TT riding on their Superstock class machines. In some cases, the Superstock class machines can be faster than the Superbike class, despite their less extensive performance modifications. The current lap record on the Mountain Course was set by Peter Hickman during a Superstock race.

In the case of inclement weather, races may be postponed to later in the day, or later in the week. If the schedule necessitates, the number of laps per race may be reduced to fit them in the remaining schedule.

==== Pit stops ====
Most races will require a pit stop at some point to refuel. Typically, TT motorcycles can complete two laps before needing to refuel. The Superbike class machines will also have the rear tyre changed during one of their pit stops. Fuel is gravity fed to the motorcycles from elevated tanks and can take up to a minute for a full refill during a stop. In the meantime, the rider is able to clean their helmet visor, drink water, and receive information from the pit crew regarding their performance.

== Race classes ==
The racing classes that compete at the Isle of Man TT are broadly similar to the standard FIM race classes with additional TT-specific regulations.

=== Superbike TT (2005–present) ===
The superbike class represents the highest performance motorcycles that compete at the Isle of Man TT. These machines must appear on the FIM homologated motorcycles list. Commonly these machines are 1,000 cc four-cylinder sport bikes that have been heavily modified for racing purposes. General specifications are as follows:

# of cylinders	Engine displacement	Typical power	Minimum weight
3–4	750 – 1,000 cc	250 hp	165 kg (364 lbs)
2	850 – 1,200 cc	250 hp	165 kg (364 lbs)

Other machines may be admitted at the discretion of the organisers.

=== Supersport TT (2005–present) ===
The supersport class can be considered the modern incarnation of the Junior TT class. Supersport motorcycles are more limited in the amount and types of modifications they can make. Specifications are based on the FIM Supersport Championship.

# of cylinders	Engine displacement	Typical power	Minimum weight
4	400 – 600 cc	130 hp	161 kg (355 lbs)
3	600 – 890 cc	130 hp	161 kg (355 lbs)
2	600 – 955 cc	130 hp	161 kg (355 lbs)

=== Superstock TT (2005–present) ===
Superstock TT utilizes machines similar to the Superbike class, but severely limits modification. Motorcycles in this class compete on treaded road tyres. Specifications are based on the FIM Superstock Championship.

# of cylinders	Engine displacement	Typical power	Minimum weight
3–4	750 – 1,000 cc	220 hp	170 kg (375 lbs)
2	850 – 1,200 cc	220 hp	170 kg (375 lbs)

=== Supertwin TT (2022–present) ===
2022 saw the introduction of the supertwin race run over 3 laps, increased to 4 laps the following year. The class is very similar to the lightweight class which last ran in 2019, although with some differences. The maximum capacity has been increased to 700 cc allowing the Yamaha YZF-R7 and Aprilia RS660 to compete. In 2022 bikes with capacities of 651 cc+ were required to run 10 kg heavier than the 150 kg minimum for the 650 cc machines, but 2023 saw this changed and all bikes in the class now have a minimum weight of 150 kg.

# of cylinders	Engine displacement	Typical power	Minimum weight
2	600 – 700 cc	105 hp	150 kg (331 lbs)

=== Sidecar TT ===
The 1923 TT was the first time the Sidecar TT race was run, over three laps (113 mi or 182 km) of the Mountain Course and was won by Freddie Dixon and passenger Walter Denny with a Douglas and special banking-sidecar at an average race speed of 53.15 mph (85.54 km/h). For the 1926 event the Sidecar and Ultra-Lightweight TT classes were dropped due to lack of entries.

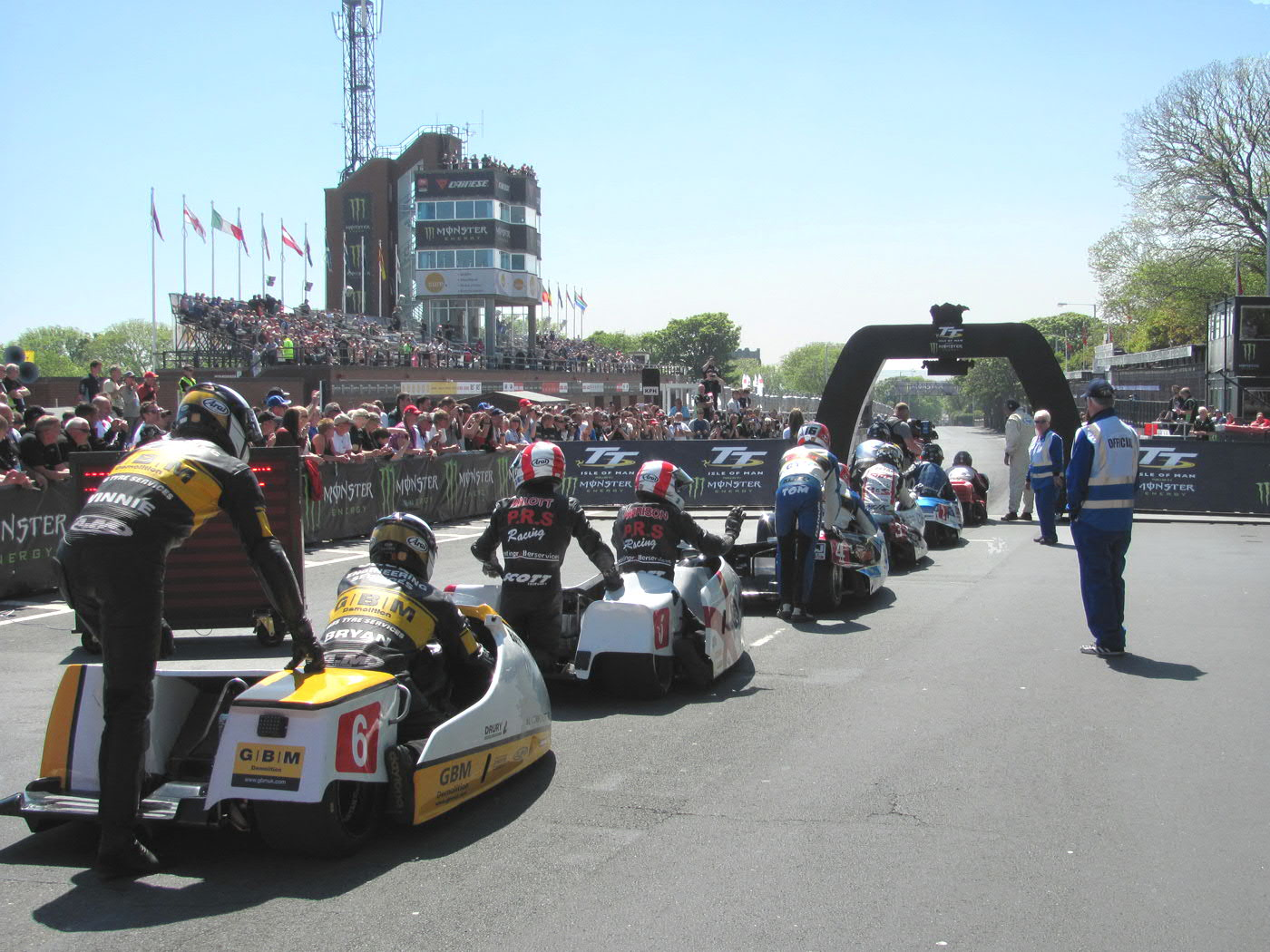
Sidecar TT race competitors line up to start the race

The Sidecar race was re-introduced from the 1954 event for Sidecars not exceeding 500 cc engine capacity, run on the Clypse Course. A non-championship 750 cc class for sidecars was introduced at the 1968 event. For the 1976 event the race was held over two-legs. From 1975, the previous 500 cc and 750 cc classes for Sidecars were replaced by a 1,000 cc engine capacity class. The new FIM Formula 2 class for Sidecars was introduced for the 1990 Isle of Man TT.

- 1954–1959: FIM World Championship Event for Side-Cars not exceeding 500 cc engine capacity. Race held on the Clypse Course.
- 1960–1976: FIM World Championship Event held on Mountain Course.
- 1968–1974: Non-Championship event for Sidecars not exceeding 750 cc.
- 1975–1989: Sidecars not exceeding 1,000 cc engine capacity.
- 1990–present: FIM Formula 2 Sidecar race for two-stroke engines not exceeding 350 cc or four-stroke engines not exceeding 600 cc.

==== Current specifications ====
Machines must comply with general technical rules as per ACU Standing Regulations and 2015 Isle of Man TT regulations.

- 501–600 cc, 4 stroke, 4 cylinder, production based motorcycle engines.

== TT course ==
Map of the TT Mountain Course Route

The modern Isle of Man TT Mountain Course is a 37.73-mile (60.72 km) circuit made up of public urban and rural roads. The course starts in Douglas, heads west through the lower countryside of the central valley towards Peel, then turns north following the base of the mountains towards Ramsey, and returns to Douglas via the Snaefell Mountain road. The circuit features a total of 219 turns and total elevation change of 421 metres (1,381 ft). Passing though many smaller villages and countryside, the course navigates through a combination of narrow urban and winding rural mountain roads. This leads to the more dangerous nature of the course with riders faced with many obstacles, such as high curbs, stone walls adjacent to the road, and limited to no runoff space.

The course is closed to the public in the morning before the racing session begins, and is reopened in the evening when the racing has concluded for the day. More than 600 volunteer marshals are tasked with closing, clearing, and preparing the 37.73-mile (60.72 km) course for road racing. Travelling marshals use a combination of automobiles and motorcycles to survey the course prior to the start of racing activities. Once closed, the course can only be crossed at a few pedestrian bridges and tunnels. It is a popular activity for fans and motorcycle enthusiasts to ride the course for themselves after the racing has concluded for the day and the course has been reopened to the public.

=== Travelling marshals ===
Originally introduced in 1935, travelling marshals are positioned around the course to provide a rapid response to any incidents. Selected marshals have previous race experience and are first-aid trained, with machines carrying medical equipment that can assist in managing injuries after an accident. They also have other duties such as course inspection, observation of machines on the course for visible faults, and review and reporting on any course incidents. Until 2024, all travelling marshals rode Honda CBR1000RR Fireblades. In 2025, BMW Motorrad announced a 3-year deal with the Isle of Man TT to supply a mixture of S1000RR and M1000RR machinery for the marshals to ride. After the completion of a practice or race period, all travelling marshals set off in the course direction, with the travelling marshal setting off from the Grandstand wearing a red tabard over his yellow jacket, known as the Last Travelling Marshal (LTM), to clear down the course. Shortly after the LTM sets off, an official course car displaying the notice "Roads Open" sets off from St Ninian's Crossroads a short distance from the Grandstand and proceeds around the Mountain Course at race speed; once the car passes a given point along the course, the road, including side-access junctions, is opened to public use. This means the section of the course around the Grandstand is the last to be reopened. On the Snaefell mountain road section from Ramsey to Douglas, the official vehicle displays the notice Roads Open One Way.

=== Course crossings ===
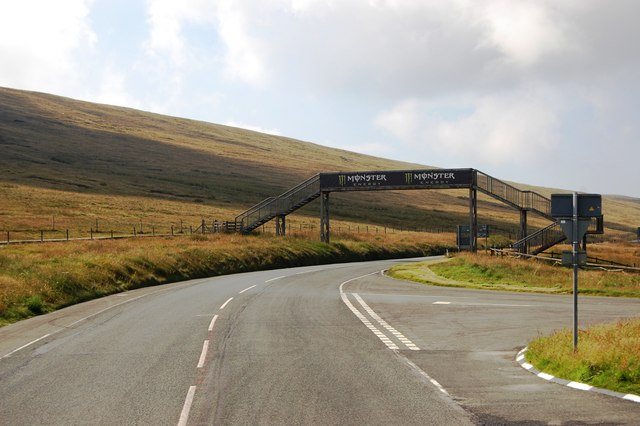
Pedestrian bridge at The Bungalow, on Snaefell mountain

The 1982 Road Racing Act (Isle of Man) and the supplementary TT Road Races Orders allow vehicles and pedestrians to cross the Snaefell Mountain Course at certain points between scheduled race periods under the supervision of a police officer. Several permanent pedestrian bridges have been erected to permit movement of people during race periods. These points are generally located in the more populous region of the island, and at popular spots for spectating. One connects two parts of Douglas at St Ninian's Crossroads shortly after the Grandstand. One footbridge connects parts of Ramsey on the approach to Parliament Square while another links other parts of Ramsey near the town's bus station. Another footbridge crosses the course at the Bungalow near the highest point of the course while the fifth connects suburban Onchan and Douglas just after Signpost Corner.

==== TT Access Road ====
The TT Access Road runs parallel to a section of the A1 Peel Road, which is part of the Snaefell Mountain Course, and operates during practice and race periods to enable vehicles to pass from inside of the race course to the outside. It runs along a section of former railway line on the historic Douglas to Peel route, from the junction of the A5 New Castletown Road at the Quarter Bridge, passing under the course at Braddan Bridge, to an exit at Braddan School Road in Douglas outskirts, near the former Braddan Railway Halt and the A23/Ballafletcher Road junction. When used for vehicular traffic, pedestrian access is prohibited, but at other times it is part of a system of nature trails.

== Incidents and controversies ==
Between 1907 and 2023, there have been 156 fatalities during official practices or races on the Snaefell Mountain Course, and 269 total fatalities (this number includes the riders killed during the Manx Grand Prix, and Clubman TT race series of the late 1940s/1950s). In 2016, 5 riders died on the course during official practices or races. There were six fatalities among competitors in the 1970 and 2022 editions of the Isle of Man TT, making them the two deadliest years in the history of the event.

=== 2018 Course Car incident ===
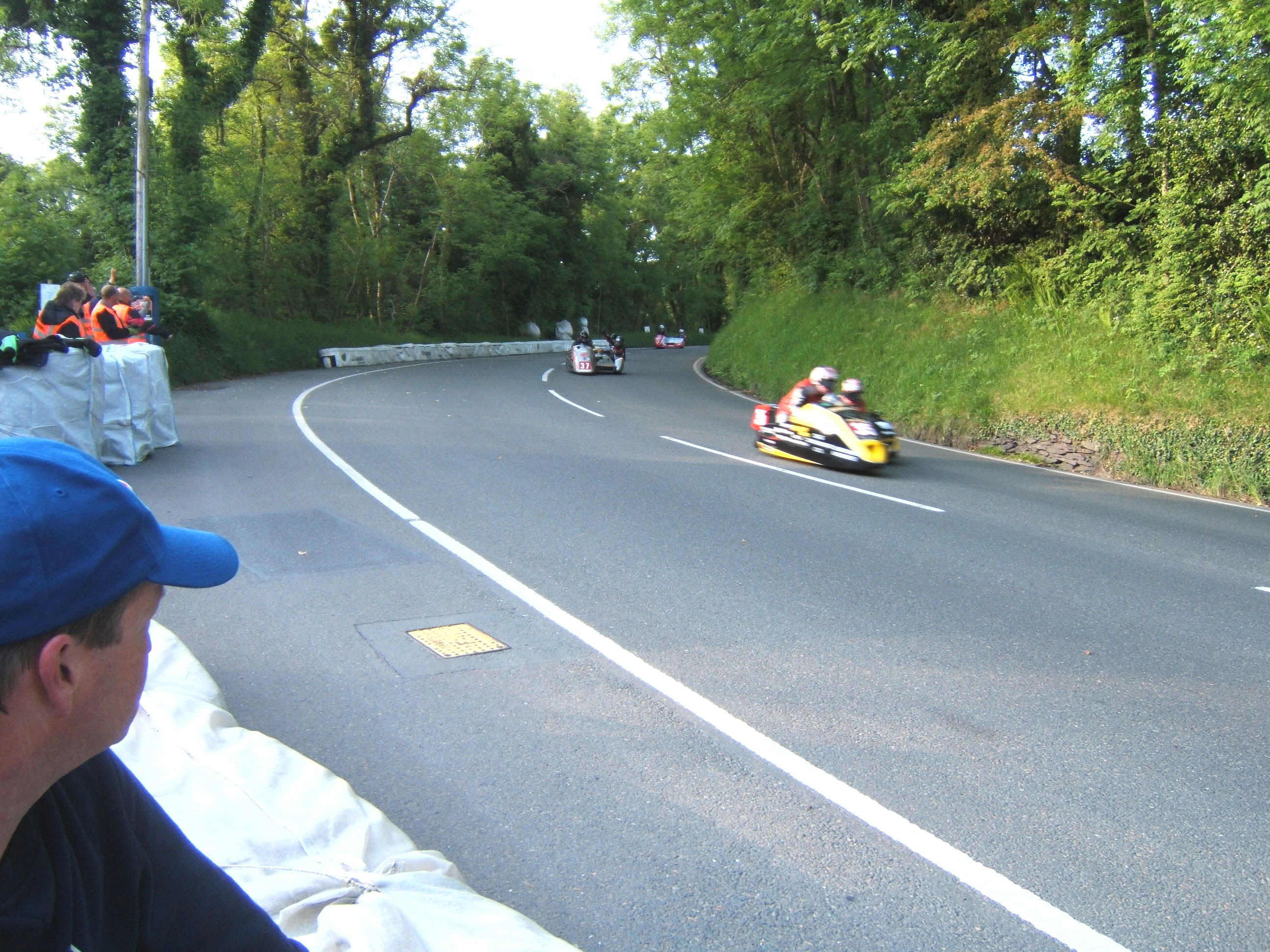
Sidecars returning to Paddock past Sarah's Cottage in reverse direction to a normal race after a red flag caused by a competitor's crash in 2009

On 30 May 2018, experienced TT rider Steve Mercer was seriously injured in a head-on collision with an official Course Car at Ballacrye. The vehicle, which was travelling at high speed, was transporting police officers to the scene of a fatal accident involving Dan Kneen. Mercer was unconscious for five days and spent five months in hospital with multiple injuries. He was among seven riders who had been stopped on the course and instructed by marshals to return to the TT Grandstand area in the reverse direction following the red flag stoppage. Immediately after the collision, the organisers amended their procedures so that returning riders would be escorted by motorcycle‑mounted travelling marshals at the front and rear. ACU Events, the event organisers, arranged an independent inquiry into the circumstances.

The Auto-Cycle Union, the Isle of Man Department for Enterprise, and the inquiry report author, lawyer Rob Jones, a former chief executive of the Motor Sports Association, all declined to release the report, stating that it was confidential and privately owned by the ACU.

The ACU accepted liability for the collision but required that any compensation claim by Mercer be filed in the Isle of Man. It stated that Mercer was receiving financial support through "extensive insurance arrangements".

In 2019, it was reported that the driver of the Course Car had resigned after criticism that he exceeded a newly introduced speed limit recorded by a GPS tracking device when travelling to attend a fatality involving Chris Swallow at Ballaugh during August's Senior Classic TT. Gary Thompson, Clerk of the Course and an ACU employee, had been criticised in 2018 for also holding the role of Safety Officer; a new appointee was in place for 2019.

=== 2026 Parliament Square incident ===
On 25 May 2026, eight spectators were taken to hospital after a rider crashed into people at the exit of Parliament Square in Ramsey during a practice session on the opening day. The session was red‑flagged and serious‑incident procedures were activated. The spectators were conscious when taken to Noble's Hospital, while the unnamed rider, who suffered leg injuries, was also described as "conscious and talking". An investigation was launched under standard procedures, and the rest of the day's schedule was cancelled.

The following day, it was reported that two of the injured spectators had been transferred to the United Kingdom for specialist medical treatment. Organisers added that the remaining six spectators, together with the rider, had been discharged from hospital. They also confirmed that the viewing area at Albert Square, located beyond the exit from Parliament Square, would remain closed to spectators for the rest of the 2026 event as a precaution.

=== 2026 suspension of the Sidecar class ===
On 28 May 2026, organisers announced that the Sidecar class had been suspended for the remainder of the TT following crashes during qualifying. They said that, after an incident in the third qualifying session, the Race Organisation had launched an "immediate technical and operational review", after which the class was suspended as a "precautionary measure".

== Champions and records ==
=== Total overall race winners ===
Updated in June 2026

Po.	Rider	Wins
1	(Northern Ireland) Michael Dunlop	36
2	(Northern Ireland) Joey Dunlop	26
3	(England) John McGuinness	23
4	(Isle of Man) Dave Molyneux	17
5	(England) Ian Hutchinson	16
6	(England) Mike Hailwood, (England) Ben Birchall, (England) Tom Birchall, (England) Peter Hickman	14
10	(New Zealand) Bruce Anstey	12
11	(Scotland) Steve Hislop, (Northern Ireland) Phillip McCallen	11
13	(Italy) Giacomo Agostini, (England) Robert Fisher, (Republic of Ireland) Stanley Woods	10
16	(England) Mick Boddice, (England) David Jefferies, (Wales) Ian Lougher, (Note: Erroneously listed as having 12 wins on the official TT database) (Germany) Siegfried Schauzu	9
20	Rick Long, Jim Moodie, Chas Mortimer, Phil Read, Dan Sayle, Charlie Williams	8
26	Mick Grant, Dean Harrison, Wolfgang Kalauch, Michael Rutter, Tony Rutter	7
30	Chas Birks, Geoff Duke, Jimmie Guthrie, Jim Redman, John Surtees	6
35	Alec Bennett, Nick Crowe, Robert Dunlop, Brian Reid, Carlo Ubbiali	5
40	Callum Crowe, Ryan Crowe, Klaus Enders, Freddie Frith, Wal Handley, Trevor Ireson, Benga Johansson, Dave Leach, Ray Pickrell, Tarquinio Provini, Horst Schneider, Barry Smith, Bill Smith, Jock Taylor, John Williams,	4
53	Ray Amm, Adrian Archibald, Graeme Crosby, Harold Daniell, Max Deubel, Ralf Engelhardt, Ryan Farquhar, Patrick Farrance, Carl Fogarty, Alex George, Tom Herron, Darren Hope, Emil Hörner, Alan Jackson, Tony Jefferies, Geoff Johnson, Klaus Klaffenböck, Rob McElnea, Bob McIntyre, Phil Mellor, Dave Morris, Chris Palmer, (Note: Erroneously listed as having 4 wins on the official TT database) Clive Pollington, Walter Schneider, Ian Simpson, Rolf Steinhausen, Hans Strauss, Luigi Taveri, Davey Todd, Barry Woodland	3
83	Fergus Anderson, Hugh Anderson, Manliff Barrington, Artie Bell, Geoff Bell, Lowry Burton, Kel Carruthers, Bernard Codd, Charlie Collier, Keith Cornbill, Mark Cox, Steve Cull, Pat Cushnahan, Howard R Davies, Freddie Dixon, Charlie Dodson, Cameron Donald, Iain Duffus, Karl Ellison, Bob Foster, Dick Greasley, Manfred Grunwald, Hermann Hahn, Craig Hallam, Shaun Harris, John Hartle, Pete Hill, Fritz Hillebrand, Mac Hobson, Gary Hocking, John Holden, Josef Huber, Tim Hunt, Boyd Hutchinson, Bill Ivy, Gary Johnson, Alistair King, Con Law, Eddie Laycock, Ivan Lintin, Bill Lomas, Graeme McGregor, Trevor Nation, Gary Padgett, Steve Plater, Jock Porter, Nick Roche, Cecil Sandford, Dave Saville, Tom Sheard, Edwin Twemlow, Malcolm Uphill, Dave Wells, Don Williams, Eric Williams, Paul Williams, Andrew Winkle, Michael Wynn	2
141	Steve Abbott, Dario Ambrosini, Frank A Applebee, Ivor Arber, Reg Armstrong, Kenny Arthur, Stewart Atkinson, Georg Auerbacher, Mike Aylott, Mark Baldwin, Rob Barber, W. Harry Bashall, Ian Bell, Phillip Biggs, Eric Bliss, Dieter Braun, Eric Briggs, Norman Brown, Ralph Bryans, Jimmy Buchan, Trevor Burgess, Roger Burnett, Mick Burns, Florian Camathias, Maurice Cann, Neil Carpenter, Phil Carpenter, Phil Carter, Harold Clark, Rod Coleman, Harry A Collier, Stuart Collins, Syd Crabtree, Dave Croxford, Jack Daniels, Leo Davenport, Geoff Davison, Tommy de la Hay, Ernst Degner, Walter Denny, George Douglass, Eddie Dow, Percy Evans, Helmut Fath, Jack Findlay, John Flaxman, Frank Fletcher, Rem Fowler, John Giabbard, Sid Gleave, Oliver Godfrey, Les Graham, Stuart Graham, Werner Haas, Dave Hallam, Roy Hanks, Colin Hardman, Bernard Hargreaves, Conrad Harrison, Ron Haslam, Ronnie Hazlehurst, Chris Heath, Alfred Herzig, Freddie Hicks, James Hillier, Robert Holden, Rupert Hollaus, K.J. Horstman, Clive Horton, Eric Houseley, Dennis Ireland, Mitsuo Itoh, Brian Jackson, Nick Jefferies, Doug Jewell, Lee Johnston, Paddy Johnston, Ken Kavanagh, Bob Keeler, Neil Kelly, John Kidson, Ewald Kluge, Ray Knight, David Lashmar, Monty V. Lockwood, Frank Longman, Heinz Luthringshauser, Jack Marshall, Tom Kearey, Keith Martin, Hugh Mason, Cromie McCandless, Georg Meier, Ted Mellors, Mark Miller, Derek Minter, Brian Morrison, Les Nutt, George O'Dell, Eric Oliver, Mat Oxley, Phil Palmer, Len Parker, Denis Parkinson, Graham Penny, Alex Phillip, Derek Powell, Cyril Pullin, Brian Purslow, Richard Quayle, Johnny Rea, Harry Reed, Tim Reeves, Brett Richmond, Tommy Robb, John Robinson, Mike Rogers, Nigel Rollason, Dave Roper, Gordon Russell, Fritz Scheidegger, Martyn Sharpe, Dave Simmonds, Bill Simpson, Jimmie Simpson, Shaun Smith, Cyril Taft, Omobono Tenni, Steve Tonkin, George Tucker, Kenneth Twemlow, Henry Tyrell-Smith, Chris Vincent, Terry Vinicombe, Graham Walker, Frank Whiteway, Cyril Williams, Donny Williams, Paul J. Williams, Peter Williams, Alfred Wohlgemuth, Tim Wood, Tommy Wood, Stan Woods	1

=== FIM Motorcycle Grand Prix World Championship rounds (1949–1976) ===
==== Multiple winners (riders) ====
# Wins	Rider	Wins	
# Wins	Rider	Category	Years won
12	(United Kingdom) Mike Hailwood	500cc	1961, 1963, 1964, 1965, 1966, 1967
12	(United Kingdom) Mike Hailwood	350cc	1962, 1967
12	(United Kingdom) Mike Hailwood	250cc	1961, 1966, 1967
12	(United Kingdom) Mike Hailwood	125cc	1961
10	(Italy) Giacomo Agostini	500cc	1968, 1969, 1970, 1971, 1972
10	(Italy) Giacomo Agostini	350cc	1966, 1968, 1969, 1970, 1972
6	(United Kingdom) John Surtees	500cc	1956, 1958, 1959, 1960
6	(United Kingdom) John Surtees	350cc	1958, 1959
6	(Rhodesia) Jim Redman	350cc	1963, 1964, 1965
6	(Rhodesia) Jim Redman	250cc	1963, 1964, 1965
6	(United Kingdom) Phil Read	350cc	1961
6	(United Kingdom) Phil Read	250cc	1971, 1972
6	(United Kingdom) Phil Read	125cc	1965, 1967, 1968
5	(United Kingdom) Geoff Duke	500cc	1950, 1951, 1955
5	(United Kingdom) Geoff Duke	350cc	1951, 1952
5	(Italy) Carlo Ubbiali	250cc	1956
5	(Italy) Carlo Ubbiali	125cc	1955, 1956, 1958, 1960
4	(Italy) Tarquinio Provini	250cc	1958, 1959
4	(Italy) Tarquinio Provini	125cc	1957, 1959
4	(United Kingdom) Chas Mortimer	350cc	1976
4	(United Kingdom) Chas Mortimer	250cc	1975
4	(United Kingdom) Chas Mortimer	125cc	1971, 1972
3	(Federation of Rhodesia and Nyasaland) Ray Amm	500cc	1953, 1954
3	(Federation of Rhodesia and Nyasaland) Ray Amm	350cc	1953
3	(Switzerland) Luigi Taveri	125cc	1962, 1964
3	(Switzerland) Luigi Taveri	50cc	1965
3	(United Kingdom) Charlie Williams	350cc	1975
3	(United Kingdom) Charlie Williams	250cc	1973, 1974
2	(United Kingdom) Fergus Anderson	250cc	1952, 1953
2	(United Kingdom) Bill Lomas	350cc	1955
2	(United Kingdom) Bill Lomas	250cc	1955
2	(United Kingdom) Cecil Sandford	250cc	1957
2	(United Kingdom) Cecil Sandford	125cc	1952
2	(United Kingdom) Bob McIntyre	500cc	1957
2	(United Kingdom) Bob McIntyre	350cc	1957
2	(Federation of Rhodesia and Nyasaland) Gary Hocking	500cc	1962
2	(Federation of Rhodesia and Nyasaland) Gary Hocking	250cc	1960
2	(New Zealand) Hugh Anderson	125cc	1963
2	(New Zealand) Hugh Anderson	50cc	1964
2	(United Kingdom) Bill Ivy	250cc	1968
2	(United Kingdom) Bill Ivy	125cc	1966
2	(Australia) Kel Carruthers	250cc	1969, 1970
2	(United Kingdom) Tony Rutter	350cc	1973, 1974
2	(United Kingdom) Tom Herron	500cc	1976
2	(United Kingdom) Tom Herron	250cc	1976

==== Multiple winners (manufacturers) ====
# Wins	Manufacturer	Wins	
# Wins	Manufacturer	Category	Years won
33	(Italy) MV Agusta	500cc	1956, 1958, 1959, 1960, 1962, 1963, 1964, 1965, 1968, 1969, 1970, 1971, 1972
33	(Italy) MV Agusta	350cc	1958, 1959, 1960, 1962, 1966, 1968, 1969, 1970, 1972
33	(Italy) MV Agusta	250cc	1956, 1958, 1959, 1960
33	(Italy) MV Agusta	125cc	1952, 1953, 1955, 1956, 1958, 1959, 1960
21	(Japan) Yamaha	500cc	1974, 1976
21	(Japan) Yamaha	350cc	1973, 1974, 1975, 1976
21	(Japan) Yamaha	250cc	1968, 1970, 1971, 1972, 1973, 1974, 1975, 1976
21	(Japan) Yamaha	125cc	1965, 1966, 1967, 1968, 1971, 1972, 1973
18	(Japan) Honda	500cc	1966, 1967
18	(Japan) Honda	350cc	1963, 1964, 1965, 1967
18	(Japan) Honda	250cc	1961, 1962, 1963, 1964, 1965, 1966, 1967
18	(Japan) Honda	125cc	1961, 1962, 1964
18	(Japan) Honda	50cc	1965, 1966
12	(United Kingdom) Norton	500cc	1949, 1950, 1951, 1952, 1953, 1954, 1961
12	(United Kingdom) Norton	350cc	1950, 1951, 1952, 1953, 1961
7	(Italy) Moto Guzzi	350cc	1955, 1956
7	(Italy) Moto Guzzi	250cc	1949, 1951, 1952, 1953, 1955
7	(Japan) Suzuki	500cc	1973
7	(Japan) Suzuki	125cc	1963, 1970
7	(Japan) Suzuki	50cc	1962, 1963, 1964, 1967
3	(Italy) Mondial	250cc	1957
3	(Italy) Mondial	125cc	1951, 1957
3	(Italy) Gilera	500cc	1955, 1957
3	(Italy) Gilera	350cc	1957
2	(West Germany) NSU	250cc	1954
2	(West Germany) NSU	125cc	1954
2	(Italy) Benelli	250cc	1950, 1969
2	(Japan) Kawasaki	500cc	1975
2	(Japan) Kawasaki	125cc	1969

==== By year ====
Year	50 cc (Ultra-Lightweight TT)		125 cc (Lightweight TT)		250 cc (Lightweight TT)		350 cc (Junior TT)		500 cc (Senior TT)		Report
Year	Rider	Manufacturer	Rider	Manufacturer	Rider	Manufacturer	Rider	Manufacturer	Rider	Manufacturer	Report
1976					(United Kingdom) Tom Herron	Yamaha	(United Kingdom) Chas Mortimer	Yamaha	(United Kingdom) Tom Herron	Yamaha	Report
1975					(United Kingdom) Chas Mortimer	Yamaha	(United Kingdom) Charlie Williams	Yamaha	(United Kingdom) Mick Grant	Kawasaki	Report
1974					(United Kingdom) Charlie Williams	Yamaha	(United Kingdom) Tony Rutter	Yamaha	(United Kingdom) Phil Carpenter	Yamaha	Report
1973			(United Kingdom) Tommy Robb	Yamaha	(United Kingdom) Charlie Williams	Yamaha	(United Kingdom) Tony Rutter	Yamaha	(Australia) Jack Findlay	Suzuki	Report
1972			(United Kingdom) Chas Mortimer	Yamaha	(United Kingdom) Phil Read	Yamaha	(Italy) Giacomo Agostini	MV Agusta	(Italy) Giacomo Agostini	MV Agusta	Report
1971			(United Kingdom) Chas Mortimer	Yamaha	(United Kingdom) Phil Read	Yamaha	(United Kingdom) Tony Jefferies	Yamsel	(Italy) Giacomo Agostini	MV Agusta	Report
1970			(West Germany) Dieter Braun	Suzuki	(Australia) Kel Carruthers	Yamaha	(Italy) Giacomo Agostini	MV Agusta	(Italy) Giacomo Agostini	MV Agusta	Report
1969			(United Kingdom) Dave Simmonds	Kawasaki	(Australia) Kel Carruthers	Benelli	(Italy) Giacomo Agostini	MV Agusta	(Italy) Giacomo Agostini	MV Agusta	Report
1968	(Australia) Barry Smith	Derbi	(United Kingdom) Phil Read	Yamaha	(United Kingdom) Bill Ivy	Yamaha	(Italy) Giacomo Agostini	MV Agusta	(Italy) Giacomo Agostini	MV Agusta	Report
1967	(United Kingdom) Stuart Graham	Suzuki	(United Kingdom) Phil Read	Yamaha	(United Kingdom) Mike Hailwood	Honda	(United Kingdom) Mike Hailwood	Honda	(United Kingdom) Mike Hailwood	Honda	Report
1966	(United Kingdom) Ralph Bryans	Honda	(United Kingdom) Bill Ivy	Yamaha	(United Kingdom) Mike Hailwood	Honda	(Italy) Giacomo Agostini	MV Agusta	(United Kingdom) Mike Hailwood	Honda	Report
1965	(Switzerland) Luigi Taveri	Honda	(United Kingdom) Phil Read	Yamaha	(Rhodesia) Jim Redman	Honda	(Rhodesia) Jim Redman	Honda	(United Kingdom) Mike Hailwood	MV Agusta	Report
1964	(New Zealand) Hugh Anderson	Suzuki	(Switzerland) Luigi Taveri	Honda	(Rhodesia) Jim Redman	Honda	(Rhodesia) Jim Redman	Honda	(United Kingdom) Mike Hailwood	MV Agusta	Report
1963	(Japan) Mitsuo Itoh	Suzuki	(New Zealand) Hugh Anderson	Suzuki	(Rhodesia) Jim Redman	Honda	(Rhodesia) Jim Redman	Honda	(United Kingdom) Mike Hailwood	MV Agusta	Report
1962	(West Germany) Ernst Degner	Suzuki	(Switzerland) Luigi Taveri	Honda	(United Kingdom) Derek Minter	Honda	(United Kingdom) Mike Hailwood	MV Agusta	(Federation of Rhodesia and Nyasaland) Gary Hocking	MV Agusta	Report
1961			(United Kingdom) Mike Hailwood	Honda	(United Kingdom) Mike Hailwood	Honda	(United Kingdom) Phil Read	Norton	(United Kingdom) Mike Hailwood	Norton	Report
1960			(Italy) Carlo Ubbiali	MV Agusta	(Federation of Rhodesia and Nyasaland) Gary Hocking	MV Agusta	(United Kingdom) John Hartle	MV Agusta	(United Kingdom) John Surtees	MV Agusta	Report
1959			(Italy) Tarquinio Provini	MV Agusta	(Italy) Tarquinio Provini	MV Agusta	(United Kingdom) John Surtees	MV Agusta	(United Kingdom) John Surtees	MV Agusta	Report
1958			(Italy) Carlo Ubbiali	MV Agusta	(Italy) Tarquinio Provini	MV Agusta	(United Kingdom) John Surtees	MV Agusta	(United Kingdom) John Surtees	MV Agusta	Report
1957			(Italy) Tarquinio Provini	Mondial	(United Kingdom) Cecil Sandford	Mondial	(United Kingdom) Bob McIntyre	Gilera	(United Kingdom) Bob McIntyre	Gilera	Report
1956			(Italy) Carlo Ubbiali	MV Agusta	(Italy) Carlo Ubbiali	MV Agusta	(Australia) Ken Kavanagh	Moto Guzzi	(United Kingdom) John Surtees	MV Agusta	Report
1955			(Italy) Carlo Ubbiali	MV Agusta	(United Kingdom) Bill Lomas	Moto Guzzi	(United Kingdom) Bill Lomas	Moto Guzzi	(United Kingdom) Geoff Duke	Gilera	Report
1954			(Austria) Rupert Hollaus	NSU	(West Germany) Werner Haas	NSU	(New Zealand) Rod Coleman	AJS	(Federation of Rhodesia and Nyasaland) Ray Amm	Norton	Report
1953			(United Kingdom) Leslie Graham	MV Agusta	(United Kingdom) Fergus Anderson	Moto Guzzi	(Federation of Rhodesia and Nyasaland) Ray Amm	Norton	(Federation of Rhodesia and Nyasaland) Ray Amm	Norton	Report
1952			(United Kingdom) Cecil Sandford	MV Agusta	(United Kingdom) Fergus Anderson	Moto Guzzi	(United Kingdom) Geoff Duke	Norton	(Republic of Ireland) Reg Armstrong	Norton	Report
1951			(United Kingdom) Cromie McCandless	Mondial	(United Kingdom) Tommy Wood	Moto Guzzi	(United Kingdom) Geoff Duke	Norton	(United Kingdom) Geoff Duke	Norton	Report
1950					(Italy) Dario Ambrosini	Benelli	(United Kingdom) Artie Bell	Norton	(United Kingdom) Geoff Duke	Norton	Report
1949					(Republic of Ireland) Manliff Barrington	Moto Guzzi	(United Kingdom) Freddie Frith	Velocette	(United Kingdom) Harold Daniell	Norton	Report

=== Current lap records ===
Category	Rider(s)	Machine	Tyres	Year	Time	Average speed		Source
Category	Rider(s)	Machine	Tyres	Year	Time	mph	km/h	Source
Outright (all categories)	Peter Hickman	BMW M1000RR	Dunlop	2023	16:36.114	136.358	219.447	
Superbike TT	Michael Dunlop	Honda CBR1000RR	Dunlop	2024	16:38.953	135.970	218.823	
Supersport TT	Michael Dunlop	Yamaha YZF-R6	Dunlop	2023	17:21.604	130.403	209.863	
Supertwin TT	Michael Dunlop	Paton S1-R		2025	18:23:790	123.056	198.039	
Lightweight TT	Michael Dunlop	Paton S1-R Lightweight	Metzeler	2018	18:26.543	122.750	197.547	
Ultra-Lightweight TT	Chris Palmer	Honda RS125		2004	20:20.87	110.52	177.86	
Senior TT	Peter Hickman	BMW S1000RR	Dunlop	2018	16:42.778	135.452	217.989	
Superstock TT	Peter Hickman	BMW M1000RR	Dunlop	2023	16.36.115	136.358	219.447	
TT Zero	Michael Rutter	Mugen Shinden	Dunlop	2019	18:34.172	121.91	196.20	
Sidecar TT	Ryan Crowe and Callum Crowe	Honda LCR Sidecar	Hoosier	2025	18:42.350	121.021	194.764	

=== Current race records ===
Category	Laps	Rider(s)	Machine	Tyres	Year	Race time	Average speed	
Category	Laps	Rider(s)	Machine	Tyres	Year	Race time	mph	km/h
Superstock TT	3	Peter Hickman	BMW S1000RR		2023	50:48:301	133.676	215.085
Superstock TT	4	Peter Hickman	BMW S1000RR	Dunlop	2018	01:08:49.976	131.553	211.714
Superbike TT	6	Michael Dunlop	BMW S1000RR	Dunlop	2023	01:43:01.855	131.832	212.163
Supersport TT	4	Michael Dunlop	Yamaha YZF-R6		2023	01:10:50.234	127.831	205.724
Supertwin TT	4	Michael Dunlop	Paton 650	Metzeler	2018	01:15:05.032	120.601	194.088
Lightweight TT	3	Ivan Lintin	Kawasaki ER650	Metzeler	2015	57:06.070	118.936	191.409
Senior TT	6	Peter Hickman	BMW S1000RR	Dunlop	2018	01:43:08.065	131.700	211.951
Senior TT	4	John McGuinness	Honda CBR1000RR	Dunlop	2015	01:09:23.903	130.481	209.989
TT Zero	1	Michael Rutter	Mugen Shinden	Dunlop	2019	18:34.172	121.91	196.20
Sidecar TT	3	Ben Birchall and Tom Birchall	Honda CBR Sidecar	Avon	2023	56:41.815	119.816	192.825

=== Record for fastest newcomer ===
	Rider(s)	Machine	Year	Average speed	
	Rider(s)	Machine	Year	mph	km/h
1	(Northern Ireland) Glenn Irwin	Honda	2022	129.850	208.973
2	(England) Peter Hickman	BMW	2014	129.104	207.773
3	(England) Davey Todd	Suzuki	2018	128.379	206.606
4	(Isle of Man) Nathan Harrison	Honda	2022	128.087	206.136
5	(Australia) Josh Brookes	Suzuki	2013	127.726	205.555
6	(Isle of Man) Ryan Cringle	Honda	2023	126.096	202.932
7	(England) Steve Plater	Yamaha	2007	125.808	202.468
8	(England) Simon Andrews	BMW	2011	125.134	201.384
9	(Scotland) Keith Amor	Honda	2007	124.856	200.936
10	(Austria) Horst Saiger	Kawasaki	2013	123.846	199.311

=== Race awards ===
Most Meritorious Female Competitor – The Susan Jenness Trophy, named after Susan Jenness in memory of losing her life some years ago whilst marshalling a UK off-road event, was awarded yearly by the Executive Committee of the TT Supporters' Club, in recognition of the "most meritorious performance by a female competitor" during the previous TT meeting. The award has not been awarded since 2019.

Rider(s)	Race Category	Year
(England) Jenny Tinmouth	solo competitor	2010
(England) Fiona Baker-Milligan (now. Baker-Holden)	as passenger, Sidecar 600 cc	2011
(Isle of Man) Debbie Baron	as driver, Ireson Kawasaki Sidecar 600 cc	2012
(France) Estelle Leblond	as driver, Sidecar 600 cc	2013
(France) Estelle Leblond	as driver, Sidecar 600 cc	2014
(England) Fiona Baker-Milligan (now. Baker-Holden)	as passenger, Sidecar 600 cc	2015
(England) Maria Costello	solo competitor	2016
(France) Estelle Leblond & (France) Melanie Farnier	Sidecar 600 cc	2017
(England) Julie Canipa	as passenger, Sidecar 600 cc	2018
(England) Maria Costello	solo competitor	2019

== In media ==
=== Video games ===
There have been numerous video games based on the Isle of Man TT; the first was the 1995 Sega arcade game Manx TT Super Bike, which was later ported to the Sega Saturn in 1997. Several other games have followed since, including Suzuki TT Superbikes (2005), TT Superbikes: Real Road Racing Championship and TT Superbikes Legends (both 2008), all of which were released exclusively for the PlayStation 2, and developed by Jester Interactive.

Bigben Interactive has since revived the TT game license, releasing TT Isle Of Man: Ride on the Edge in 2018 and two sequels in 2020 and 2023.

== Connected events ==
The Ramsey Sprint has been run since 1978 and is one of the biggest events during the TT race festival. The Sprint is run along the 1 km long Mooragh Promenade. The music festival Sprintfest is also held in the same town, Ramsey, on the weekend between practice week and race week.

== See also ==
- List of named corners of the Snaefell Mountain Course
- List of Isle of Man TT Mountain Course fatalities
- Manx Grand Prix
- Southern 100
- North West 200
- Ulster Grand Prix
- Outline of motorcycles and motorcycling

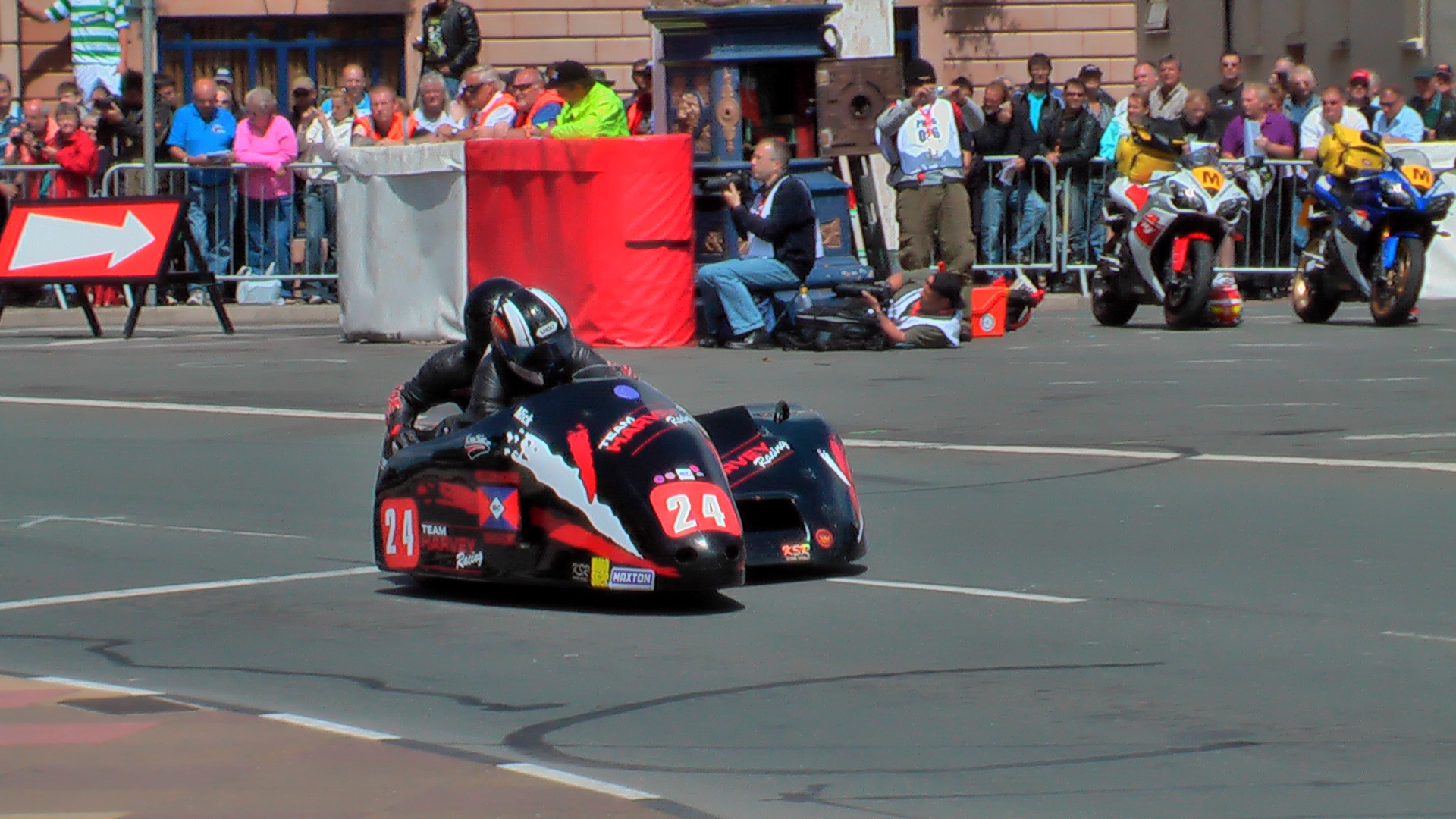
Parliament Square, Ramsey on a race day in 2008

== Notes ==
=== References ===
- Harris, Nick (1 May 1990). Motocourse History of the Isle of Man Tourist Trophy Races 1907–1989. Hazelton Publishing. ISBN 0-905138-71-6.
- Savage, Mike (1997). TT Heroes. Amulree Publications. ISBN 0-9521126-9-8.
- Snelling, Bill (15 July 1998). The Tourist Trophy in Old Photographs Collected by Bill Snelling. Sutton Publishing. ISBN 1-84015-059-9.
- Noyes, Denis (1999). 50 Years of Moto Grand Prix. Hazelton Publishing Ltd. ISBN 1-874557-83-7.
- McDiarmid, Mac (13 May 2004). The Magic of The TT: A Century of Racing over The Mountain. J H Haynes & Co Ltd. ISBN 1-84425-002-4.
- Wright, David (2006). TT Topics and Tales. Amulree Publications. ISBN 1-901508-09-9.
- Duckworth, Mick (2007). TT 100 – The Authorised History of the Isle of Man Tourist Trophy Racing. Lily Publications. ISBN 978-1-89960-267-4.
- Stroud, Jon (2007). The Little Book of the TT. Green Umbrella Publishing. ISBN 1-905828-24-1.
- Wright, David (2007). 100 Years of the Isle of Man TT Races: A Century of Motorcycle Racing. Crowood Press. ISBN 1-86126-906-4.
- Pidcock, Fred; Snelling, Bill (2007). History of the Isle of Man Clubman's TT Races 1947–1956. Amulree Publications. ISBN 1-901508-10-2.
- Barker, Stuart (3 May 2007). 100 One Hundred Years of the TT. Century. ISBN 1-84605-235-1.
- Richardson, Matthew (9 July 2024). A History of the Sidecar TT Races, 1923–2023. Pen & Sword Transport. ISBN 978-1-39904-454-7.
