= Douglas Mark III =

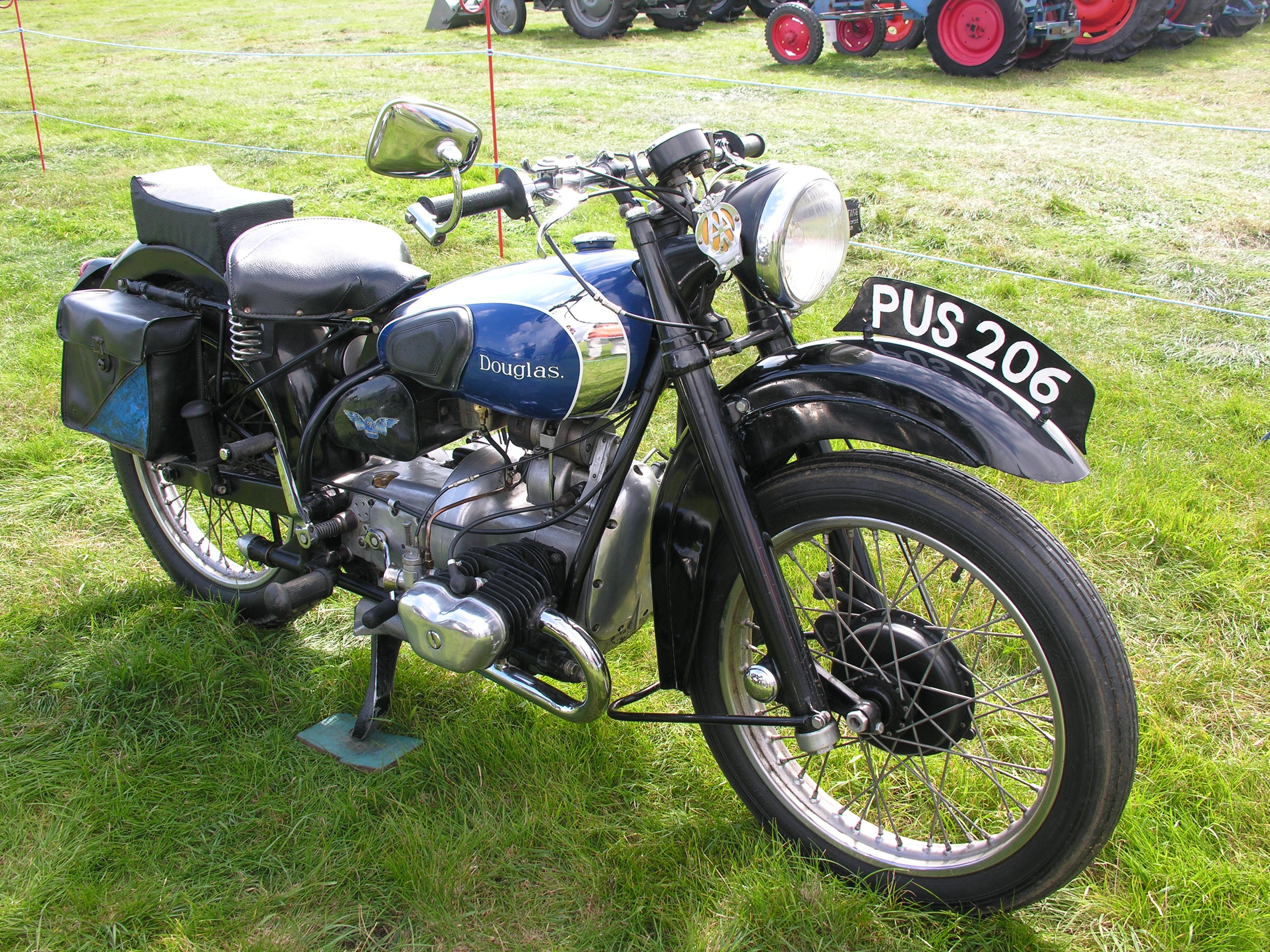
- Manufacturer: Douglas Motorcycle Company, Bristol
- Production: MkIII 1948–1949, Mk IV 1950, Mk V 1951
- Predecessor: Douglas T35
- Engine: 348.4 cc (21.26 cu in) horizontally opposed twin cylinder four stroke
- Bore / stroke: 60.8 mm × 60 mm (2.39 in × 2.36 in)
- Top speed: 70 miles per hour (110 km/h)
- Power: 18 brake horsepower (18 PS; 13 kW) @ 4,500 rpm
- Torque: 15 newton-metres (11 lbf⋅ft) @ 2,250 rpm
- Transmission: Four-speed with chain final drive
- Wheelbase: 1,463 millimetres (57.6 in)
- Dimensions: L: 1,662 millimetres (65.4 in); W: 337 millimetres (13.3 in)
- Seat height: 800 millimetres (31 in)
- Weight: 300 pounds (140 kg) (dry)

The Douglas Mark III is a British motorcycle designed and built by Douglas motorcycles in Bristol between 1948 and 1949. The 350 cc flat twin engine in the Douglas Mark III was based on a Second World War electricity generator. As well as the 1948-9 Douglas Mark III, Douglas also produced a Mark III "De Luxe", a Mark III Sports, and a rigid-framed motorcycle trials Competition version.

== History ==
During the Second World War the Bristol-based Douglas motorcycle company produced stationary generator engines using their 348 cc overhead valve flat twin. One of these Douglas generators was used at Winston Churchill's wartime summit meeting held next to the Sphinx in Giza. By the end of the war in 1945, Douglas restarted motorcycle production – much to the surprise of the industry, as it was generally expected that the war had led to other interests, with the company being taken over by Aero Engines Ltd, so there were not many engineering staff left for the development of new motorcycles. The Douglas T35 used the same flat-twin 350 cc as the generator, mounted in a duplex fame with torsion bar rear suspension. The T35 was an unexpected export success; 1947 factory records show them being exported to Canada, Switzerland, Belgium, Santiago, and Russia.

== Development ==
In 1948, the company developed a series of motorcycles based on the T35. Designed by George Halliday, these featured Douglas "Radialraulic" forks with the front wheel spindle carried on short leading links pivoted at the rear of the fork stanchions – with springs and a damping mechanism inside the stanchions. Although the frame and suspension were innovative, the engine was essentially a generator, designed to run for long periods at a steady speed and it did not cope well with the varying engine speeds of motorcycling. There was also a tendency to sideways shaking at low engine speeds which was a feature of the horizontally opposed engine. Douglas hired former Sunbeam motorcycles designer Erling Poppe as Technical Director, Freddie Dixon as their specialist engine tuner and Walter Moore (who designed the Norton CS1) as Works Superintendent. The result was the 1949 Douglas Mark III, which had improved performance through an uprated cylinder head, combustion chambers, and pistons. Douglas also produced a Mark III "De Luxe", a Mark III Sports, and a rigid-framed motorcycle trials Competition version with high-level exhausts and a less deeply valanced front mudguard. There never was a Douglas Mark II, and the Mark IV was short-lived, so the end of the line of development was the Mark V produced between 1951 and 1954, when it was replaced by the Douglas Dragonfly.

== Competition success ==
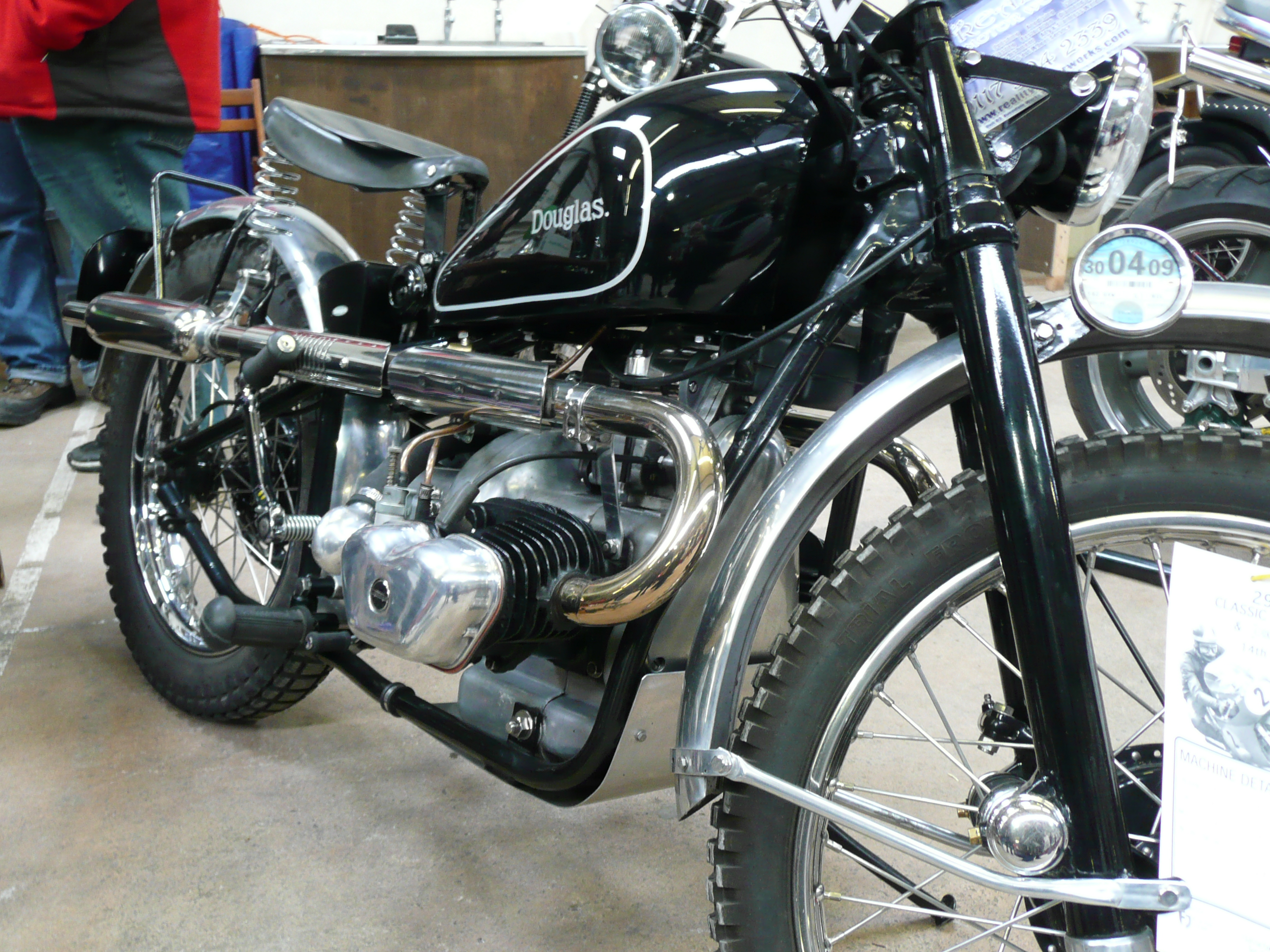
Douglas Mark III Competition version

Motorcycle trials rider David Tye worked for Douglas as a sales rep, competing at weekends in the factory trials team. In 1950, he won the Nevis Trophy and the Special First Class Award in the demanding Scottish Six Days Trial riding the Douglas Mark III Competition model. The low centre of mass of the flat twin was useful for trials control but it did have a clearance problem over the rough ground. Occasionally one of the carburettors would be knocked off, but the team developed a "quick change" replacement and always kept spares ready.

Works rider Don Chapman on the Douglas Mark III Sports gave Douglas their only major successes in motorcycle racing by winning at the Silverstone Circuit in 1950. Securing a win by 19 seconds, Chapman was awarded the Motor Cycling magazine prize for "most meritorious" performance in the Clubmans races.

== See also ==
- List of Douglas motorcycles
- List of motorcycles of the 1940s
