= 1923 Isle of Man TT =

Annual motorcycle racing event

1923 Isle of Man Tourist Trophy
- Date: June 11, 13 and 15, 1923
- Location: Douglas, Isle of Man
- Course: Snaefell Mountain Course; 37.739 miles (60.74 km).
- Organiser: Auto-Cycle Union
- Clerk: T.W. Loughborough

Junior TT
- First: Stanley Woods, Cotton
- Second: Harry Harris, AJS
- Third: Alfred Alexander, Douglas

Fastest lap
- Jimmy Simpson; 38min. 0sec. 59.59 mph New record

Lightweight TT
- First: Jock Porter, New Gerrard
- Second: Bert le Vack, New Imperial
- Third: Dan Hall, Rex-Acme

Fastest lap
- Wal Handley; 41min. 58sec. 53.95 mph New record

Sidecar TT
- First: Freddie Dixon, Douglas; Walter Denny
- Second: Graham Walker, Norton; Tony Mahon
- Third: George Tucker, Norton; Walter Moore

Fastest lap
- Harry Langman; 41min. 24sec. 54.69 mph New record

Senior TT
- First: Tom Sheard, Douglas
- Second: Graeme Black, Norton
- Third: Freddie Dixon, Indian

Fastest lap
- Jim Whalley; 37min. 54sec. 59.74 mph

The 1923 Isle of Man Tourist Trophy saw the introduction of the first Sidecar TT race over 3 laps, won by Freddie Dixon and passenger Walter Denney using a special Douglas motorcycle with a banking-sidecar in a time of 2 hours, 7 minutes and 48 seconds, at an average speed of 53.15 mph (85.54 km/h). The fastest Sidecar lap was by Harry Langman on a Scott at 54.69 mph (88.02 km/h).

The Senior race was held in poor weather and local course knowledge allowed local Isle of Man competitor Tom Sheard, also riding a Douglas, to win a second TT to add to his first win in the 1922 Junior TT. Another first-time winner was Stanley Woods, riding to his first of ten victories in the TT races, on a Cotton in the Junior TT. TT novice Jimmie Guthrie suffered a machine breakdown in the Junior 350 cc race, but he achieved six victories in later years.

Changes to the course occurred in 1923 with the adoption of a private road between Parliament Square and May Hill in Ramsey. Previously the course negotiated Albert Road and Tower Road in Ramsey and the new course length was 37.739 miles (revised to 37.733 miles (60.725 km) in 1938).

== Lightweight 250 cc Race ==
The 12th International Isle of Man Tourist Trophy

Pos	#	Rider	Bike	Lightweight TT race classification			
Pos	#	Rider	Bike	Laps	Time	Speed	Prizes & Remarks
1	29	(Scotland) Jock Porter	249cc New Gerrard	6	4:21:37	51.931 mph	1st Prize - Winner of Lightweight Tourist Trophy, £30 and special gold medal.
2	12	(United Kingdom) Bert le Vack	246cc New Imperial	6	4:26:19	51.014 mph	2nd Prize - £20 and replica.
3	33	(United Kingdom) Dan Hall	249cc Rex-Acme	6	4:34:20	49.53 mph	3rd Prize - £10 and replica.
4	25	(United Kingdom) Reg. Gray	249cc Rex-Acme	6	4:35:29	49.31 mph	Replica.
5	41	(United Kingdom) Norman Black	249cc Cedos	6	4:35:46	49.26 mph	Replica.
6	31	(United Kingdom) Len Horton	246cc New Imperial	6	4:36:29	49.13 mph	Replica.
7	20	(United Kingdom) Phil Pike	248cc Levis	6	4:37:02	49.40 mph	Replica.
8	36	(United Kingdom) Wal Handley	248cc OK Junior	6	4:44:22	47.78 mph	Replica.
9	5	(United Kingdom) P.Walker	250cc Excelsior	6	4:44:53	47.69 mph	Replica.
10	1	(United Kingdom) Geoff Davison	248cc Levis	6	4:51:43	46.57 mph	
10	37	(United Kingdom) F. Simpson, junr.	250cc Excelsior	6	4:51:43	46.57 mph	
12	24	(United Kingdom) Ralph Crauford	249cc P.V.	6	4:55:36	45.96 mph	
Fastest lap: Wal Handley, 41min. 58sec. 53.95 mph (New record)

== Junior 350 cc Race ==
The 12th International Isle of Man Tourist Trophy

Pos	#	Rider	Bike	Junior TT race classification			
Pos	#	Rider	Bike	Laps	Time	Speed	Prizes & Remarks
1	29	(Republic of Ireland) Stanley Woods	348cc Cotton	6	4:03:47	55.739 mph	1st Prize - Winner of Junior Tourist Trophy, £40 and special gold medal.
2	18	(United Kingdom) Harry Harris	349cc AJS	6	4:06:16	55.17 mph	2nd Prize - £20 and replica.
3	57	(Scotland) Alfie Alexander	346cc Douglas	6	4:09:35	54.43 mph	3rd Prize - £10 and replica.
4	24	(United Kingdom) Jack Watson-Bourne	349cc Matador-Bradshaw	6	4:13:41	53.55 mph	Replica.
5	67	(United Kingdom) Vic Anstice	346cc Douglas	6	4:15:27	53.18 mph	Replica.
6	26	(United Kingdom) Frank Longman	349cc AJS	6	4:17:33	52.74 mph	Replica.
7	71	(United Kingdom) Freddie Morgan	348cc Cotton	6	4:18:17	52.60 mph	Replica.
8	20	(United Kingdom) George Tottey	346cc New Imperial	6	4:18:33	52.55 mph	Replica.
9	5	(United Kingdom) Cyril Pullin	346cc Douglas	6	4:19:27	52.36 mph	Replica.
10	43	(United Kingdom) George Strange	349cc OK-Junior	6	4:24:49	51.30 mph	Replica.
11	37	(United Kingdom) S. Ford	346cc Douglas	6	4:31:42	50.00 mph	Replica.
12	59	(United Kingdom) W. Barr	349cc Matador-Bradshaw	6	4:32:03	49.94 mph	Replica.
Fastest lap: Jimmy Simpson, 381min. 00sec. 59.59 mph (New record)

== Senior 500 cc Race ==
The 12th International Isle of Man Tourist Trophy

Pos	#	Rider	Bike	Senior TT race classification			
Pos	#	Rider	Bike	Laps	Time	Speed	Prizes & Remarks
1	2	(Isle of Man) Tom Sheard	497cc Douglas	6	4:04:43	55.55 mph	1st Prize - Winner of Senior Tourist Trophy, £50 and special gold medal.
2	51	(Scotland) Graeme Black	490cc Norton	6	4:06:26	55.14 mph	2nd Prize - £20 and replica.
3	46	(United Kingdom) Freddie Dixon	497cc Douglas	6	4:07:02	55.01 mph	3rd Prize - £10 and replica.
4	27	(United Kingdom) Graham Walker	490cc Norton	6	4:07:03	55.00 mph	Replica.
5	31	(United Kingdom) Tom Simister	490cc Norton	6	4:10:23	54.26 mph	Replica.
6	30	(United Kingdom) Jack Emerson	497cc Douglas	6	4:12.25	53.83 mph	Replica.
7	12	(Northern Ireland) Jimmy Shaw	490cc Norton	6	4:17:20	52.72 mph	Replica.
8	20	(United Kingdom) Tommy Allchin	497cc Douglas	6	4:21:48	51.89 mph	Replica.
9	4	(United Kingdom) Tommy de la Hay	492cc Sunbeam	6	4:23:14	51.61 mph	Replica.
10	1	(Canada) Alec Bennett	497cc Douglas	6	4:28:22	50.62 mph	Replica.
11		(United Kingdom) Jack Watson-Bourne	Scott-Squirrel	6	4:30:07	50.30 mph	Replica.
12		(United Kingdom) Arthur Booth	350cc New Scale	6	4:30:19	50.26 mph	Replica.
13	50	(Scotland) Alfie Alexander	497cc Douglas	6	4:32:51	49.79 mph	Replica.
14	33	(United Kingdom) Hubert Hassall	490cc Norton	6	4:36:27	49.14 mph	
Fastest lap: Jim Whalley, 37min. 54sec. 59.74 mph

== Sidecar 500 cc Race ==
The 12th International Isle of Man Tourist Trophy

Pos	#	Driver	Passenger	Bike	Sidecar TT race classification			
Pos	#	Driver	Passenger	Bike	Laps	Time	Speed	Prizes & Remarks
1	55	(United Kingdom) Freddie Dixon	(United Kingdom) Walter Denny	596cc Douglas	3	2:07:48	53.153 mph	1st Prize - Winner of Sidecar Tourist Trophy, £40 and special gold medal.
2	61	(United Kingdom) Graham Walker	(Isle of Man) Tony Mahon	588cc Norton	3	2:09:26	52.50 mph	2nd Prize - £20.
3	53	(United Kingdom) George Tucker	(Wales) Walter Moore	588cc Norton	3	2:10:27	52.07 mph	3rd Prize - £10.
4	56	(United Kingdom) Douglas Davidson		596cc Douglas	3	2:30:15	45.21 mph	Replica.
5	51	(United Kingdom) Harry Reed	(United Kingdom) Joe Hooson	348cc DOT-Bradshaw	3	2:36:04	43.52 mph	Replica.
6	52	(United Kingdom) Freddie Hatton		596cc Douglas	3	2:58:22	38.80 mph	
DNF	59	(United Kingdom) Harry Langman	(United Kingdom) Claude Temple	Scott-Squirrel	1	Crashed on lap 2 at Braddan Bridge turning upside down. Both riders suffered only minor injuries.		
Fastest lap: Harry Langman, 41min. 24sec. 54.69mph
