= Douglas 2¾ HP =

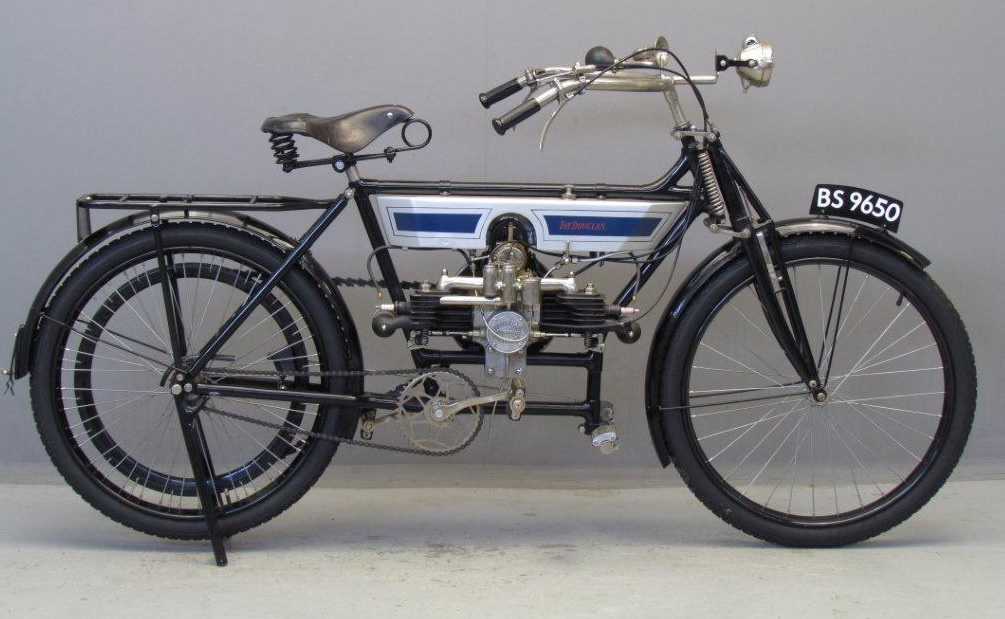
- 1910 Douglas 2¾ HP from the right side
- Manufacturer: Douglas
- Production: 1907–1922
- Predecessor: Light Motors Ltd. Fairy
- Engine: 348 cc (21.2 cu in), 2-cylinder, horizontally-opposed, 4-stroke
- Bore / stroke: 60.8 mm × 60 mm (2.39 in × 2.36 in)
- Top speed: 45 mph (72 km/h)
- Power: 8 hp (5.97 kW)
- Transmission: 2-speed
- Tyres: 2 1/4 in × 26 in (57 mm × 660 mm)
- Footnotes / references Kemp/De Cet, Pullen, Tragatsch & Vanderveen

The Douglas 2¾ HP was a motorcycle produced from 1907 by British firm Douglas. The 2¾ HP was based on an earlier design by Light Motors Ltd., with Douglas assuming production when the former firm collapsed.

The 2¾ HP saw widespread service with the militaries of the British Empire during the First World War, as well as the Belgian and French Armies during the conflict. Post-war it remained in production until the early 1920s, additionally many former military examples were refurbished and sold to civilian customers.

== Design ==
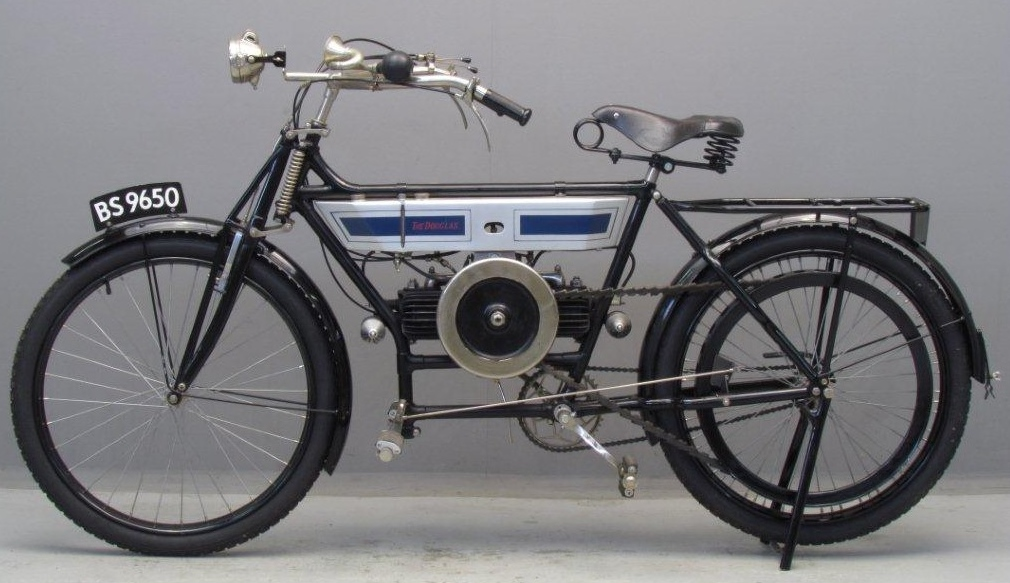
1910 Douglas 2¾ HP from the left side showing the flywheel

The 2¾ HP was powered by a 2-cylinder horizontally-opposed 4-stroke engine with a bore and stroke of 60.8 mm × 60 mm (2.39 in × 2.36 in) and 348 cc (21.2 cu in) displacement. (Note: Various sources state the 2¾ HP's engine had a displacement of 347 cc (21.2 cu in), 348 cc (21.2 cu in) or 350 cc (21 cu in).) The engine had exposed side-valves and a large flywheel on the left side, and produced 8 hp (5.97 kW) of power. The engine's small pistons, low compression, reciprocal piston-movement and comparatively heavy flywheel made it incredibly smooth running. Additionally, these same design features made the 2¾ HP extremely easy to push start, which was a significant advantage in military service.

The 2¾ HP was capable of 45 mph (72 km/h), although 30 mph (48 km/h) was much less demanding for the rider.

In 1915 Douglas introduced a new militarised "WD Model" of the 2¾ HP which incorporated a number of improvements for military service. Changes that improved the engine performance included larger induction and exhaust ports, a re-profiled camshaft, strengthened pistons and increased cylinder fins. Other improvements included using a stronger "Colonial Model" frame, strengthened belt-wheel attachments and rear wheel mountings, and larger hubs with improved bearing seals that prevented ingestion of mud and dust, which had previously caused the bearings to clog in harsh military conditions. These improvements could be retrospectively fitted to earlier models as they came in for overhaul.

== History ==
The Douglas 2¾ HP descends from a motorcycle design by Joseph Barter, who had been producing motorcycles from 1902. Barter's original single cylinder motorcycles never sold well, and in 1904 he began development of a new design with an horizontally-opposed twin cylinder engine which he called the Fée (French for Fairy). In 1905 Barter founded a company to produce the design, Light Motors Ltd., in Kingswood, Bristol, and renamed the Fée the Fairy. The Fairy was a 2½ HP design, the engine had a displacement of 200 cc (12 cu in) and was quite advanced for the time. Light Motors Ltd. largely assembled the Fairy from components produced by outside firms, one of which was the Douglas Engineering Company, also of Kingswood, who produced the Fairy's engine and some other components. The Douglas Engineering Company was founded in Kingswood in 1882, originally a foundry it later branched out to include general engineering.

In 1906 Light Motors Ltd. failed due to lack of sales, Barter sold the rights to the Fairy to Douglas and became an employee of the company. With Barter's assistance, Douglas made some alterations to the Fairy including enlarging the engine and changing to a direct belt-drive, and in 1907 the 2¾ HP was introduced. Initially sales were poor, in the first two years under 100 were sold, but in 1910 Douglas added a 2-speed gearbox, and sales started to improve. That year a 2¾ HP won a reliability trial, and in July another 2¾ HP set a new record for travelling between Lands End to John O'Groats, 39 hours and 40 minutes. Further successes were recorded between 1911–1914, in 1912 improvements were made to the engine which increased power output to 8 horsepower (6 kW), and 2¾ HPs claimed 1st, 2nd and 4th at that year's Isle of Man TT Junior TT. By 1914 Douglas had sold approximately 12,000 2¾ HPs.

=== World War military use ===
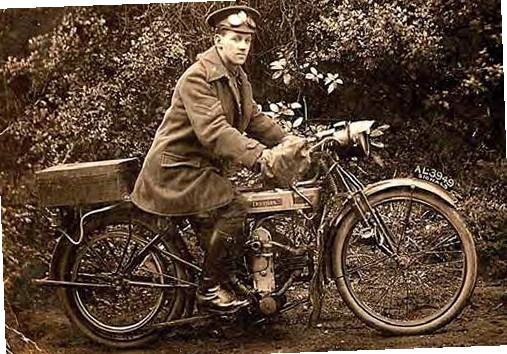
A British Army dispatch rider on a Douglas 2¾ HP during the First World War

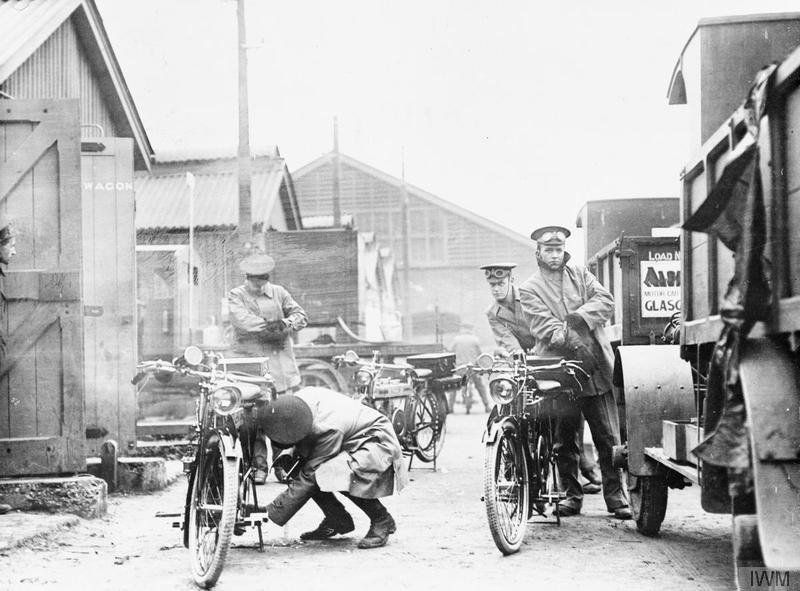
Canadian Army dispatch riders on Douglas 2¾ HPs during a training exercise, Salisbury Plain 28 January 1915

With the outbreak of the First World War in 1914, Douglas was awarded War Office contracts to supply Douglas 2¾ HPs to the British Army, the motorcycle's competition successes and reputation for reliability being major influences on the War Office. In early 1915 the 2¾ HP, along with the Triumph Model H, were standardised as the official dispatch rider motorcycles of the British Empire's forces on the Western Front.

In British military service, the 2¾ HP gained a great reputation for reliability, and in terms of numbers it was the second most numerous motorcycle in British service behind the Triumph. In addition to the Western Front, 2¾ HPs were used during the Gallipoli campaign, the Sinai and Palestine campaign, the South West Africa campaign, the East African campaign, in Egypt and during Commander Oliver Locker-Lampson's Russian expedition. In these theatres they faced exceptionally rough terrain and extremes of temperatures, from below freezing to over 122 °F (50 °C). The 2¾ HP's light weight made them easy to manhandle and very well suited to negotiating rough terrain and the engine earned a reputation for never overheating even in extreme heat, their only major fault was a tendency for the front spark plug to short out in wet conditions.

By the end of the War, a number of more modern motorcycle models were available to the British, particularly from Harley-Davidson and Indian, but the British considered the 2¾ HP, and the Triumph, to be superior for military use.

Figures vary as to how many Douglas motorcycles were produced during the war, (Note: Some sources state Douglas produced 70,000 motorcycles during the First World War. Douglas production figures during the War are partially confused as a large number of their motorcycle engines were produced as static generating engines.) but best estimates are around 25,000 of both the 2¾ HP and Douglas's 4 HP model were produced during the conflict. In addition to serving with the British Empire's forces, 2¾ HPs were also supplied to the Belgian and French Armies during the war. At the time of the Armistice in 1918, 13,477 2¾ HPs remained in British military service.

=== Post-war ===
After the war, former military Douglas 2¾ HPs were reconditioned, repainted and resold to the public. Like a number of companies, Douglas carried out much of this work on ex-military 2¾ HPs.

Douglas put a civilian version of the Douglas 2¾ HP back into production in 1919, keeping it in production until 1922 when it was replaced by more modern designs with overhead valve engines. Additionally, post-war the 2¾ HP's engine was produced under licence in Germany by Bosch.

== See also ==
- List of Douglas motorcycles
