= List of Douglas motorcycles =

This is a list of Douglas motorcycles please add to it or update where you can:

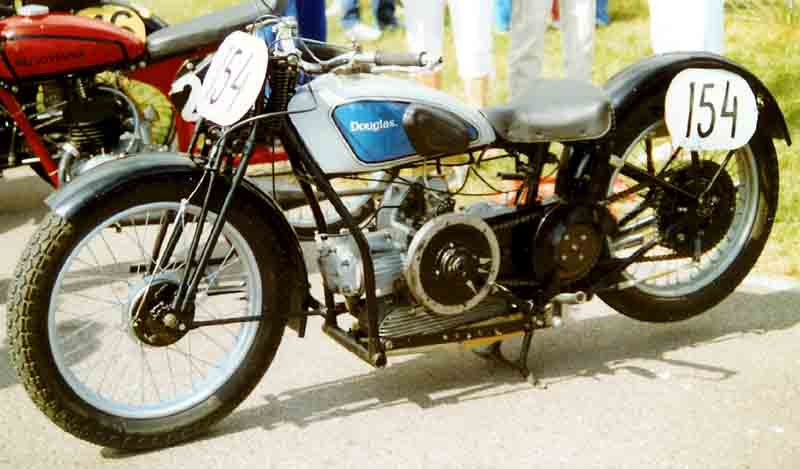
1929 Douglas S6 600 cc SV Racer

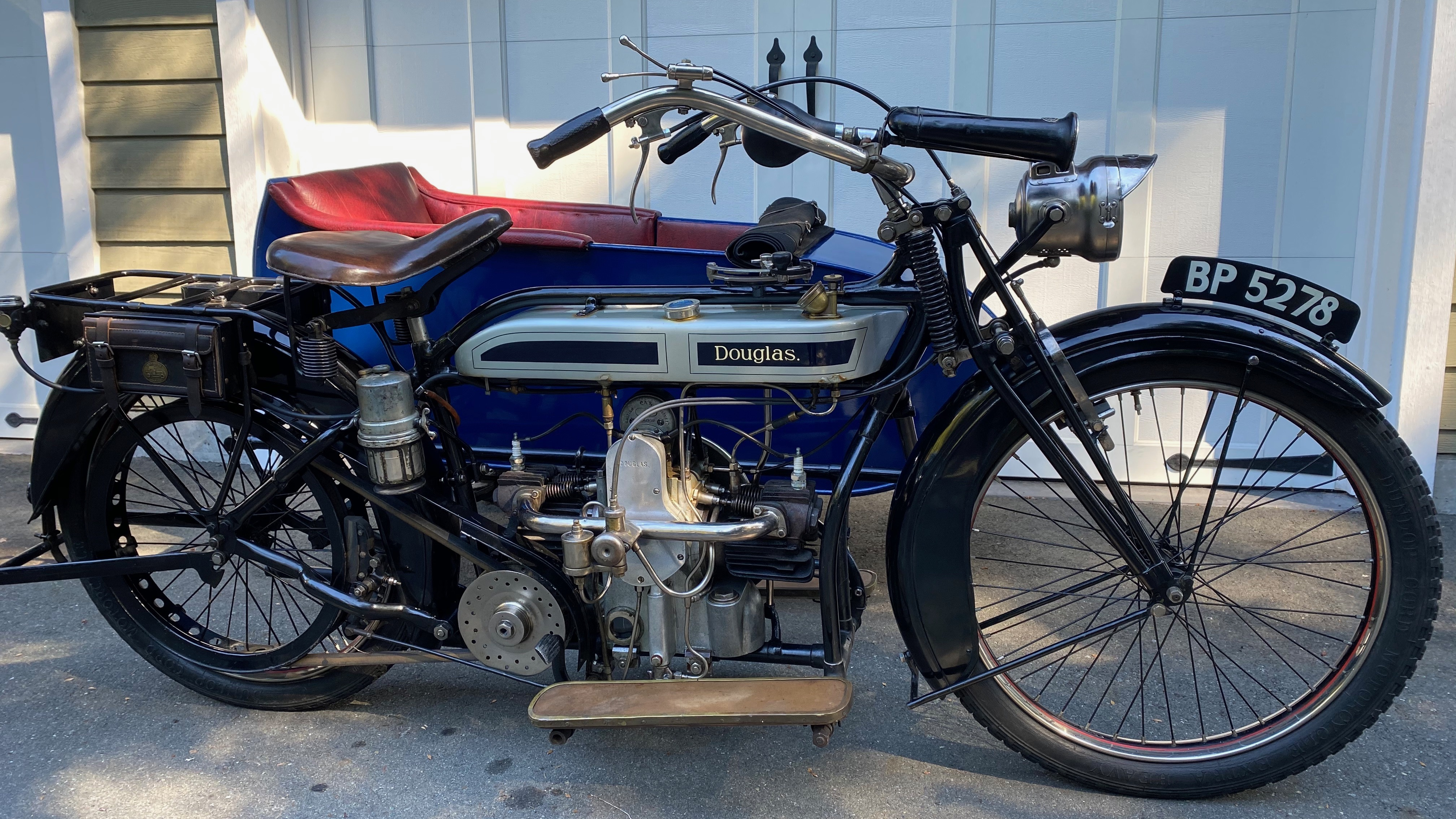
Model	Engine	Years	Notes
Douglas 348cc	349 cc	1907–1922	Developed primarily for use as a dispatch motorcycle. Usually referred to as the 2¾ HP (two and three quarter horsepower)
Douglas 596cc	596cc side-valve	1915-1924	Developed for use w sidecar during World War I. Also known as the 4HP (four horsepower)
TS 250cc	250 cc	1915
CW		1924
EW	350cc	1926
E/28	600 cc side-valve	1928
A/29	350 cc	1929
B/29	350 cc	1929	OHV Sports
D/29	350 cc	1929	Touring & Competition
E/29	600 cc side-valve	1929
F/29	600 cc side-valve	1929	Sports edition of E/29
G/29	600 cc	1929	OHV engine
H/29	600 cc	1929	OHV Sports Model
Dirt Track Model	500 cc	1929
T.T. Model	350 cc or 500 cc	1929	High speed competition bike
FW 500	500/600 cc	1929
S5	500 cc	1930
S6	600 cc	1930
T6	600 cc	1930
A.32	350 cc side-valve	1932
B.32	350 cc side-valve	1932	Touring
C.32	500 cc side-valve	1932
D.32	600 cc side-valve	1932	Greyhound Touring
E.32	600 cc side-valve	1932
F.32	500 cc ohv	1932	Sports
G.32	600 cc ohv	1932	Sports
H.32	750 cc side-valve	1932
K.32	350 cc ohv	1932	Touring
M.32	350 cc ohv	1932	Touring
S.W.5	500 cc ohv	1932	Speed
S.W.6	600 cc ohv	1932	Speed
D.T.5	500 cc ohv	1932	Dirt Track
D.T.6	600 cc ohv	1932	Dirt Track
SV	600 cc	1937	DeLuxe Twin
DC38	600cc (594cc)	1938	twin
T35	350 cc	1945
Mark III	350 cc	1949
Mark III De Luxe	350 cc	1949
Mark III Competition	350 cc	1949
Mark III Sports	350 cc	1948
Douglas "Vespa"		1950
Mark V	350 cc	1951
Douglas Dragonfly	348 cc horizontally opposed twin-cylinder four-stroke	1955–1957	1,457 Dragonfly motorcycles were produced before the company was taken over and production ended in 1957.

== See also ==
- List of AMC motorcycles
- List of Ariel motorcycles
- List of BSA motorcycles
- List of Norton motorcycles
- List of Triumph motorcycles
- List of Royal Enfield motorcycles
- List of Velocette motorcycles
- List of Vincent motorcycles
