= Douglas Dragonfly =

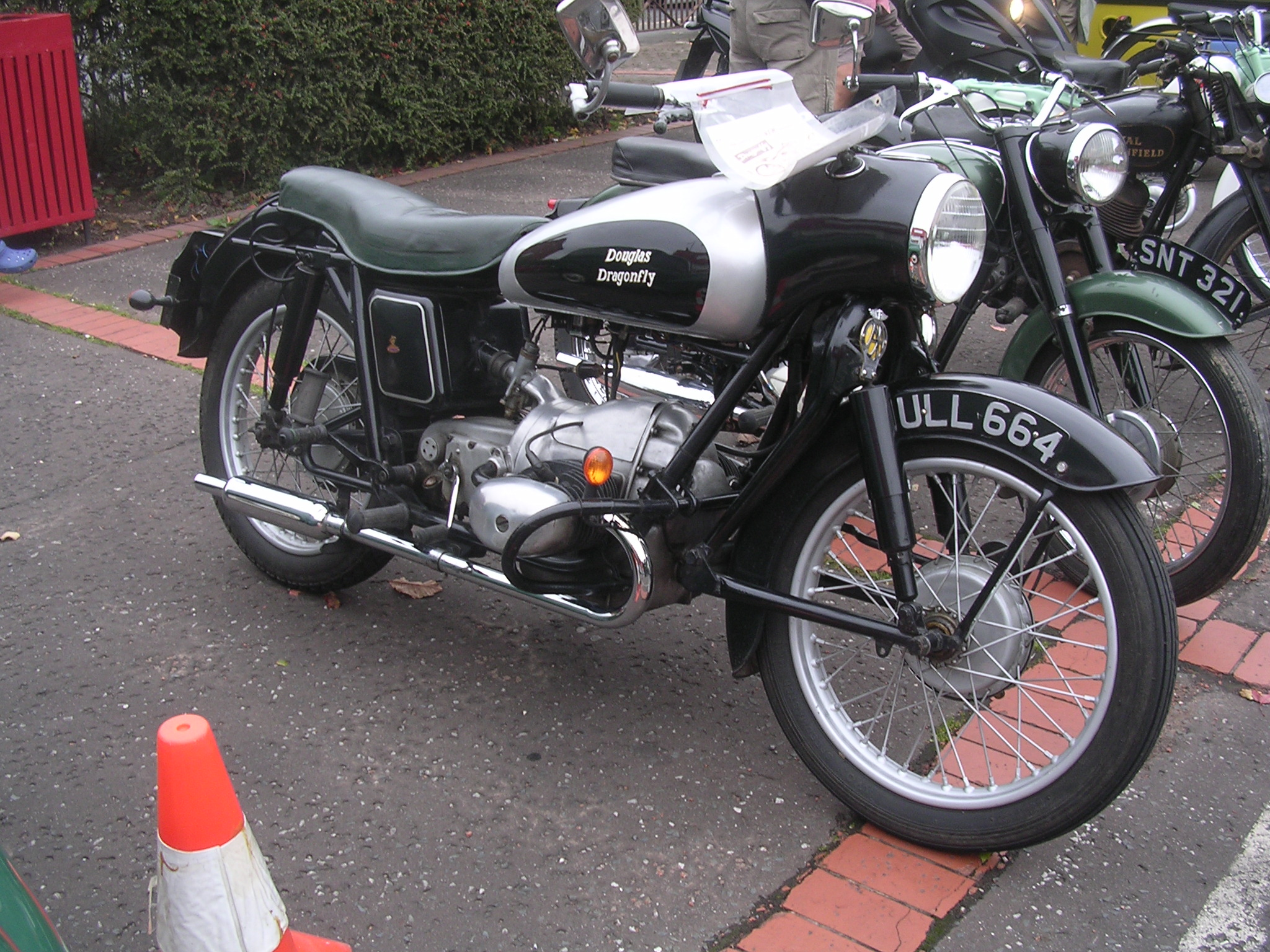
- Manufacturer: Douglas Motorcycle Company, Bristol
- Production: 1955–1957
- Predecessor: Douglas 500 cc
- Successor: None
- Engine: 348 cc (21.2 cu in) four stroke, OHV, flat twin
- Top speed: 70 mph (110 km/h)
- Power: 17 bhp (13 kW) @ 5,500 rpm
- Torque: 16 newton-metres (12 lbf⋅ft) @ 3,350 rpm
- Ignition type: Coil
- Transmission: Four speed manual, chain final drive
- Frame type: tubular double cradle
- Suspension: Leading link, front: Swingarm with twin hydraulic shock absorber, rear
- Brakes: Drum, front and rear
- Wheelbase: 56 inches (1,400 mm)
- Dimensions: L: 86 inches (2,200 mm); W: 15.6 inches (400 mm)
- Seat height: 30 inches (760 mm)
- Weight: 365.6 lb (166 kg) (dry)
- Fuel capacity: 5.5 imp gal (25 L; 6.6 US gal)
- Fuel consumption: 55 mpg_{‑US} (4.3 L/100 km; 66 mpg_{‑imp})

The Douglas Dragonfly is a motorcycle designed and built by Douglas motorcycles in Bristol. The last motorcycle produced by the company, the 1955 Dragonfly was an all-new motorcycle built to use an improved version of an existing engine. Despite its riding comfort, which was "equal to a car's", it did not sell well, and only 1,457 Dragonfly motorcycles were produced before the company was taken over and production ended in 1957. Very few Douglas motorcycles survive today.

== History ==
After World War II Douglas was in financial difficulty and reduced its output to the 350 cc flat-twin engine models with the engine mounted across the frame. The flat twin had been the Douglas trademark since 1906 and had a long history of Isle of Man TT racing successes.

== Development ==
The Dragonfly was known as the Dart while in development and was based on the Mark V Douglas and an earlier 500 cc (31 cu in) prototype. Aiming to overcome the company's outdated image, designers were commissioned from the Reynolds Tube Company to develop a completely new open duplex frame of welded tubing, including a swinging arm with twin Girling dampers (state of the art for the time) with leading link front suspension. The strengthened and streamlined 348 cubic centimetres (21.2 cu in) engine had a modern coil ignition, AC generator and distributor, with bolt-through cast iron cylinders and heads and pushrods made from Duralumin.

== Launch ==
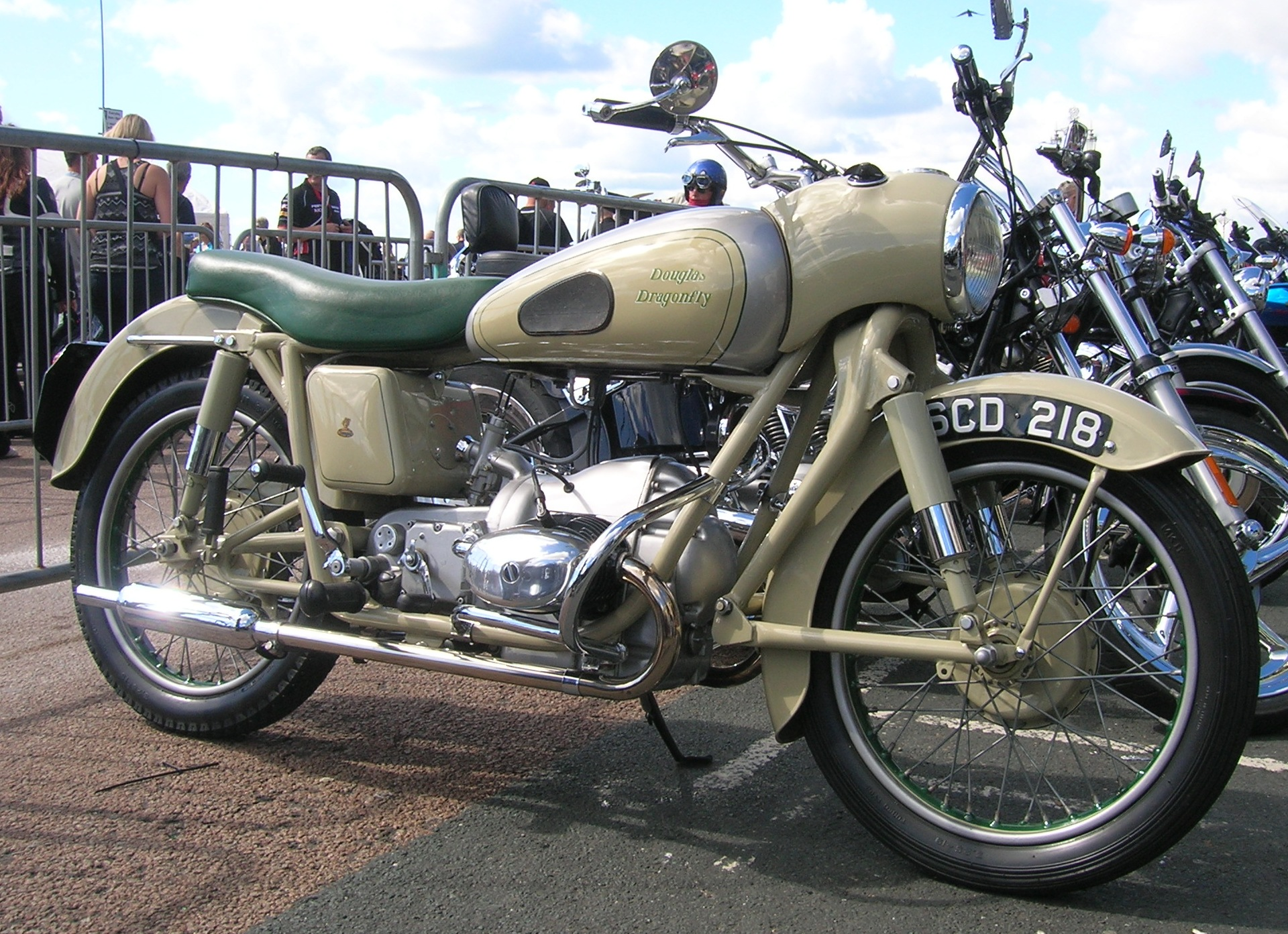
Douglas Dragonfly in distinctive alternative factory livery

The launch of the Dragonfly was the last chance of survival for the Douglas company when it featured at the 1954 Earls Court motorcycle show in a big display held in a giant micrometer. Although it aroused a lot of interest, Douglas' finances did not allow them to exploit demand and the Dragonfly did not go into volume production for nine months.

== Decline ==
As well as suffering from production delays, the Dragonfly was bigger and heavier than its predecessors and was very expensive. It was also noisy and acceleration was rather unpredictable. Douglas decided to concentrate on importing and license building Vespa scooters which were increasing in popularity, and only a little over 1500 Dragonfly motorcycles were ever built. While Douglas built the engine in-house, most other parts were sourced elsewhere. The Westinghouse Brake and Signal Company bought out Douglas in 1956, and production of Douglas Motorcycles ended in 1957 with the final Dragonflys being sold at discount by London dealer Pride & Clarke.

== See also ==
- List of Douglas motorcycles
- List of motorcycles of the 1950s
