= Douglas (motorcycles) =

British motorcycle manufacturer

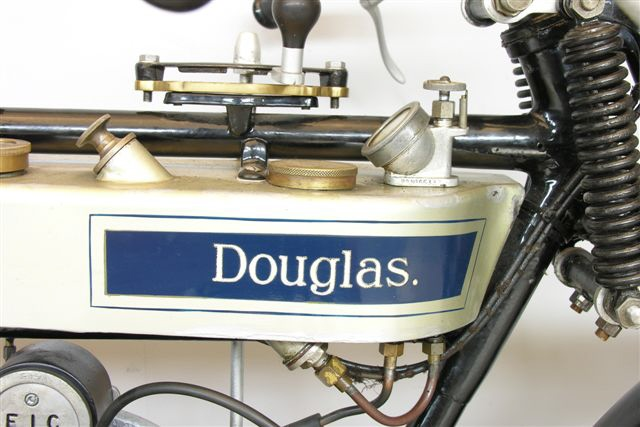
- Industry: Motorcycles
- Founded: 1907
- Defunct: 1957
- Fate: Bought by the Westinghouse Brake and Signal Company Ltd
- Headquarters: Kingswood, Bristol
- Key people: William and Edwin Douglas

Douglas was a British motorcycle manufacturer from 1907 to 1957 based in Kingswood, Bristol, owned by the Douglas family, and especially known for its horizontally opposed twin cylinder engined motorcycles and as manufacturers of speedway machines. The company also built a range of cars between 1913 and 1922.

== History ==
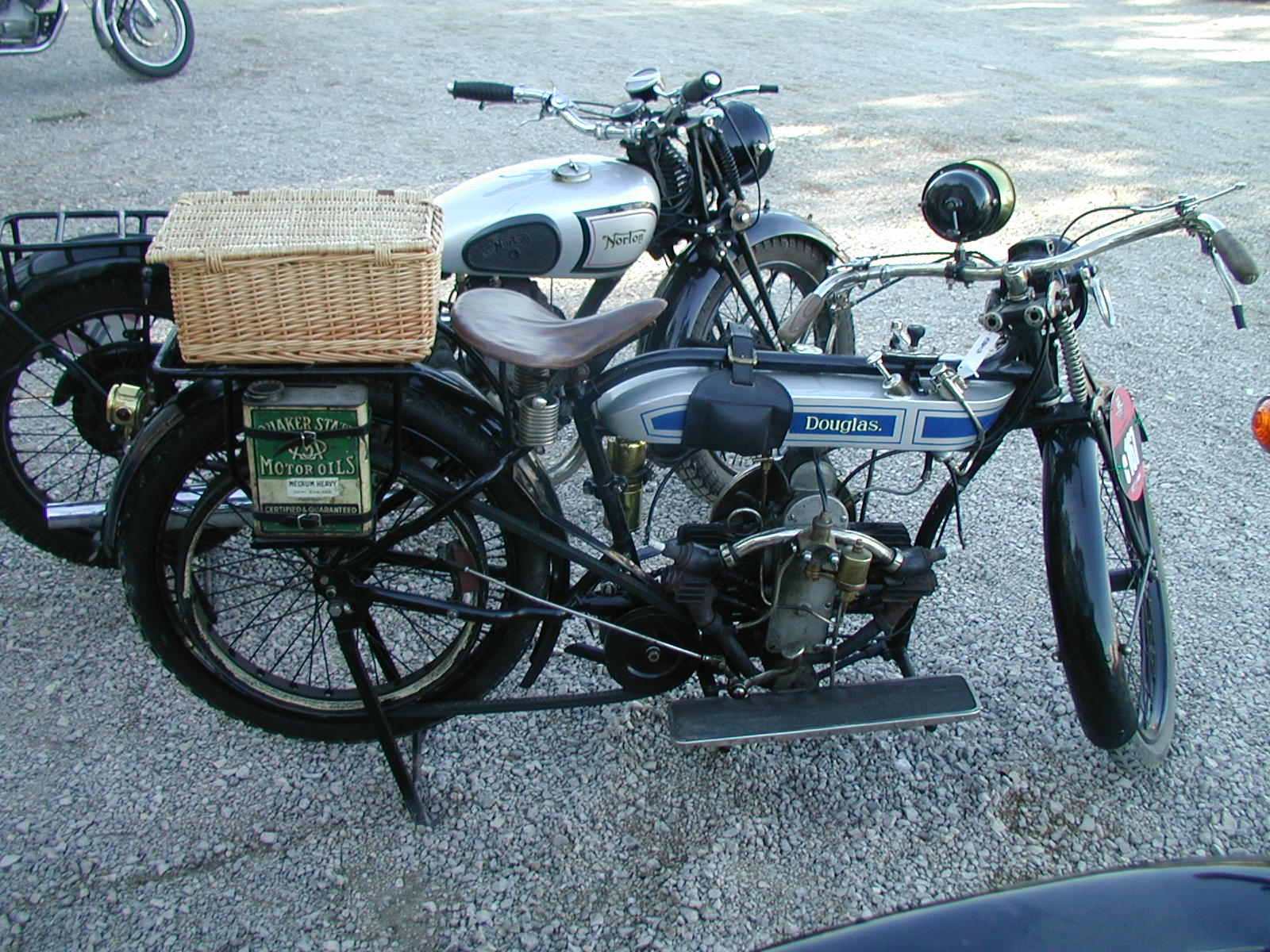
A Douglas motorcycle

The brothers William and Edwin Douglas founded the Douglas Engineering Company in Bristol in 1882. Initially doing blacksmith work, they progressed to foundry work.

Joseph F. Barter's Light Motors Ltd. was one of Douglas's customers. Barter built a single-cylinder bicycle engine between 1902 and 1904; he then developed the Fée bicycle engine system. The Fée's 200 cc flat-twin engine was mounted in-line with the frame, using chain drive to a countershaft beneath (with clutch); this then used a drive belt to power the bicycle's rear wheel. Barter founded Light Motors Ltd. to build the Fée system. Production began in 1905, and the Fée's name was anglicized to Fairy shortly afterward. In 1916 The Motor Cycle magazine claimed that the 1904 Fée was the earliest flat-twin motorcycle engine, of which there had since been many copies. Douglas made castings for Light Motors and took over the manufacturing rights when Light Motors went out of business in 1907.

From 1907 a 350 cc Douglas version was on sale, similar to the Fairy with the engine in-line mounted high in the frame, but without the chain driven countershaft beneath, and with belt final drive. At the 1907 Stanley Show they attracted a lot of attention with a V4 engined motorcycle, with automatic inlet valves, and two-speed drive. The V4 did not go into production, and by the 1908 show it was only the updated in-line twin that was on show, now lighter and with a lower engine position. Around 1911 the frame was modified to make the engine still lower, and in 1912 the automatic inlet valves were replaced by mechanically operated valves.

During World War I Douglas was a major motorcycle supplier, making around 70,000 motorcycles for military use. In a 1916 review of flat-twin engines in The Motor Cycle magazine two models of Douglas engine are listed. The 2¾ HP (348cc) with 60.5mm bore and 60mm stroke, with the valves placed side-by-side on the side of the engine. The other engine was the 4 hp (544cc) flat twin of 72mm bore and 68mm stroke. One of the significant differences with this larger engine was the oil was carried in the sump and supplied by pump to bearings and cylinders. The sump had a glass window to inspect the oil level. The valves were placed side by side above the cylinders. A third engine was the Williamson Flat Twin made by Douglas with cyclecars in mind, but produced for the Williamson Motor Company to use in its motor cycles since 1912. This was an 8 hp engine of 964cc, 85mm bore and 85mm stroke. Initially water cooled, from 1913 it was also available air-cooled.

In the 1920s Douglas built the first disc brakes, and had a Royal Warrant for the supply of motorcycles to the Princes, Albert and Henry.

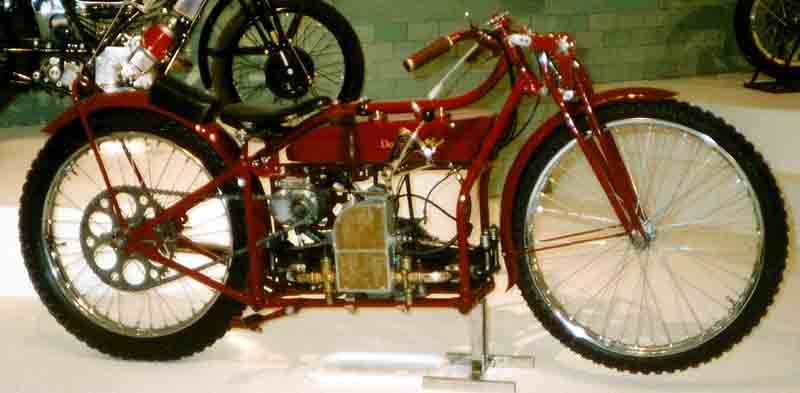
Douglas DT 500 cc, 1929

Douglas motorcycles also became popular in dirt track racing. The 1923 RA model with disc brakes was favoured initially and this prompted Douglas to build specific dirt track models. These motorcycle designs were gradually increased in size and power with 500 cc and 600 cc engines fitted to the DT5 and DT6 Dirt Track models in the late 1920s and early 1930s. The engines had hemispherical heads and a short rigid forged crankshaft. They dominated dirt track racing for about three years. In 1929, the most successful dirt racing year, 1,200 Dirt Track motorcycles were sold.

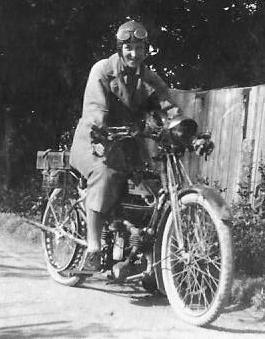
Doris Ogilvie on her Douglas 2¾ HP TT in Switzerland 1923

The Endeavour, a 494 cc (30.1 cu in) shaft drive model, was launched in 1934. This was again a flat-twin, but for the first time Douglas fitted it across the frame instead of in-line. Like other companies of the time, Douglas was struggling, and trying to diversify into other modes of transport. In 1935 it was taken over by the Bond Aircraft and Engineering Company (BAC).

Douglas continued motorcycle production in World War II, and diversified into making engines for generators. In 1948, shortly after the war, Douglas was in difficulty again, and reduced its output to the 350 cc flat twin models. The first of these, the T35, was unique in having swinging arm rear suspension with a longitudinal torsion bar.

The 1955 350 cc Douglas Dragonfly was the last model made. Its flat-twin engine is mounted with the cylinders across the frame, like the Endeavour of 1934. However, it has chain rear drive, rather than an arguably more suitable shaft drive.

The Westinghouse Brake and Signal Company Ltd bought Douglas out and production of Douglas Motorcycles ended in 1957. Douglas continued to import Vespa scooters into the UK, and later imported and assembled Gilera motorcycles.

Douglas gained significant attention in 1932–1933 when Robert Edison Fulton, Jr. became the first known man to circumnavigate the globe on a 6 hp Douglas twin fitted with automobile tyres. Fulton went on to write a book on his adventure titled "One Man Caravan".

== Cyclecar ==
Douglas
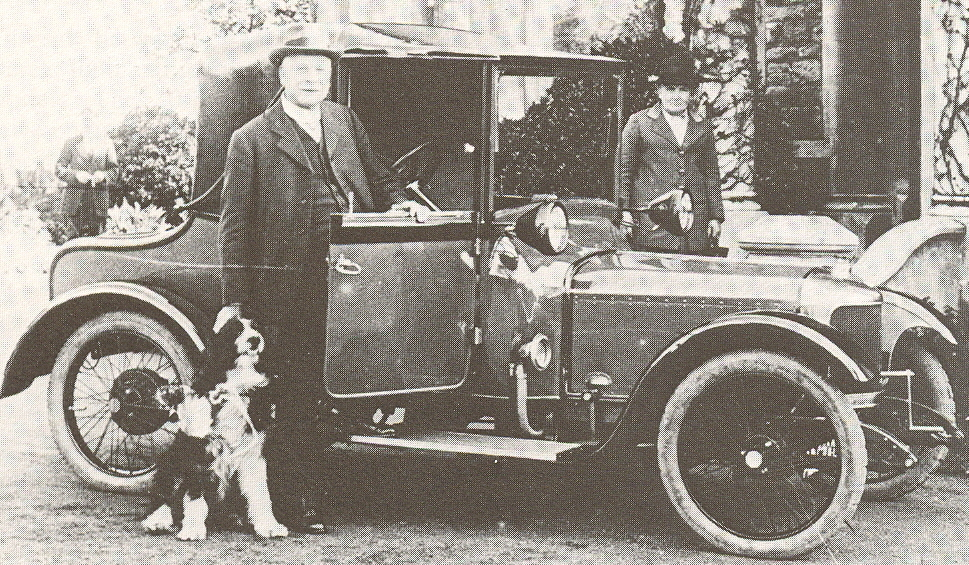
- 1919 Douglas cyclecar

Overview
- Manufacturer: Douglas Engineering Company
- Production: 9 hp: 1914–1916; 10.5 hp:1919–1922

Body and chassis
- Class: Cyclecar

Powertrain
- Engine: side-valve flat-twin engine 9 hp: 1,070 cc 10.5 hp: 1182 cc (1919), 1,224 cc (1919-1922)

Dimensions
- Wheelbase: 2,222.5 mm (87.5 in) (standard); 2,438.4 mm (96 in) (optional long wheelbase from 1919)
- Length: 3,048.0 mm (120 in)
- Width: 1,219.2 mm (48 in)
- Kerb weight: 432–508 kg (952–1,120 lb)

A version of Joseph Barter's horizontal twin cylinder engine of 1070 cc capacity, water cooled, was fitted to a two-seat cyclecar in 1913. It was better equipped than the average cyclecar of the era, with shaft drive from the front-mounted engine to the rear wheels, and was sold for £200. The rear suspension was unusual, with a horizontal coil spring mounted above the differential. The front had a beam axle and semi-elliptic leaf springing.

Car production was suspended during World War I. When it resumed in 1919, the engine was enlarged to 1224 cc, and the price was increased to £400, and then to £500. This proved to be too expensive, and sales dried up after a few hundred had been made. No original cars survive, but a replica using some original parts has been made.

== Motorcycle racing ==
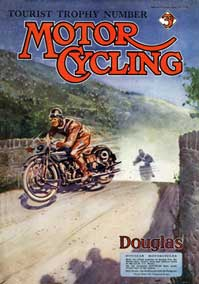
1926 magazine cover featuring a Douglas motorcycle in the Isle of Man TT

Douglas had some success in motorcycle racing and trials events. Twelve Douglas motorcycles were entered in both the Junior TT and Senior TT, and another three were in the Sidecar race during the 1923 TT. This gave Douglas its first senior Isle of Man TT victories. However, Douglas had previously won the Junior TT in 1912. Tom Sheard won the 500 cc Senior TT, and Douglas won the first ever Isle of Man sidecar race with Freddie Dixon while Jim Whalley had the fastest lap in the Senior TT with a time of just under 60 mph (97 km/h) during a wet race. A Douglas also placed third in the Junior TT that year. Later in 1923 Jim Whalley won the French Grand Prix, a distance of 288 miles (463 km), and another Douglas won the 1923 Durban-Johannesberg Marathon race; a remarkable achievement by Percy Flook on a 2.75 hp machine with an average 43 mph (69 km/h) for 430 miles (690 km). 1923 also saw Jim Whalley win the Spanish 12-hour race and Alec Bennett won the 1923 Welsh TT race. The late twenties saw success in Austria (1929 Austrian TT was won by Rudolph Runtsch) Post war the factory had little road racing success however a Mark 3 did win an outstanding victory in the 1950 Bemsee 'Silverstone Saturday' beating all the Velocettes, Nortons and BSA Gold Stars

Isle of Man TT Douglas profile summary										
Finishing Position	1	2	3	4	5	6	7	8	9	10
Number of times	4	2	3	4	3	4	5	2	3	1

== Influence on other manufacturers ==
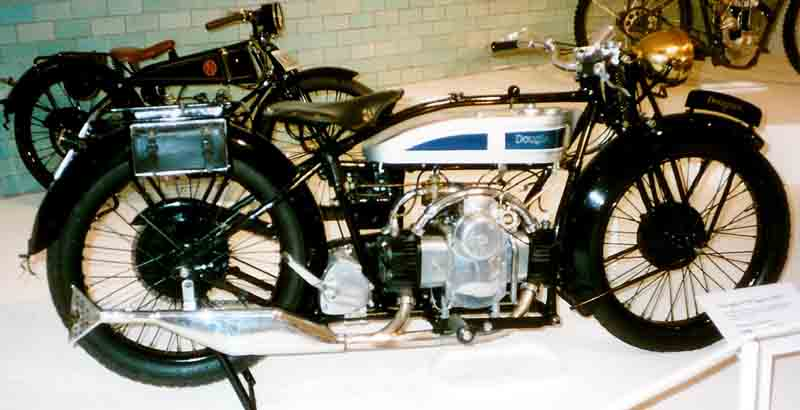
Douglas EW Sport 600 cc, 1927

Douglas's traditional layout of a flat-twin engine mounted with its cylinders parallel to the frame had been copied by several motorcycle manufacturers in the 1910s and 1920s. The Williamson Flat Twin, made in Coventry from 1912 to 1914, was a litre-class heavyweight motorcycle using the Douglas layout and with the engine, forks and gearbox made by Douglas. In the United States, Indian made its lightweight Model O from 1917 to 1919 and Harley-Davidson made its middleweight Model W from 1919 to 1923, both using the Douglas layout.

Several German manufacturers began making motorcycles with the Douglas layout when engine manufacturer BMW made its M2B15 flat-twin proprietary engine available in 1920. The M2B15 had been developed from the reverse engineering of a Douglas motorcycle engine.

== See also ==
- List of Douglas motorcycles
- List of car manufacturers of the United Kingdom
