= Sulby Glen railway station =

Former railway station in Isle of Man, UK

Sulby Glen Railway Station Stashoon Raad-Yiarn Glion Sulby
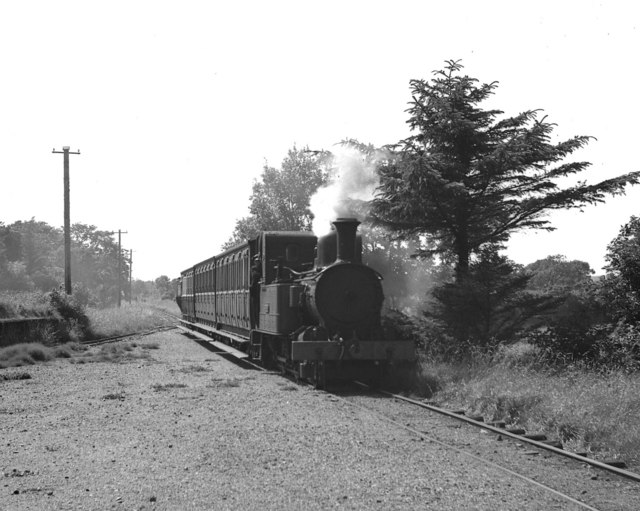

General information
- Location: Station Road, Sulby
- Coordinates: 54.319°N 4.491°W
- System: The Isle of Man Railway Co., Ltd. The Manx Northern Railway Co., Ltd.
- Owner: Isle of Man Railway Co.
- Line: North Line
- Platforms: One, Raised
- Tracks: One & Siding

Construction
- Structure type: Station & Goods Shed
- Parking: None Provided

History
- Opened: 23 September 1879
- Closed: 6 September 1968
- Rebuilt: 1903

Passengers
- Waiting Room / Toilets / Booking Hall
Location

Sulby Glen Railway Station (Manx: Stashoon Raad Yiarn Ghlion Sulby) was an intermediate station on the Manx Northern Railway, later owned and operated by the Isle of Man Railway Company from 1905; it served the village of Sulby in the Isle of Man and was an intermediate stopping place on a line that ran between St. John's and Ramsey. As the next stations on both sides were provided with passing loops, this station ran straight through; there was a gated level crossing at the northern extremity which was operated manually by station staff, the structure also serving as station masters' accommodation.

== Buildings ==

The original station building, built from corrugated iron at the time of opening, was later deemed to be too close to the running line, and was rebuilt at the turn of the twentieth century with a different style of building including a built-in canopy, making it unique in style among the Manx Northern Railway's stations, several of which were largely identical including those at Sulby Bridge, Ballaugh, Kirk Michael and St. Germain's, all of which except for Ballaugh remain in situ today and private residences. There was also a timber-built small goods shed at the southern end of the station.

== Today ==

The station was closed, along with all other stations on the line, in 1968 and later converted to a private dwelling. The former platform has had a wall added to make another room for the house, but the original structure and purpose can clearly be seen from the nearby footpath that follows the trackbed, the house is named Station House and carries a name plaque featuring a locomotive and the crest of the Manx Northern Railway as well as garden gates in a railway style. The former goods shed/store and this is also still extant.

== Route ==
Preceding station	Disused railways	Following station
Ballavolley Halt towards St. John's	Manx Northern Railway later Isle of Man Railway	Sulby Bridge towards Ramsey

== See also ==
- Isle of Man Railway stations
- Manx Northern Railway
- Sulby, Isle of Man
