= Ballaugh railway station =

Disused railway station in Isle of Man, UK

Ballaugh Railway Station Stashoon Raad-Yiarn Balley Ny Loghey

General information
- Location: Station Road, Ballaugh
- Coordinates: 54.310°N 4.541°W
- System: The Isle of Man Railway Co., Ltd. The Manx Northern Railway Co., Ltd.
- Owner: Isle of Man Railway Co.
- Platforms: Two, Ground Level
- Tracks: Two

History
- Opened: 23 September 1879
- Closed: 6 September 1968

Passengers
- Passenger / Livestock / Goods

Services
Waiting Room / Toilets / Booking Hall
Location

Ballaugh Railway Station (Manx: Stashoon Raad Yiarn Valley Ny Loghey) was a mandatory stopping place on the Manx Northern Railway that ran between St. John's and Ramsey in the Isle of Man. It opened when the line was opened and was later owned and operated by the Isle of Man Railway; it served the village of Ballaugh.

== Description ==
The building was erected for the opening of the railway although there is now little sign of it on the site; the station building itself was of similar construction to the ones at both Kirk Michael and Sulby Bridge but was demolished sometime after the railway closed. The station was opened in 1879 and remained open until the railway closed in 1968. Although the station building has been demolished the large stone-built goods shed remains, as does the goods platform, the former being under the care of the local heritage trust which periodically opens the shed to display a variety of railway items including railwayana and former signage which was once displayed at the station from private collections.

== Location ==
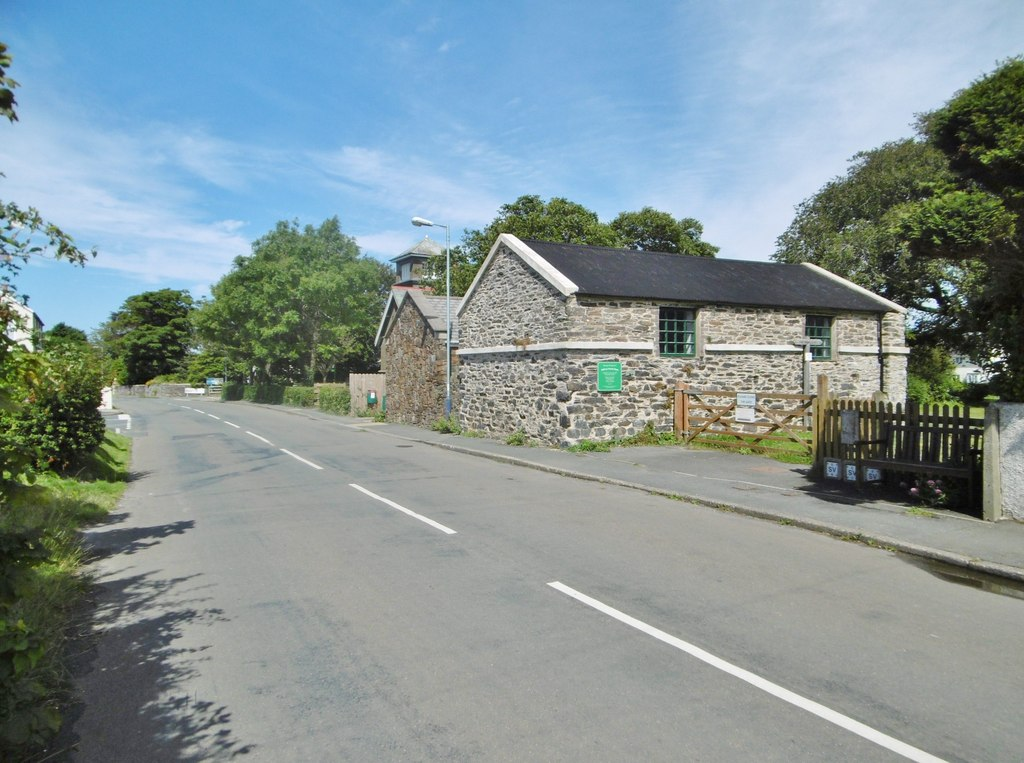
The goods shed which remains in situ and is home to the local heritage trust, viewed from Station Road.

The line itself crossed the main road from the village to Jurby - Station Road - and on the northerly side, there was once a modest goods yard, with cattle dock, and sidings; it was also unusual in having an especially long double passing loop, from which the sidings spurred and served the dock. The raised cattle dock is still visible (now an attractive feature with the "Millennium Stone" for the parish sitting centrally) along with a goods shed which is the headquarters of the Ballaugh Heritage Trust. Today the disused line is grassed over and is a popular footpath extending as far as Kirk Michael in the west and Lezayre in the east. The walking of dogs along this footpath is prohibited. The site of the 1879 station building (similar to those which remains at Sulby Bridge Station and Kirk Michael Station was demolished after closure and replaced with a modern bungalow.

== Route ==
| Preceding station | Disused railways | Following station |
|---|---|---|
| Bishop's Court towards St. John's | Manx Northern Railway later Isle Of Man Railway | Ballavolley Halt towards Ramsey |

== See also ==
- Isle of Man Railway stations
- Manx Northern Railway
- Ballaugh

== Sources ==
- [Isle of Man Steam Railway Supporters' Association]
- Subterranea Britannica - Ballaugh Station
