= Gob-y-Deigan railway station =

Former railway station in Isle of Man, UK

Gob-Y-Deigan Gob-Y-Deigan
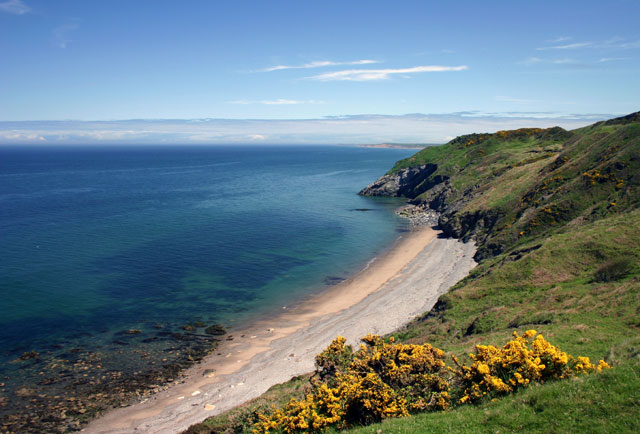

General information
- Location: Patrick, Isle of Man
- Coordinates: 54.253°N 4.633°W
- System: The Isle of Man Railway Co., Ltd. The Manx Northern Railway Co., Ltd.
- Owner: Isle of Man Railway Co.
- Platforms: One, Ground Level
- Tracks: One, Running Line

Construction
- Structure type: Timber Shelter
- Parking: None Provided

History
- Opened: 13 July 1887
- Closed: late 1887?
- Former names: Manx Northern Railway Co.

Passengers
- Passenger Only

Services
Shelter
Location

Gob-Y-Deigan Railway Station (Manx: Stashoon Raad Yiarn Ghob-Y-Deigan) was a station on the Manx Northern Railway, later owned and operated by the Isle of Man Railway; it served a beach near Kirk Michael in the Isle of Man and was an intermediate stopping place on a line that ran between St. John's and Ramsey.

== Description and history ==
The exposed coastal section of the Manx Northern Railway between Peel Road and Glen Mooar viaduct was served by a small halt in the very early days of the railway. This section of line caused the railway company headaches over many years owing to subsidence which was regularly rectified by the dumping of used locomotive ash along the sides of the running line. This area is also cited as the reason for the railway acquiring a turntable to turn only the coaches, to equalise the weathering of paintwork at this exposed point. Today the trackbed is walkable and it has sunk even further. The halt was only short-lived and built to serve excursions for picnickers. It had no road access but did offer a basic waiting shelter, which survived in use as a lineside hut until the closure of the railway.

== Route ==
Preceding station	Disused railways	Following station
St. Germain's towards St. John's	Manx Northern Railway later Isle of Man Railway	West Berk towards Ramsey

== See also ==
- Isle of Man Railway stations
- Manx Northern Railway
