= West Berk railway station =

Railway station in Isle of Man, the UK

West Berk Berk Heear

General information
- Coordinates: 54.27132°N 4.59981°W
- System: The Isle of Man Railway Co., Ltd. The Manx Northern Railway Co., Ltd.
- Owner: Isle of Man Railway Co.
- Line: North Line
- Platforms: One, Ground Level
- Tracks: One, Running Line

Construction
- Structure type: Crossing Lodge
- Parking: None Provided

History
- Opened: 1914?
- Closed: 1914?
- Former names: Manx Northern Railway Co.

Passengers
- Passenger Only

Services
None Provided
Location

West Berk Railway Station (Manx: Stashoon Raad Yiarn Berk Heear) was a station on the Manx Northern Railway, later owned and operated by the Isle of Man Railway; it served a small area near Kirk Michael in the Isle of Man and was an intermediate stopping place on a line that ran between St. John's and Ramsey.

== Description and history ==
The halt was only short-lived and, while recorded in MNR documents, its exact location is not known for certain other than as being adjacent to a level crossing.

== Route ==
Preceding station	Disused railways	Following station
Gob-Y-Deigan towards St. John's	Manx Northern Railway later Isle of Man Railway	Kirk Michael towards Ramsey

== See also ==
- Isle of Man Railway stations
- Manx Northern Railway
