= Sulby Bridge railway station =

Former railway station in Isle of Man, UK

Coordinates: 54.324°N 4.472°W

Sulby Bridge Droghad Sulby

General information
- Location: Station Approach, Sulby, Isle of Man
- System: The Isle of Man Railway Co., Ltd. The Manx Northern Railway Co., Ltd.
- Platforms: 2

History
- Opened: 23 September 1879
- Closed: 6 September 1968
Location

Sulby Bridge Railway Station (Manx: Stashoon Raad Yiarn Droghad Sulby) was a station on the Manx Northern Railway (MNR), later owned and operated by the Isle of Man Railway; it served the village of Sulby in the Isle of Man and was an intermediate stopping place on a line that ran between St. John's and Ramsey.

== Description and history ==
Sulby Bridge station was opened at the same time as the MNR's St. John's to Ramsey line on 23 September 1879. The station was provided with a sandstone building, in the same style as those at Kirk Michael and Ballaugh, and is still extant as a private residence. The station served the village of Sulby, as did nearby Sulby Glen railway station, but also had a long passing loop and, until the early 1960s, a goods siding.

== Later years ==
The station and line were closed on 13 November 1965 but reopened on 3 June 1967. The station finally lost its passenger service, along with all the other stations on the St John's to Ramsey line, on 6 September 1968. The line through the station remained open for a service of oil tanks until October 1969, when the line was finally closed.

The rails were lifted in 1974 and the trackbed is now a public right of way. Nothing remains of the station site today and the area has been redeveloped.

== Route ==
| Preceding station | Disused railways | Following station |
|---|---|---|
| Sulby Glen towards St. John's | Manx Northern Railway later Isle of Man Railway | Lezayre towards Ramsey |

== See also ==
- Isle of Man Railway stations
- Manx Northern Railway
- Sulby

== Sources ==
- [Isle of Man Steam Railway Supporters' Association]
