= Bishop's Court railway station =

Disused railway station in Isle of Man, UK

Bishop's Court Cooyrt Yn Aspick
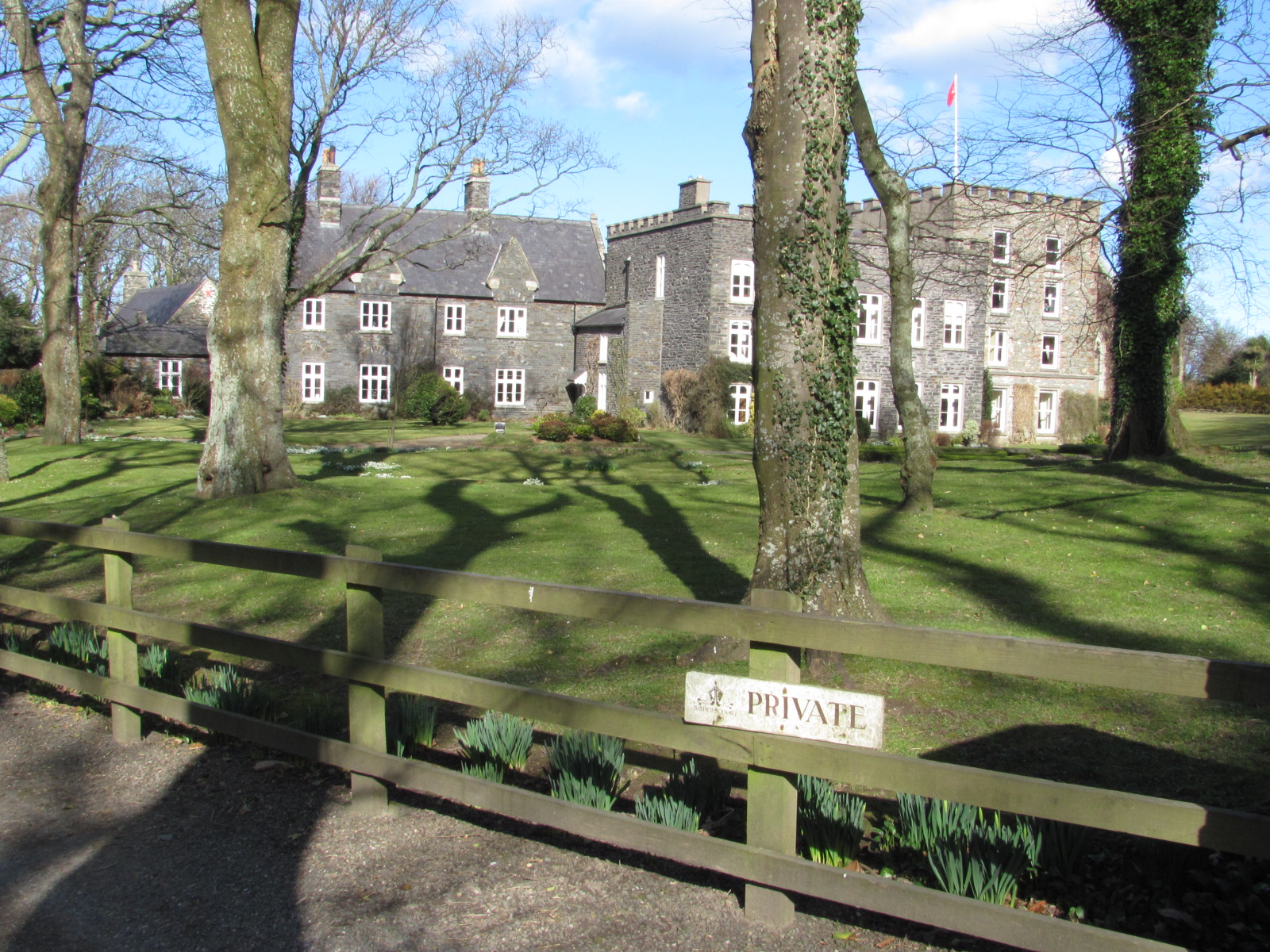
- Former Bishop's residence

General information
- Location: Off Ramsey Road, Patrick.
- Coordinates: 54°18′13″N 4°34′13″W
- System: The Isle of Man Railway Co., Ltd. The Manx Northern Railway Co., Ltd.
- Owner: Isle of Man Railway Co.
- Line: The Ramsey Line
- Platforms: One, Ground Level
- Tracks: One, Running Line

Construction
- Structure type: None
- Parking: None Provided

History
- Opened: See Text
- Closed: 1950
- Former names: Manx Northern Railway Co.

Passengers
- Passenger Only (Limited)

Services
Waiting Bench
Location

Bishop's Court Halt (Manx: Staad Chooyrt Yn Aspick) was a station on the Manx Northern Railway, later owned and operated by the Isle of Man Railway; it served the residence of the local bishop in the Isle of Man and was a stopping place on a line that ran between St. John's and Ramsey.

== Description and history ==
The halt was built to serve the nearby estate of Bishop's Court, the home of the Bishop of Sodor and Man for the use of the bishop, his staff and visitors. The halt was marked only by a bench and some steps leading down from the estate.

== Dates ==
The opening date of the halt is not recorded although it probably dates from the opening of the line (23 September 1879). The halt never appeared in the public timetable and saw only limited use which is well documented in The Isle of Man Railway by James I.C. Boyd (Oakwood Press, 1962).

== Usage ==
Although originally intended as a private station, it was opened to the public between 23 September 1930 and 3 March 1935 and referred to as Bishopscourt Halt. A hand-operated signal was installed at the site which was operated by the bishop and his guests and staff in order to halt trains for them to board; the guard needed to be informed if someone wanted to alight. After 1935 it was only occasionally used as a private halt until closed in 1950.

== Route ==
Preceding station	Disused railways	Following station
Kirk Michael towards St. John's	Manx Northern Railway later Isle of Man Railway	Ballaugh towards Ramsey

== See also ==
- Isle of Man Railway stations
- Manx Northern Railway

== Sources ==
- Isle of Man Steam Railway Supporters' Association
