= Lezayre railway station =

Railway station in Isle of Man, UK

Lezayre Railway Station Stashoon Raad-Yiarn Creest ny h-Ayrey
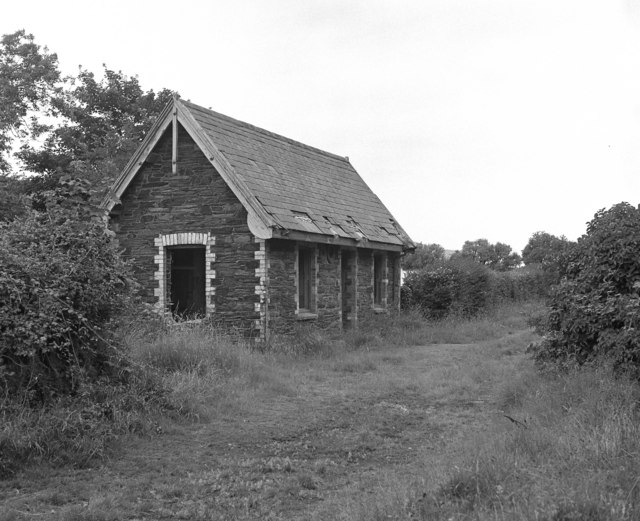

General information
- Location: Garey Road, Lezayre.
- Coordinates: 54.325°N 4.429°W
- System: The Isle of Man Railway Co., Ltd. The Manx Northern Railway Co., Ltd.
- Owner: Isle of Man Railway Co.
- Line: North Line
- Platforms: One, Ground Level
- Tracks: One Running Line

Construction
- Structure type: Station House

History
- Opened: 23 September 1879
- Closed: 31 October 1958

Passengers
- Passenger / Goods / Freight

Services
Booking Facilities / Waiting Area
Location

Lezayre Railway Station (Manx: Stashoon Raad Yiarn Chreest ny h-Ayrey) was an intermediate stopping place on the Manx Northern Railway, a line that ran between St. John's and Ramsey in the Isle of Man. It was the first halt outside the terminus at Ramsey. It was later owned and operated by the Isle of Man Railway. It served the small village known as Churchtown centred on the parish church, Kirk Christ Lezayre.

== Route ==
Preceding station	Disused railways	Following station
Sulby Bridge towards St. John's	Manx Northern Railway later Isle of Man Railway	Ramsey (Terminus)

== History ==
The station was situated about 1.75 miles (2.82 km) west of Ramsey, and served the small village of Churchtown in the parish of Lezayre. It was opened as an original stopping place on the Manx Northern Railway's St. John's to Ramsey line on 23 September 1879. The station was provided with a distinctive tall-gabled stone building with brick quoins, which was also used by the level crossing keeper. No raised platform or passing loop were provided; the track was ballasted up to rail level in a similar fashion to other stations on the line. It was a staffed station in the early years of the line, although it was one of the quietest on the whole network owing to its tiny catchment area. It was downgraded to a request stop as early as 1908. It was removed from the timetable from 1950, although trains continued to call there and tickets were available. The station was finally closed officially in 1958, although one could still alight there by unofficial arrangement with the train crew. Goods facilities were minimal; a siding was provided from 1884 until 1926.

== Later years ==
Passenger services ceased altogether on 13 November 1965, when the whole network closed down. The line and the station were re-opened on 3 June 1967 under the auspices of the Marquess of Ailsa, but this stay of execution proved to be short-lived when the passenger service was withdrawn for the final time on 6 September 1968. The line through the station remained open for a short period to accommodate a freight service of oil tanks until October 1969, when the Ramsey line was finally closed. The track was lifted in 1974 but the building remained, in derelict condition, for several years.

== After closure ==
After the line closed, the station building spent a number of years in a derelict condition, before being fully restored as a private dwelling. It was then owned by a local enthusiast who installed a small section of rail to denote the building's origins, the railway having long since disappeared. Today the trackbed to the side of the station structure forms part of a heritage trail which can be accessed via the road which once crossed the railway at this point. The road between the station and the village crosses the river Sulby by means of Garey Ford, which was in the news in October 2017 when a vehicle was swept into the river by the current.

== Recreation ==
The various stations on the South Line displayed station signs commemorating "corresponding" closed stations on the North Line as part of the 2015 Manx Heritage Transport Festival. A "Lezayre" sign was displayed at Port St.Mary Station for the event, being the first station from the terminus at Port Erin Station as with Lezayre and Ramsey.

== See also ==
- Isle of Man Railway stations
- Manx Northern Railway
- Ramsey
- Lezayre

== Sources ==
- [Isle of Man Steam Railway Supporters' Association]
