= Manx Northern Railway =

Railway on the Isle of Man, UK

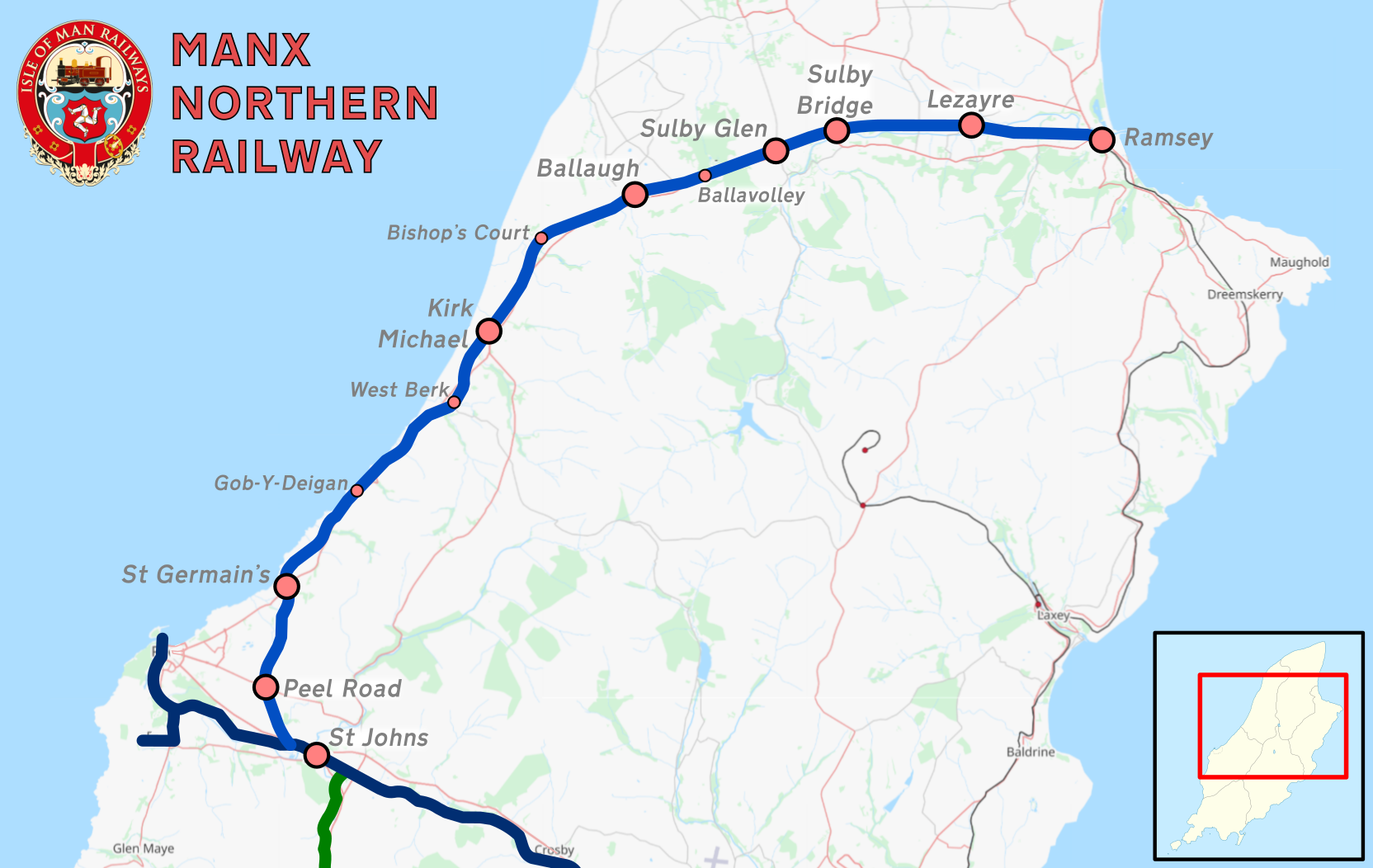
Route map (Click to expand)

The Manx Northern Railway (MNR) was the second common carrier railway built in the Isle of Man. It was a steam railway between St John's and Ramsey. It operated as an independent concern only from 1879 to 1905.

== History ==
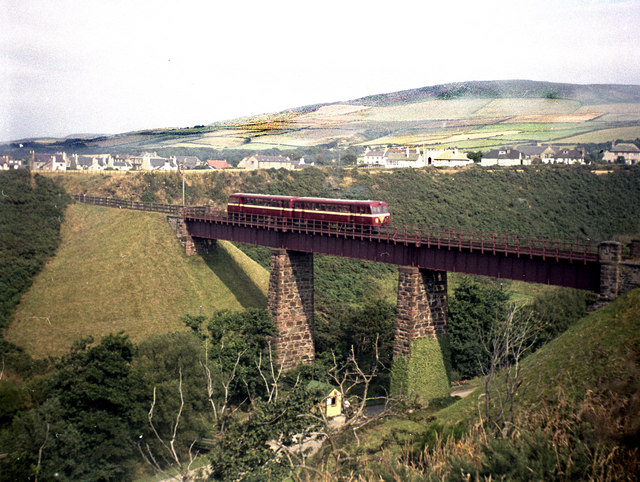
Diesel cars Nos. 19 and 20 cross Glen Wyllin viaduct with a service to Ramsey in August 1964

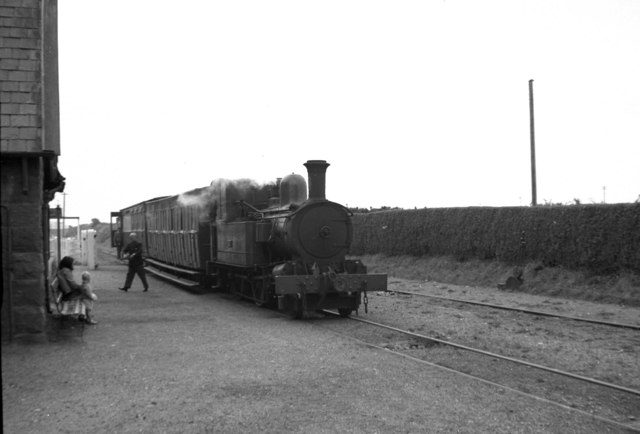
Ramsey-bound train at Kirk Michael

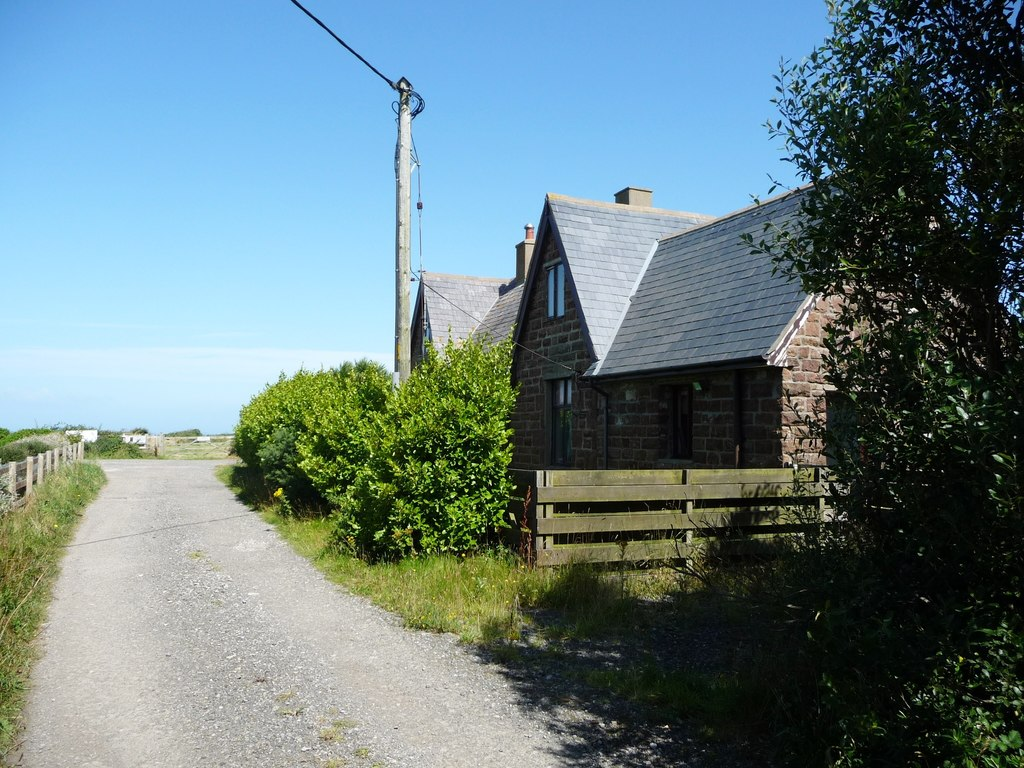
St. Germain's Station long after closure, now a private residence

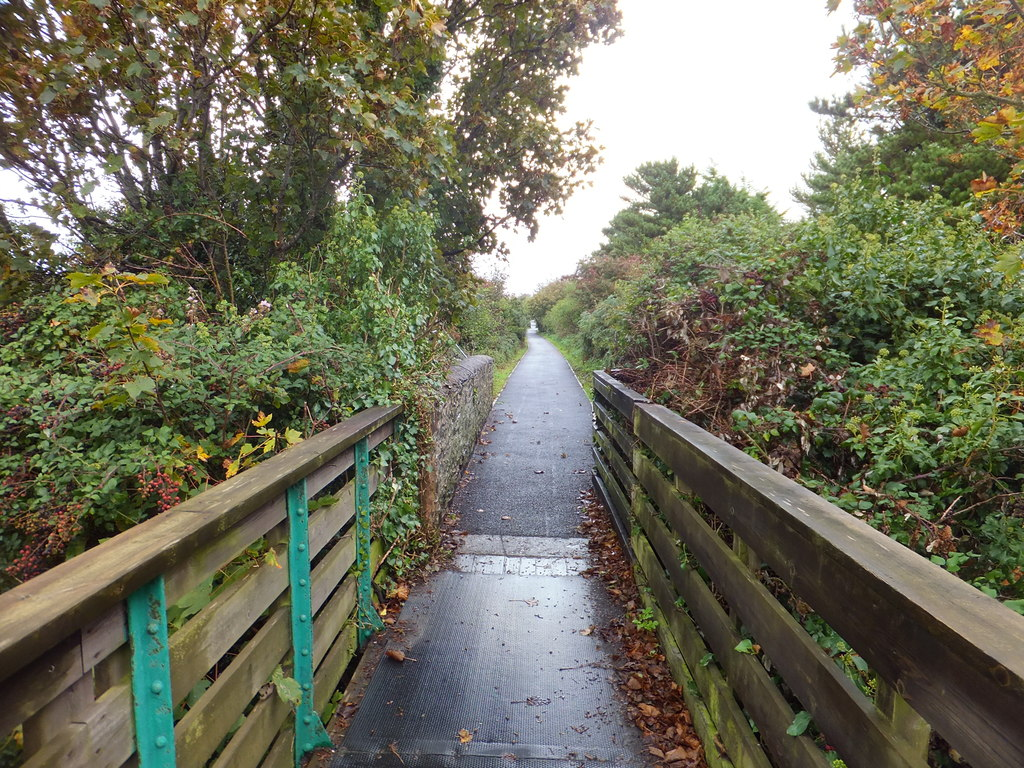
Trackbed of the Manx Northern Railway, now a footpath

When the people in the town of Ramsey realised their town was not going to be incorporated into the newly promoted Isle of Man Railway (IOMR) network in the 1870s it was left to them to promote their own railway as a link with the rest of the island. The rugged geography of the east coast forced the Manx Northern Railway into an indirect route: first westwards to Kirk Michael and then south to St John's where a junction could be made with the Isle of Man Railway's Peel to Douglas line which opened in 1873.

Built to a common Manx gauge, a 3 ft (914 mm) narrow gauge, construction began in 1878 and the railway opened for business without formality on 23 September 1879. It was operated by the Isle of Man Railway until 6 November 1880 when the MNR took over the responsibility. In 1881, passenger services started operating through to Douglas using running rights over the tracks of the Isle of Man Railway.

Some significant engineering works were required on the west coast section of the line, including the bridging of Glen Wyllin (at Kirk Michael) and the nearby Glen Mooar. An embankment high on the cliffs south of Glen Mooar, the "Donkey Bank", was an unending maintenance problem and a drain upon the line's profitability. To try to stabilise the track, this section was the only part of the Manx railways to have its rails mounted in chairs. The rest of the system had the rails directly spiked to the sleepers.

Between Kirk Michael and Ballaugh, the MNR had a halt purely for the use of the Bishop of Sodor and Man at Bishop's Court. A simple wooden bench comprised the station's entire facilities.

The northern part of the line was flat compared to the western coastal section, and had numerous hand-worked level crossings. These were so close together in places that the protecting signals for one crossing stood beside the previous crossing up the line. A distinctive lattice girder bridge, the "basket bridge", was built over the Sulby River near Ramsey. It was renewed in 1914.

The MNR had the only dockside track on the railway system, allowing direct transfer between the railway and sea-going vessels. This line, at Ramsey, opened in 1883 and closed in 1952. Various schemes to emulate this in Douglas were often proposed but the work was never undertaken.

=== Post-amalgamation ===
The Manx Northern Railway was not independent for long. In 1905, it became part of the Isle of Man Railway Company when that company took over the operation of the entire system, nearly 47 miles (76 km) of track. A depression in the mining industry resulted in the closure of the Foxdale Mines in 1911 with the resultant loss of traffic. Services to Foxdale ceased in 1940 but the odd ballast train continued to collect mine waste up to the early 1960s. The Ramsey route had a brief boom between the wars and after World War II, but then, in line with the rest of the system, patronage sharply declined. The whole railway system reached a crisis in 1966 when no services operated. After a brief revival when the system was leased by the Marquess of Ailsa, the rest of the former Manx Northern Railway closed for 1968 along with the original IOMR Douglas-Peel line. One of the last services was the transport of fuel oil from the electricity generating station at Peel to the one at Ramsey, for which a special siding was laid. The last oil train ran in April 1969. The track was lifted in 1974 and the Glen Wyllin and Glen Mooar viaducts were dismantled in 1975. The majority of the six-wheeled coaching stock was also lost at this time, having been stored out of use for many years on a siding at St John's station in the open air.

== Stations ==
=== Main line ===
Point	Coordinates (Links to map resources)	OS Grid Ref	Notes
Ramsey station	54.322°N 4.387°W	SC44859445	
Lezayre	54.325°N 4.429°W	SC42139487	
Sulby Bridge	54.324°N 4.472°W	SC39339486	
Sulby Glen	54.319°N 4.491°W	SC38079435	
Ballavolley Halt	54.315°N 4.517°W	SC36369396	
Ballaugh	54.31°N 4.541°W	SC34789346	
Bishop's Court	54.3036°N 4.5703°W	SC32859282	
Kirk Michael	54.284°N 4.587°W	SC31699068	
West Berk	54.2713°N 4.5998°W	SC30808930	
Gob-y-Deigan	54.253°N 4.633°W	SC28568734	
St. Germain's	54.236°N 4.654°W	SC27128550	
Peel Road	54.215°N 4.66°W	SC26658318	
St John's	54.2012°N 4.6415°W	SC27798160	

=== Foxdale branch ===
Point	Coordinates (Links to map resources)	OS Grid Ref	Notes
St John's	54.2012°N 4.6415°W	SC27798160	
Waterfall	54.18°N 4.642°W	SC27677924	
Foxdale	54.17°N 4.636°W	SC28027812	

== Branches ==
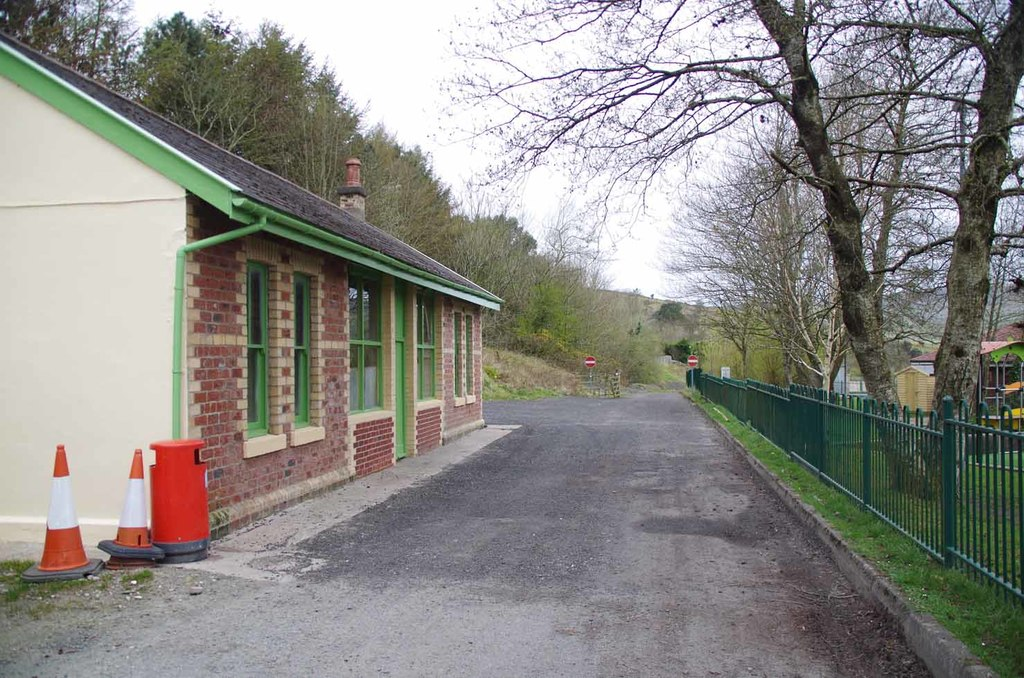
The former Foxdale Station, which is now restored and home to the local heritage trust

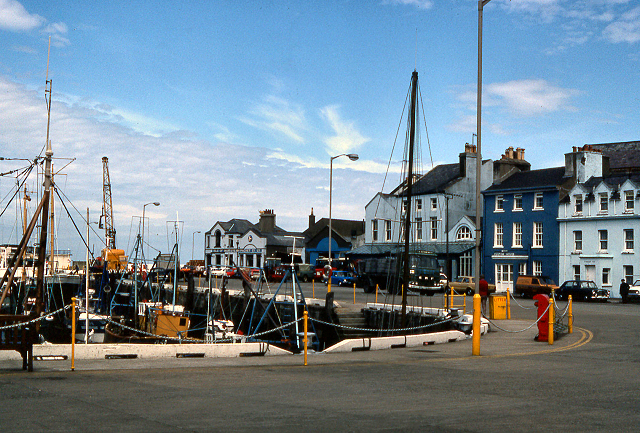
Ramsey east quay in recent time showing the former extent of the harbourside line

=== Foxdale Railway ===
A separate undertaking, the Foxdale Railway, was promoted by the MNR and worked by them from opening in 1886. This line branched southwards from St John's and allowed lead and silver ores from the mines at Foxdale to be delivered directly to the dock side in Ramsey. It operated between 188 and 1940 though stock movements were recorded as late and 1960, the line was lifted by 1965.

=== Milntown Spur ===
The Milntown Spur (54.321°N 4.382°W) was a short 3 ft (914 mm) narrow gauge spur off the ex-Manx Northern line just south of the terminus at Ramsey, Isle of Man. It was constructed only in the final year of operation for the purposes of transporting fuel oil from Peel to Ramsey by rail. The siding was a direct spur off the main line and was on a very tight curve directly into the yard that it served. Short-lived, it did however have the distinction of being the reason for one of the last trains to travel over the line in April 1969 prior to lifting.

=== Quayside Tramway ===
A spur from Ramsey Station served the town's harbour and ran for nearly 1-mile (1.6 km) along the quay at various lengths over the years, and included small sidings to serve vessels.

=== Poortown Spur ===
A short line north of Peel Road Station which served a smaller gauge tramway operated by the nearby quarry from which tipper wagons were loaded from a high wall into open wagons; remnants of the high wall remain today.

== Locomotives ==
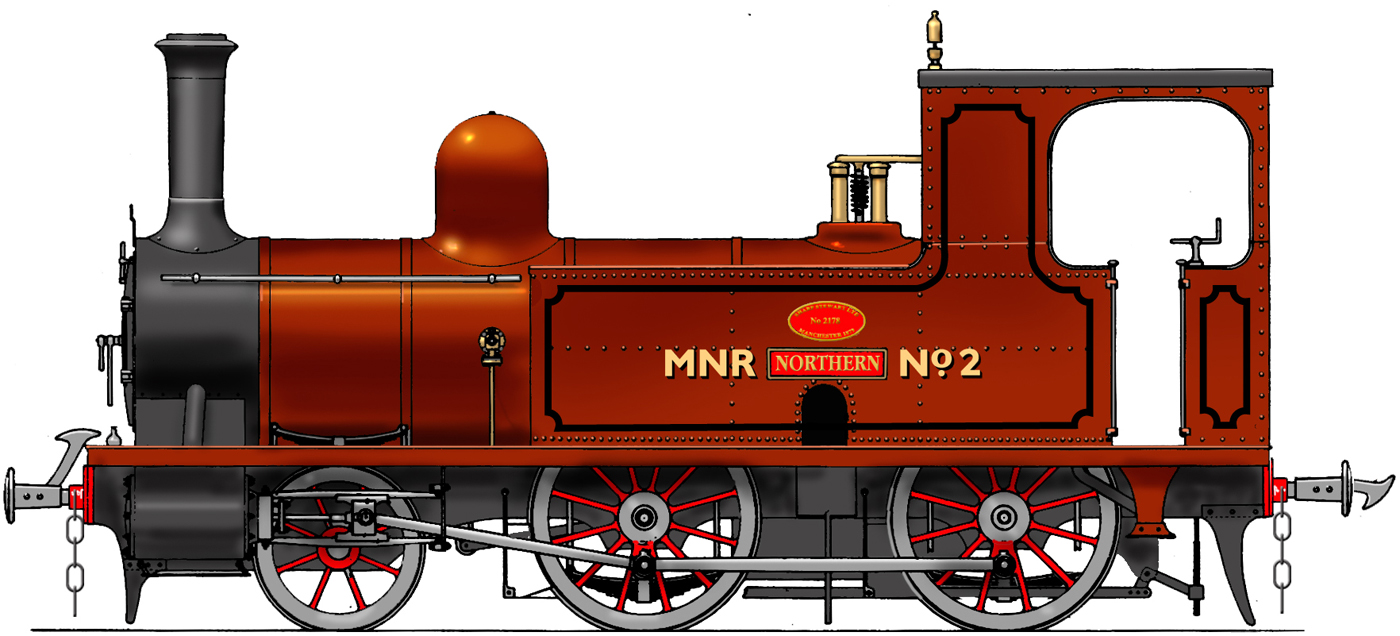
M.N.Ry. No.2 Northern was one of two locomotives supplied by Sharp, Stewart & Company for the opening of the line in 1879 (the other being M.N.Ry. No.1 Ramsey); both have been scrapped.

Two 2-4-0 side tank locomotives were ordered from Sharp, Stewart & Company for the opening of the line. Numbered 1 and 2, they were named Ramsey and Northern respectively. In 1880, the MNR acquired a third locomotive from Beyer, Peacock & Company, Manchester to a design similar to those used on the Isle of Man Railway. Given the number 3 and named Thornhill, it was built alongside the IOMR's engine number 7 – Tynwald – in Beyer, Peacock's Manchester works. In 1885 it was realised that a much more powerful locomotive was required for working the mineral traffic on the Foxdale Railway. This time they turned to Dübs & Company, Glasgow for an 0-6-0 tank locomotive. This powerful engine, numbered 4, bore the name Caledonia. When they were taken into IOMR stock, they were renumbered as a continuation of the then IOMR series. Thornhill became number 14 and Caledonia became number 15. Ramsey and Northern were allocated numbers 16 and 17 respectively but never bore them in service. After very little use by the IOMR they were scrapped in 1923 and 1912.

== Passenger stock ==
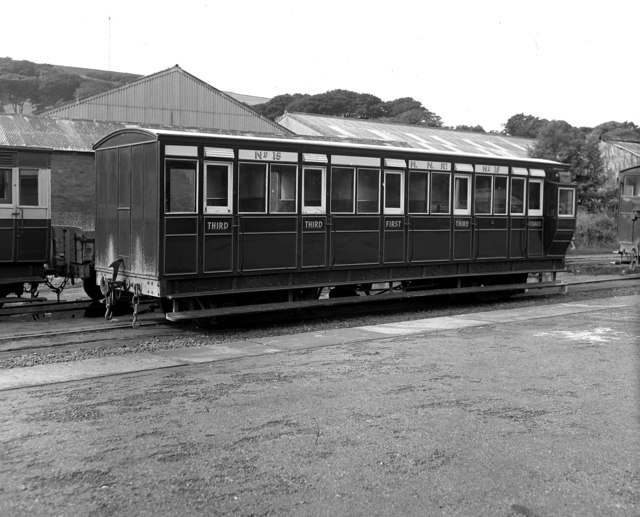
The Foxdale Coach as restored for the line's centenary in 1979 in the yard at Douglas Station; it remains in use today and was restored in 2013 and 2022.

For the opening of passenger services, the Manx Northern Railway ordered fourteen six-wheeled coaches built to the Cleminson system, a first on the island and using a complex system of six-wheeled arrangement whereby the middle set were not fixed. This arrangement allowed the outer wheels to pivot and the centre pair to slide from side to side, thus allowing the coaches to negotiate tight curves more easily than a rigid wheelbase. Expensively constructed, they proved to be troublesome in traffic, so much so that after the amalgamation with the Isle of Man Railway Company they saw little further service, occasionally being used for school traffic. A number of examples survive in preservation (see below). For the Foxdale branch a special bogie coach with enhanced braking capabilities was constructed by the Oldbury Carriage & Wagon Company in 1886. It was a composite coach with a guard's compartment, three third class compartments and one first class compartment specially for the Foxdale Mines’ Captain. To celebrate the centenary of the Manx Northern Railway in 1979, the coach was restored to its original livery. which it carried until 2001 when it reverted to the standard livery of red and cream. It remains in regular service today. Almost all of the original non-passenger stock was lost, with only one closed van surviving today (Gr.12) which was rebuilt in 2001.

== Survivors ==
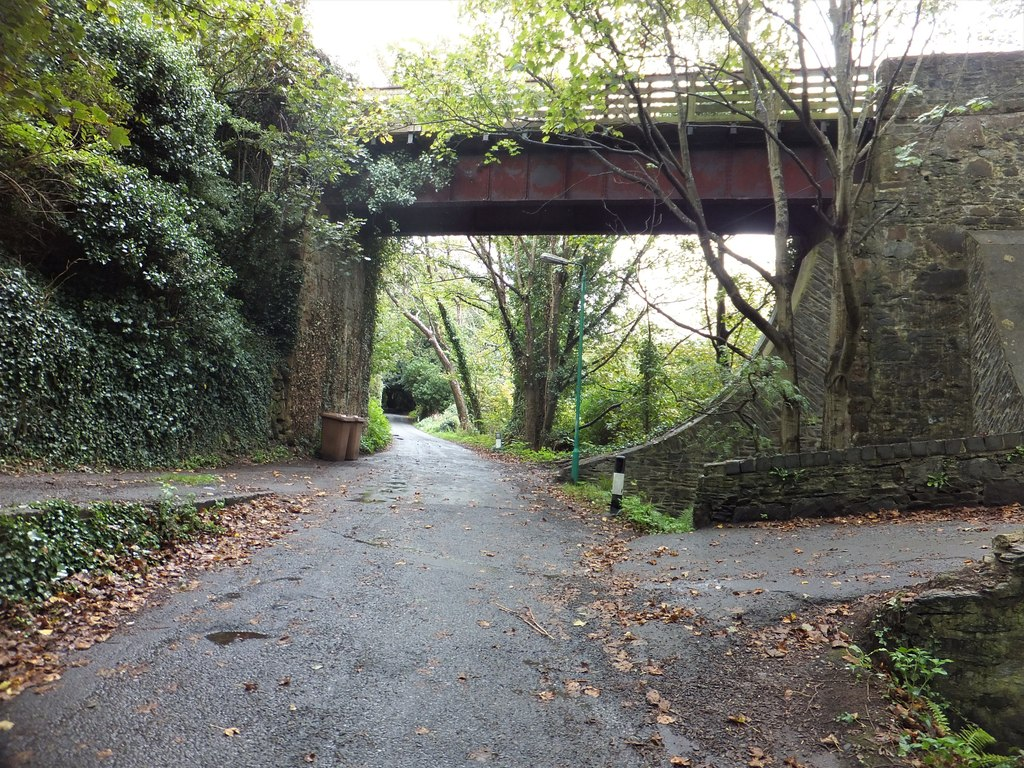
Balleira Bridge which is of an unusual design, is north of Kirk Michael and remains in situ today along with several other such structures on the line, notably stanchions at Glen Wyllin

M.N.Ry. No. 4 Caledonia was restored in 1994 to take part in the Snaefell Mountain Railway centenary celebrations and remains in regular operation today.

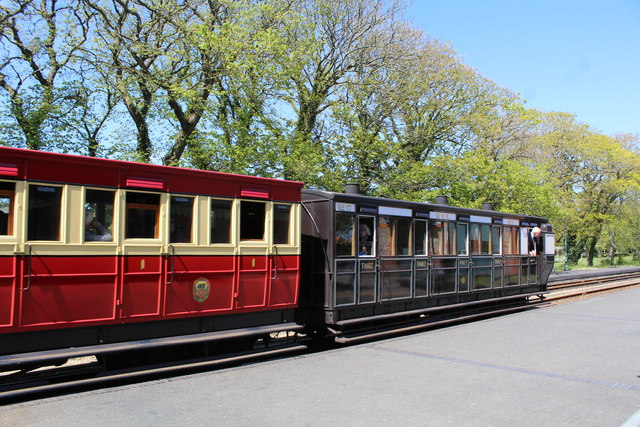
Foxdale Coach (M.N.Ry. No.17) has been restored to original condition, seen here at Castletown Station in 2017.

=== Structures ===
Today, many of the station buildings along the line survive and have been converted to form a variety of uses including a village fire station, several private dwellings and museum displays. There are no railway structures remaining at Ramsey but buildings do survive at Lezayre, Sulby Glen, Sulby Bridge, Ballaugh (goods shed only), Kirk Michael and St. Germain's as well as remnants of the viaducts at Glen Wyllin and Glen Mooar and a number of level crossing lodges at Orrisdale (No.1 & No.2), West Berk and Ballavolley. Several under and over bridges also remain as the trackbed now forms a footpath and bridleway.

=== Locomotives ===
Of the locomotives, No.3 Thornhill is in private preservation in the north of the island having been purchased in 1978 and removed from the railway; M.N.Ry. No.4 Caledonia was returned service in 1995 and remains in sporadic service, commonly on the Ultimate Driving Experience days and dining services, whilst the first two locomotives built by Sharp, Stewart & Company, M.N.Ry. No.1 Ramsey and M.N.Ry. No.2 Northern did not survive. A similar replica locomotive exists on the Southwold Railway named Blyth though this example is notably smaller than its Manx descendents.

=== Stock ===
Several of the unusual six-wheeled carriages survive with one accompanying M.N.Ry. No.3 Thornhill in private ownership and two on the railway: one without its running gear and another in private ownership having spent 1976–1998 in the Isle of Man Railway Museum at Port Erin Station which is now off-island. Two further examples of six-wheeled stock survive off-island in a private collection, and the sole two bogie carriages built in 1899 by Hurst-Nelson also remain in existence. The unique Foxdale Coach survives in regular traffic on the south line having been restored in 1979, 2012 and 2023, and a goods Van Gr. 12 which was rebuilt in 1997 and remains on the line, withdrawn in 2023 when it was replaced by restored Van G.1. As part of the annual transport festival a genuine Manx Northern Train has operated in recent times.

=== Other ===
Many smaller items survive in use on the railway today, such as signal levers and various point levers inherited in 1905 and transferred around the system. Notably, levers provided by Stevens & Son of Glasgow remain in use on the south line and are all originally from the Manx Northern Railway. A number of pre-merger tickets also remain and these are highly collectible, having last been printed in 1905; the lower numbered examples to more obscure halts are particularly valuable to collectors and appear on auction sites occasionally.

== See also ==
- Isle of Man Railway
- Locomotives
- Other Stations
- Level Crossings
- Transport on the Isle of Man
- Heritage railways in the Isle of Man
- British Narrow Gauge
- Ramsey
- Manx Electric Railway
- Foxdale Railway

== Gallery ==
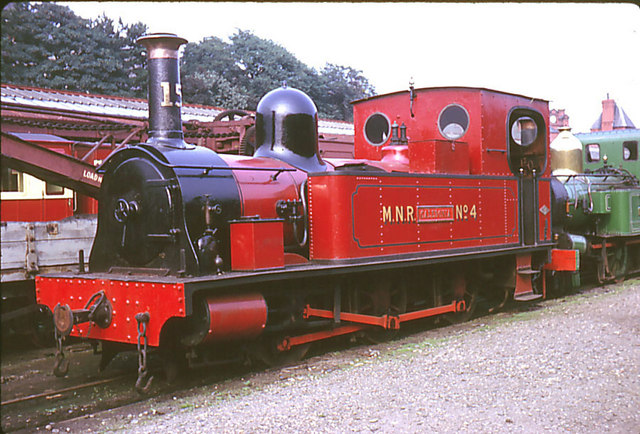
MNR No. 4 Caledonia now IOMR No. 15

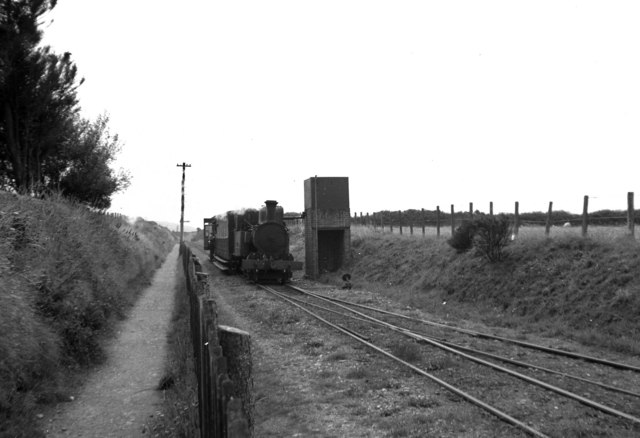
Locomotive taking water, Kirk Michael station, Isle of Man

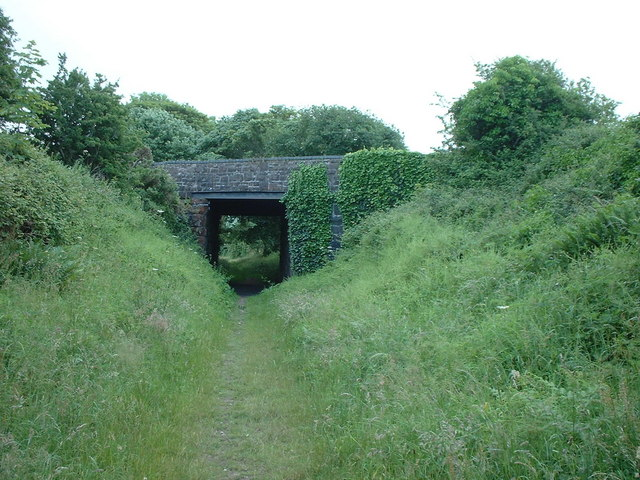
Former railway bridge at Poortown (Peel Road). The trackbed is now a footpath.

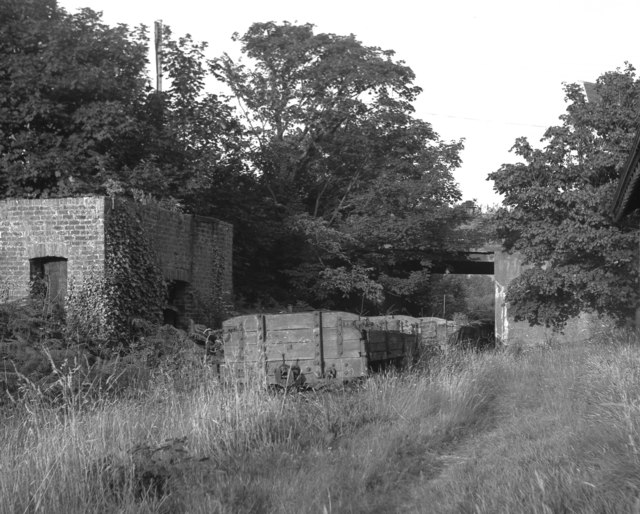
Derelict goods wagons at St Johns (Foxdale Railway) Station
