= Sulby, Isle of Man =

Village on the Isle of Man, Britain

Coordinates: 54.319°N 4.490°W

Sulby: Manx: Sulby
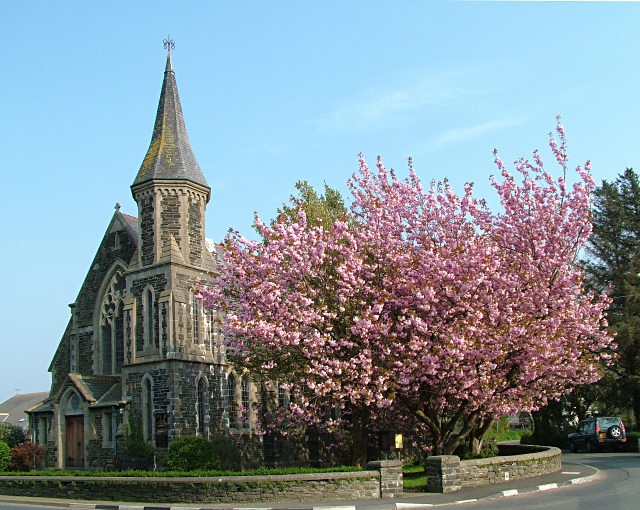
- Sulby Methodist Church, A14 Sulby Crossroads

- Location within the Isle of Man
- Population: (2006 Census)
- OS grid reference: SC380944
- Parish: Lezayre
- Sheading: Ayre
- Crown dependency: Isle of Man
- Post town: ISLE OF MAN
- Postcode district: IM7
- Dialling code: 01624
- Police: Isle of Man
- Fire: Isle of Man
- Ambulance: Isle of Man
- House of Keys: Ayre

Sulby (locally /ˈsðlbiːˈ/; Manx: Sulby) is a village in the Isle of Man. It is 4 miles from Ramsey and is located in the parish of Kirk Christ Lezayre on the A3 Castletown road.

== Location ==
Historically containing the Treen of the Curragh of Kirk Christ Lezayre and the Land of the Monks of Myrosco, the village is situated at the southern edge of the island's northern alluvial plain; north of the island's northern hills; at the point where the Sulby River emerges from those hills.

The old part of Sulby is situated at the junction between the A14 Tholt-y-Will Road and the B9 Claddagh Road (grid reference SC382940). This part of Sulby has a mill and a village green. The main part of the village is situated along the main A3 road between Close-e-Volley and Ginger Hall, centred on its junction with the A14.

== Name ==
The name Sulby (Old Norse: Sóla-ɓør) ('Soli's farm')), or Súla + bý (farm of the cleft) reflects the Scandinavian influence in Isle of Man place-names.

== Facilities ==
Sulby has a primary school, a hotel and a large campsite in the river meadow of Sulby Claddagh. It also has a post office, general stores, an inn, a Methodist church, and an Anglican church. The village is dominated by the Sulby River, the Ballamanaugh farm estate, common land of the Claddagh and Cronk (hill) Sumark, which includes the remains of a fort from the Iron Age.

== Motor-Sport heritage ==
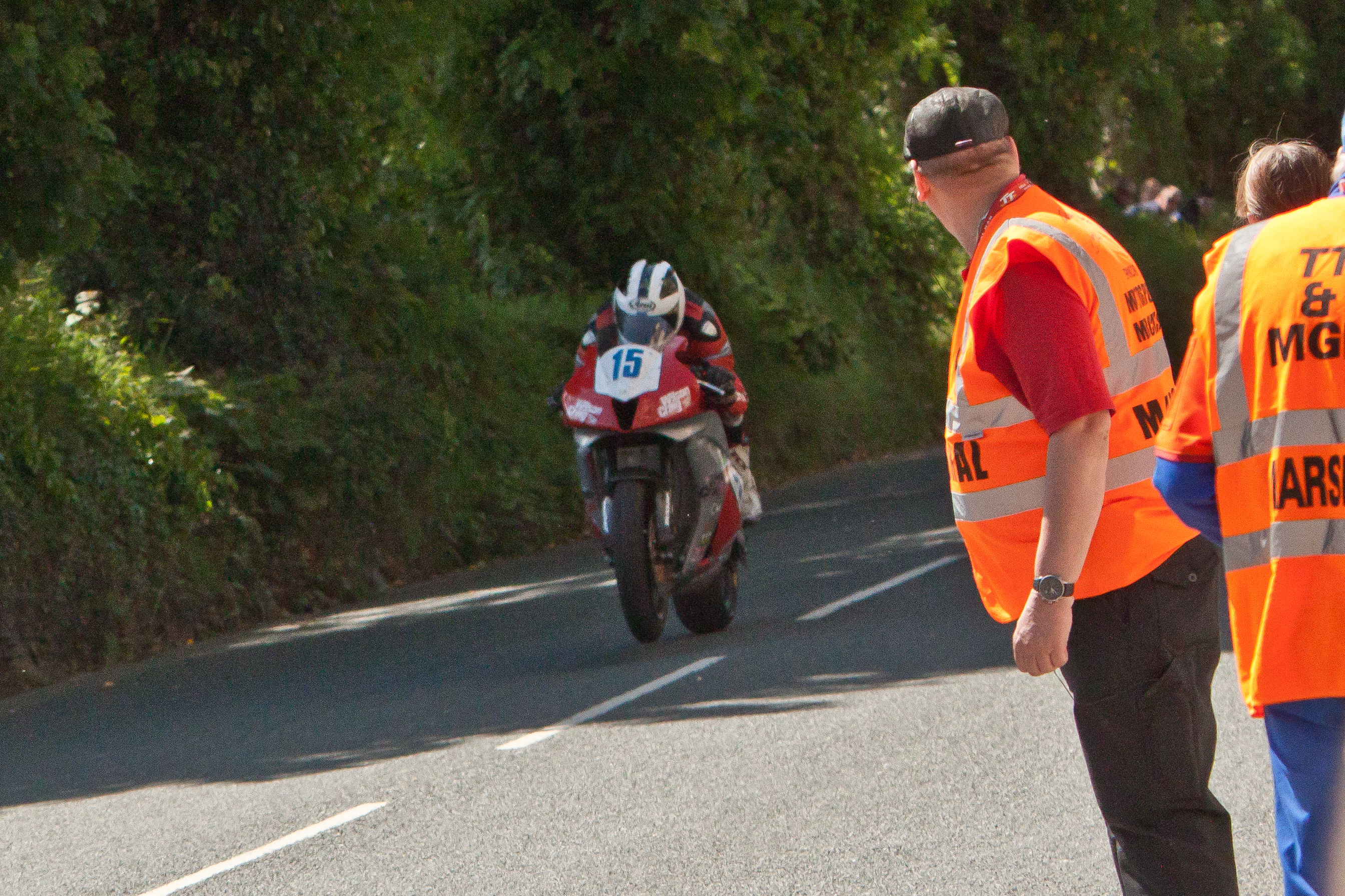
William Dunlop at the Sulby Straight

The Isle of Man is known for the Isle of Man TT motorcycle races which are held each June.

Sulby Straight is recognised as being the fastest straight on the Isle of Man TT circuit.

Sulby village, including the 1.55 kilometres (0.96 mi) Sulby Straight and Sulby Bridge, was part of the 37.50 Mile Four Inch Course for the RAC Tourist Trophy automobile races held in the Isle of Man between 1908 and 1922.

In 1911, the Four Inch Course for automobiles was first used by the Auto-Cycling Union for the Isle of Man TT motor-cycle races. This included the Sulby Straight. The course later became known as the 37.73 mile Isle of Man TT Course which has been used since 1911 for the Isle of Man TT Races and from 1923 for the Manx Grand Prix races.

During a practice session for the 2006 Isle of Man TT races, New Zealander Bruce Anstey achieved the unofficial current top speed record of 206 mph (332 km/h) at the end of Sulby straight near the Kella crossroads. This speed value was registered by the on-board data-logging equipment. This unofficial speed record was achieved again in 2015 by the TT competitor James Hillier riding the Kawasaki H2R factory concept bike during a demonstration lap, recorded by onboard Strava data-logging equipment.

== Sulby Bridge ==
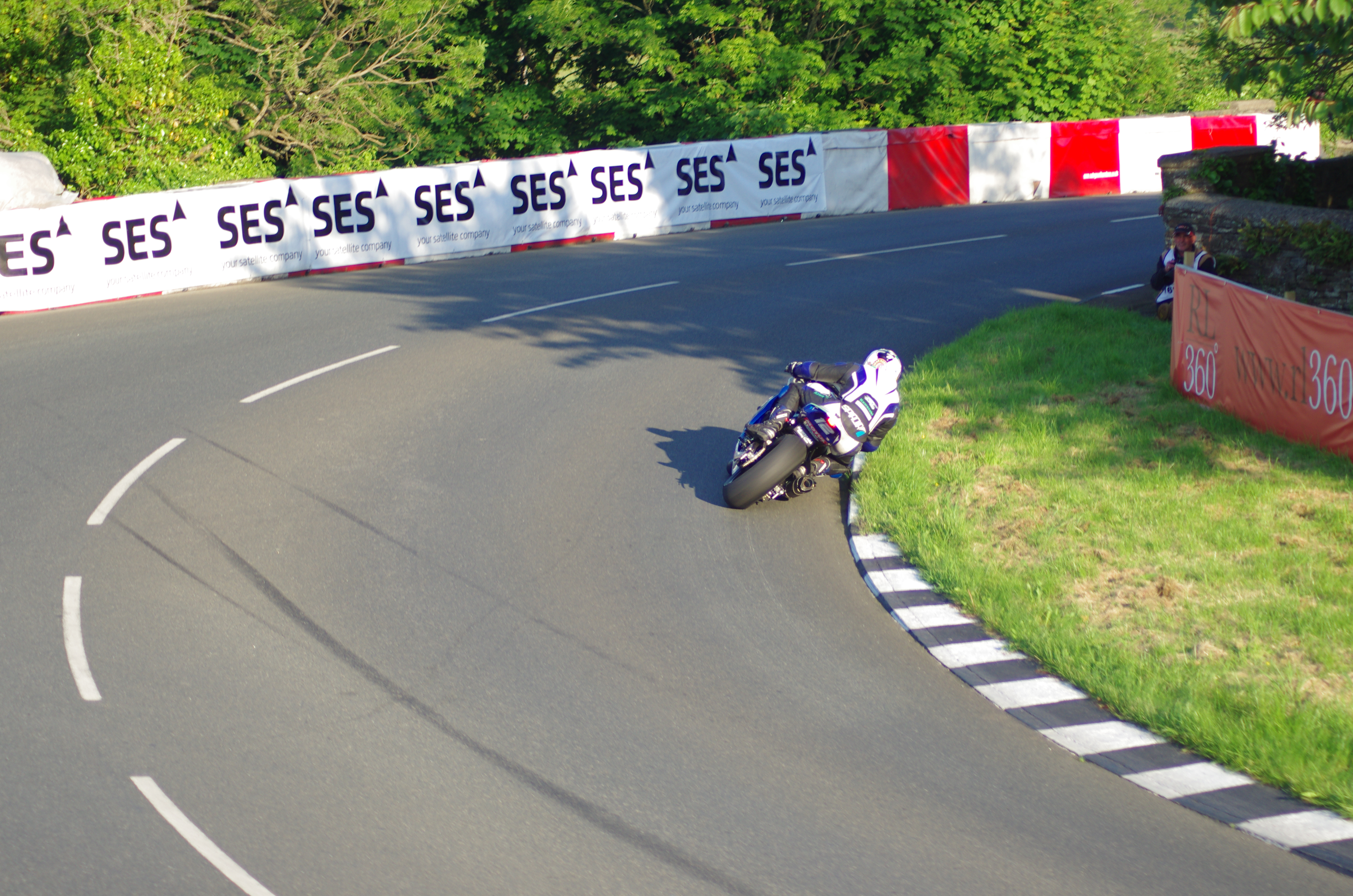
Dean Harrison at Sulby Bridge during TT practice in May 2014

The notorious hump-backed Sulby Bridge on the A3 road located at the eastern end of the Sulby Straight (built c.1815), considered at the time to be the most difficult part of the TT Course for motor-cycle competitors, was removed in 1922-23 by the Isle of Man Highway Board. The road was widened and its profile improved.

The Sulby Bridge was originally built in 1739 as a result of the 1739 Bridges Act to improve access to roads in the Isle of Man. The nearby 'Five Ton Bridge' over the Sulby river was built in 1935 on the Sulby Claddagh to replace a ford and footbridge damaged in flooding in September 1930.

== Sulby railway stations ==
The village of Sulby was previously served by the Sulby Glen and Sulby Bridge railway stations until the Ramsey to St. Johns line closed in 1968.

== Produce ==
ManX Spirit is a clear alcoholic beverage that is distilled from whisky by Kella Distillers Ltd in Sulby.

== Notable people ==
- Elizabeth Holloway Marston (1893–1993), attorney and psychologist, born in Sulby
- Sidney Swann (1890–1976), clergyman and rower, born in Sulby

== See also ==
- Sulby Bridge railway station
- Sulby Glen railway station
- Sulby Reservoir
