= Isle of Man Railway level crossings and points of interest =

One of the characteristics of the Isle of Man Railway is the numerous level crossings and farm crossings along the various routes; many smaller crossing places are marked only by gates that criss-cross farm land and provide access to private roads connecting the farms to the main roads. Being largely rural in nature the railway has many of these scattered along the existing South Line, and there were many more on the closed sections of the railway. These can be summarised as follows, along with other points of interest along the line not covered in the Isle of Man Railway stations section:-

== The South Line ==
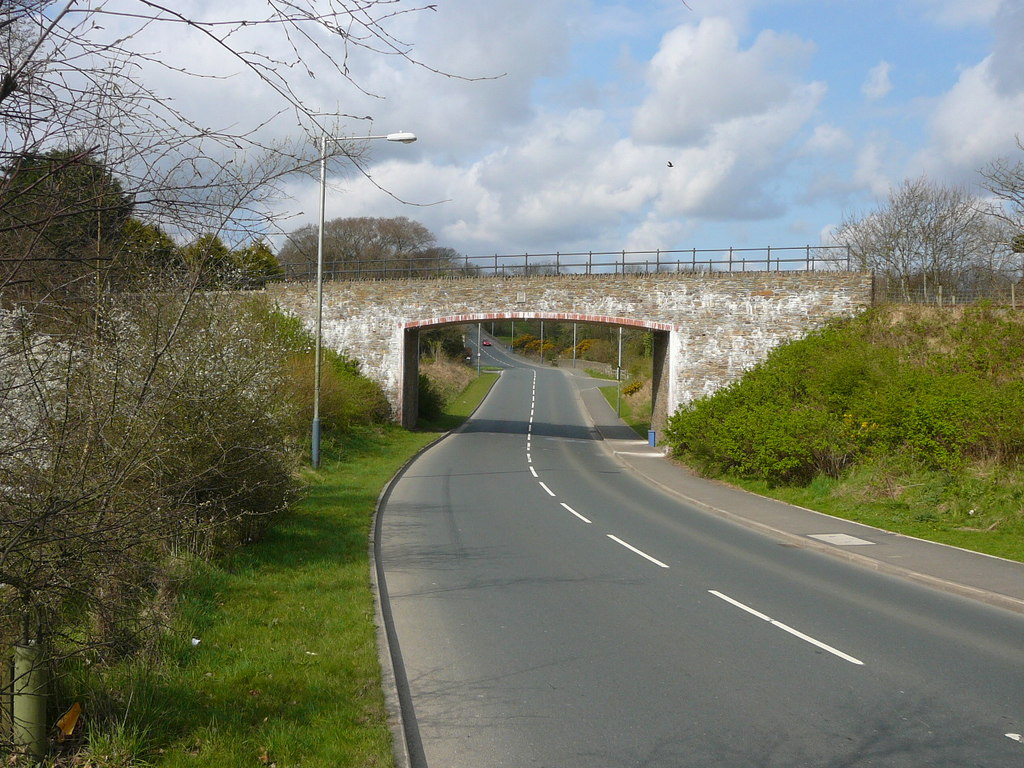
Kewaigue (New) Bridge (2010)

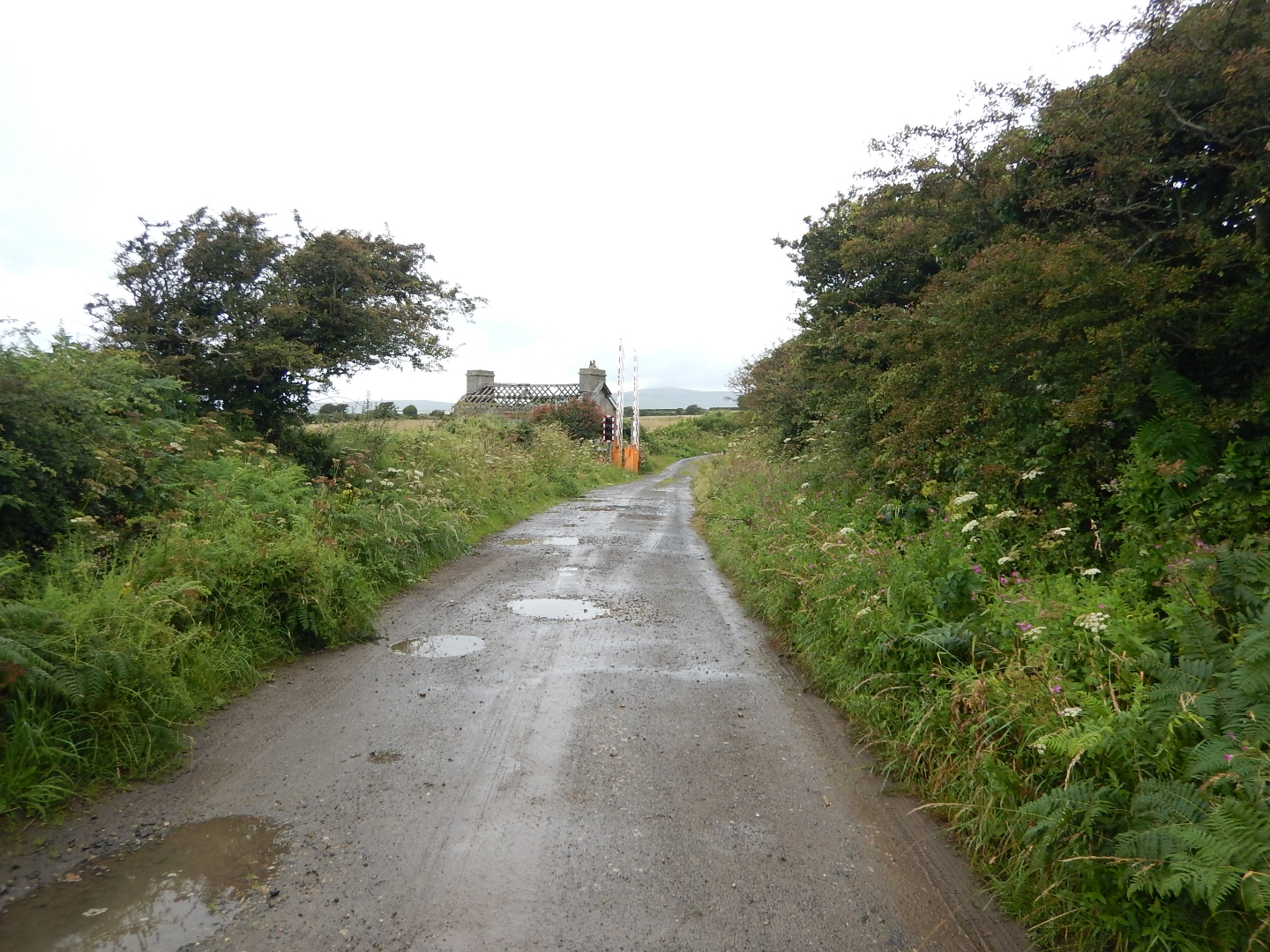
Ballawoods Crossing (2017)

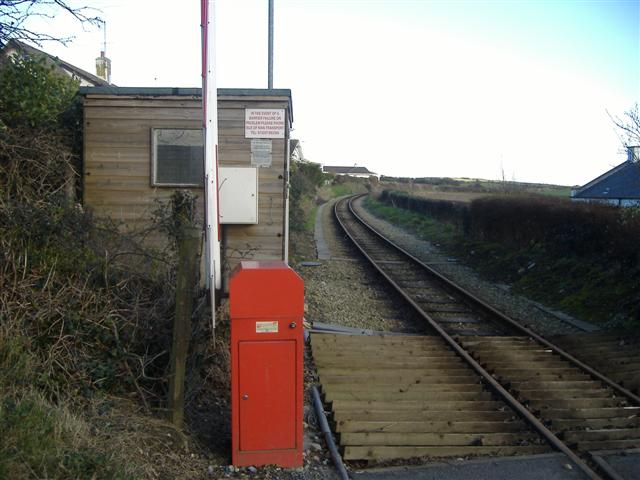
Ballahick Crossing (2006)

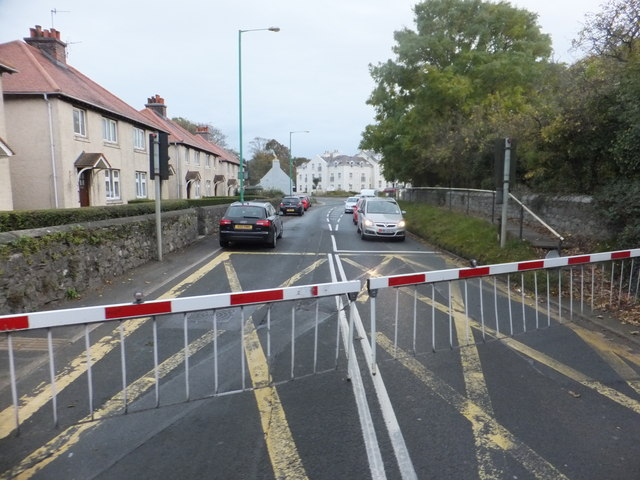
Ballasalla Crossing (2015)

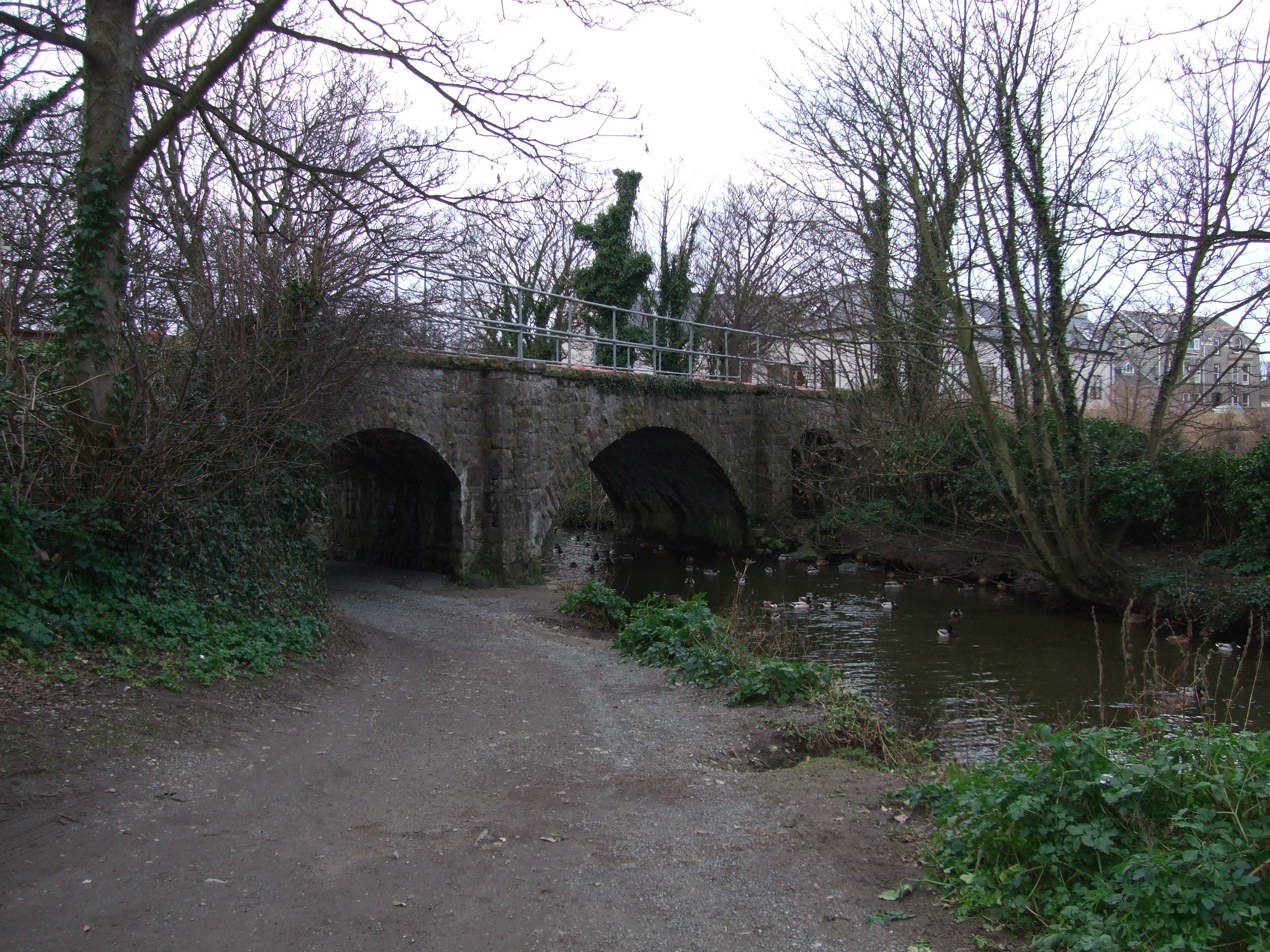
Silverburn Bridge (2010)

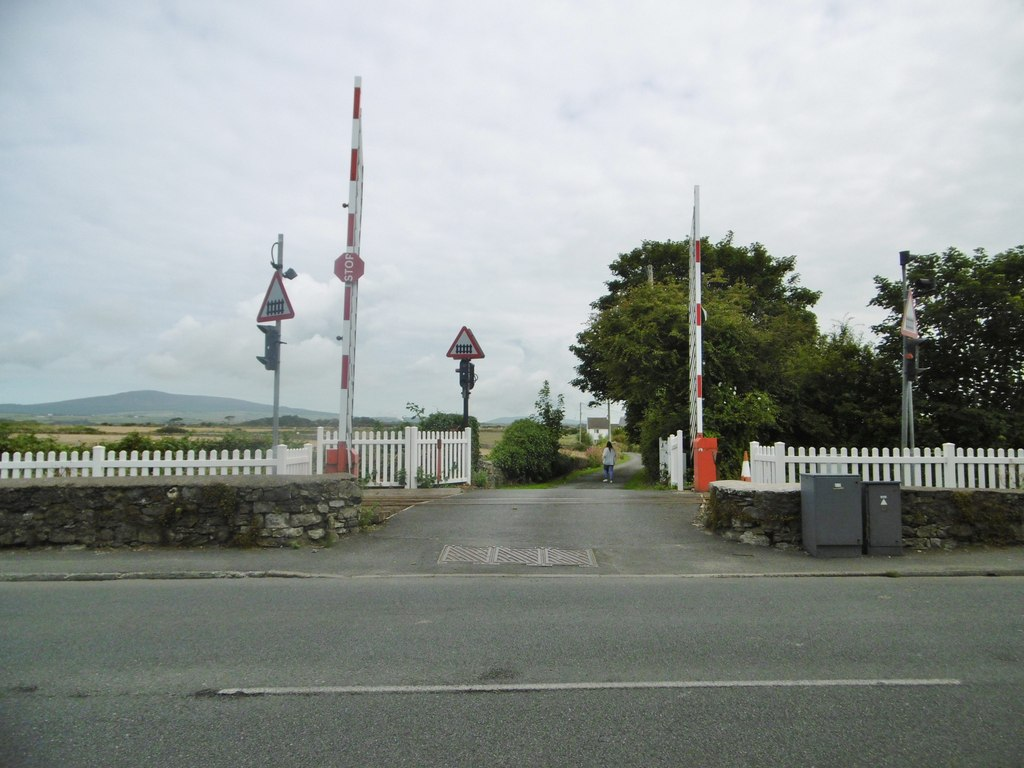
Mill Road Crossing (2015)

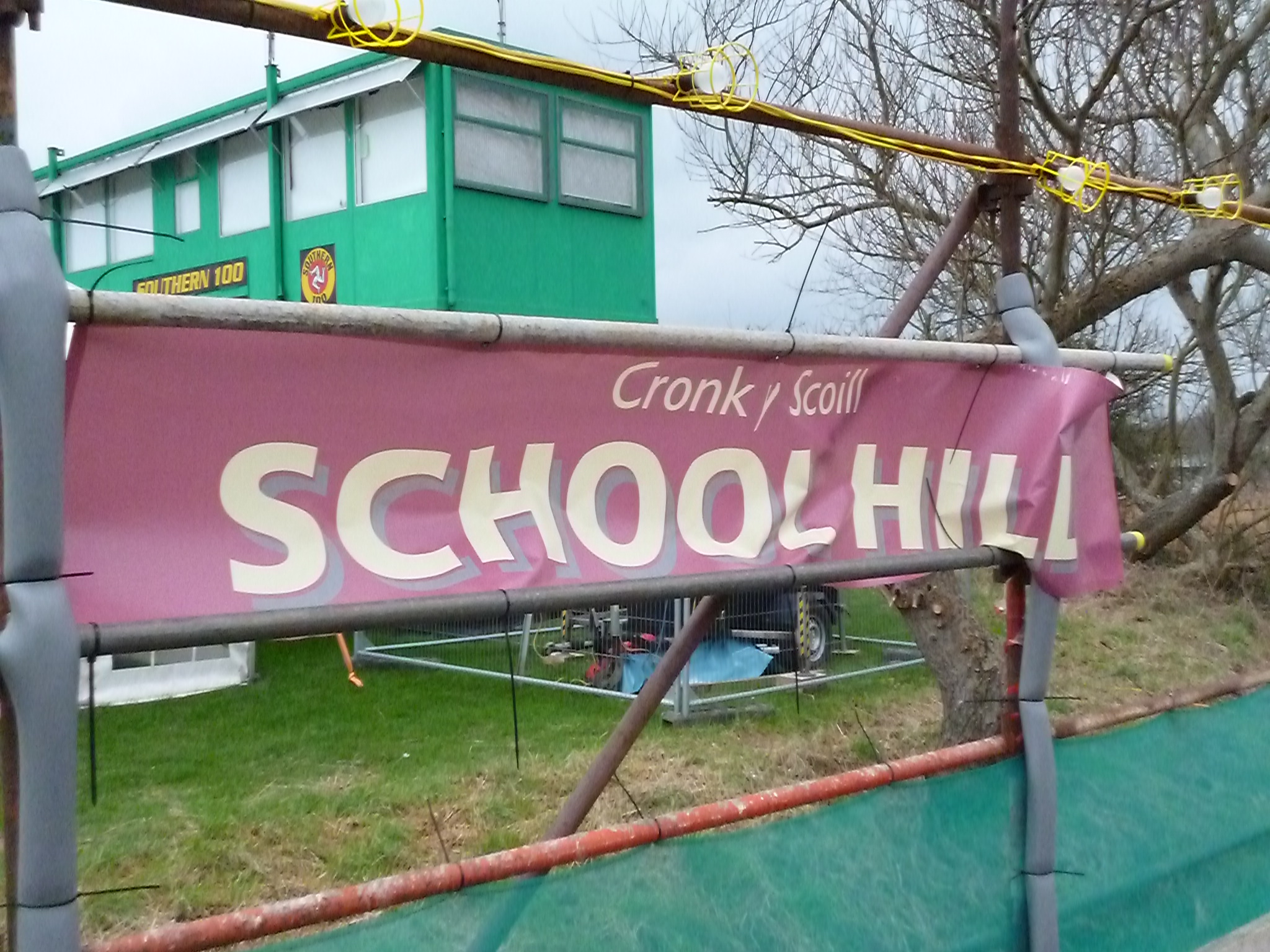
School Hill Halt (2012)

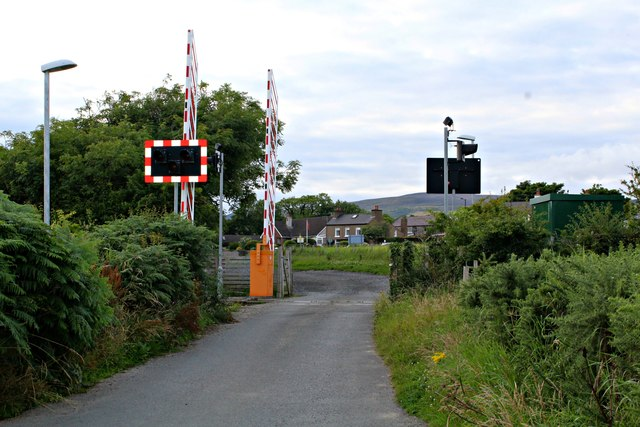
Colby F.C. Crossing (2016)

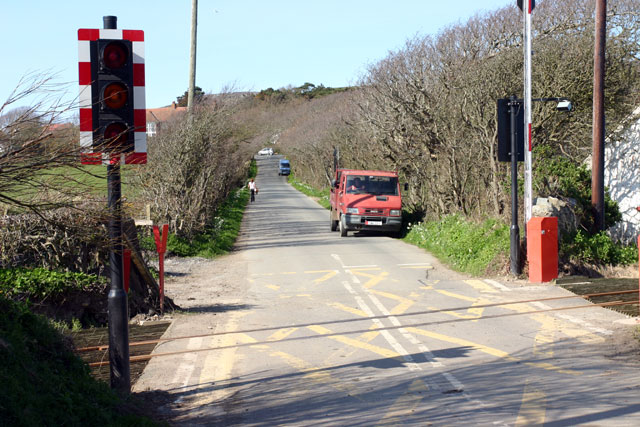
Ballagawne Crossing (2005)

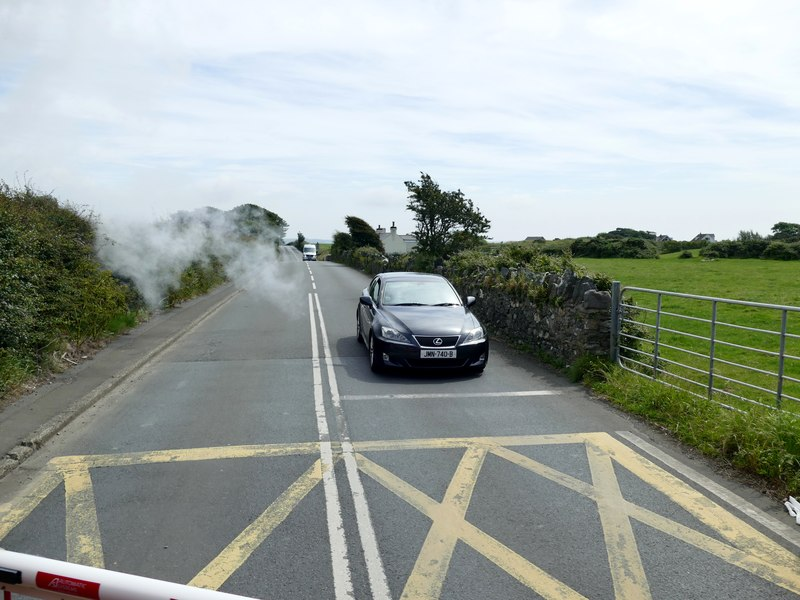
Passing Four Roads (2017)

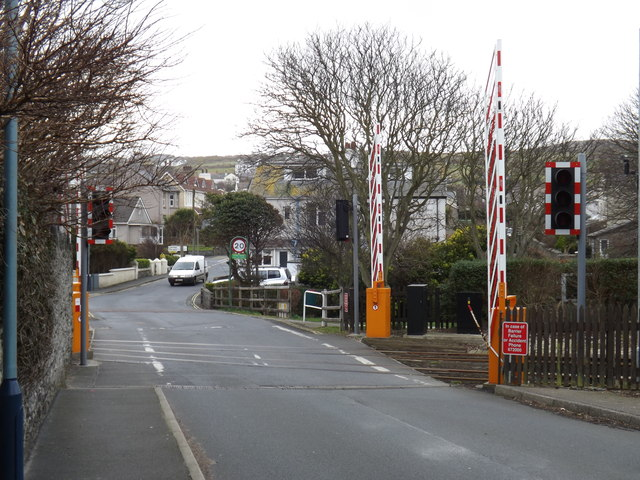
Droghdfayle Road (2015)

=== Nunnery Bridge ===
The first major structure on the line, carrying it over the River Douglas before the climb through the Nunnery Cutting. The original bridge was replaced in the winter of 1979. In November 1894, flooding washed away most of the central pillar of the original bridge, leaving only a fragment standing. The rest of the structure was undamaged. All trains were halted and passengers with their luggage had to make their way on foot across the bridge to an awaiting train to continue their journey. In March 1895, the acting chairman of the 25th ordinary general meeting of the Isle of Man Railway Company announced that temporary repairs to the bridge had been completed but the company intended to do away with the central pier and replace it with a lattice girder bridge spanning the whole river.

=== White Hoe ===
The first level crossing on the south line, remaining ungated until the addition of automated barriers in 2001, it served the access road to an isolation hospital of the same name, demolished and replaced with a youth correctional facility in recent times. The two-storey gatekeepers house was also demolished and replaced; in 1993 a train collided with a car here.

=== Kewaigue ("Snotty") Bridge(s) ===
The original bridge carried the railway over the public road and became known as the "snotty" bridge owing to the presence of stalactites; as part of road widening which took place 1999-2001 a further wider bridge (pictured) was constructed on the northerly side and the existing road diverted, the railway is still carried over both structures.

=== Meary Veg & Rifle Range (Ballacostain) ===
Site of the all-island sewage works, a new bridge over the railway was constructed here in 2001 taking the name of the works "Meary Veg". Some 500 yards south, a request stop was once established here for the adjacent rifle range, used by pupils of King William's College in Castletown. The site of the grass platform is still barely discernible today, the nearby bridge has the same name.

=== Ballalonna ===
This is the first "proper" level crossing on the south line of the Isle of Man Railway and can be found on the south side of Santon station; it serves an adjoining farm of the same name. The crossing was provided with a small hut similar in style to the one at Mill Road further along the line and this was retained though out of use, being constructed of slatted timber with corrugated iron roof until its demolition in 2017.

=== Ballastrang ===
This crossing is complete with its own (now privately owned) crossing lodge which was sold off and replaced with a common or garden shed in more recent years. The crossing was the subject of controversy in 2002 when all crossings on the railway were automated. The local farmer who utilises the crossing refused to allow the railway to install the automatic barriers as it had elsewhere and so therefore this remains the final surviving staffed occupational level crossing on the railway, and indeed on the island.

=== Ballawoods ===
A farm crossing on the approach to the station at Ballasalla. It has been unstaffed since automation in 2002 when the traditional level crossing gates were replaced with modern lifting barrier controls. This crossing, despite only serving a nearby farm, is typical of the rural community and features a large (now derelict) gatekeeper's two storey house, once alleged to have been home to "Blackcurrant Jack", somewhat of a local legend who was once employed as crossing keeper and used to walk the line collecting blackberries for making jam between the train services. The original crossing keeper's house, which had been derelict for many years, was demolished in February 2018 as part of a new development taking place near the railway line, a replica was later built on the seaward side and running-in boards added in 2023, though this is not a stopping place; on the landward side work began in 2019 on constructing the so called "Hobbit House", this remains incomplete at May 2024.

=== Ballahick ===
A level crossing the northerly side of Ballasalla Station, which was automated in 2002; prior to this the crossing was staffed, and featured traditional crossing gates. The road it carries over the railway line leads only to a private dwelling. 54.100°N 4.612°W; it was furnished with a small timber shelter with corrugated roof similar to that which has been restored at Mill Road, though this was removed in 1980 and replaced with a modern shed which itself was demolished when the crossing became fitted with barriers, initially controller from Ballasalla Station though now automated. Since the adjacent housing development was initiated this has been an access only road.

=== Mill Road ===
A small level-crossing situated on the southerly side of Castletown railway station and consisting of a basic wooden hut for the gatekeeper to the side of the line. Being located close by the town it was never fully staffed but merely attended at the relevant train times in latter years. By 2002 the crossing was automated but the small hut remained in place, though unused. The crossing serves a private dwelling which is clearly visible from the passing train, and is a large mill (now defunct) and farmhouse. 54.078°N 4.652°W. In early 2014 the original crossing lodge was removed for full restoration by volunteers of the Isle of Man Steam Railway Supporters' Association and stored in the goods shed at Port St. Mary; the restored building was returned to the site in the spring of 2017.

=== School Hill ===
A temporary station was established here in 2012 when the railway operated out of season school trains during a bus drivers' dispute; the temporary platform was made from scaffolding and a marquee erected as a waiting area; the site was cleared in 2013 and stands close to the marshalling area of the Billown Circuit of the Southern 100 motorcycle races.

=== Kentraugh ===
A small farm track which had, until 2002, a seasonally staffed level crossing. Until automation there was a creosoted shed for the crossing keeper, but the crossing was rarely staffed between trains and staff usually attended at the relevant train times on the timetable. The crossing is located between the stations at Colby and Level on the southern portion of the line. 54.092°N 4.715°W

=== Ballagawne ===
A level crossing situated between the stations of Level and Port St Mary on south line of the railway which remains open today. It consists of a crossing keepers' lodge which is now disused since the introduction of automatic crossing barriers in 2002 and provides access to the farm of the same name through means of through road which connects the "back" Colby road to the main coast road. The crossing lodge is larger than many others on the railway and was substantial enough to have provided residential accommodation for the keeper in the past, effectively being twice the size of the original structure. This is clear upon viewing the building from a passing train. 54.088°N 4.730°W The lodge was sold privately in February 2015.

=== Four Roads ===
Bisecting the main coastal road between Castletown and Port Erin, this crossing still boasts its own stone-built gatekeepers' hut and the gatekeepers' house remains extant on the southern side of the line although this is now a private residence. A roundabout further up the highway has also gained this title, taken from the railway's crossing.54.084°N 4.736°W. The small lodge here was restored by the volunteers of the Isle of Man Steam Railway Supporters' Association in 2013 at which time it was fitted with bilingual running in board (now also reading Kiare Raaidyn), new fencing and the whole area smartened up considerably. Similar works have also been carried out at other former staffed occupational crossings along the line.

=== Droghadfayle Road ===
Crossing at the throat of Port Erin Station, gated and manually operated until 2010 when automatic barriers were installed; until the yard was relaid in 1999 locomotives had to open one portion of the gates to run round their trains, the points being relocated after this to avoid this practice. The spur for the new (1999) carriage shed also bisects the road and requires operation of the barriers to access it.

== The Peel Line ==
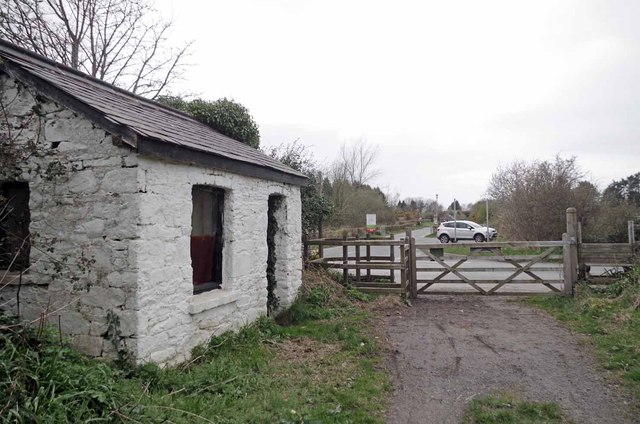
Ballacraine Crossing (2014)

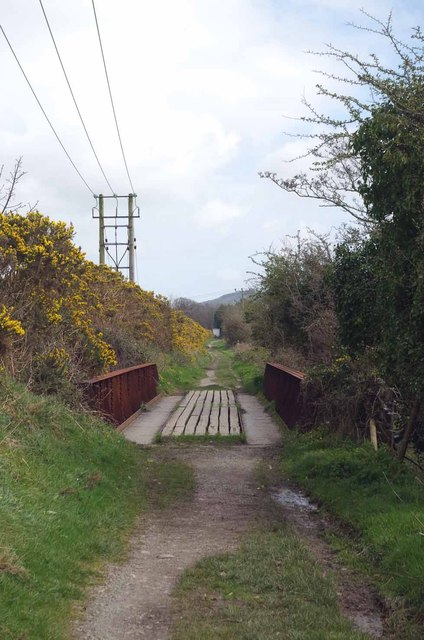
Peel Line Bridge (2014)

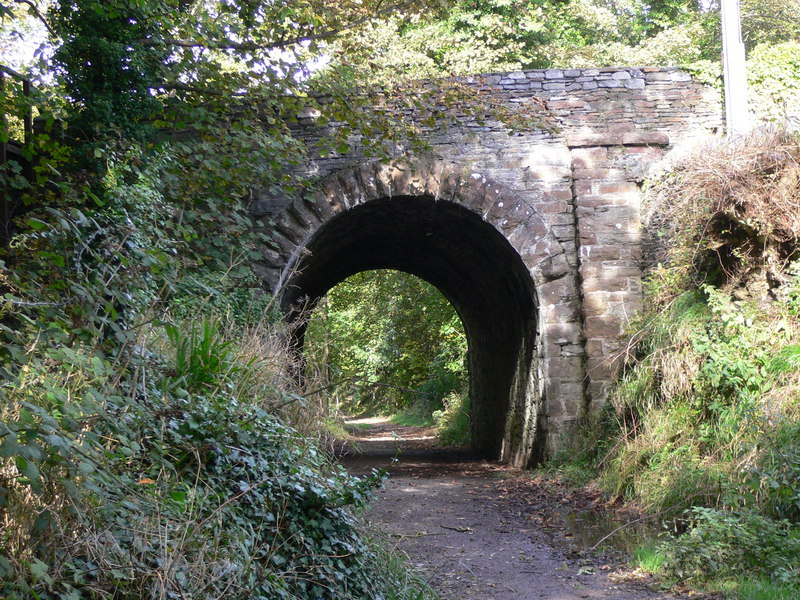
Glenfaba Bridge (2010)

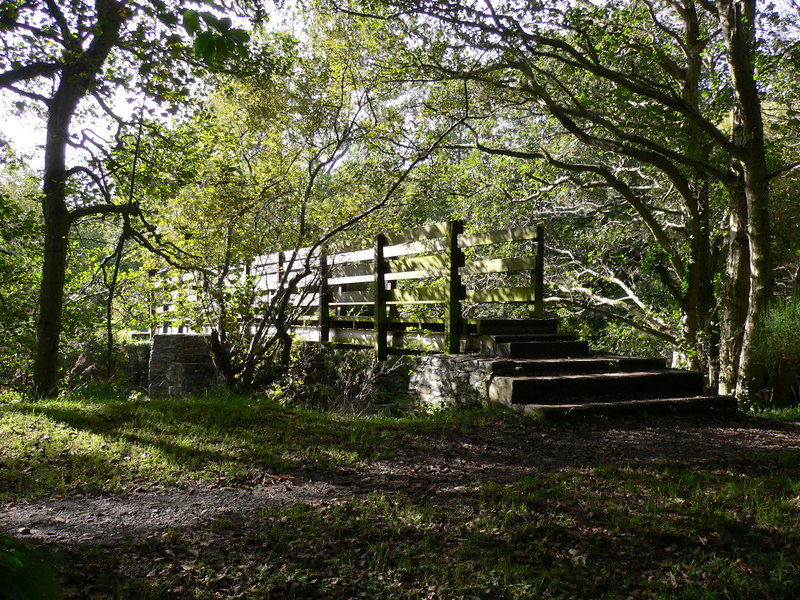
Riber Neb Footbridge (2010)

=== Pulrose Racecourse ===
An early level crossing point, later being replaced by a road bridge carrying the Pulrose Road, this was initially made into a request stop titled simply 'Racecourse' serving the nearby horse racing circuit on the site of today's National Sports Centre; during the construction of the sporting arena and nearby housing estate sidings were laid here for construction trains to deposit building materials, resulting in the bridge being of dual construction, though one aperture was never used.

=== Quarterbridge ===
This was the point where the railway crossed the main road for the first time and was initially provided with a standard stone-built lodge which remains extant today albeit derelict; later a crossing keepers' house was constructed and the site became a short-lived request stop in connection with motorcycle events (the famous T.T. circuit is next to the railway at this point. Long after closure an access road was established on the trackbed, opening in 1988, commencing from this point.

=== Ballacraine ===
Originally a level crossing point for the St. John's to Foxdale Road, this was briefly another request stop, again in connection with the T.T. races, being a short walk from the popular observation point at Ballacraine Crossroads, where scenes in the George Formby film No Limit! where filmed. It remained a staffed level crossing until the closure of the railway and the stone lodge remains in situ today.

=== Gravel Pits ===
Immediately before entering St. John's Station there was a short spur leading to the railway's sand and gravel pits, itself served by a narrow gauge railway with hand-propelled hopper wagons, visible on several period images of the station. The spur remained in place long after it ceased operation as did the plant machinery on the site.

=== Glenfaba Mill ===
A large rustic watermill which is passed by trains and remains in situ today although out of use for many years; this was a popular place for the railway to use for commercial postcards and several were produced featuring the mill and its associated bridge.

=== Knockaloe Branch ===
During the Great War a spur was constructed from the main line to the alien internment camp at Knockaloe Farm, worked exclusively by the former Manx Northern Railway locomotive Caledonia and ceasing to exist by 1921, it ran straight into the camp itself with goods' only services; limited images of the line show the locomotive and a variety of wagons in use; the farm still exists as does the shed used to house the locomotive.

=== Brickworks Flangeway ===
This horse-drawn tramway crossed the main Douglas-Peel railway just outside the station yard at Peel and ceased to operate during the Second World War; archive images from 1937 show the line in operation with horses drawing laden wagons across the railway line in the direction of the town.

== The North Line ==
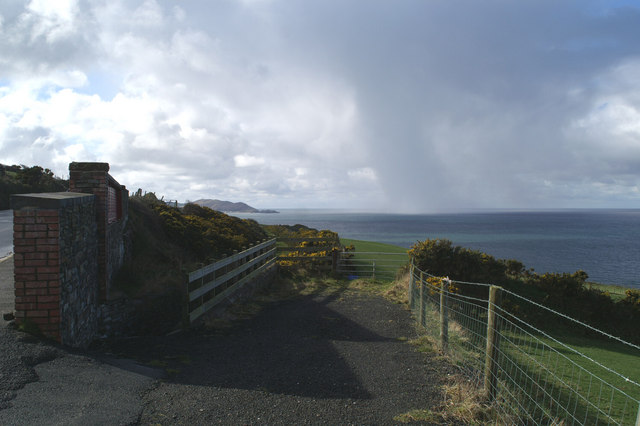
Ballaquine Bridge (2009)

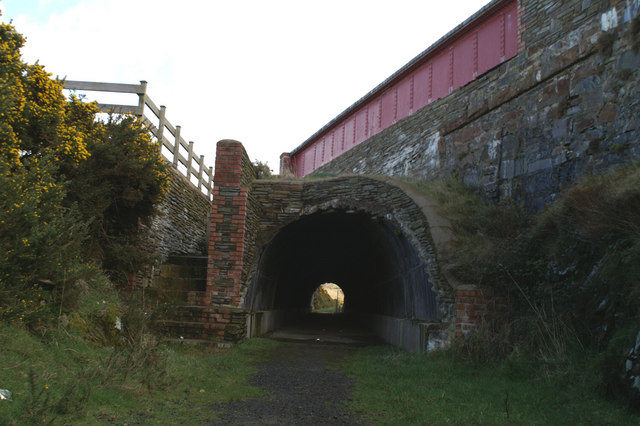
Ballaquine Bridge (2016)

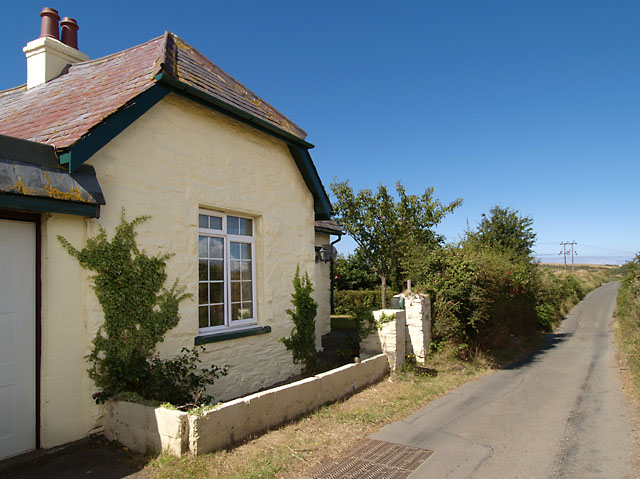
Orrisdale No.1 (2005)

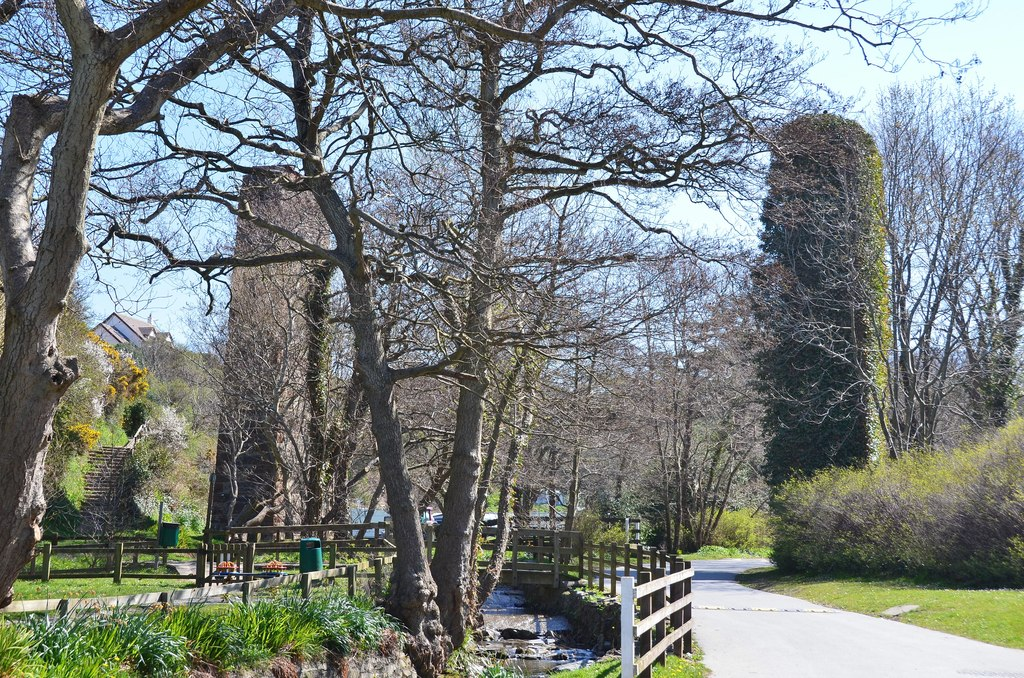
Glen Wyllin Viaduct (2015)

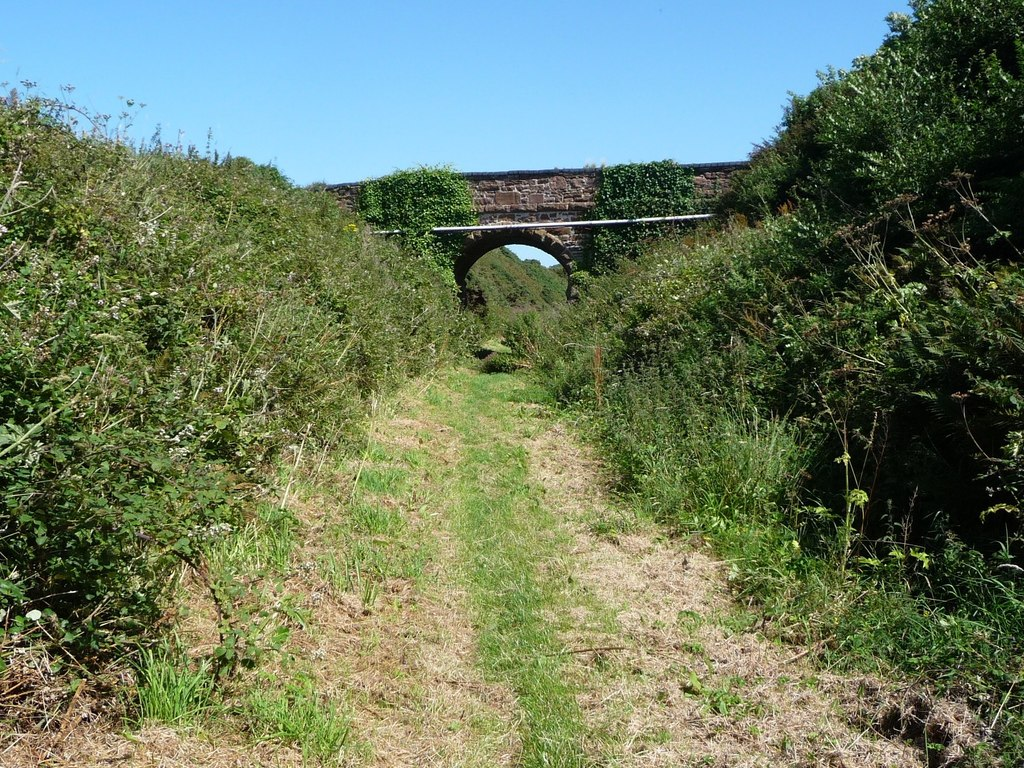
North Overbridge (2016)

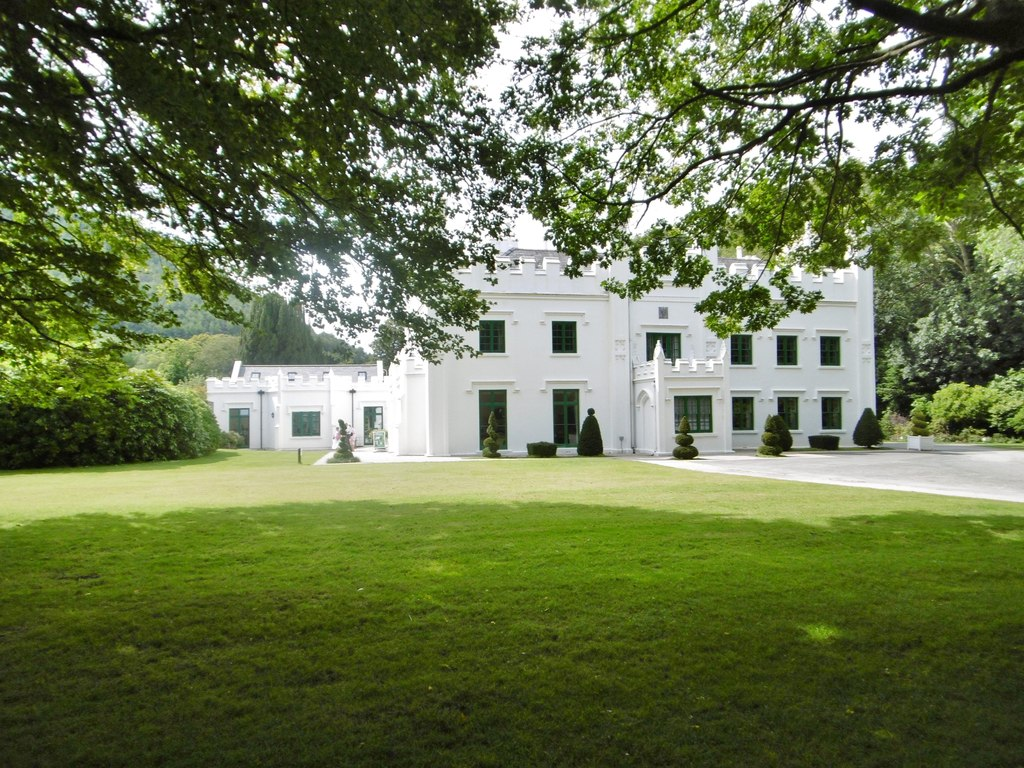
Milntown House (2015)

=== Gob-Y-Deigan ===
The exposed coastal section of the Manx Northern Railway between Peel Road and Glen Mooar viaduct was served by a small halt in the very early days of the railway. This section of line caused the railway company headaches over many years owing to subsidence which was regularly rectified by the dumping of used locomotive ash along the sides of the running line. This area is also cited as the reason for the railway acquiring a turntable to turn only the coaches, to equalise the weathering of paintwork at this exposed point. Today the trackbed is walkable and it has sunk even further. The halt was only short-lived and built to serve excursions for picnickers. It had no road access but did offer a basic waiting shelter, which survived in use as a lineside hut until the closure of the railway.

=== Devil's Elbow ===
High embankment carrying the railway along the coastline; this caused the railway company many headaches over the years owing to continued subsidence. Large quantities of ash and spoil were regularly emptied here to shore up the embankment and it is noticeable that although the bank remains today it has dropped by several feet in the intervening years since the railway closed; it remains as part of the island's coastal footpath today.

=== Glen Mooar Viaduct ===
The first and smaller of two viaducts on the Manx Northern Railway and was crossed by means of a lattice work frame by the passing trains. Today the stanchions remain but the framework was removed in 1975, the railway having closed in 1968. It can be found at 54.271°N 4.598°W

=== Glen Wyllin Viaduct ===
Second, larger viaduct carrying the railway above the Glen Wyllin pleasure grounds owned and operated by the railway company. The viaduct was removed in 1975 although the stanchions remain. The viaduct dominated the park below which featured a children's playground, boating lake, bowling greens, tennis courts and putting green. The site remains as a campsite but the majority of its features have been removed. A campsite toilet and shower block together with a shop have been provided in more recent times.

=== Orrisdale No. 1 & No.2 ===
Two crossings at close proximity found at 54.304°N 4.569°W and 54.305°N 4.564°W with associated crossing keepers' dwellings, both of which now form private residences since the closure of the railway in 1968 and sale of much property in 1975.

=== West Berk ===
The halt was only short-lived and, while recorded in Manx Northern Railway documents, its exact location is not known for certain other than as being adjacent to a level crossing. The crossing lodge remains in situ today, forming a private residence having been sold off in 1974.

=== Ballavolley Halt ===
Only operational in the last year that the Isle of Man Railway operated the line to Ramsey in 1968. Prior to this it had been nothing more than a farm crossing which boasted its own lodge, still in existence today; the "Wild Life Park" was established here in late 1967 and the railway installed an ad hoc halt here the following year, with temporary platform area and fencing. Today, you cross over the remaining rails in the macadam on the way into the park, and the trackbed stretches out virtually straight either side of you, but the rails are the only hint of the line's existence. At one time there was a siding laid here but little is known of its use and it did not last long. The embankment on which it sat is sometimes visible in a nearby field however.54.315°N 4.517°W

=== Milntown ===
Site of former oil siding (1968-1969) found at 54.323°N 4.402°W used during the short-lived experiment to transport oil in three tankers between Ramsey and Peel during the period in which Lord Ailsa operated the railway; this siding has the distinction of being used for the final stock movements on the north line when No. 4 Loch transported the final oil tankers in September 1968. The track at this point was so sharply curved that a locomotive could not enter the siding, and bogie runners were placed between it and the oil wagons to allow access to the facility.

=== Quayside Extension ===
Extending beyond the environs of Ramsey Station along the quayside and lifted by 1958.

== See also ==
- Isle of Man Railway stations
- Isle of Man Railway
- Isle of Man Steam Railway Supporters' Association
