= Kirk Michael railway station =

Former railway station in Isle of Man, UK

Kirk Michael Balley Keeill Vaayl
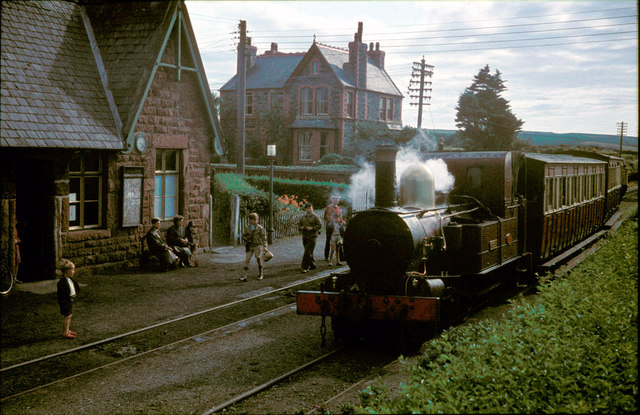

General information
- Location: Station Road, Kirk Michael
- Coordinates: 54.284°N 4.587°W
- System: The Isle of Man Railway Co., Ltd. The Manx Northern Railway Co., Ltd.
- Owner: Isle of Man Railway Co.
- Line: North Line
- Platforms: Two (Ground Level)
- Tracks: Running Lines & Sidings

Construction
- Structure type: Station & Goods Shed
- Parking: None Provided

History
- Opened: 23 September 1879; 147 years ago
- Closed: 6 September 1968; 58 years ago
- Former names: Manx Northern Railway Co.

Passengers
- Passengers / Livestock / Freight

Services
Booking Facilities / Waiting Room / Toilets
Location

Kirk Michael Railway Station (Manx: Stashoon Raad Yiarn Valley Keeill Vaayl) was an intermediate station on the Manx Northern Railway (MNR), which ran between St. John's and Ramsey in the Isle of Man, later owned and operated by the Isle of Man Railway. It served the village of Kirk Michael.

== Origins ==
Kirk Michael was about halfway between Ramsey and St. John's, and was planned as a passing place for trains when the line was first surveyed in 1877. Kirk Michael was the largest village between the two termini, and the MNR intended it to be a main intermediate station. The station was opened on 23 September 1879.

== Buildings ==
=== Station Building ===
The station was provided with quite substantial sandstone, slate roofed buildings, consisting of station master's office and waiting room. The main station building was constructed, like other stations on this line, in local red sandstone, in a style to those elsewhere on the route; a similar one still also remains at St. Germain's.

=== Goods shed ===
A small goods shed was provided upon opening; it was later rebuilt. The new building remains on site today; it is stone-built by the Isle of Man Railway in 1923 in improve capacity, owing to an increase in freight traffic. It is not in the distinctive red sandstone of the station and has a more utilitarian appearance.

=== Water tower ===
There was a water tank at the southern end of the station, which was used by locomotives travelling in either direction, though more the engines of southbound trains would uncouple from the train to take water here, in order to not block the level crossing. The long run from Ramsey with longer trains sometimes required a watering stop en route. The tower was a simple brick-built construction and was demolished in 1975 at the same time as the rails and sleepers through the station were lifted.

== Locale ==
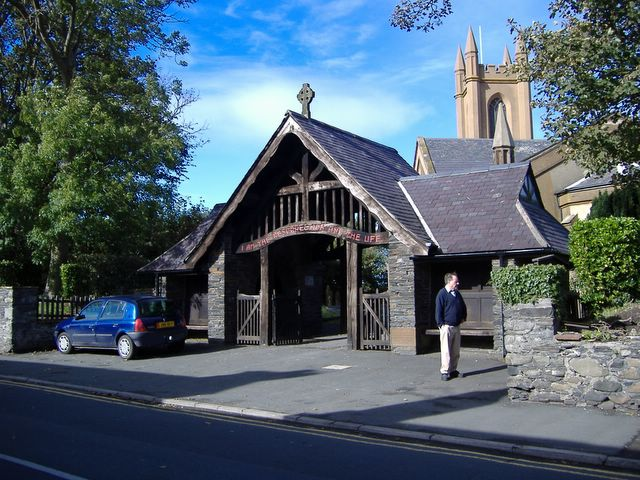
Church Lychgate

The station was near the centre of Kirk Michael, on a minor road leading to the coast. At the top of Station Road the follows spreads out; nearby were a branch of the Isle of Man Bank (closed in 2014 after over 100 years of service), the Mitre Hotel, the local primary school, village stores, local blacksmith, village butchers and the imposing Kirk Michael church with its oak-carved lychgate. The main road through the village forms part of the famous TT mountain circuit. After the railway closed, a steam centre was established not far from the station and this became home to a number of related items, most notably the locomotive Sea Lion from the Groudle Glen Railway. This facility was occasionally open to the public, but closed in 1984; much of the exhibits were relocated both on and off island. Several of them may be found today at the Jurby Transport Museum forming part of the John Walton Collection.

== Naming ==
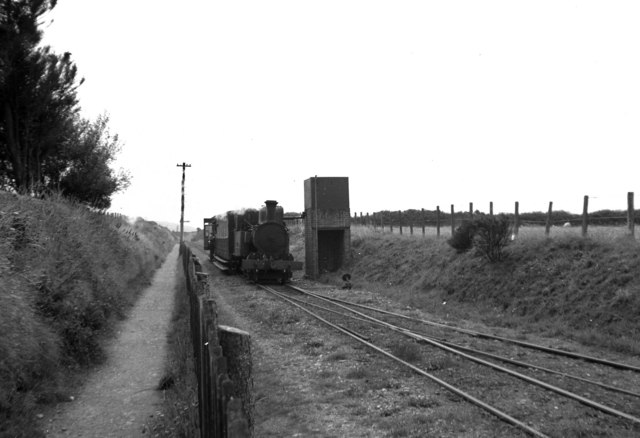
Approaching

The village is named for the church, a prominent landmark. Much of the Isle of Man Railway's marketing gave the station name as either ’Michael or simply Michael, the apostrophe one assumes acknowledging the "Kirk" prefix, but in later times the station was given its full title. On much of the railway's marketing and advertising material the single name title is given consistently; however the distinctive station running in boards always showed the name in full, as did all tickets issued to/from the station until the closure (it remained as a staffed station for the passing of trains until the final year of service). The station was also marketed heavily in conjunction with Glen Wyllin, which later became a railway-owned and operated concern (see below). The station had several signs advising passengers to alight here for the pleasure grounds.

== Glen Wyllin ==
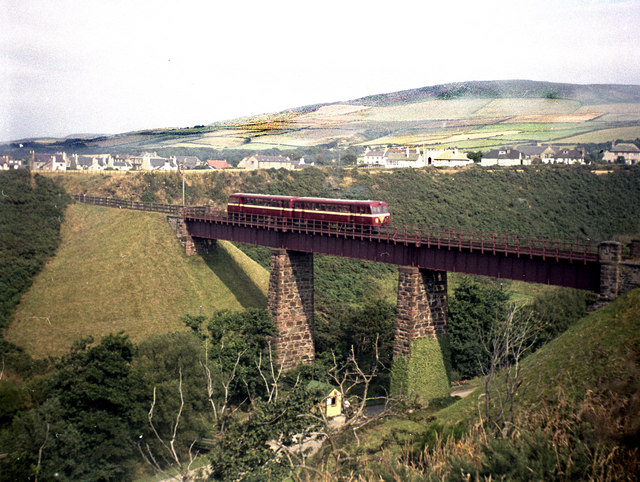
Ex-County Donegal Diesel Railcars Crossing Glen Wyllin Viaduct

In addition to the village, the station also served the nearby Glen Wyllin Pleasure Grounds, an area in a nearby valley which was developed in the 1890s as a private undertaking upon the arrival of the railway. This was once one of the most popular and profitable tourist destinations on the island. The line passed over the wide valley by means of a lattice girder bridge which was replaced in 1922 by a plate girder construction. The glen runs down to the sea where there is a long partly sandy beach that stretches along the island's north-western coast. The glen itself was later purchased and further developed by the Isle of Man Railway to include a boating lake, pedalos, swings slides and other children's attractions; the glen is fondly remembered by generations of local children whose annual Sunday School outing was often a trip on the train to visit the glen.

Between the station and the glen there was a pathway parallel to the running line giving access to the park. Today the glen is popular with campers and has its own shop and showering facilities though the attractions have long since disappeared. The distinctive viaduct was demolished in 1975, but the stone-built stanchions remain today as a lasting reminder of the railway's popularity and development of the glen.

== Today ==
A set of mock-up level crossing gates have been installed to show the site of the railway, and sections of rail remain in the macadam of the road. The pathway to Glen Wyllin remains, but the water tower was demolished in 1975 when the rails were lifted. The station site forms part of a heritage "Rail Trail"; it follows the former railway line and was established along all former trackbeds between Douglas, Peel and Ramsey in 1993, which was designated as the "Year Of Railways" on the island.

== Fire Station ==
The station buildings still survive today and now house the local fire brigade offices; the goods shed has been converted to house the fire engine. This has been in place since 1981, although some modifications have been made to the structures, notably adoption of the goods shed doors to accommodate the fire engine; but the station building retains its unique appearance.

== Route ==
Preceding station	Disused railways	Following station
West Berk towards St. John's	Manx Northern Railway later Isle of Man Railway	Bishop's Court towards Ramsey

== See also ==
- Isle of Man Railway stations
- Kirk Michael
