= Glen Wyllin =

Glen in the Isle of Man

Coordinates: 54.2795°N 4.592°W

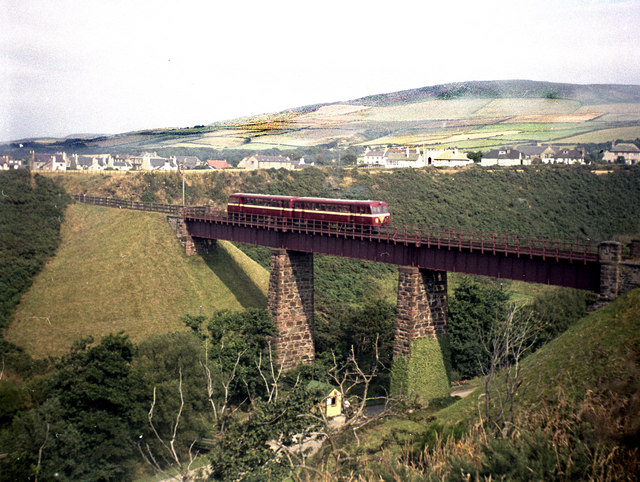
Railway diesel cars cross Glen Wyllin viaduct

Glen Wyllin is a glen in the Isle of Man. It is one of the officially-listed Manx National Glens.

The Glen Wyllin Pleasure Grounds are owned by the Isle of Man Railway whose line crossed the valley by means of a viaduct, this area was once the site of much activity for the holiday maker and Sunday School tripper. The grounds at Glen Wyllin were developed in the late 19th century upon the arrival of the railway and included a boating lake, merry-go-round, attractions, and the beach which adjoins it. Today the site is still maintained as a camp site and features a shop, communal showers and toilets, and a children's play area, all dominated by the two towering pillars which once supported the viaduct carrying the railway line, but it is a shadow of its former self, having been a booming centre for leisure in the halcyon days of tourism on the island, still so fondly remembered by the local Sunday School children and the like.

In 2015, the Manx Department of Environment, Food and Agriculture offered private bids for the Glen Wyllin campsite.

In 2018, vandals broke into a trout-farming operation and closed a compression valve, killing over 4,500 rainbow trout. The trout farm closed and went up for sale in 2020.

== See also ==
- Kirk Michael railway station
- Isle of Man Railway stations
