= Kirk Michael =

Village in the Isle of Man

Coordinates: 54.2847452°N 4.5881535°W

Kirk Michael: Manx: Skylley Maayl
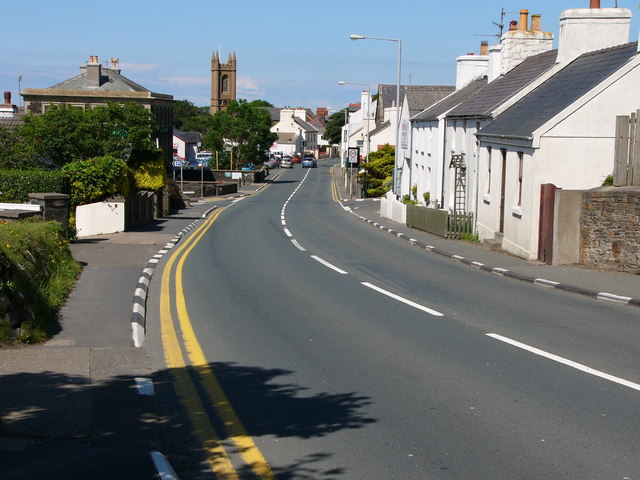
- The A3

- Location within the Isle of Man
- Parish: Michael
- Sheading: Michael
- Crown dependency: Isle of Man
- Postcode district: IM6
- Police: Isle of Man
- Fire: Isle of Man
- Ambulance: Isle of Man

Kirk Michael (Manx: Skylley Maayl) is a village and the principal settlement in the parish of Michael, Isle of Man. It is an agricultural village near the west coast, situated along the A3, 7 miles northeast of Peel on the way to Ballaugh.

== History ==
Writer John R. Quayle speculated Kirk Michael and Michael parish had historically been an important location as the sight of early Tynwald sittings at Reneurling one mile south of the village during the Middle Ages until 1422 and residence of the Lord Bishop at Bishopscourt one-and-a-half miles north of the village. The village was historically referred to as Kirk Michaell Town.

The Mitre Hotel, the local public house built in the early 19th century, is named in connection with Bishop's Court and was once patronised by Fletcher Christian (Mutiny on the Bounty). "Christian" is a popular Manx surname. On the same plot of land as the Mitre Hotel stands the Ecclesiastical Courthouse. First built in 1766, at the request of Bishop Wilson, and then later rebuilt in 1835, it was the last working rural courthouse on the Isle of Man.

Circa 1927, the village had a population of 353 residents, which was a decline.

=== Religion ===
The name of the village is derived from "Kirk" ("Church") of Michael. While the parish church site in the village dates back to the 13th century, the present Church of St Michael and All Angels was consecrated in 1835 and built in the Gothic Revival style. The church holds a large collection of Manx Norse crosses.

In addition to St Michael's and All Angels church, a Primitive Methodist chapel opened in Kirk Michael in 1824. Ebenezer Hall from 1868 is currently in use.

Kirk Michael village hosts the Oie'll Verree at Ebenezer Hall, an annual Manx live music tradition held to mark the "old" Christmas Eve on 5 January.

== Amenities ==
The village is served by several small local shops, a primary school and a public house. Glen Wyllin, with its campsite and mill, is located just south of the village.

== Transport ==
Kirk Michael is served by buses to Ramsey, Peel and Douglas. It is on the course of the former Manx Northern Railway.

The main road running through Kirk Michael forms part of the Isle of Man TT road race course known as the Snaefell Mountain Course, on the A3 leading towards Ballaugh Bridge. As of 2019, between 4,600 and 5,400 vehicles passed through the village on the A3. As of 2025, there are plans to lower speed limits within Kirk Michael.

== Notable people ==
- Mona Burgin, teacher, born in Kirk Michael
- John Rhys-Davies, actor, lives in Kirk Michael
- Andrew Williamson, Deputy Deemster of the Isle of Man, grew up in Kirk Michael

== Gallery ==
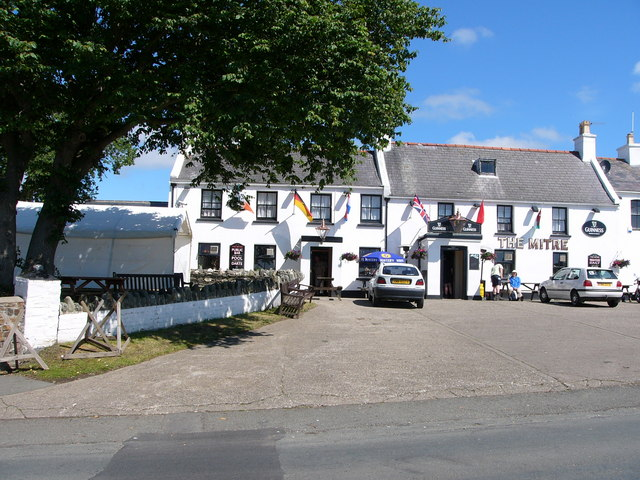
The Mitre

Bishopscourt

St Michael's

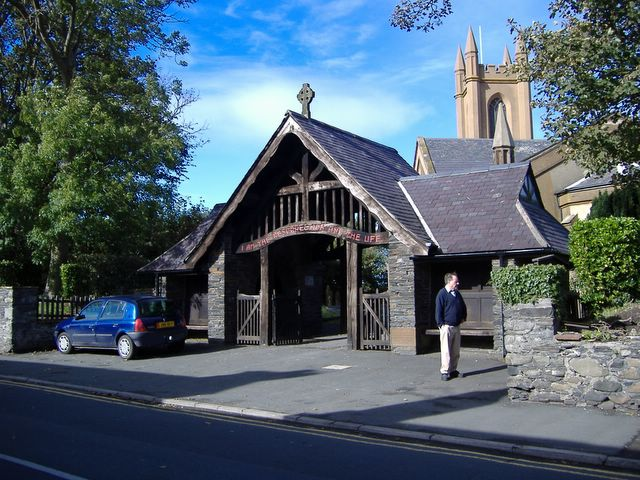
Lychgate

== Twin towns ==
Ghamrang, Nepal
