= Ramsey railway station (Isle of Man Railway) =

Former railway station in Isle of Man, UK

Coordinates: 54.322°N 4.387°W

Ramsey Railway Station Stashoon Raad-Yiarn Rhumsaa
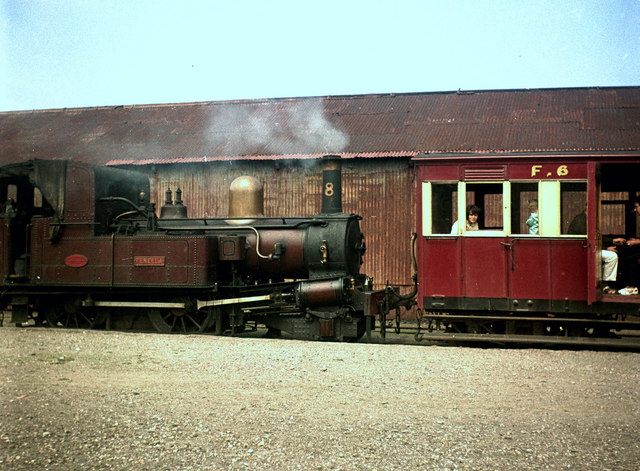

General information
- Location: Bowring Road, Ramsey, Isle of Man
- System: The Isle of Man Railway Co., Ltd. The Manx Northern Railway Co., Ltd.
- Owner: Isle of Man Railway
- Line: Ramsey Line
- Platforms: Two Half-Height, One Ground Level

Construction
- Parking: Roadside

History
- Opened: 23 September 1879
- Closed: 6 September 1968
Location

Ramsey Station (Manx: Stashoon Raad Yiarn Rhumsaa) was a station on the Manx Northern Railway, later owned and operated by the Isle of Man Railway; it served the town of Ramsey in the Isle of Man, and was the terminus of a line that ran between St. John's and this station, which was the railway's headquarters. The station opened to traffic on 23 September 1879.

== Route ==
Preceding station	Disused railways	Following station
Lezayre towards St. John's	Manx Northern Railway later Isle of Man Railway	Terminus

== Description ==
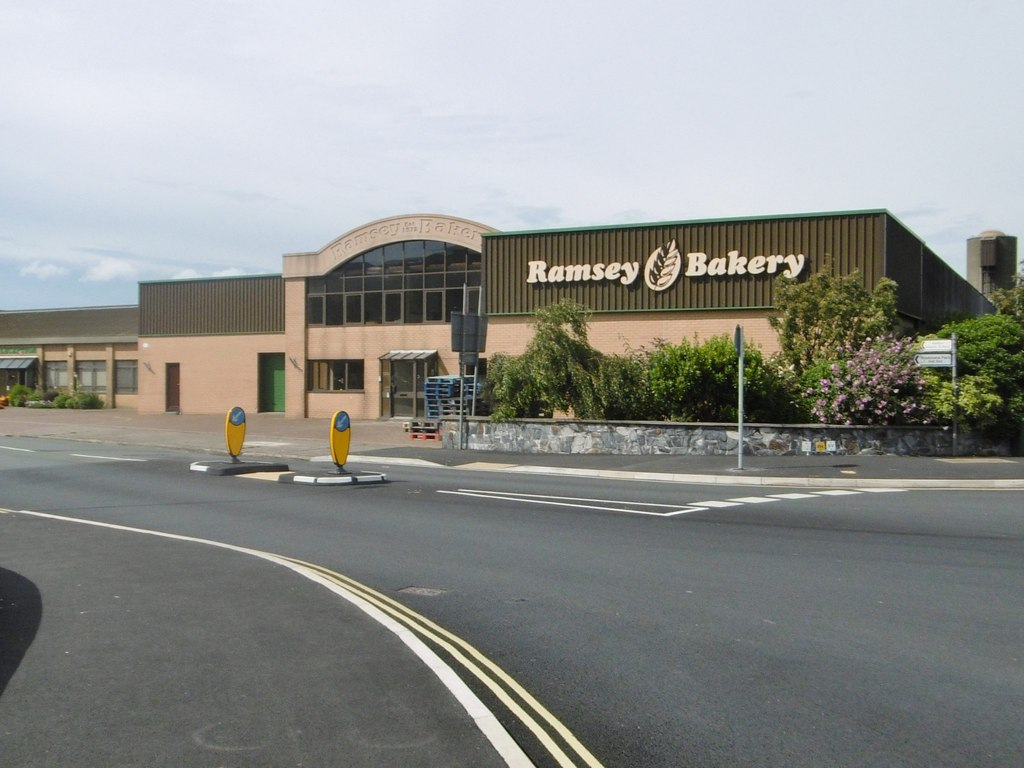
The town's bakery (now closed) which was constructed on the site after demolition of the station in 1978.

The site was provided with an imposing station building, an Italianate one-storey structure unlike any other railway building on the island. It was accompanied by a stone-built locomotive shed and workshop, corrugated iron carriage shed, water tower and various stone-built goods sheds and warehouses. The station befitted its status as the headquarters of the railway company, but after the merger in 1905 with the Isle of Man Railway Company the interior of the main station was modified, the office space being surplus to requirements: all administration was undertaken at Douglas Station from then on. The station had its own separate ladies' and gentlemen's waiting rooms and refreshments facilities, although the latter closed relatively early in the line's history. The workshop behind the engine shed was also closed and stripped of its equipment around 1905. Like most Manx stations, it never had full-sized platforms, but there were half-height ones reaching as far as the bottom running board of the coaches. On the south side of the main platform there was also a long bay platform. In common with most of the island's railway system, points and signals were not fully interlocked, but controlled by individual hand levers. Therefore there was no signal box or groundframe.

== Extensions ==
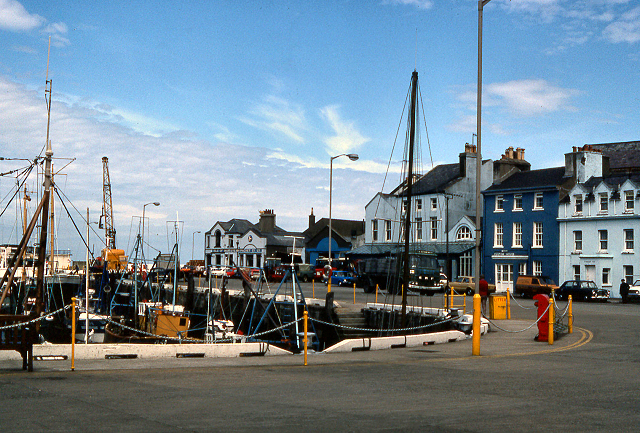
The site of the extent of the harbour extension in modern times

=== Harbour Tramway ===
At one time there was a branch that spurred off from the northern edge of the station and passed behind the carriage shed and the goods yard and on to the harbour side, terminating near the market square. This branch was used exclusively for wagons carrying ore from Foxdale Mines to ships for transport to Great Britain and Ireland, and ran parallel to the road; at one time it stretched as far as the site of today's Ellan Vannin public house at the far corner of the square. The extension was positioned directly along the quayside, making it convenient for direct loading and unloading onto boats. During the 1930s it was in decline, though sections of rail remained in situ for a number of years after that. In 1988 a commemorative stamp featuring an artist's impression of a train on this extension was issued by the Isle of Man Post Office as part of a set showing old railway and tramway views of the island.

=== Milntown Power Station ===
There was a further extension to the south-west of the station at Milntown; this was installed in the railway's last year of operation in 1968 in an effort to increase rail traffic. Limited non-passenger services continued into 1969 when trains ran to collect oil wagons for delivery to Douglas; these were the very last services on this line.

== Operation ==
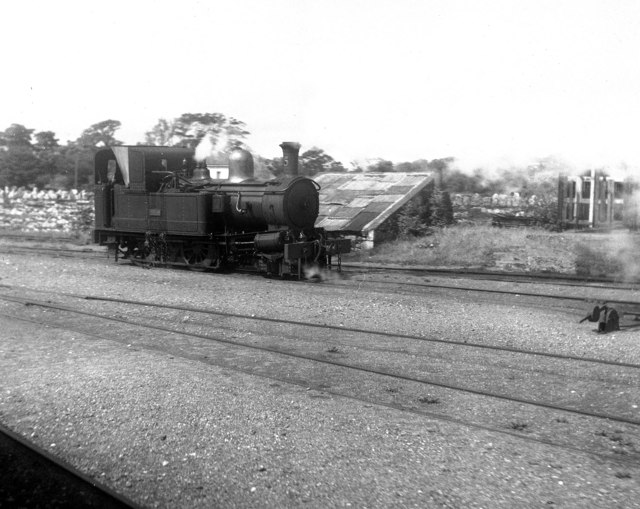
No.5 Mona in the goods yard at the station in 1962 showing the array of sidings, one of which extended to the quayside to the rear of the carriage shed.

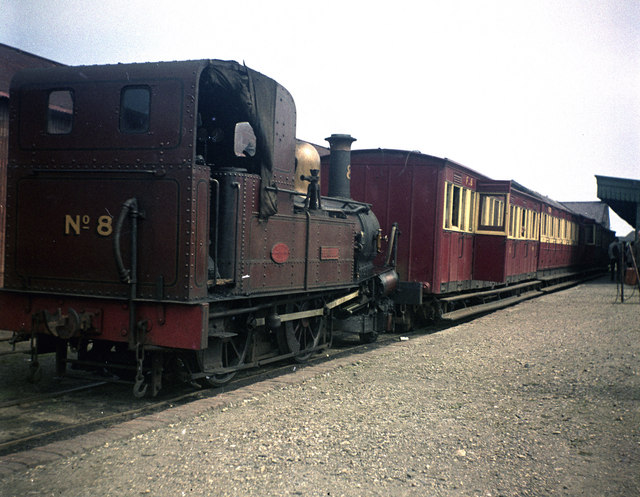
No.8 Fenella at the station in 1964; this locomotive was a regular performer on the north line and was regularly shedded here for many years

=== Services ===
Under the original Manx Northern Railway operations, trains ran to St. John's, where there was a junction with the Isle of Man Railway's Peel to Douglas line. Some trains continued on to Douglas by agreement with the other company, and by 1888 when the northern company was struggling financially, the larger company took responsibility for all operational activities, ultimately taking over the whole line in 1905. Owing to the close proximity of the railway-owned Glen Wyllin Pleasure Grounds some services terminated at Kirk Michael from here. After the merger, through services to Douglas and stations on the south line were offered. During the wars the north line was busy with troop carrying trains which started from here.

=== Decline ===
The station was located on the outer edges of the town, and even on the railway's busiest days it would often appear to be deserted; in later years the station's wooden canopy, which adjoined the building, developed a distinct sag, and the buildings took on a somewhat abandoned appearance. Passenger services declined rapidly in the 1950s and became seasonal in 1960. Even at the height of the summer season, there were only two or three return workings between Ramsey and St John's and Douglas. By the 1960s goods traffic centred on the cattle dock, which ran along the northern edge of the station alongside the Sulby River and was still in frequent use. The complete closure of the Isle of Man Railway from November 1965 to June 1967 meant that movement of cattle ceased at that time. The local cattle mart was the busiest on the island, and provided much traffic for the railway, giving it some of its longest dedicated goods trains.

=== Closure ===
The station closed to passengers on 6 September 1968 but certain freight services operated the following year. After closure, the station remained largely intact, but the rails were lifted in 1975 for scrap and the whole site flattened in 1978 to make way for what is now Ramsey Bakery, making the site almost unrecognisable today although the road on which the bakery now stands is still known as Station Road.

== Other ==
A calendar and set of postcards were issued in 2010 featuring watercolour views of the station and its environs, accompanied by a book by local artist Michael Starkey with historical information by Julian Edwards.

== See also ==
- Isle of Man Railway stations
- Manx Northern Railway
- Ramsey Plaza Station
- Ramsey

== Sources ==
- Isle of Man Steam Railway Supporters' Association
