= Isle of Man Railway stations =

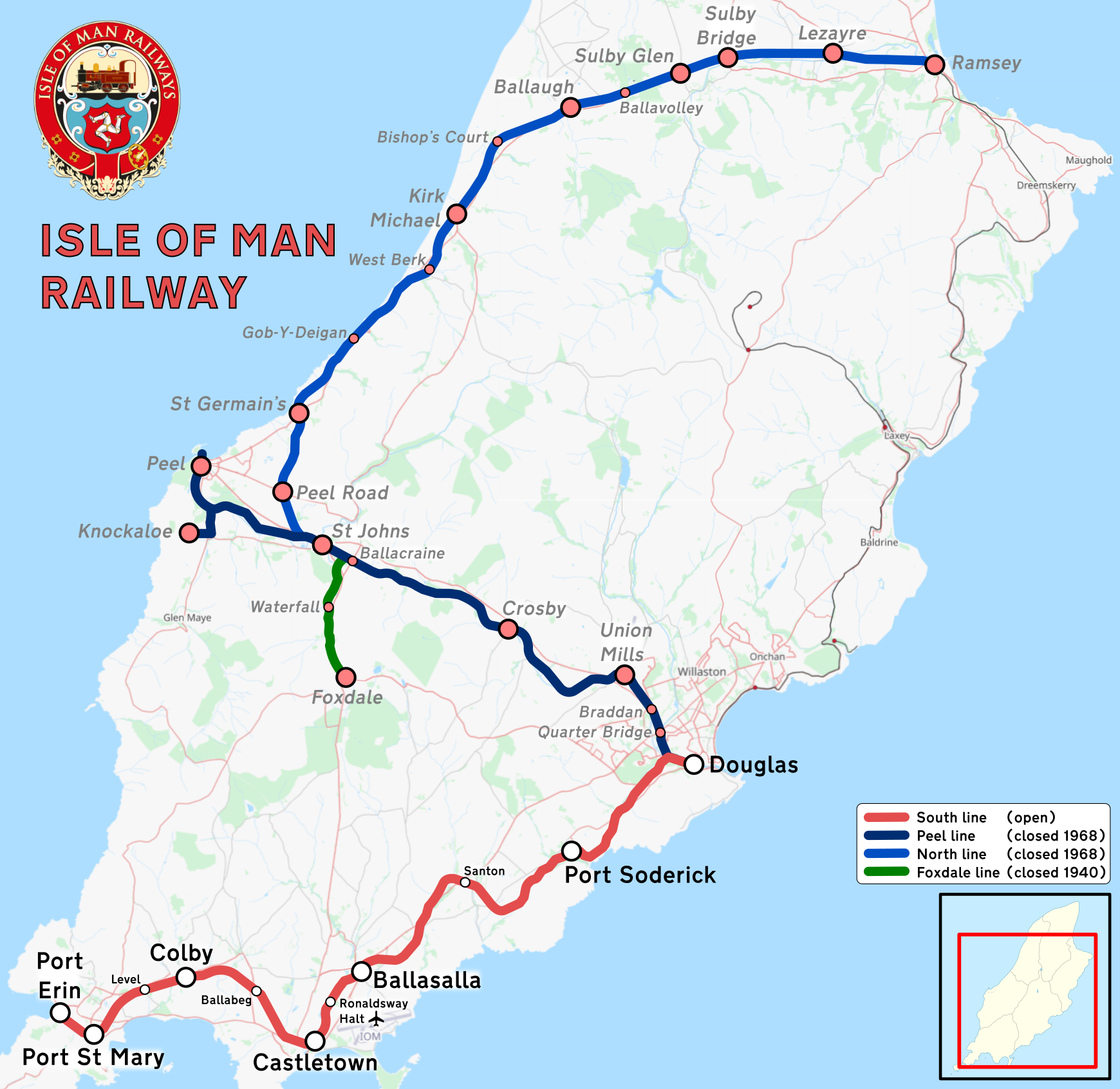
System map (Click to expand)

This article details each of the lines operated by the Isle of Man Railway, including the original line to Peel in the west, opened in 1873, followed by the Port Erin line the following year (which is still fully operational today), as well as the Manx Northern Railway's line between St John's and Ramsey and the Foxdale Railway's line between St John's and Foxdale. (The last two of these were independent companies bought out in 1905 by the Isle of Man Railway Company.)

== The South Line (open) ==
Point	Coordinates (Links to map resources)	OS Grid Ref	Notes
Douglas	54.1478°N 4.4861°W	SC3764575314	
Port Soderick	54.1265°N 4.5384°W	SC3423673010	
Santon	54.1182°N 4.5841°W	SC3112772254	
Ballasalla	54.0961°N 4.6288°W	SC2801969908	
Ronaldsway	54.0881°N 4.6425°W	SC2718769047	
Castletown	54.0787°N 4.6488°W	SC2669468040	
Ballabeg	54.0911°N 4.6739°W	SC2514769459	
Colby	54.0944°N 4.7042°W	SC2318269905	
The Level	54.0914°N 4.7211°W	SC2206169608	
Port St Mary	54.081°N 4.743°W	SC2058568508	
Port Erin	54.085°N 4.758°W	SC1962168991	

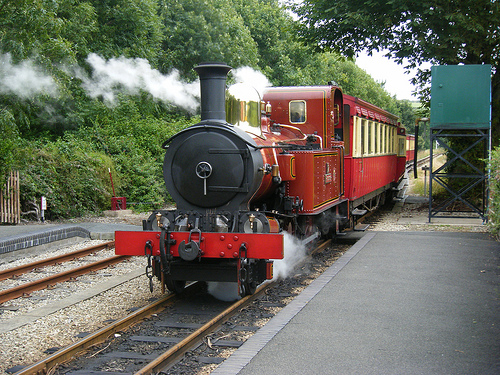
No. 12 Hutchinson (1908) enters Santon Station

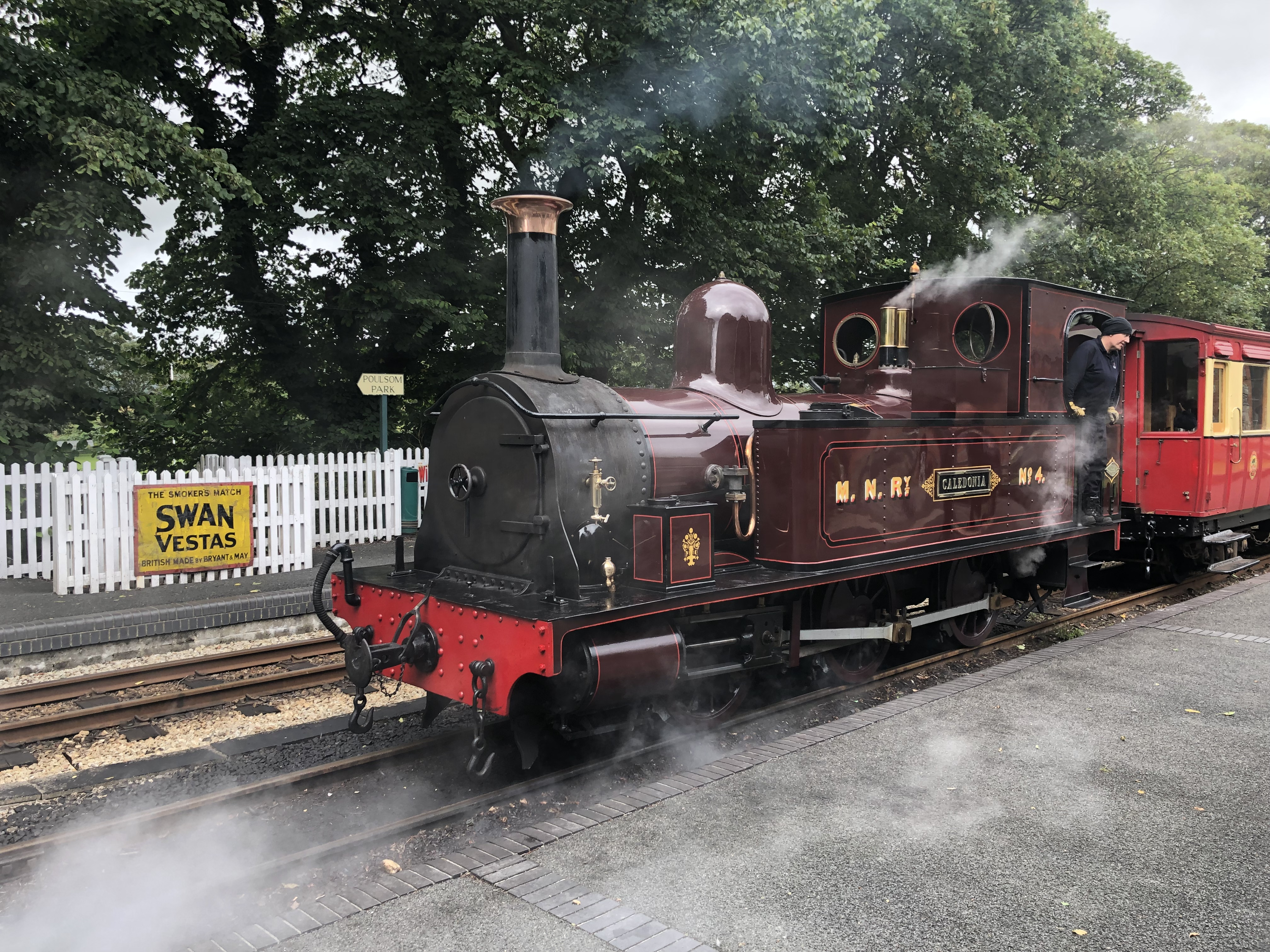
M.N.Ry. No.4 Caledonia of 1885 Castletown Station

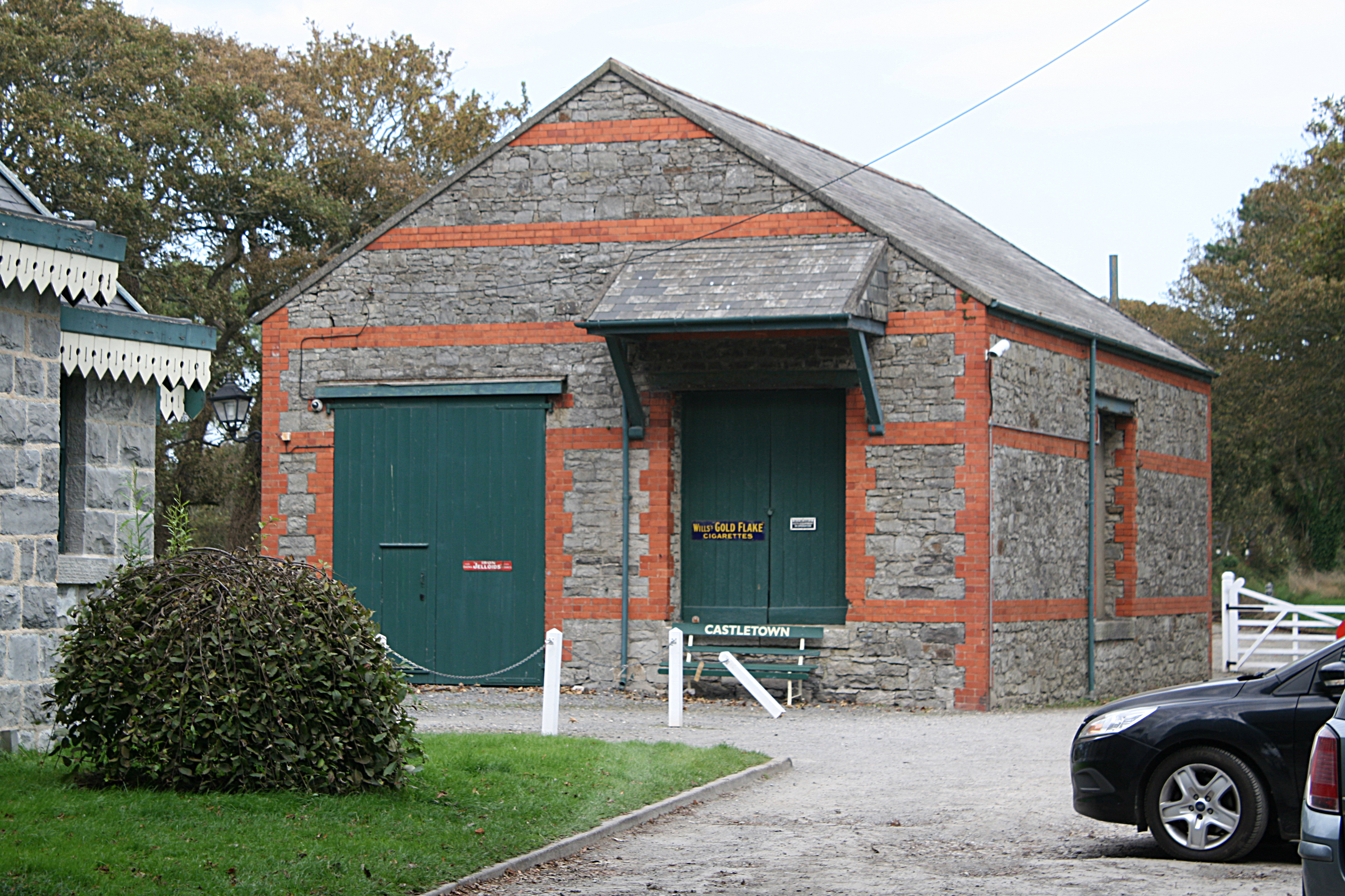
Castletown Station Goods Shed

The line to Port Erin was the second to be opened by the railway company, in 1874: one year after the shorter line to Peel had been opened. This line's construction involved considerably more civil engineering work than the relatively straightforward westerly line, including two major rock cuttings on the climb out of Douglas railway station at "The Nunnery" and Keristal. The story goes that the work nearly bankrupted the contractors, and the second cutting was completed on a much smaller budget, resulting in it being far narrower than the first, something that is apparent when travelling today. On the approach to Santon the line reaches its summit, and the remaining outward leg of the journey is spent descending or on the flat. The southern section runs through farmland, and has several farm crossings, some of which were staffed. This is shown by stone structures for crossing keepers, but these were all made redundant in 2001 with the introduction of automated barriers. There are many smaller crossings also giving local farmers access to fields. The principal stations on the south line which remain open today are as listed to the right; of these, Santon, Ronaldsway Halt, Ballabeg and Colby Level remain as request stops only, whilst all service trains stop at the other stations listed. In the past there have been other request stops at Ballacostain between Port Soderick and Santon, which served the rifle range used by pupils from King William's College near Castletown. In recent years a new overbridge was installed at Meary Veg in 2001 as part of an island-wide sewerage system. On the climb out of Douglas a farm named Lough Ned operated for a short time in the 1980s as a small wildlife park, and the railway served this with a ground-level platform.

== The Peel Line (closed) ==
Point	Coordinates (Links to map resources)	OS Grid Ref	Notes
Peel	54.2219°N 4.6974°W	SC2416584063	
Knockaloe railway station and branch line	54.2055°N 4.7038°W	SC2367882255	
Knockaloe Internment Camp	54.2054°N 4.7046°W	SC2362882240	
St John's	54.2012°N 4.6415°W	SC2772281623	
Ballacraine	54.1986°N 4.6325°W	SC2830081313	
Crosby	54.182°N 4.566°W	SC3256879306	
Union Mills	54.169°N 4.52°W	SC3551777752	
Braddan Bridge § Railway halt	54.1615°N 4.5056°W	SC36507686	
Quarterbridge Crossing	54.1558°N 4.5017°W	SC3666176245	
Douglas	54.1478°N 4.4861°W	SC3764575314	

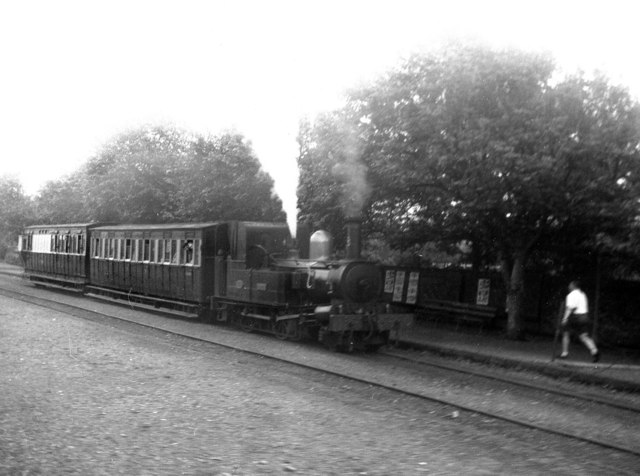
St. John's Station

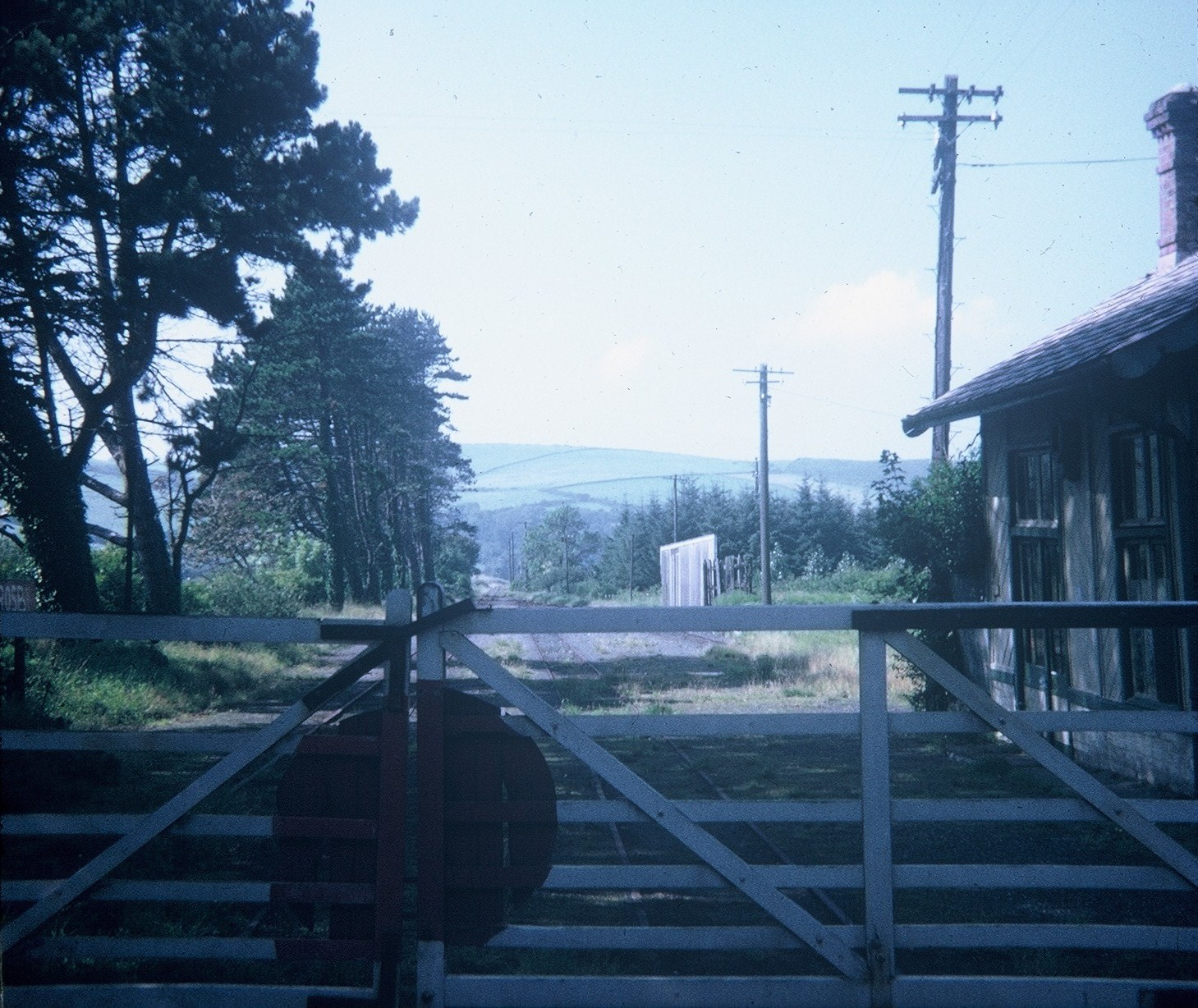
Crosby Station

This was the first railway line to be opened on the island in 1873, and was operational continuously (with the exception of 1966) until September 1968, when the entire network was closed. The line is today retained as a footpath and bridleway and is 11.5 miles (18.5 km) long. Since the rails were lifted in 1975, there has often been talk of resurrecting this line, which would be the most viable out of the closed lines. Since closure there have been several service mains buried under the trackbed, including gas and telephone mains, but care is always taken to ensure that the trackbed is returned in such a way that the railway could be reinstated. There are two notable examples of this:

- at Quarterbridge where the railway ran parallel to the T.T. course, and an access road was built on the trackbed in 1991, and
- at the station of St John's, where a primary school and housing complex have been developed since 2001.

Both of these developments have been built in such a way to ensure the line could be reinstated, although any station at St John's would have to be significantly relocated.

During the First World War there was a branch extending from a mid-way point between Peel and St John's stations to the farm of Knockaloe in connection with prisoners of war who were interned there. The stations are listed to the right. At the terminus of Peel a large heritage centre has been built, partly using the old goods shed and station building. The brickworks office and water tower remain in place at the mouth of the yard and are occupied by the Manx Transport Museum Group, and the station site itself is now a car park for the heritage centre. But it would be feasible to reinstate some form of station here in the future if required.

== The North Line (closed) ==
Point	Coordinates (Links to map resources)	OS Grid Ref	Notes
Ramsey station	54.322°N 4.387°W	SC4477294468	
Lezayre	54.325°N 4.429°W	SC4205394895	
Sulby Bridge	54.324°N 4.472°W	SC3925394881	
Sulby Glen	54.319°N 4.491°W	SC3799894368	
Ballavolley Halt	54.315°N 4.517°W	SC3629293984	
Ballaugh	54.31°N 4.541°W	SC3471193483	
Bishop's Court	54.3036°N 4.5703°W	SC3278192842	
Kirk Michael	54.284°N 4.587°W	SC3161490701	
West Berk	54.2713°N 4.5998°W	SC3072889321	
Gob-y-Deigan	54.253°N 4.633°W	SC2849187364	
St. Germain's	54.236°N 4.654°W	SC2705385524	
Peel Road	54.215°N 4.66°W	SC2657483203	
St John's	54.2012°N 4.6415°W	SC2772281623	

Ballaugh Station

Sulby Glen Station

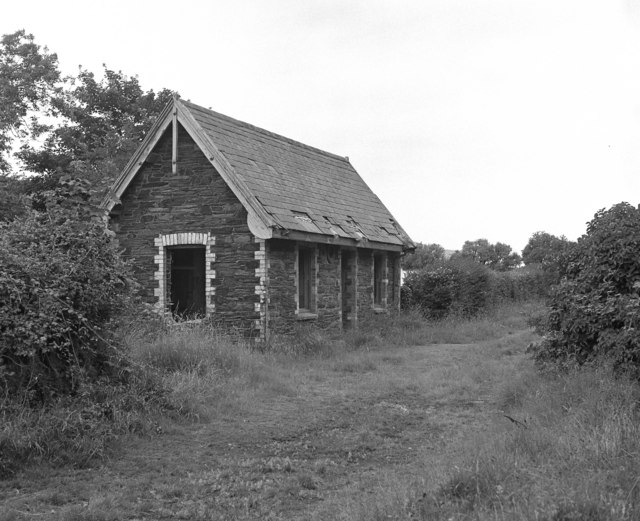
Lezayre Station

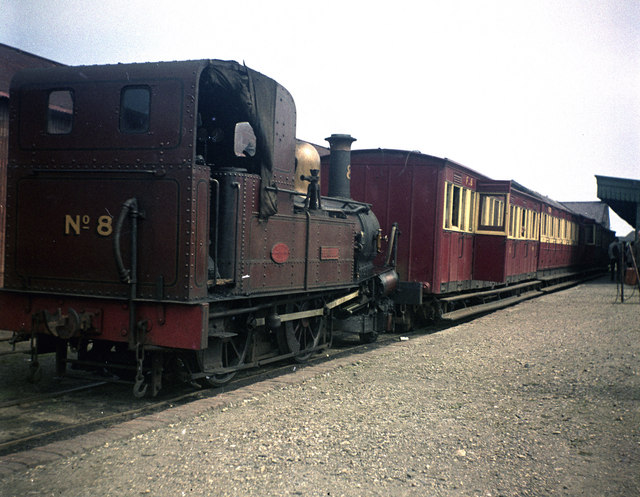
Ramsey Station

The line from Ramsey to St John's was opened by the Manx Northern Railway in 1879, and operated until 1968, when passenger operations ceased on the same day as those on the Peel line. By far the most scenic route operated by the railway, it featured two viaducts at Glen Wyllin and Glen Mooar and was nearly 17 miles (27 km) in length. The railway ran independently until 1905 when the Isle of Man Railway took over operations, together with the amalgamation of the Foxdale Railway, thereby controlling the entire steam railway network on the island. Sections of this line along the Irish Sea coast suffered some cruel weather, and a turntable was installed at St John's to turn coaching stock to ensure even weathering on the most exposed section at the "Donkey Bank" which caused trouble for the operators throughout its lifetime. Trains were often dispatched with wagonloads of ash to deposit over the side to shore up the line, and the line has fallend considerably since the railway closed. Further along the line at Glen Wyllin were pleasure gardens owned and operated by the railway company, and these became a popular destination for Sunday School picnics in the railway's heyday, providing a source of income for the railway. The nearest station at Kirk Michael was the drop off point for holidaymakers who walked along a track to the side of the line. At Ballavolley a halt was created in 1967 to serve the newly opened Wildlife Park, which remains open today. There was also a wayside halt for the exclusive use of the Bishop of Sodor and Mann at Bishopscourt, which comprised a simple bench seat and hand-operated signal to stop passing trains. The terminus station at Ramsey was on the site of today's Ramsey Bakery on the outskirts of the town, a disadvantage when compared with the station of the Manx Electric Railway which is in the heart of the town. The station did however boast an extension along the quayside for a time, ideally situated to load and unload goods to and from the vessels in this busy port. Also, as part of an initiative to encourage the railway's use for freight and cargo, a small sharply-curved siding was laid to Milntown Power Station in 1968 and three wagons converted to oil carrying wagons for this purpose. The venture was however short-lived, but trains serving this siding were some of the very last recorded trains to travel over the line, in 1969 as part of a rolling stock collection. Today, it is difficult to visualise the station, as the site has been modernised and developed beyond recognition.

== The Foxdale Line (closed) ==
Point	Coordinates (Links to map resources)	OS Grid Ref	Notes
St John's	54.2012°N 4.6415°W	SC2772281623	
Waterfall	54.18°N 4.642°W	SC2760179267	
Foxdale	54.17°N 4.636°W	SC2795178140	

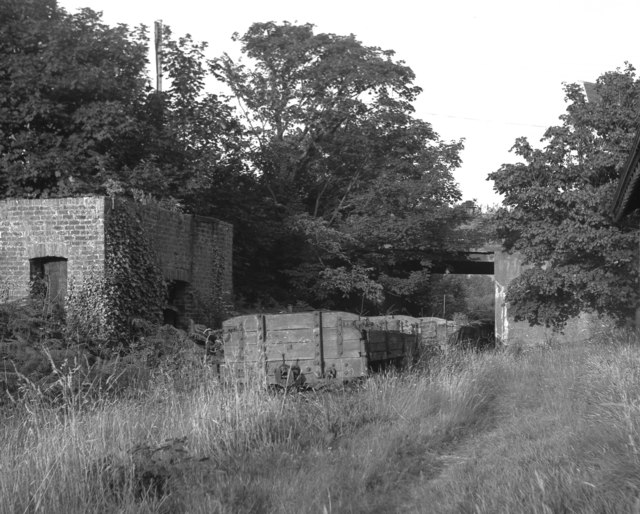
St. John's (Foxdale) Station

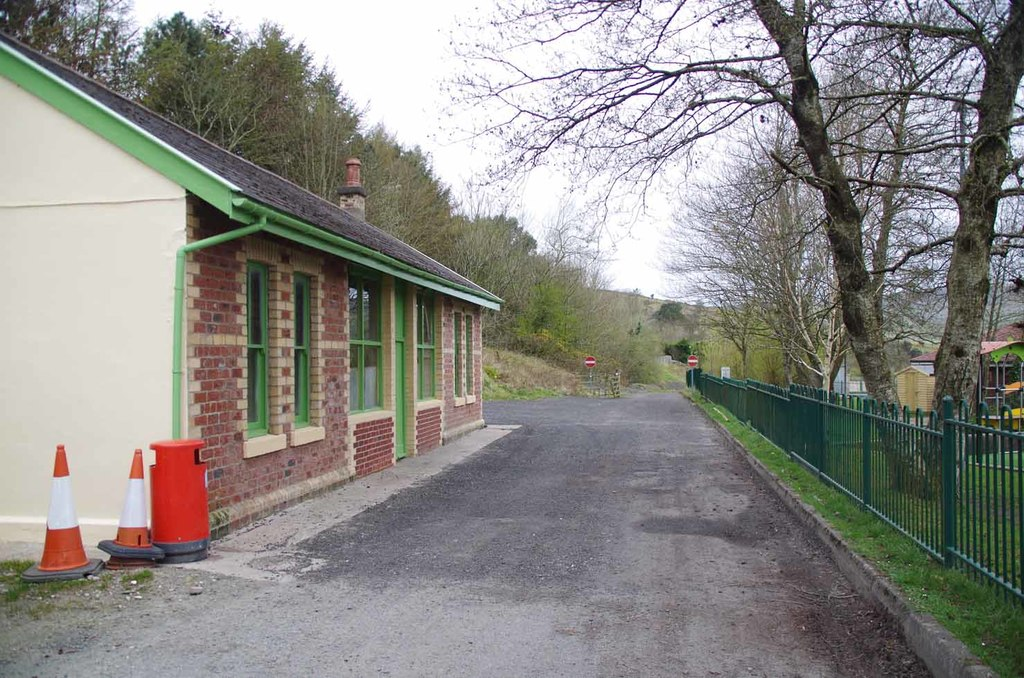
Foxdale Station

Opened in 1886, this was the shortest branch of the Isle of Man Railway and the shortest-lived, closing as early as 1940 to all traffic. It was originally a separate affair from the other railways, but was taken over as part of the merger in 1905 together with the Manx Northern Railway to Ramsey. The tracks remained in situ for many years, and there are reports that trains, or light engines, travelled along its length as late as 1974 (just before lifting). The line was only 3 miles (4.8 km) long, but was on a steady climb of 1 in 49 for its entirety and it served the small mining community with limited passenger services (only one passenger coach was ever acquired and this remains in service on the preserved south line today, as F.39).

The station at Foxdale itself was also the site of the iron ore "deads" which gave rise to the station acquiring the nickname "the back of the moon" owing to its lunar appearance. Today the station building remains in place in private ownership but the removal of two vital bridges in the 1970s has rendered it extremely unlikely that any proposal to restore the line would ever be successful. There is evidence (in the form of images) to suggest however that Foxdale Station may well retain some of its track to the present day - albeit buried under heaps of spoil. Until recently (within the last ten years) there was still trackwork visible from the road beyond the station which would have run up onto the spoil heaps for working the deads.

== See also ==
- Isle of Man Railway level crossings and points of interest
- Isle of Man Railway Museum
- Isle of Man Steam Railway Supporters' Association
