= Union Mills railway station =

Former railway station in Isle of Man, UK

Union Mills Railway Station Stashoon Raad-Yiarn Mwyllin Doo Aah
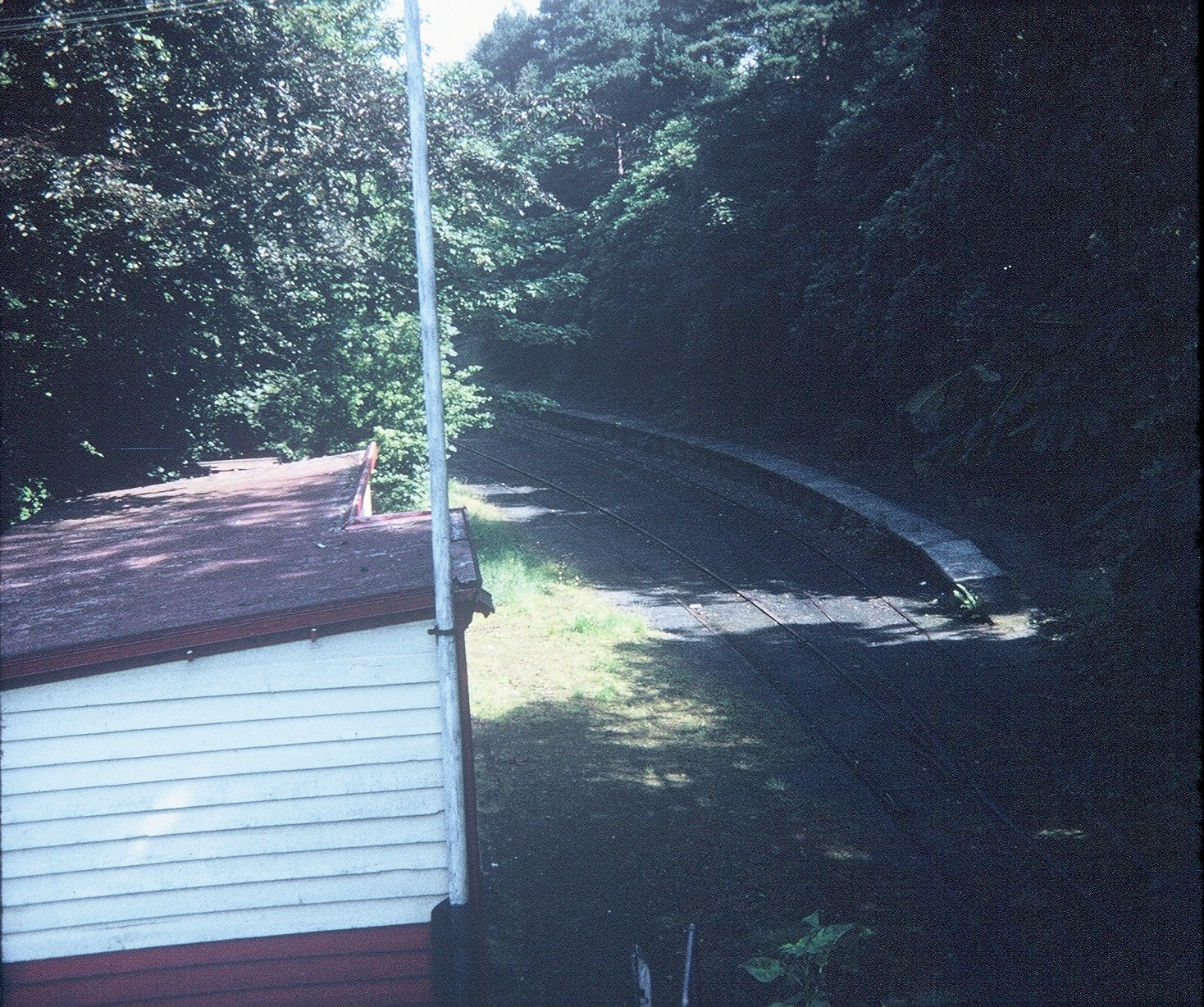

General information
- Coordinates: 54.16962°N 4.52225°W
- System: The Isle of Man Railway Co., Ltd.
- Owner: Isle Of Man Railway Co.
- Line: Peel Line
- Platforms: Raised, "Up" Only
- Tracks: Running Lines & Sidings

Construction
- Structure type: Cattle Dock
- Parking: Roadside

History
- Opened: 1 July 1873
- Closed: 22 May 1961; (reopened 3 June 1967 - 9 September 1968)
- Rebuilt: 1892 (Timber Structure)

Services
Toilets, Waiting Room, Booking Facilities
Location

Union Mills Railway Station (Manx: Stashoon Raad Yiarn Wyllin Doo Aah) was an intermediate stop on the Isle of Man Railway; it served the village of Union Mills in the Isle of Man and was a stopping place on a line that ran between Douglas and Peel. It was part of the island's first railway line and the first official stopping place.

== Locale ==
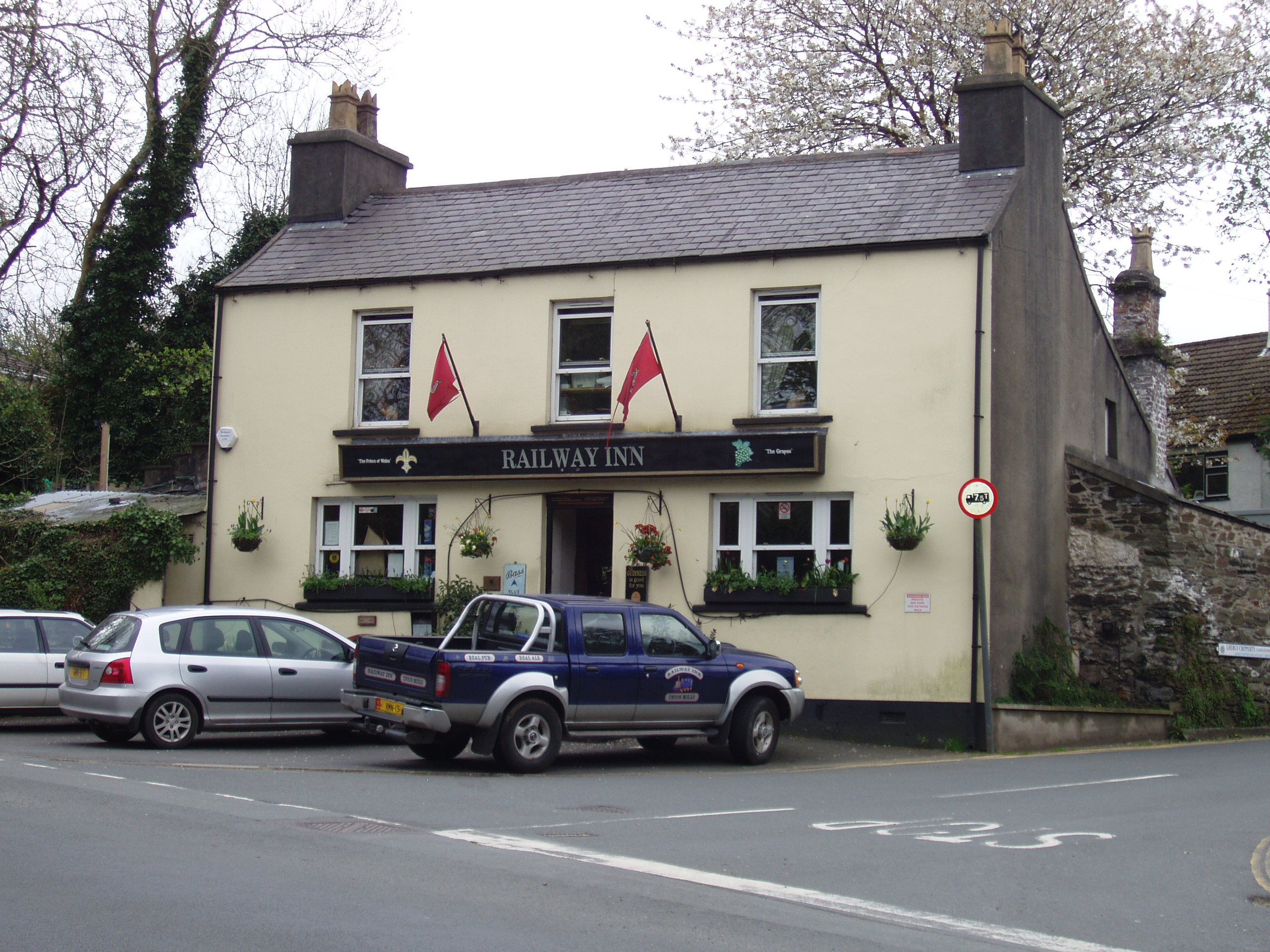
The Railway Inn in 2003, also known as The Grapes just above the site of the station.

On the northerly side of the station runs the River Dhoo and the station had a long passing loop and at one time a goods siding. When the railway closed the station building was demolished and the tracks lifted but the platform remains in place, as do the words of the station name, picked out in white spar stones along the edge of what was the down line, and a Legs of Mann in the embankment at the exit to the station. At the top of the station steps lay the Railway Inn which remains open today. When the railway arrived it had been called The Grapes but it was soon changed to the Railway Inn, a title it retains today, being a popular vantage point for viewing the T.T. races. The village's general store (now a Spar shop) was at one time run by the Bee Gees mother, a blue plaques on the wall denotes this, installed in 2001. Close to the station site there is a Methodist church and within walking distance are two campsites, one at Glenlough Farm and also at Union Mills Football Club which today is close to the new Nobles Hospital, having relocated from the village in 1999.

== Layout ==
The station was established as the first official stopping place for trains on the line when it opened in 1873. The village at that time was an important trading point previously served only by horse and cart from the capital of Douglas. It was the arrival of the railway that saw the small hamlet expand over several years to become a larger village. From 1905-1907 it boasted a long winding full-height platform on the "up" side serviced trains westward bound; originally fitted with minimal passenger facilities, including a diminutive timber sentry box for the pointsman at the easterly end, it was later fitted with a long passing loop for trains and a variety of cattle pens and sidings, feeding off the westward platform, though in an easterly direction. Being a largely exposed area when established, the planting of a variety of plants (notably rhododendrons) in the earliest years of the railway meant that it was a largely shaded area. It lies beneath the main road and was accessed via a set of steps, to a wooden station building and platform area. The station closed in 1961 but was reopened in 1967 and was finally closed with the railway in 1968.

== Buildings & Gardens ==
The timber station building here was the only one of its kind on the railway and was erected in 1892 at the westerly end of the station close to the entrance. It had a sloping roof with passenger shelter and basic staff facilities. It fell out of use after the second world war when the next station at Crosby was favoured for the passing of services, although remained in periodic use until the closure of the railway. It was demolished in 1977 by Prisoners from the IOM Prison. Between 1974 and 1976 the rails and sleepers were lifted from the site, leaving only the platform in situ. A wooden sentry box protected the station's easterly end in the earliest years of the railway. The station gardens were well-known locally for their beautiful displays that were tended by the station master and his staff. The station was often awarded the prize for best-kept station on the entire network and was featured in many popular picture postcards of the era.

== Accidents ==
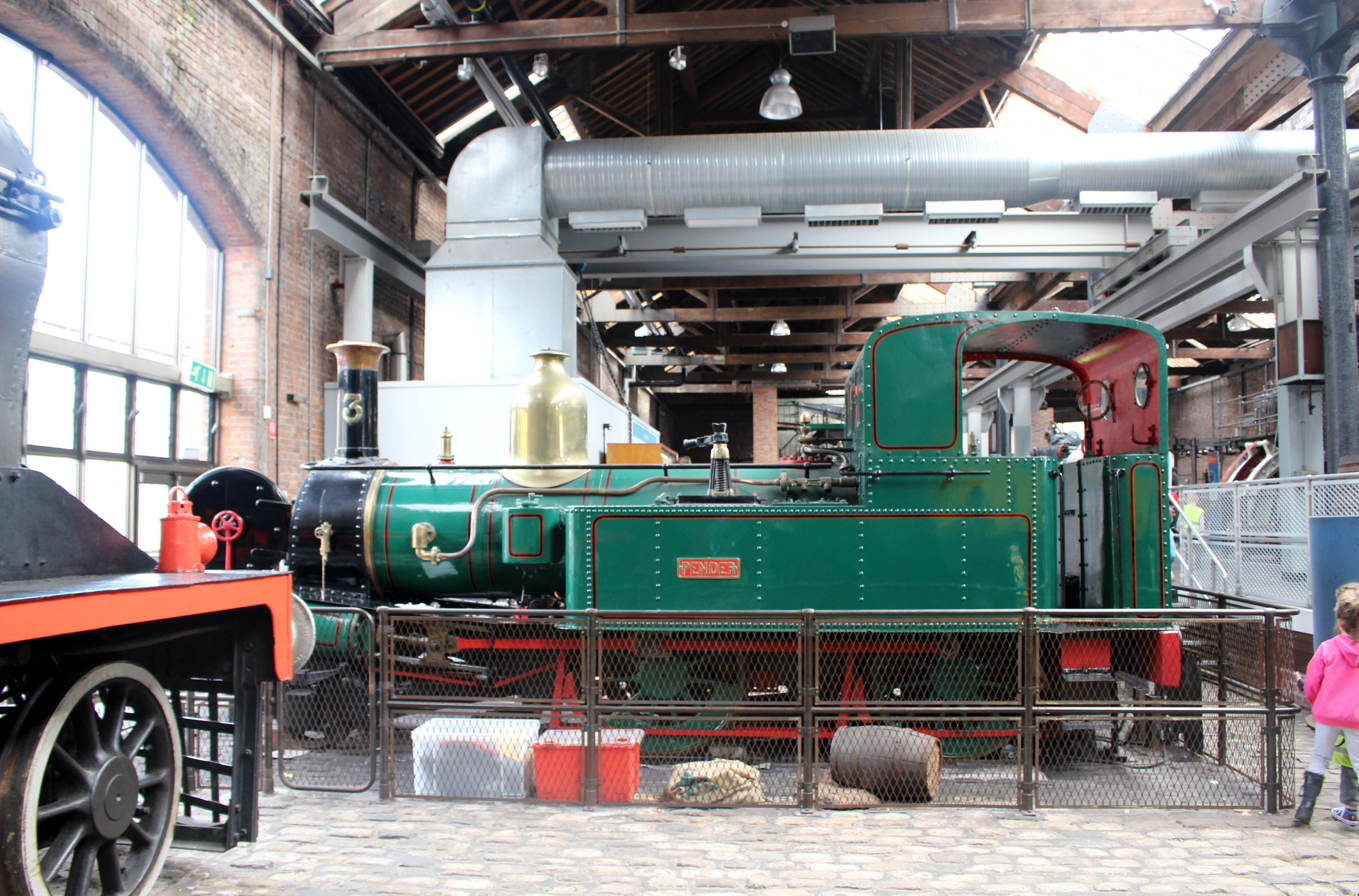
Built for the opening of the line in 1873, No.3 Pender which was involved in the 1925 accident, now in the Science Museum in Manchester as a sectionalised exhibit to illustrate the workings of a steam locomotive; it left the island in 1979 and was not selected for return to use owing to the damage sustained in the accident, having last operated in 1962.

=== 1925 ===
A Douglas-bound train failed to collect the guard/brakesman upon setting off from Union Mills resulting in the train, hauled by No.3 Pender having insufficient braking capability upon arrival at the terminus; it crashed through the buffer stops at Douglas and the fireman was killed. This was the most notable accident in the railway's history.

=== 1947 ===
Long-term station master, 82 year old George Hogg, was killed at the station when he fell between two carriages as a train pulled away from the station on 14 July 1947.

=== 1967 ===
The station was the site of a head-on collision between two trains, this largely being put down to the inexperience of the new operator of the railway, Lord Ailsa; No.10 G.H. Wood and No.5 Mona were damaged by the incident, the latter receiving buckled main frames. It was not until No.10 was withdrawn in 2017 that work commenced on rectifying the damage.

== Filming Usage ==
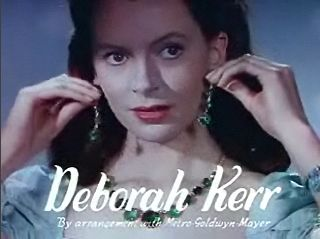
Deborah Kerr, star of the film

=== I See A Dark Stranger ===
In 1946 the opening scenes of the film I See a Dark Stranger were filmed in and around the station which doubled for a station in Ireland; the scene saw one of the lead characters boarding a train here, being double-headed by locomotives No.12 Hutchinson and No.13 Kissack, both of which survive in service today, with No.12 withdrawn for overhaul as at May 2024. The following scene shows a completely different train arriving at Dublin. Other locations on the island were also used for filming including the village itself, Castletown and the folk museum at Cregneash, all doubling for Ireland, despite the triskelion on the bank at the approach path being clearly visible in one scene.

=== Ivo Peters ===
Other notable filming that took place here includes the work of renowned railway photographer Ivo Peters who visited the island to record its transport networks in 1961, 1963 and 1968 and favoured this location for its picturesque backdrop of rhododendrons and other flora.

== Church Services ==
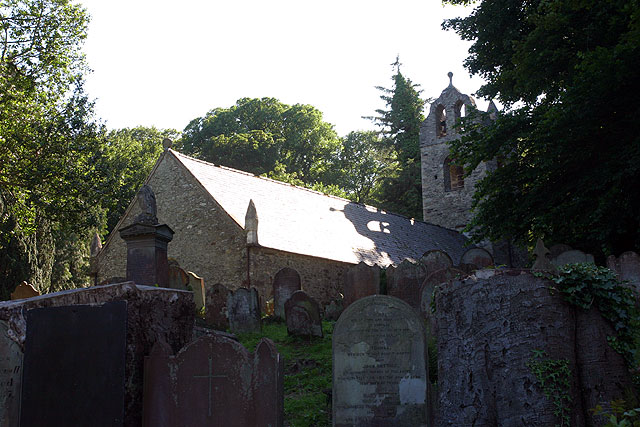

For many years, an open air church service took place at the nearby Braddan Church, which was served by its own Sundays-only request stop. Heavy trains from Douglas served these ceremonies until the final years of the railway, and trains would drop off their passengers at Kirk Braddan before carrying on to Union Mills so that locomotives could re-position to the opposite end of their trains before drawing forward to collect returning passengers.

With trains of twelve bogie carriage not uncommon on these services as well as supplemental services by the diesel raicars, this is one of the reasons the passing loop at the station was so long. The practice of dedicated church trains was still carried out until the summer of 1968 which proved to be the Peel Line's final year of operation, with buses taking over from the following year.

== Displays ==
=== Rail Trail ===
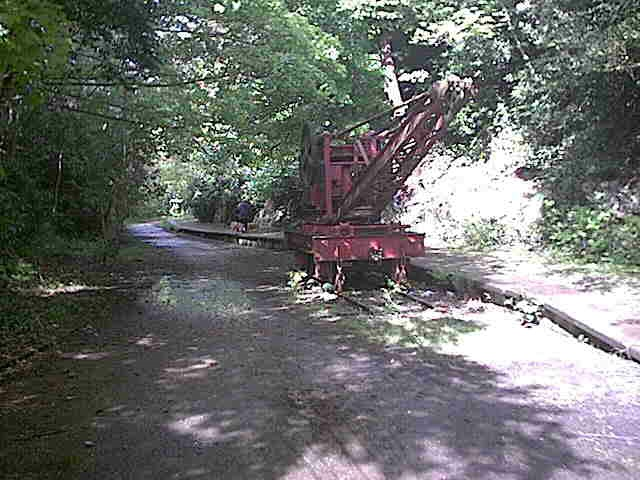
Crane No.2 displayed on the site of the station

In 1990 the Douglas-Peel trackbed was designated as the Rail Trail and much work undertaken to improve the station underfoot. It was at this time that the breakdown crane belonging to the railway was placed on permanent display at the station, and a section of track installed for it to sit on; the crane had been built by the Birmingham-based company of Richard C. Gibbins and delivered new to the railway in 1893, being stored at various locations prior to its removal to Union Mills in 1991 where it still remains today.

=== Running-In Board ===
To mark their fiftieth anniversary in 2016 the Isle of Man Steam Railway Supporters' Association, a local charity, erected a replica station name or "running-in" board on the platform beside the crane; an information panel on the site of the station building which is now a picnic area was also installed at the same time.

== Route ==
| Preceding station | Isle of Man Railway | Following station |
|---|---|---|
| Braddan Bridge towards; Douglas | Peel Line. | Crosby towards; Peel |

== Sources ==
- Isle of Man Steam Railway Supporters' Association

== See also ==
- Isle of Man Railway stations
- Union Mills
