= Ballacraine railway station =

Disused railway station in Isle of Man, UK

Coordinates: 54.19861°N 4.63248°W

Ballacraine Balley Craine
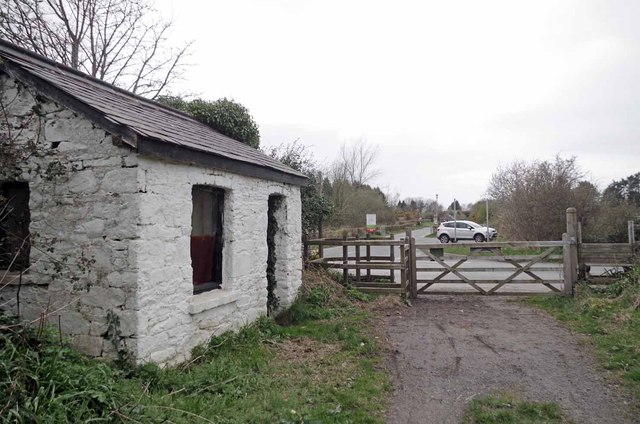
- Former crossing keeper's hut at Ballacraine station

General information
- Location: Foxdale Road, Glenfaba, Isle of Man, IM7 6KL.
- System: The Isle of Man Railway Co., Ltd.
- Owner: The Isle of Man Railway Co., Ltd.
- Lines: Peel Line; Between Douglas & Peel
- Platforms: One, Ground Level
- Tracks: One Running Line

Construction
- Structure type: Gatekeepers' Lodge
- Parking: Roadside

History
- Opened: 1 October 1876; 30 May 1927
- Closed: 31 October 1879; 30 September 1929; 9 September 1968 (As Crossing)
- Rebuilt: 1877
Location

Ballacraine Halt (Manx: Stadd Valley Craine) was an infrequent request stop on the Isle of Man Railway.

== Origins ==
Originally opened in 1876 the halt provided a stopping place for the short walk to Glen Helen until 1879. Later in 1927 the halt was used again mainly by spectators attending the TT Races at Ballacraine.

== Closure ==
The Douglas to Peel line closed in 1968 but this location ceased to be a halt in 1929; up until this time it featured infrequently in timetable literature and was only used as a somewhat unofficial drop-of point for spectators viewing the T.T. road races.

== The site today ==
The Steam Heritage Trail now passes through the site, and the former crossing keepers' lodge has been retained, now forming a shelter for walkers.

Preceding station	Historical railways	Following station
Crosby towards Douglas	Isle of Man Railway	St John's towards Peel

== See also ==
- Isle of Man Railway stations
- Ballacraine Halt on Subterranea
