= St. Germain's railway station =

Former railway station in Isle of Man, UK

St Germain's Keeill Charmane
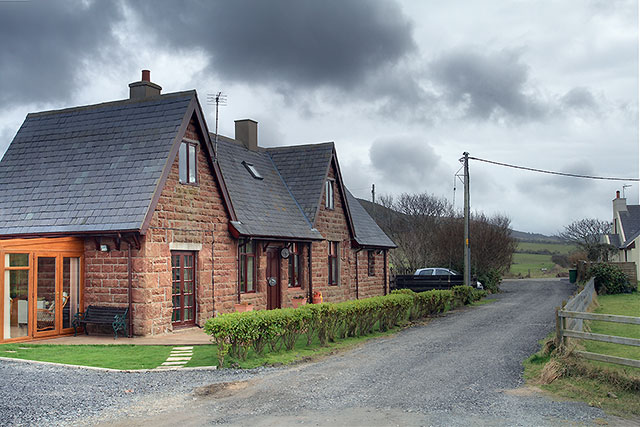

General information
- Location: German, Isle Of Man
- Coordinates: 54.236°N 4.654°W
- System: The Isle of Man Railway Co., Ltd. The Manx Northern Railway Co., Ltd.
- Owner: Isle of Man Railway Co.
- Line: North line
- Platforms: Two, ground level
- Tracks: Two, and sidings

Construction
- Structure type: Station building
- Parking: None provided

History
- Opened: 23 September 1879
- Closed: 30 July 1961
- Former names: Manx Northern Railway Co.

Passengers
- Passenger, livestock, freight

Services
Booking hall, waiting room, toilets
Location

St Germain's Railway Station (Manx: Stashoon Raad Yiarn Cheeill Charmane) was a station on the Manx Northern Railway in the Isle of Man, later owned and operated by the Isle of Man Railway; it served the small village of the same name and was an intermediate stopping place on a line that ran between St John's and Ramsey.

== Description ==
The station opened on 23 September 1879. Before Peel Road station opened, St Germain's was the preferred disembarkation point for Peel-bound passengers from the train from Ramsey. This was because it was far quicker to walk to Peel from here (about 1.5 miles), than to travel to St John's and change trains for Peel.

== Buildings ==
The distinctive station building is on the northern side of the small village; these days it serves as a private dwelling but its design clearly shows its origins as a station. Consisting of two tall gables and associated buildings, all constructed on local sandstone, it is of the same design as the stations at Ballaugh and Kirk Michael, both of which also still survive today.

== Closure and afterwards ==
This station was not latterly staffed, and although the passing loop was seldom used in later years it remained in place until closure in 1968. The station sits to the side of a main road and is still viewable today; the line has been converted into a footpath enabling access to the site.

== Route ==
Preceding station	Disused railways	Following station
Peel Road towards St John's	Manx Northern Railway later Isle of Man Railway	Gob-Y-Deigan towards Ramsey

== See also ==
- Isle of Man Railway stations
- Manx Northern Railway

== Sources ==
- [Isle of Man Steam Railway Supporters' Association]
