= Crosby railway station =

Former railway station in Isle of Man, UK

Coordinates: 54.182°N 4.566°W

Crosby Balley ny Croshey
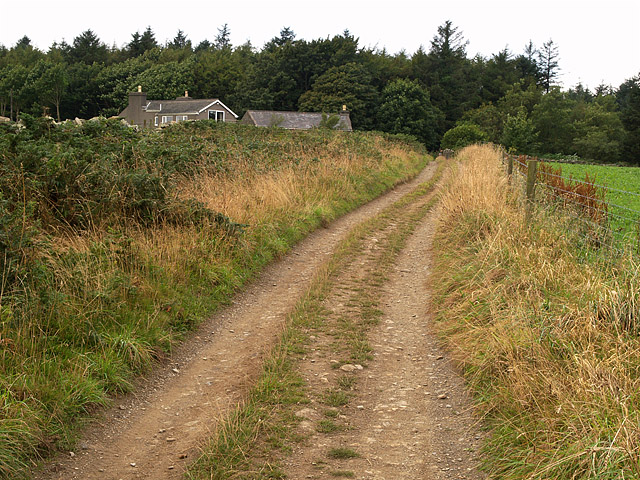

General information
- Location: Station Road, Crosby IM4 5ED.
- System: The Isle of Man Railway Co., Ltd.
- Owner: Isle Of Man Railway Co., Ltd.
- Line: Peel Line
- Platforms: Two, Ground Level
- Tracks: Two Running Lines & Various Sidings

Construction
- Structure type: Station Building & Goods Shed
- Parking: Roadside

History
- Opened: 1 July 1873
- Closed: 9 September 1968
- Rebuilt: 1902

Services
Toilets, Waiting Room, Booking Facilities
Location

Crosby Railway Station (Manx: Stashoon Raad Yiarn Valley ny Croshey) was an intermediate stop on the Isle of Man Railway; it served the village of Crosby in the Isle of Man and was a stopping place on a line that ran between Douglas and Peel. It was part of the island's first railway line.

== Description ==
This station boasted its own cattle dock, siding and station building, the latter of which was made to the same design as the station building at St John's. The station last operated in 1968. At the eastern end of the station, beyond the points of the passing loop, the line crossed the road to Ellerslie Depot and the stone crossing hut is all that survives of the railway infrastructure today.

== Closure ==
When the line closed, a group of lads from Merseyside removed the station nameboard and to this day it is believed to hang on the wall of the scout headquarters in the Liverpool suburb that shares its name.

== Environs ==
The site of the former station is now on the perimeter of the local playing fields at the bottom of a valley that shortly thereafter climbs steeply to the old schoolhouse, now a languages centre. The local Methodist chapel is located on the same road and since the line's closure a cricket pavilion and meeting rooms have been erected nearby. The public toilets for the village and war memorial also stand at the end of the road, which adjoins the world-famous T.T. course at its end.

== Route ==
Preceding station	Disused railways	Following station
Ballacraine towards Peel	Isle Of Man Railway; Peel Line	Union Mills towards Douglas

== See also ==
- Isle of Man Railway stations
- Crosby

== Sources ==
- [Isle of Man Steam Railway Supporters' Association]
