= Braddan Bridge =

Disused railway station in Isle of Man, UK

Coordinates: 54°09′41″N 4°30′21″W

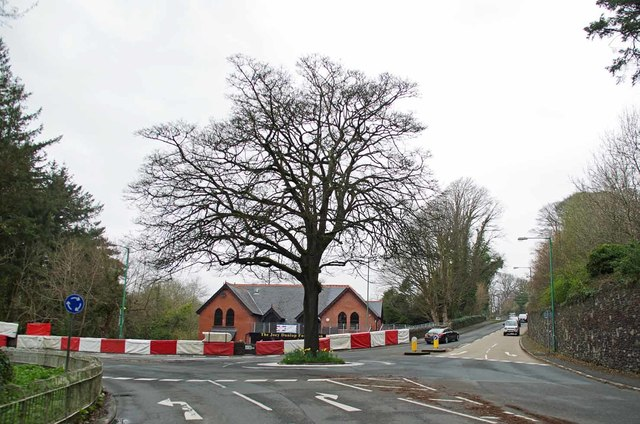
Joey Dunlop Foundation building behind the left bend at Braddan Bridge with red/white safety buffers on walled parapet

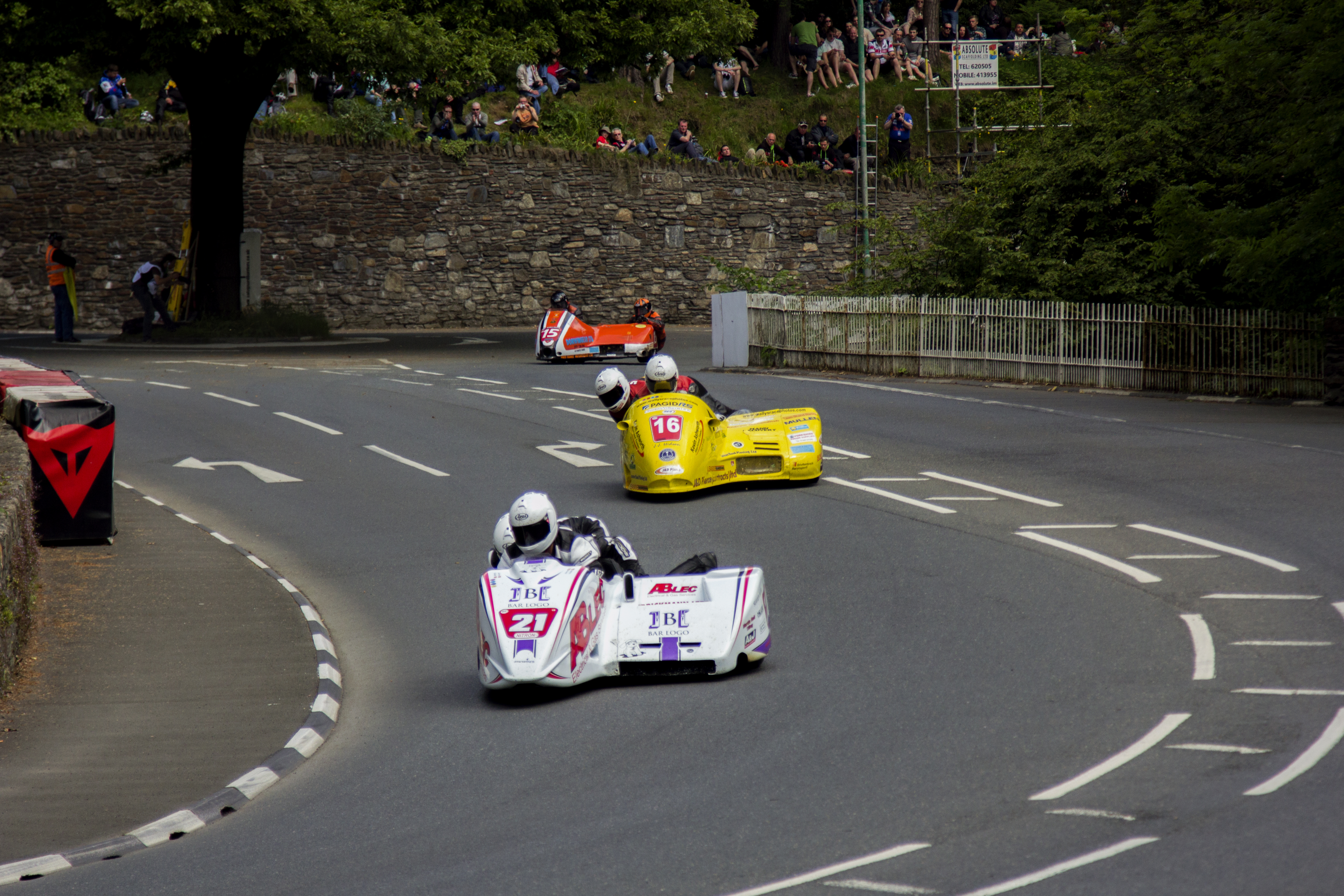
F2 Sidecar outfits about to turn right, showing the racing line through the 'S' bend at Braddan with other machines on the actual bridge over the river, having a railed parapet to the right and wall with over-run buffers to the left

Braddan Bridge (Irish: Naomh Breandán, Saint Brendan of Clonfert, the Navigator or the Voyager) is a bridge over the river Dhoo on the Douglas to Peel road, from which a halt on the Isle of Man Railway's first line to Peel took its name.

It is a landmark on the Isle of Man TT road-race course, situated in the countryside close to the outskirts of Douglas town where motorcycles slow to negotiate a left-right 'S' bend over the river. A traditional viewing spot with seating, in common with other vantage points around the local Douglas area, it is within walking distance of the Ferry Terminal where sea ferries from England, Scotland and Ireland traditionally disembarked day-trip or longer-stay passengers.

== Bridge and TT races ==
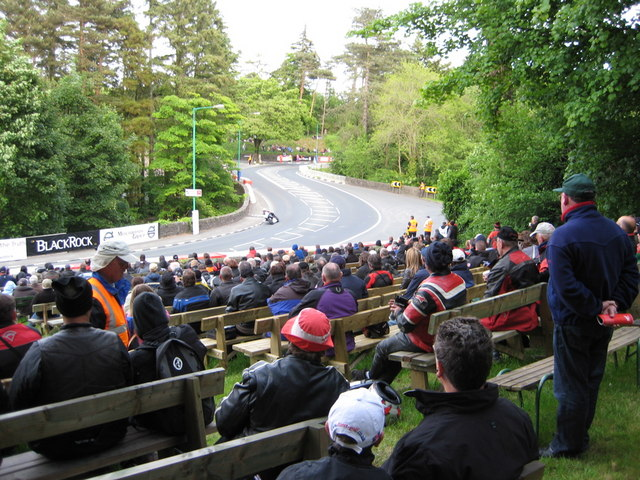
Historical seated area in church grounds, with a TT rider approaching from the first part of the 'S' bend in the distance

The bridge is on the boundary between the parishes of Braddan and Onchan. It is situated between the 1st and 2nd Milestone road-side markers on the Snaefell Mountain Course used for the Isle of Man TT and Manx Grand Prix races, on the junction of the primary A1 Douglas to Peel road and the A23. The stretch of former railway line from the Braddan Bridge halt to Quarterbridge forms part of an access road which allows motor traffic to pass between the inside and outside of the race course when the main road is closed for the races.

== Railway halt ==
Braddan Bridge Halt Stadd Droghad Vraddan
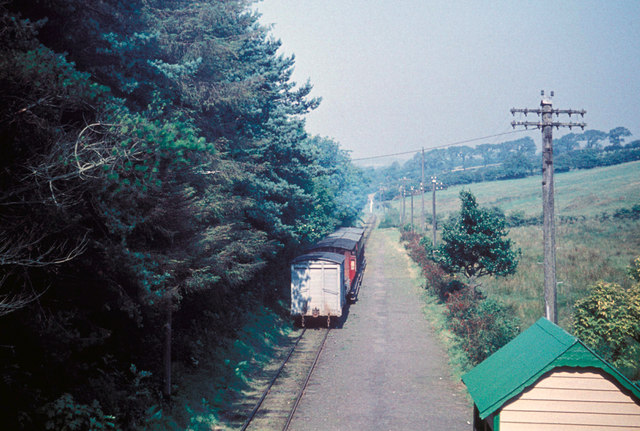
- Looking North from Braddan showing a train for Ramsey or Peel leaving, in 1961

General information
- Location: Peel Road, Braddan
- System: The Isle of Man Railway Co., Ltd.
- Owner: Isle of Man Railway Co.
- Line: Peel Line
- Platforms: One, ground level
- Tracks: One running

Construction
- Structure type: Booking hall

History
- Opened: 1881
- Closed: 1965 (seasonal until 1968)

Passengers
- Passenger only

Services
Waiting shelter
Location

=== Usage ===
Braddan Halt saw infrequent use, mostly in connection with the open air church services that took place at the nearby Kirk Braddan for many years, for which special train services were operated.

=== Royalty ===
In 1963 the Queen Mother travelled from Douglas to here to attend one of the church services in the Royal Coach F.36 which is now in preservation in the Port Erin railway museum at the line's southern terminus.

=== Re-use ===
Long after the railway had closed (the last trains ran in September 1968), the station's booking office and waiting shelter remained extant. However, in 1991 the building was removed, refurbished and now resides at the operational station of Colby on the south line.

=== Today ===
Upon removal the original shelter was replaced by a modern version in 1989, which itself has since been removed. There is now no evidence that the railway passed through here except for a section of rail used as fence posted on the Western side of the bridge.

=== Route ===
Preceding station	Isle of Man Railway	Following station
Union Mills towards; Peel	Peel Line	Quarter Bridge towards; Douglas

== See also ==
- Isle of Man Railway stations
