= Waterfall railway station (Isle of Man) =

Former railway station in Isle of Man

Waterfall Yn Eas
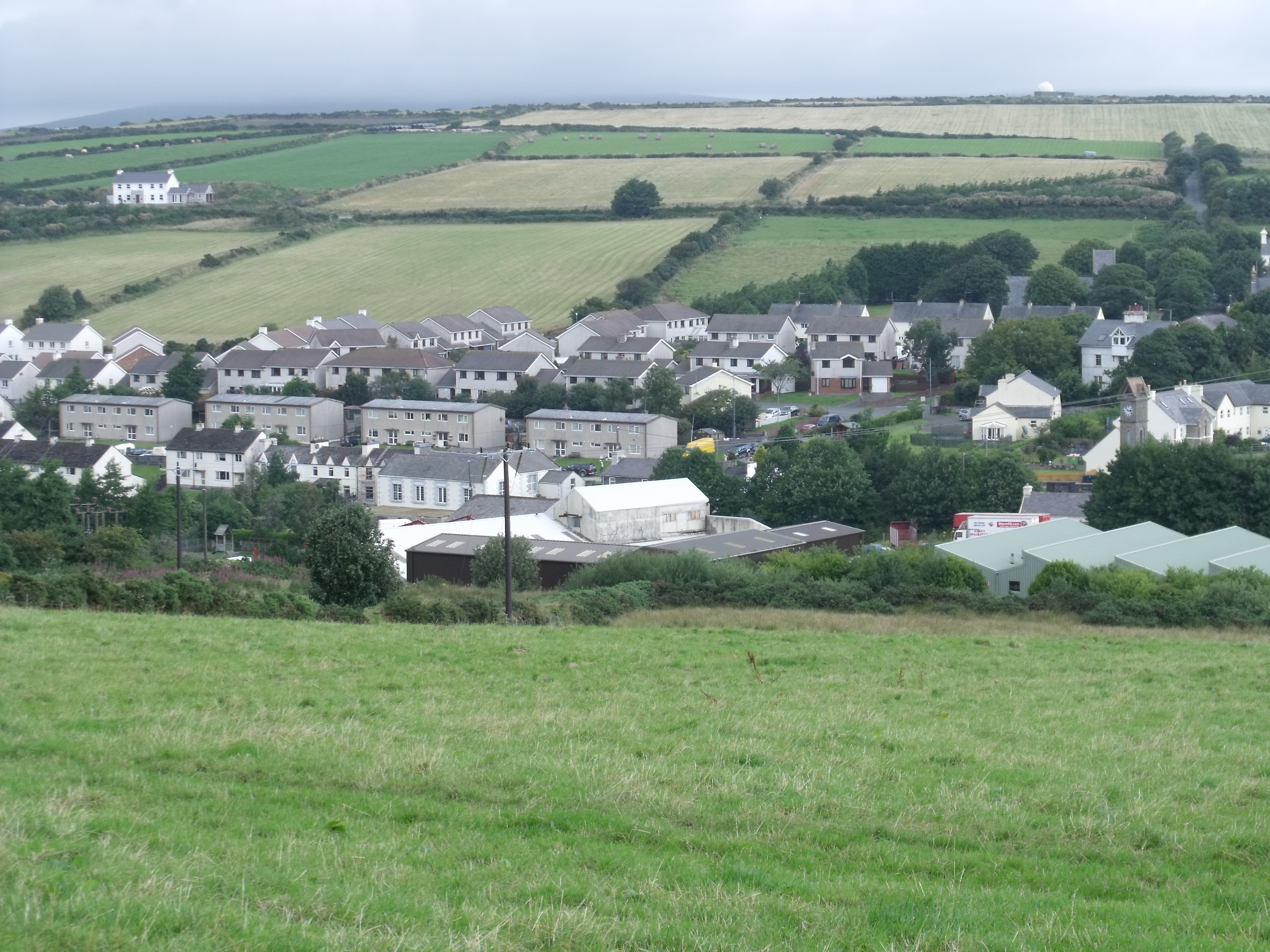

General information
- Location: Upper Foxdale
- Coordinates: 54.180°N 4.642°W
- System: The Isle of Man Railway Co., Ltd. The Manx Northern Railway Co., Ltd. The Foxdale Railway Co., Ltd.
- Owner: Isle of Man Railway Co.
- Line: Foxdale Line
- Platforms: One, Ground Level
- Tracks: One (Formerly Loop)

Construction
- Structure type: Timber Shelter
- Parking: None Provided

History
- Opened: 17 August 1886
- Closed: 16 May 1940
- Former names: Manx Northern Railway Co.

Passengers
- Passenger / Limited Freight

Services
Waiting Shelter
Location

Waterfall (Manx: Yn Eas) (sometimes referred to on timetables as "Waterfalls") was the only intermediate station on the Foxdale Railway on the Isle of Man.

== Facilities ==
The halt consisted of a simple lineside shelter, with no passing loop or passenger facilities; the line was primarily involved in the transportation of iron ore from the mining village of Foxdale and most services were of mixed trains. Indeed, the railway only ever had one coach, known as "The Foxdale Coach" which was No. 15 in the Manx Northern Railway's numbering scheme, and remains in service today as F.39 on the Isle of Man Railway from Douglas to Port Erin.

== Route ==
| Preceding station | Disused railways | Following station |
|---|---|---|
| St. John's; Terminus | Foxdale Railway | Foxdale; Terminus |

== See also ==
- Isle of Man Railway stations
- Foxdale

== Sources ==
- James I.C. Boyd Isle Of Man Railway, Volume 3, The Routes & Rolling Stock (1996) ISBN 0-85361-479-2
- Norman Jones Scenes from the Past: Isle of Man Railway (1994) ISBN 1-870119-22-3
- Robert Hendry Rails in the Isle of Man: A Colour Celebration (1993) ISBN 1-85780-009-5
- A.M Goodwyn Manx Transport Kaleidoscope, 2nd Edition (1995)
