= Knockaloe railway station and branch line =

Former railway station on the Isle of Man

Coordinates: 54.2055°N 4.7038°W

Knockaloe railway station served Knockaloe Internment Camp in the Isle of Man between 1915 and 1920.

The station was at the end of a short branch line off the Douglas to Peel line of the Isle of Man Railway (IMR). The line left the IoMR on the outskirts of Peel near Glenfaba Mills and climbed steeply in a southerly direction for about 0.7 miles (1.1 km) until it reached the village of Patrick. The line then turned west along the access road into the internment camp which had been built in the grounds of Knockaloe Farm. The total length of the branch line was about 1.2 miles (1.9 km).

The branch, and Knockaloe station at its terminus, opened on 1 September 1915 and closed on 14 October 1920. The station and line were used to transport internees, other persons, food and supplies to and from the camp.

Few photographs survive of this line, but the locomotive shed is still in existence. In addition to the loco shed, traces include the remains of concrete bridge abutments on the old course of the River Neb at the end of an embankment which crosses a section of ground called the Raggatt. The line was worked by the ex-MNR No.4/IMR No.15 0-6-0 locomotive "Caledonia". Materials used to build the line were acquired from an Irish 5' Gauge railway and were removed and shipped off the Island after the line ceased operation.

Knockaloe Farm is now government owned.

In addition to the line there was a harbour tramway built on the northern side of Peel Harbour running as far as the pier. Pictorial evidence of this is provided by a postcard illustrating 'the sale of fish at Peel'.

== See also ==
- Isle of Man Railway stations
- Knockaloe station on the Subterranea Britannica Disused Stations website
