= Peel Road railway station =

Former railway station in Isle of Man, UK

Peel Road Raad Purt ny h-Inshey
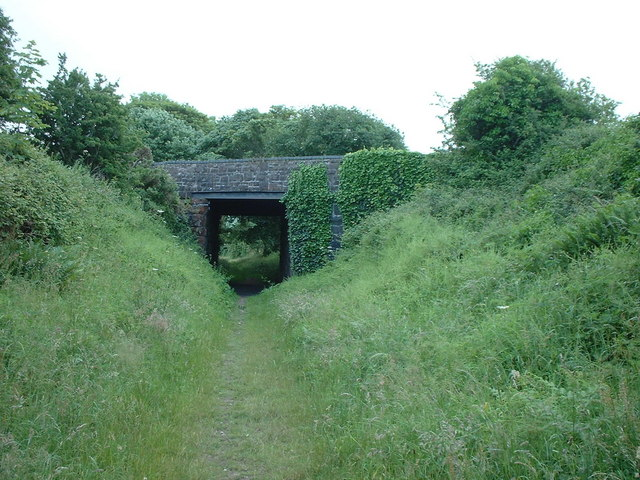

General information
- Location: Poortown Road, Glenfaba
- Coordinates: 54.215°N 4.660°W
- System: The Isle of Man Railway Co., Ltd. The Manx Northern Railway Co., Ltd.
- Owner: Isle Of Man Railway Co.
- Line: North Line
- Platforms: One, Raised
- Tracks: One, Running Line

Construction
- Structure type: Timber Building
- Parking: None Provided

History
- Opened: 1 June 1883
- Closed: 30 June 1951
- Former names: Poortown

Passengers
- By Request

Services
Office / Store / Shelter
Location

Peel Road Railway Station (Manx: Stashoon Raad Yiarn Raad Purt ny h-Inshey) was a station on the Manx Northern Railway, later owned and operated by the Isle of Man Railway. It served the area known as Poortown in the Isle of Man and was an intermediate stopping place on a line that ran between St. John's and Ramsey.

== Poortown / Peel Road ==
The station opened as Poortown in June 1883 and served the hamlet of the same name on the outskirts of the westerly hamlet of Peel. It was the closest station on the Manx Northern Railway to the hamlet and prior to its establishment the company considered either a spur or terminus station there, ultimately selecting a route to St. John's which connected with the Peel Line of the Isle of Man Railway Company. The station was renamed Peel Road in 1885 to reflect the fact that it was the railway's station closest to Peel, although it is also thought that the original title was derisory to the local inhabitants and the railway had received a number of requests to re-title the station.

== Facilities ==
=== Status ===
The station was a request stop and appeared erratically on the company's timetable literature throughout its early years. The station was officially closed in June 1951 and removed from all timetable literature after this point. Trains did however still stop at the station upon request. Despite remaining open until this time, it became an unstaffed halt as early as 1937. It was still in evidence during the final season of operation in 1968 but its remote location in comparison to the locale from which it took its name ensured that it was very little used in later years.

=== Buildings ===
The facilities here consisted of a simple wooden station building with corrugated iron roof which sat next to short raised platform, this consisted of a waiting room ladies facilities, staff accommodation, parcels room and small canopy. This was later accompanied by a grounded brake van body which was used as a permanent way store which was based on a plinth beside the nearby road bridge at the northern extent of the site.

=== Quarry Spur ===
At one time there was a sharply curving siding off the running line which facilitated the collection of stone from the nearby quarry, but the opening and closure dates are unknown. A smaller gauge tramway ran between the line and quarry, arriving beside a tall stone wall at the station's northern end beyond the bridge, where tipper trucks deposited stone into wagons.

== Today ==
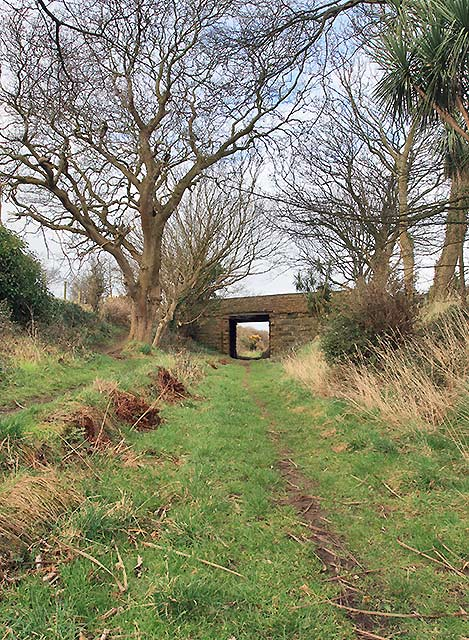
2009

Other than the vague outline of the old platform in the undergrowth and the bridge that carries the Poortown Road over the railway line at its northern end, there is little to remind us of the station here today. The buildings which were derelict when the railway closed in 1968 were demolished in 1975 at the same time as the rails were lifted. It forms part of a public footpath and may still be accessed by a sloping driveway above.

In 2023 the Isle of Man Steam Railway Supporters' Association erected a replica running in board (station sign) at the platform side as part of an ongoing project to mark former railway sites; prior to this some clearance works had also been carried out on the site to expose the brick platform edging.

== Route ==
Preceding station	Disused railways	Following station
St. John's towards Douglas	Manx Northern Railway later Isle of Man Railway	St. Germain's towards Ramsey

== See also ==
- Isle of Man Railway stations

== Sources ==
- [Isle of Man Steam Railway Supporters' Association]
