= Foxdale railway station =

Former railway station in Isle of Man

Foxdale Forsdal
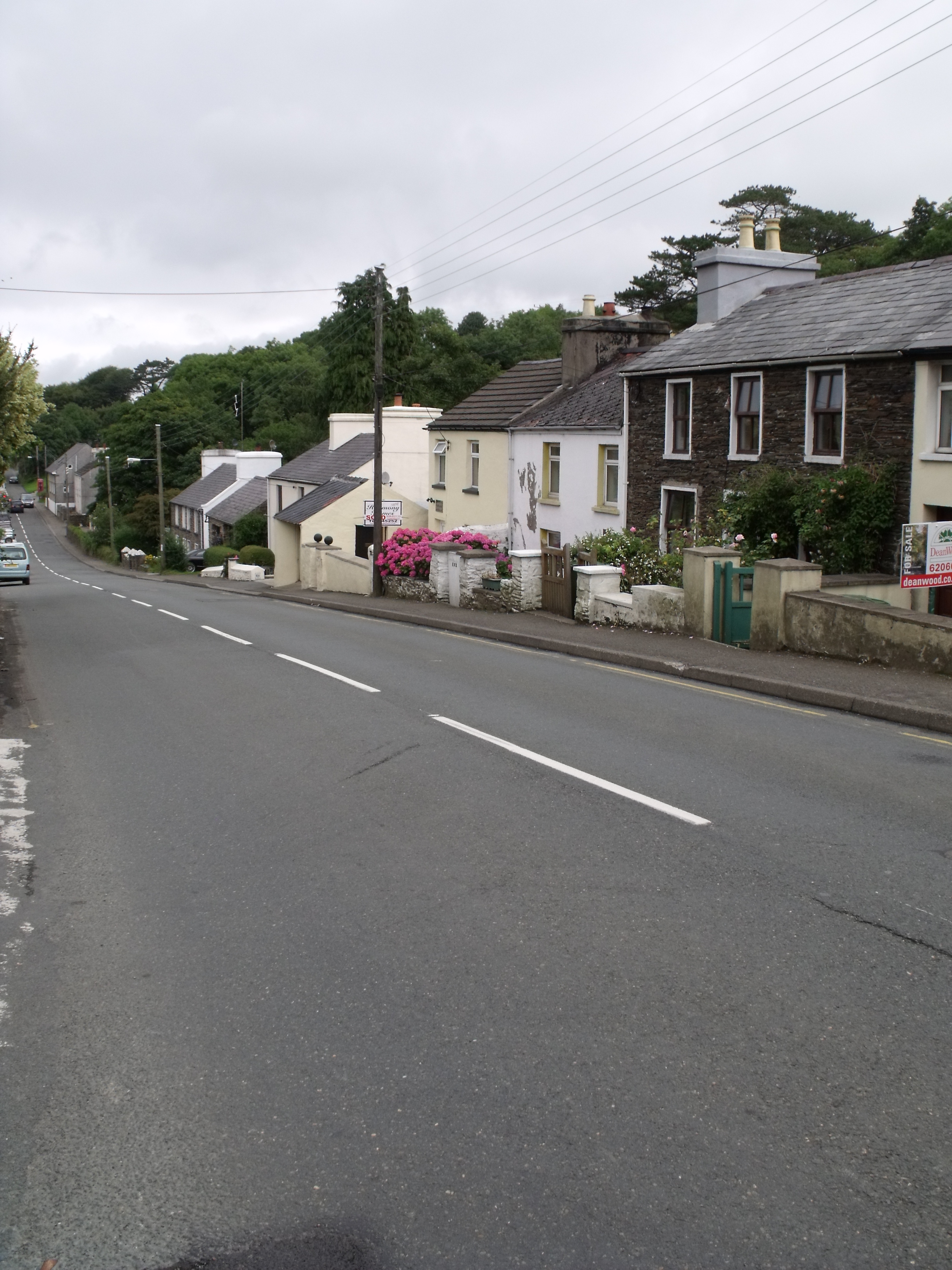

General information
- Location: Upper Foxdale, Isle of Man
- Coordinates: 54.170°N 4.636°W
- System: The Isle of Man Railway Co., Ltd. The Manx Northern Railway Co., Ltd. The Foxdale Railway Co., Ltd.
- Owner: Isle Of Man Railway Co.
- Line: Foxdale Line
- Platforms: One, Raising
- Tracks: Various, See Text

Construction
- Structure type: Station Building
- Parking: None Provided

History
- Opened: 17 August 1886
- Closed: 16 May 1940
- Former names: Manx Northern Railway Co.

Passengers
- Lead Ore / Passenger / Livestock

Services
Waiting Room / Booking Hall / Toilets
Location

Foxdale Station (Manx: Stashoon Forsdal) was the southern terminus of the Foxdale Railway in Foxdale in the Isle of Man.

== History ==
The station was established by the railway as its southern extent, built primarily to serve the lead ore industry which at the time of the line's arrival had thrived for many years but was in decline; the railway never met the expectations of its backers which were largely formed from the directorships of the Manx Northern Railway. A limited passenger service was provided from 1886 for which a solitary carriage was provided. This became known as Kitto's Coach (being named after the mines' captain who had insisted upon its provision) and later simply the Foxdale Coach. This item of stock survives today and was restored to 1887 condition in 2013 by the railway. The station featured the only diamond-type "scissor" crossing on the Island's railway network, which is believed still to be in situ today, buried beneath the mines' spoils to the rear of the station building. The mining industry collapsed in the village and the line was closed in 1940 although the rails remained in place for many years and it is believed that stock workings to this station took place as late as 1960. Today the station building survives and is used as a heritage centre, having previously seen use as a community centre and, prior to this, as the headquarters of the Manx Flux & Mica Co., for several years after the railway had closed.

== Route ==
Preceding station	Disused railways	Following station
Waterfall Halt towards St. John's	Foxdale Railway	Terminus

== See also ==
- Isle of Man Railway stations
- Foxdale
- Foxdale Mines
