= St John's railway station =

Former railway station in Isle of Man

St John's Balley Keeill Eoin
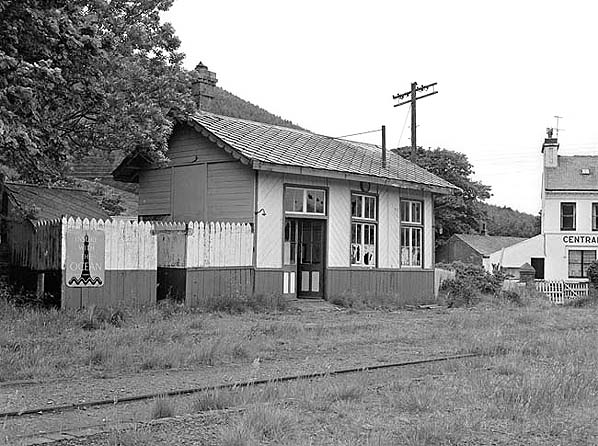

General information
- Location: Station Road, St John's, Isle of Man, IM4 3KR.
- Coordinates: 54°12′04″N 4°38′29″W
- System: The Isle of Man Railway Co., Ltd.; The Manx Northern Railway Co., Ltd.; The Foxdale Railway Co., Ltd.
- Owner: Isle Of Man Railway Co. Manx Northern Railway Co. Foxdale Railway Co.
- Lines: Douglas - Peel; Ramsey - St John's; St John's - Foxdale
- Platforms: Two, Island; Various, Goods
- Tracks: Four Running Lines; Various Sidings

Construction
- Structure type: Various, See Text
- Parking: Roadside

History
- Opened: 1 July 1873
- Closed: 9 September 1968
- Rebuilt: 1878 / 1904

Passengers
- Passengers, livestock, freight, Goods

Services
Toilets, waiting room, booking facilities
Location

St John's Railway Station (Manx: Stashoon Raad Yiarn Valley Keeill Eoin) was on the Isle of Man Railway (IMR), later merging with the nearby station of the Manx Northern Railway (MNR); it was the junction of lines to Douglas, Peel, Ramsey and Foxdale. It was close to Tynwald Hill. The station began life in 1873 as the penultimate stop on the Peel Line, the island's first passenger railway line; it consisted of a simple wooden waiting shelter with accommodation for the station master, and a passing loop. This layout remained until the arrival of the new line from the north in 1879 when a second station was established, later merging with the existing one. The station was the hub of the island's railway network, where the lines to Douglas, Peel, Ramsey and Foxdale met.

== Routes ==
Preceding station	Disused railways	Following station
Peel; Terminus	Isle of Man Railway	Ballacraine Halt towards Douglas
Terminus	Manx Northern Railway	Peel Road towards Ramsey
Terminus	Foxdale Railway	Waterfall Halt towards Foxdale

== Three Stations ==
There were three stations within the area (see below) but only the original 1873 station serving the Peel line remained in use until the closure of this part of the network, with the Foxdale line station remaining in a derelict condition until the closure of the network. The station gained the nickname "The Manx Crewe" owing to the amount of traffic.

=== Douglas - St John's - Peel ===
The original station had a simple building, north of the running line, to the same design as Crosby, a passing loop, goods siding and water tower. The MNR main line ran parallel to the Peel line for some distance west of the station before turning northwest.

=== St John's - Ramsey ===
The MNR line between Ramsey and St John's opened on 23 September 1879 and was operated by the IMR for its first eleven months. With the creation of a connection between the two railways, the 1873 station building was relocated south of the running lines,. A loop was installed on the site, and a small signal box - usually referred to as 'The Point Box' - containing a ten-lever Stevens and Co. frame was erected at the east end of the station to control the operating junction between the MNR and IMR. However, with the end of the working agreement with the IMR, the MNR established a simple station to the west of the level crossing at the Peel end of the IMR station. This was replaced in 1884 with a new station on the alignment of the Foxdale Railway, which was then under construction. For the next 15 years, MNR trains terminated at the "new" station, and only through carriages and goods traffic used the link between the IMR and MNR stations. However, the advent of the coastal electric railway from Douglas to Ramsey in 1899 caused the MNR to seek better through connections with the IMR. A new platform was constructed on the site of the original MNR station, with trains calling there for local traffic as well as at the IMR station on their way to/from Douglas. The site of this early station was cleared and eventually became the turntable road (see below). The IMR station expanded further in 1905 with the erection of a carriage shed.

=== St John's - Foxdale ===
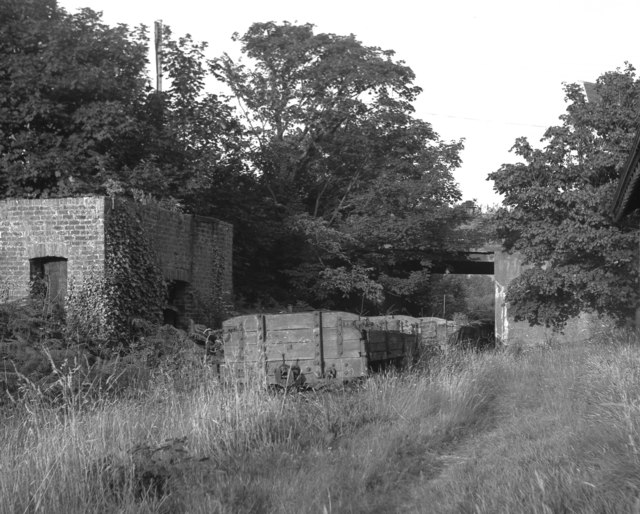
The abandoned Foxdale Line station west of the main site with a solitary "M" series wagon long after its closure; the building remains today and has been a private residence for many years.

In 1886 the Foxdale Railway arrived and operated its trains to/from the MNR's 1884 "New" station which was a short distance north of IMR station on the west side of the road. On paper at least, some MNR trains ran through from Ramsey to Foxdale, but this arrangement may have ceased quite early on, and the service between St John's and Foxdale was usually handled by the Foxdale Coach (MNR 17; later MNR 15, and eventually F39) with a second carriage being added on busy days. It also catered for Ramsey-Douglas through services: through carriages between Ramsey and Douglas were detached from the MNR train and transferred between the two stations. From the 1884 station, the Foxdale line looped around the back (north side) of the IMR station and crossed the Peel line. The bridge that carried the Foxdale Railway over the IMR remains in place at the eastern end of the site.

=== Amalgamation ===
The MNR station lost most of its passenger traffic after the Isle of Man Railway took over operation of the other two lines in 1905; it was used only for Foxdale services until 1927, after which all Foxdale services passed through and then reversed into the IMR station. These services were never very profitable and ended during 1943. The station building was converted into a house for the St John's stationmaster in 1906. The former Foxdale Railway station closed completely in 1960 at the same time as the Foxdale line. Latterly, disused rolling stock was stored in the station. The station building survives as a private dwelling.

== Operation ==
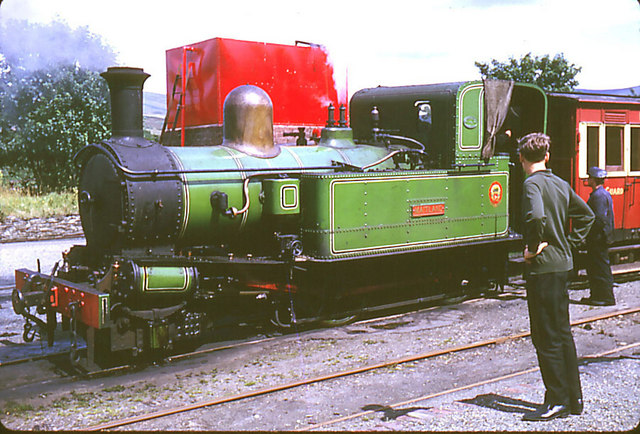
Carrying the then-new spring green livery, No.11 Maitland at the station in 1967, the penultimate operational season.

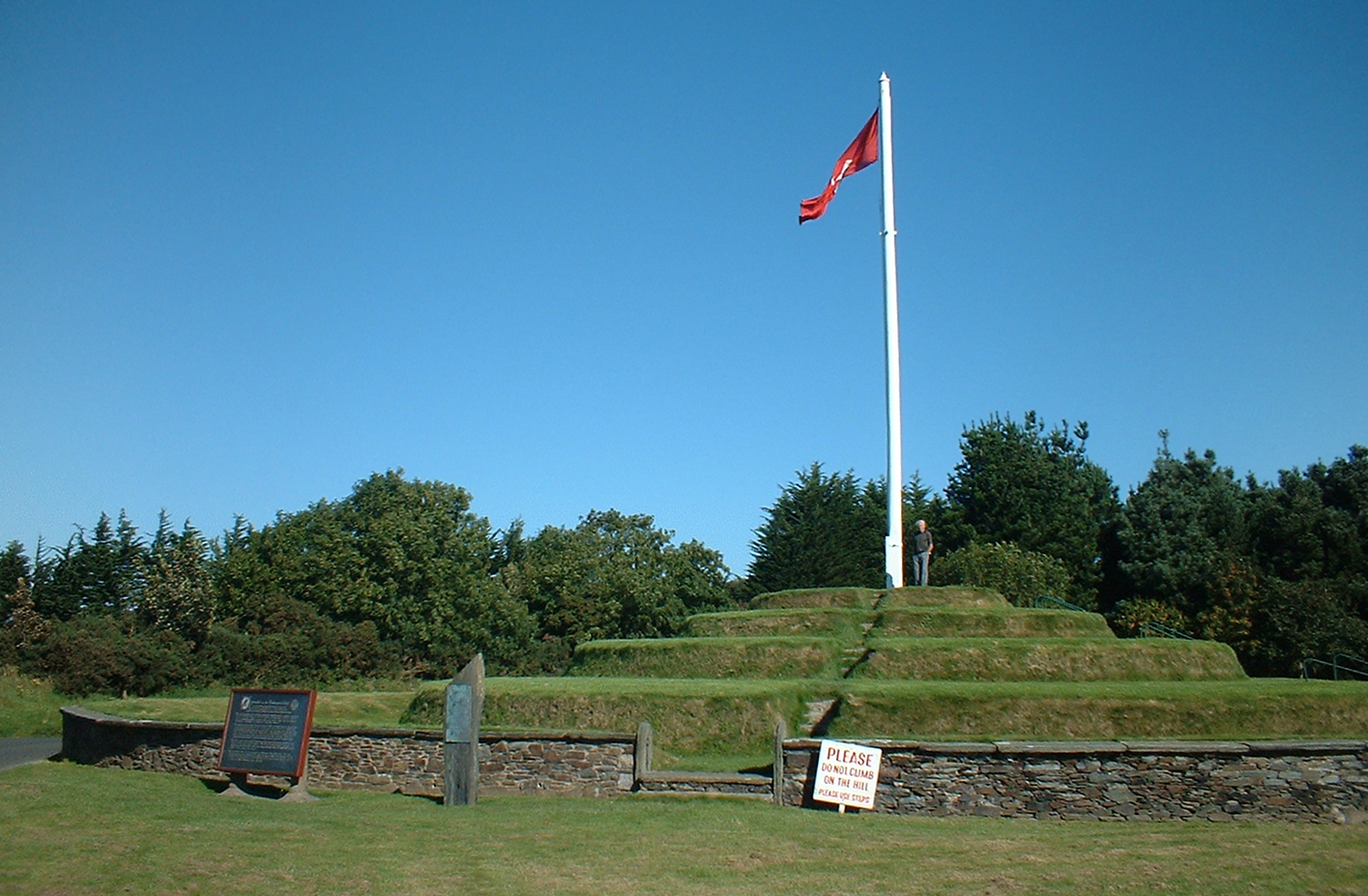
Tynwald Hill, site of the annual open-air parliament each July which was served by the railway and saw its busiest times.

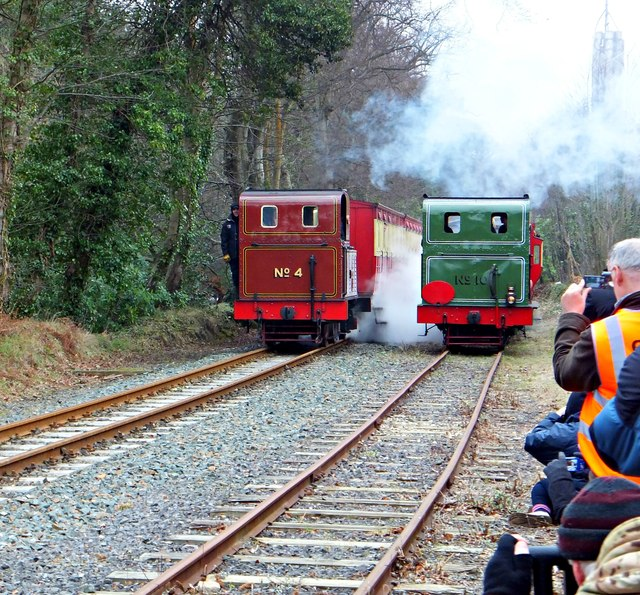
Modern recreation of trains running parallel outside Douglas Station with No.10 G.H. Wood and No.4 Loch

=== Peak ===
The station often had busy periods, and was the hub of the railway network serving trains from three lines, although workshop and maintenance facilities were at Douglas Station and only storage was provided here in the form of a large carriage shed at goods yard. Services from Douglas to Ramsey and Peel often arrived as a single train, which was divided at the eastern end of the station prior to entering the station for passengers to board and alight. Two locomotives would often double head this far, the first (or "pilot" locomotive) drawing forward into the platform whilst the second drew its portion forward onto the relevant platform, and the pilot then ran back to collect its carriages. Douglas services from Peel and Ramsey were often scheduled to join at the station. Thus all three platform faces could be occupied at the same time. Prior to 1940 trains also served Foxdale, but a separate station served this line. The station was known as "the Crewe Junction of the Isle of Man" owing to these intensive periods.

=== Tynwald Day ===
The busiest day was Tynwald Day, when it was common to see the majority of the railway's rolling stock in service bringing passengers to the outdoor parliament ceremony, which took place a short walk from the station. For this occasion the railway operated a special unique timetable: trains often ran from dawn until well after midnight to cope with demand, and train movements were frequent throughout the day. It was common for all carriages to be in use and not unheard of for passengers to travel in open cattle vans and wagons and withdrawn carriages. This tradition lasted until the final 1968 season when an intensive service was still maintained. Since closure the station site has been used for car parking for the ceremony.

=== Market Days ===
The village was home to cattle mart and these days often saw long trains early in the day moving livestock to the adjacent mart, for which a large goods yard was provided with storage, loading platform and cattle dock. Latterly these sidings were used to stow spare rolling stock, the Foxdale Coach and two Empress Vans being regularly stored here.

=== The "Race" ===
For many years trains heading to both Peel and Ramsey were scheduled to depart within minutes of each other, the main lines running parallel for some distance to the west of the level crossing; despite the official timings, it was often the case that one would be held back slightly so that the two could unofficially "race" out of the station to their respective destinations. Inevitably, it was the westbound train to Peel which "won" the race, the track being on a downward gradient all the way to the western terminus. This is often statically recreated during modern events on a spur known as "Peel East" just west of Douglas Station during the annual Manx Heritage Transport Festival.

== Features ==
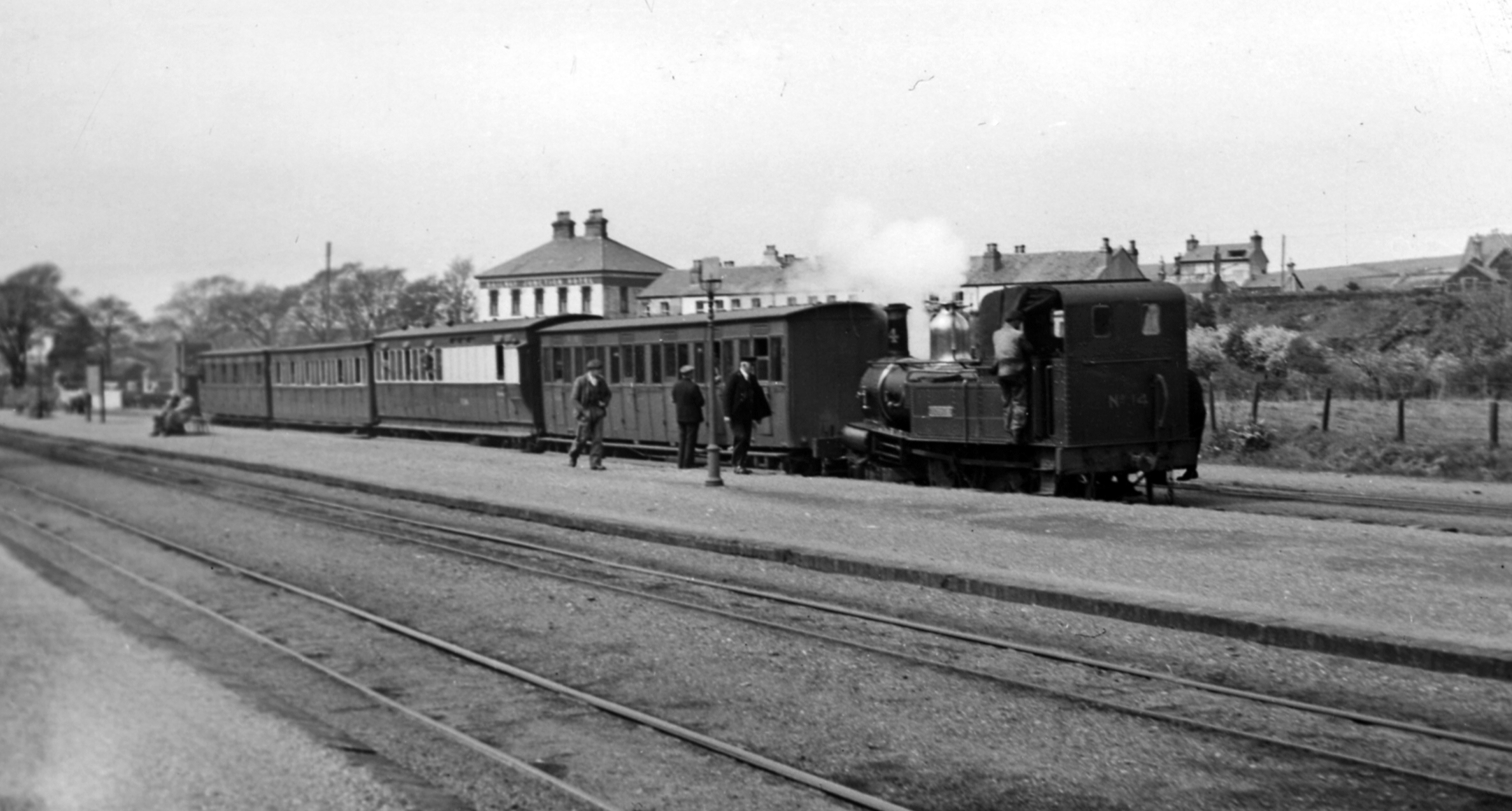
A train from Ramsey at the station in 1951 hauled by No.14 Thornhill showing the long island platform which served both lines to good effect.

At one time there was a footbridge, but photographs show passengers still crossing the running lines (the platforms were very shallow) and by 1944 the bridge had been removed. From March 1925, the station was the site of the sole turntable on the network. It was purchased from the West Clare Railway in Ireland, after that company had been unable to accept delivery from the manufacturers Ransomes & Rapier Ltd of Ipswich. It was used to turn carriages to equalise weathering and wheel wear and tear. Use for turning of locomotives was not documented, and they usually ran "bunker first" towards Douglas. In the earliest years of the railway locomotives were turned to be chimney first towards Douglas if outstationed at Peel, Port Erin or Ramsey, but this practice was abandoned in the early years of the twentieth century. The turntable was removed in 1961 and stored at Douglas with the intention of using it to turn the recently acquired diesel railcars. This scheme never came to fruition and the turntable was moved to Ballasalla Station in 1974 and scrapped shortly thereafter. When the Marquess of Ailsa took over the line in 1967 a display of disused locomotives was created at the station. After services ceased in 1968 the carriage shed was used to store surplus rolling stock which was moved back to Douglas for use on the south line as required. In 1975 there were two disastrous fires in the shed, and much historic stock was lost. After this the site was used for storing rails as the track was dismantled, and cleared by the late 1970s to become a car park. There was a gravel siding at one time at the eastern end of the station beyond the Foxdale line overbridge, which used temporary Jubilee rail and operated on 2' 0" gauge independently of the railway, although a siding to access this was installed.

== George Albert Crellin ==
Born 2 November 1897, for many years the station master was George Albert Crellin, a well-known figure on the railway who latterly bought and lived with his wife Olga Evelyn Crellin (née Leece), in the original station house for the Foxdale line, which ceased to be used after the amalgamation. He features on many later photographs of the station and was a helpful figure who used to travel to the small signal cabin, or more accurately, point box, on his bicycle. He was the last station master, retiring in the final year, 1968. In retirement he still had an active involvement with the railway until his death on 24 February 1974.

== Later ==
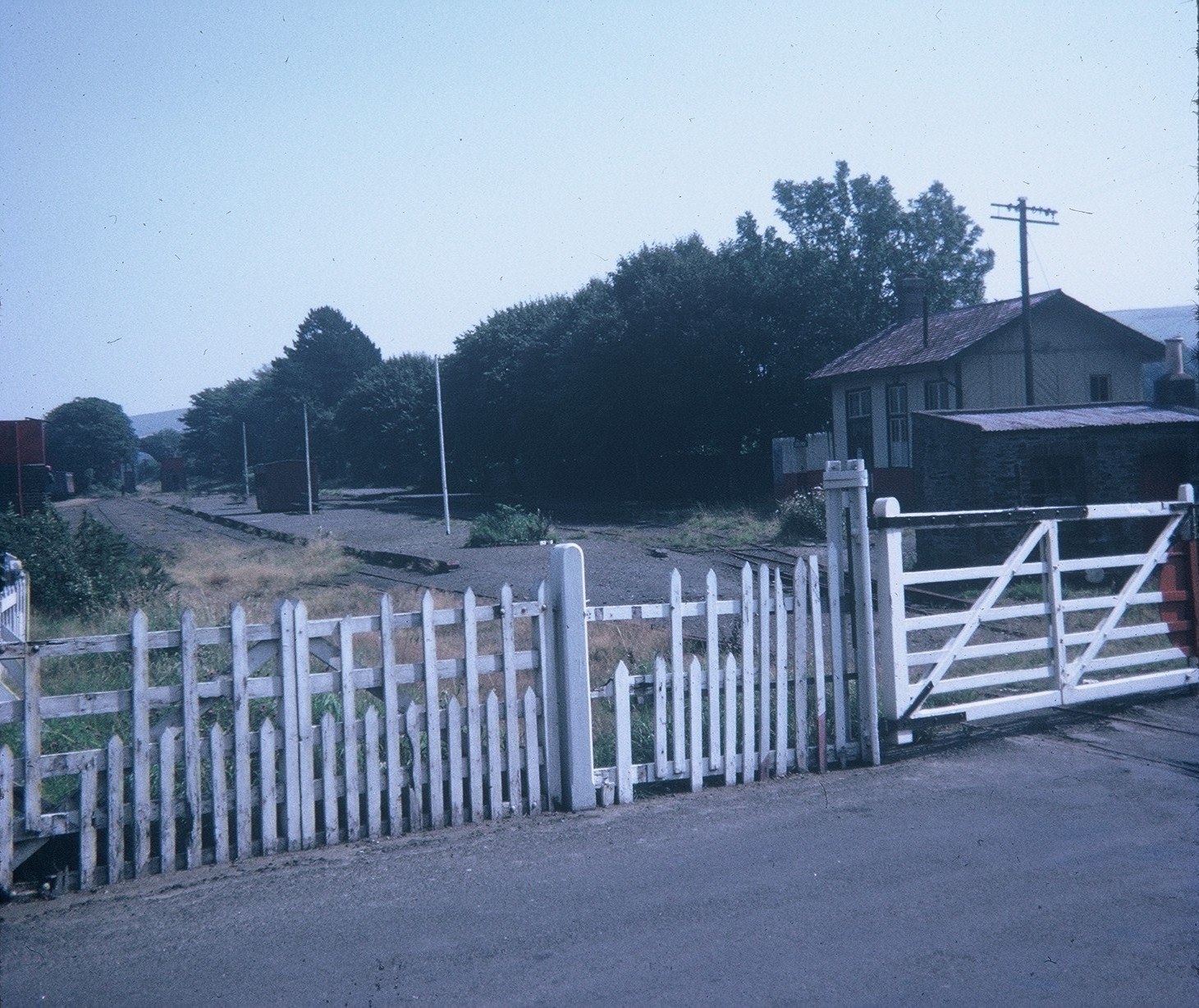
The station after closure remained in situ until the site was cleared in 1975

Several stock trains passed through the station after closure in 1968, largely marshalling rolling stock. The last recorded movement on the site was in 1971 when rolling stock was moved for winter storage in the carriage shed; thereafter there was a fire on 10 December 1975 which saw a significant number of carriages destroyed. A later controlled fire in June the following year disposed of any remains, not before some carriages were sold and moved off the site. All rails were lifted and the site cleared, becoming a car parking area since this time. The 1873 timber structure and stone-built points box were also removed at this time, with only some rails remaining in the bisecting road which survived for many years. Only the Foxdale Line overbridge remains today, and remnants of a former advertisement hoarding at the eastern end of the station; the Foxdale Line station remains on the other side of the road as a private dwelling - in his retirement this had been the residence of Mr. George Crellin and remains in his family today. A new primary school has been built on the site, opened by Queen Elizabeth II in 2003, but the site remains accessible for a train should the services be reintroduced. The station would have to be downsized and/or relocated.

== See also ==
- Isle of Man Railway stations
- St John's, Isle of Man
