= Ramsey Quayside Railway =

Coordinates: 54.3217°N 4.3795°W

The Ramsey Quayside Railway was an extension off the ex-Manx Northern Railway from the station at Ramsey and ran along the quayside to the market square.
