= St John's, Isle of Man =

Coordinates: 54.202°N 4.641°W

St John's: Manx: Balley Keeill Eoin
- Location within the Isle of Man
- OS grid reference: SC277818
- Parish: German
- Sheading: Glenfaba
- Crown dependency: Isle of Man
- Post town: ISLE OF MAN
- Postcode district: IM4
- Dialling code: 01624
- Police: Isle of Man
- Fire: Isle of Man
- Ambulance: Isle of Man
- House of Keys: Glenfaba & Peel

St John's (Manx: Balley Keeill Eoin) is a small village in the sheading of Glenfaba in the Isle of Man, in the Island's central valley. It is in the House of Keys constituency of Glenfaba & Peel, which elects two MHKs.

== Tynwald Day ==
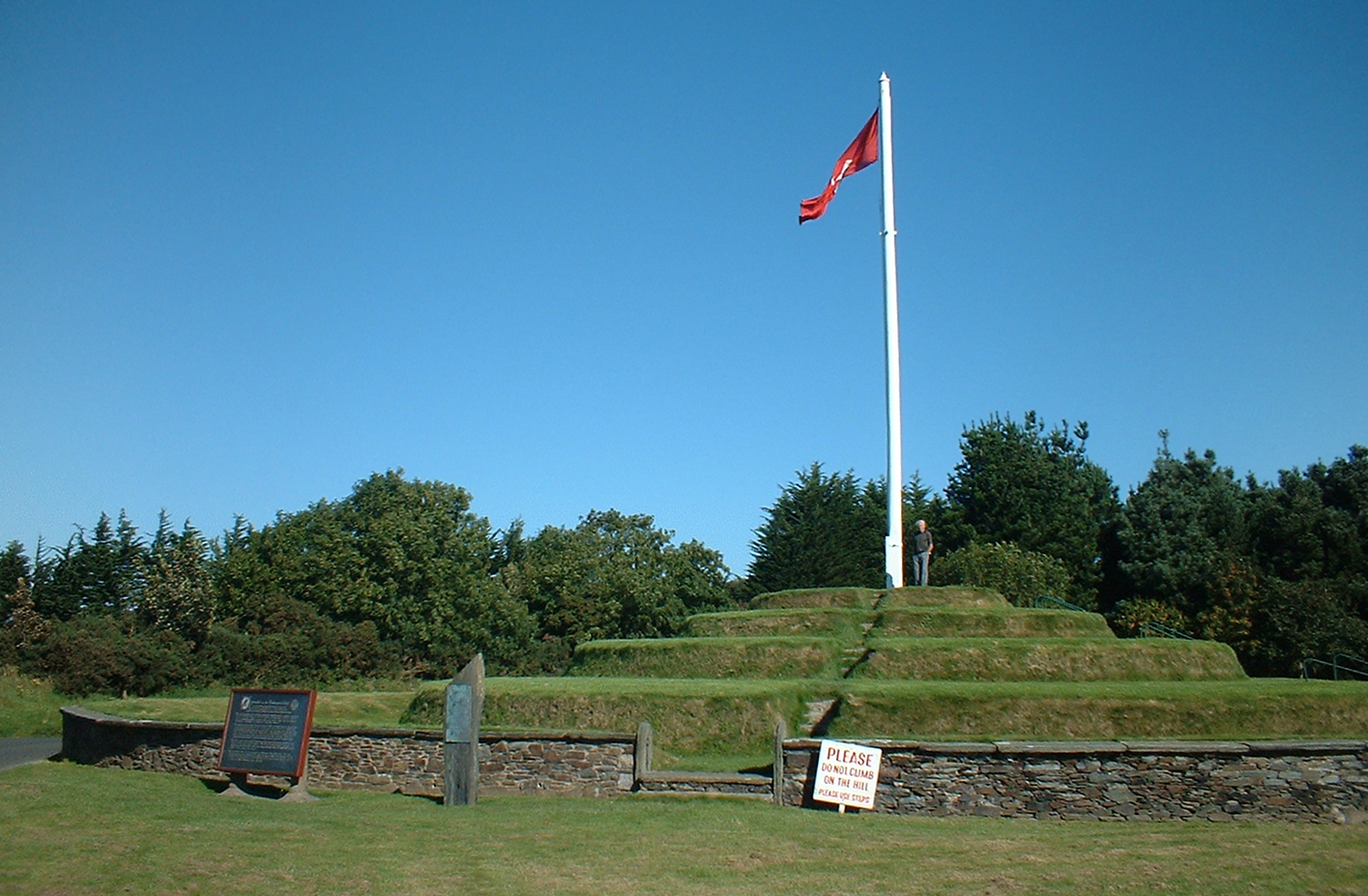
Tynwald Hill

Tynwald Hill, the original assembly place for the Isle of Man parliament, Tynwald, is the scene of the annual ceremony in which the laws of the Isle of Man are promulgated in English and Manx, usually on 5 July. Tynwald Day attracts thousands of spectators to watch the ceremony and participate in the Tynwald Fair.

Tynwald Day, 5 July, corresponded to St John's feast day by the Julian calendar, which was the date held to be midsummer day; so Tynwald Day was a midsummer fair.

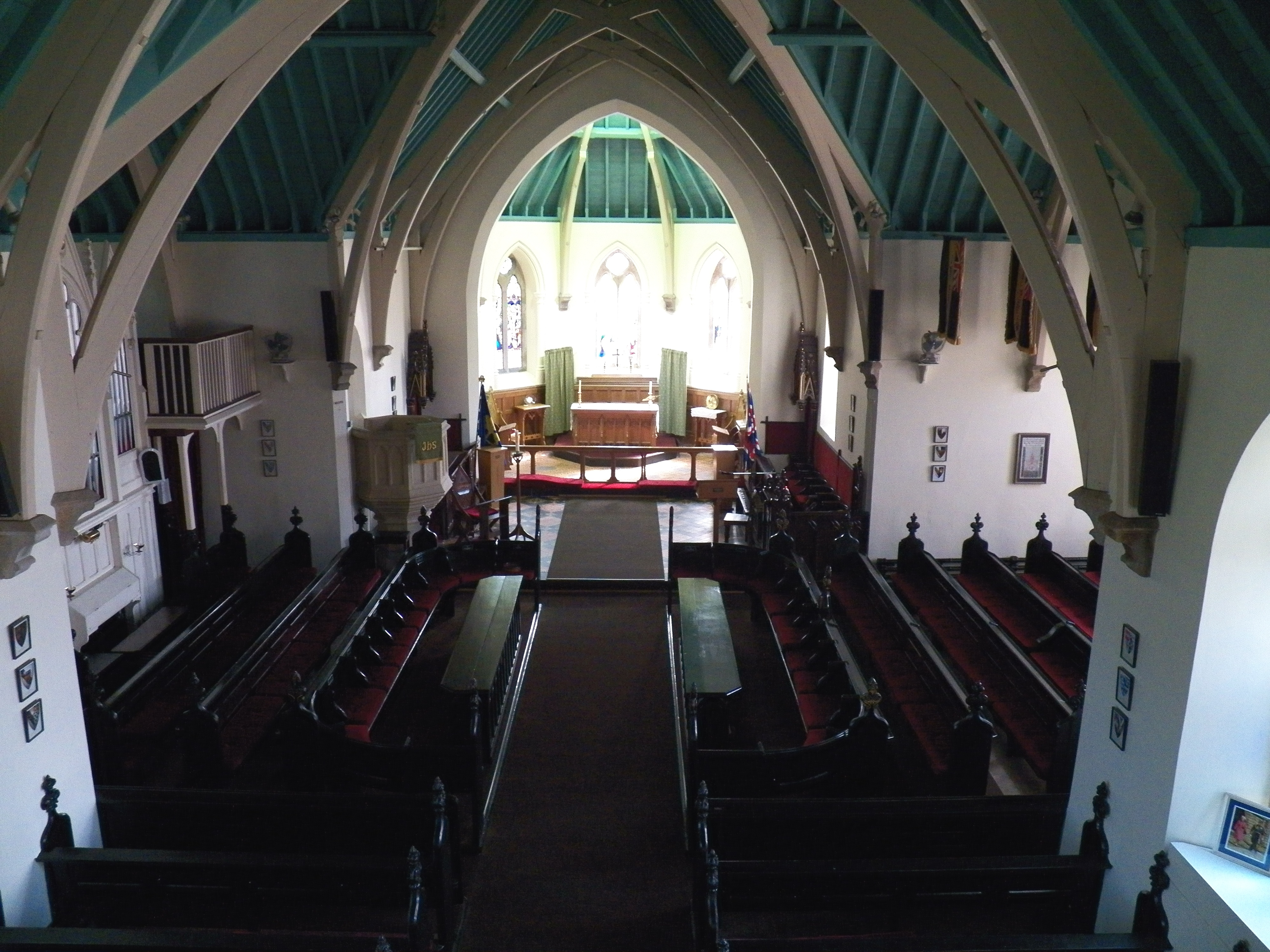
Chapel of St John (Tynwald Church)

The Anglican church in the village is dedicated to St John and the village takes its name from the church. Within the church are reserved seats with name plaques for members of both branches of the Manx parliament, whilst in the adjacent church hall is an exhibition detailing the history of Tynwald.

== Other features of the village ==
The village is dominated by Slieau Whallian, a steep hill to its south. The Tynwald National Park (also known as the Arboretum) is situated on the east side of the village.

Opposite the church is the site of the ancient pound where stray animals were placed until claimed. If unclaimed after a year and a day they became the property of the Lord of Mann, whilst the recovery fee for reclaimed animals was shared equally between the Lord of Mann and the pound official, the "pindar". Also displayed on that site are large stones from a 2300 BC burial chamber found locally.

The main commercial venture of the village is Tynwald Mills, which claims to be the only department store in the island.

== Road transport ==
The village is on the A1 Douglas to Peel road. It is also close to the junction with the A3, which leads in a southerly direction to Foxdale and Castletown, and northerly to Kirk Michael, Ballaugh, Sulby and Ramsey. It is thus conveniently located for access from all parts of the Island (even before these roads were built), which is believed to have been a consideration in the original location of Tynwald here.

== Former railway station ==
The village's railway station has long since closed. In its day it was a major railway junction, in the context of the Isle of Man: it was on the Isle of Man Railway (Peel line), the Manx Northern Railway and the Foxdale Railway. The trackbed of the Isle of Man Railway is now used as a footpath, named the Steam Heritage Trail.

== Primary school ==
Since 2003, the former St John's School building has been used by the Bunscoill Ghaelgagh (the Manx language primary school).
