= Foxdale Railway =

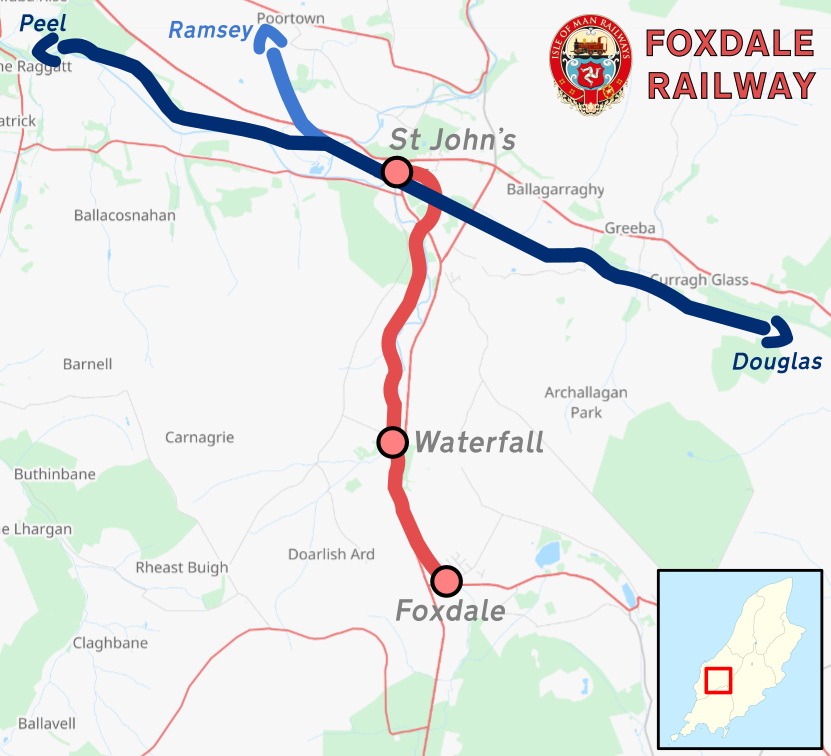
Route map

The Foxdale Railway was a 3 ft (914 mm) narrow gauge branch line which ran from St John's to Foxdale in the Isle of Man. The line was 2 1/4 miles (3.6 km) long. From an end-on junction with the Manx Northern Railway west of St John's, it then passed to the north of the Isle of Man Railway station before curving south and crossing the IMR's line from Douglas via an overbridge to the east of the station (the only place where one railway crossed another in the Isle of Man unless one counts the 19-inch (480 mm) gauge Great Laxey Mine Railway tunnel under the Manx Electric Railway). The line had a fairly constant incline of 1 in 48 through Waterfall(s) Halt, the only intermediate station, to the terminus in Upper Foxdale. The tracks extended beyond Foxdale into the mine workings area.

== Stations ==
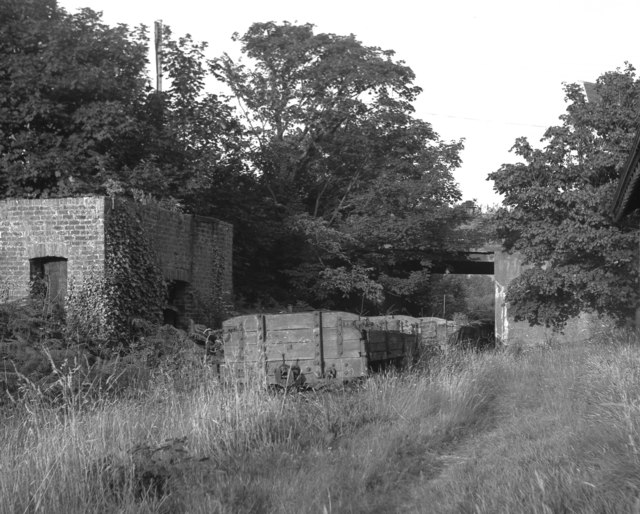
The abandoned station at St John's in 1971

Point	Coordinates (Links to map resources)	OS Grid Ref	Notes
St John's	54.2012°N 4.6415°W	SC27798160	
Waterfall	54.18°N 4.642°W	SC27677924	
Foxdale	54.17°N 4.636°W	SC28027812	

The structures at the terminus stations were identical and both survive today. The diminutive mid-way request stop, named either "Waterfall" or "Waterfalls" (with or without the "s" depending on timetable issues), had only a small shelter and was briefly fitted with a siding. The act authorising the line's construction also included provision for the line to be extended to Ballasalla or Castletown, but these plans came to nothing.

At Foxdale the line was extended beyond the station limits to serve the Foxdale Mines, notably this was used for transporting spoil for use in runway construction at RAF Andreas in 1940. The railway had a lucrative contract for providing this spoil and it proved to be the last purposeful work carried out on the Foxdale line, the spoil being taken for onward travel along the north line.

== History ==
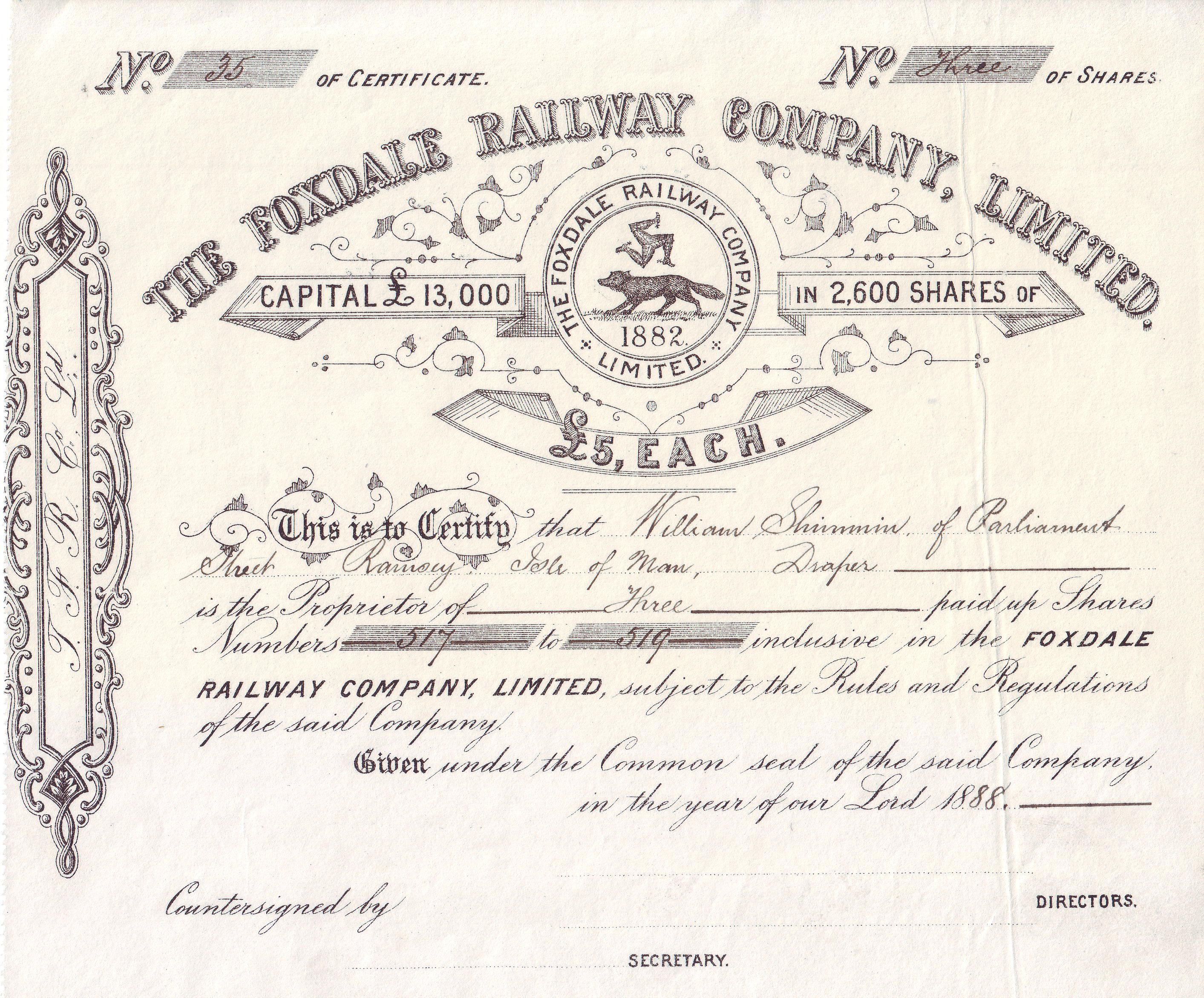
Share Certificate of the Foxdale Railway Company, 1888

Goods traffic began running in June 1886, followed by passenger services on 14 August and the line was officially opened on 16 August 1886. The company had close ties to the Manx Northern Railway, many of whose directors were also on the board of the smaller company. The line was leased from the outset by the Manx Northern Railway, which guaranteed a 5% return on capital. The railway initially used the Manx Northern Railway station at St John's, situated to the west of the Isle of Man Railway station. Later, in 1886, the Manx Northern Railway abandoned its original station at St John's and built a new platform and station building on the alignment of the Foxdale Railway more closely adjacent to the IMR station. Foxdale line trains used this facility until 1927, after which trains reversed in and out of the IMR station. Upon the opening of the railway, the Manx Northern Railway ran some services from Ramsey to Foxdale, but passenger traffic on the line was always light and these services gave way to local shuttles between St John's and Foxdale. Latterly, passenger services consisted of a loco and one coach. The coach used was specifically made for the branch and known as the Foxdale Coach. It survives today.

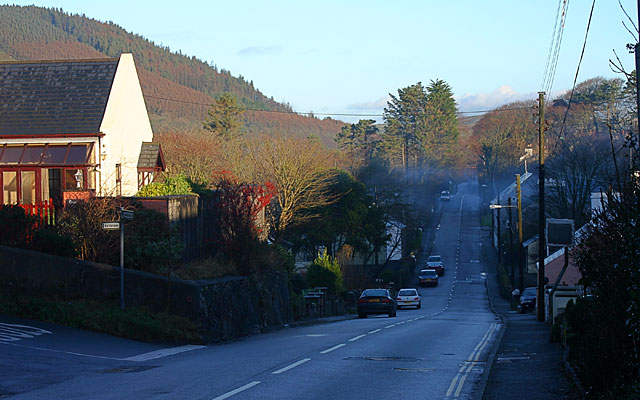
Station Road in Foxdale, the line crossed the road in the dip at the bottom to serve the mine workings beyond the passenger station

Shortly after the line had opened, the lead mining industry started to decline and in July 1891 the Foxdale company went into liquidation. Much of the Manx Northern Railway's freight revenue originating in Foxdale, with loaded wagons of lead being transported to the harbour in Ramsey and coal and mine supplies ferried back to the mines. The fortunes of the Manx Northern Railway were also closely tied to the Foxdale line due to the terms of the lease being favourable to the smaller concern. The Manx Northern Railway operated the line on behalf of the liquidators until, following an investigation by a Tynwald committee, the Isle of Man Railway took over all operations on the Manx Northern Railway, including the Foxdale line, on 26 February 1904. The Isle of Man Railway was then authorised to purchase both the Manx Northern Railway and the Foxdale line a few months later on 19 April 1905. The last lead mine in the area closed in 1911 and from then on only spoil trains and the infrequent passenger and general goods services used the line. From 3 June 1912, tickets were no longer sold at Foxdale station, the station building was converted into a private dwelling during the 1920s.

The last regular passenger train worked the branch in 1940. From then until 1943 the line remained in use for trains carrying mining spoil for use in runway construction at RAF bases in the north of the island. The line saw troop specials during World War II as well as spoil trains and the occasional passenger service, run due to bus shortages.

== Closure and remains ==
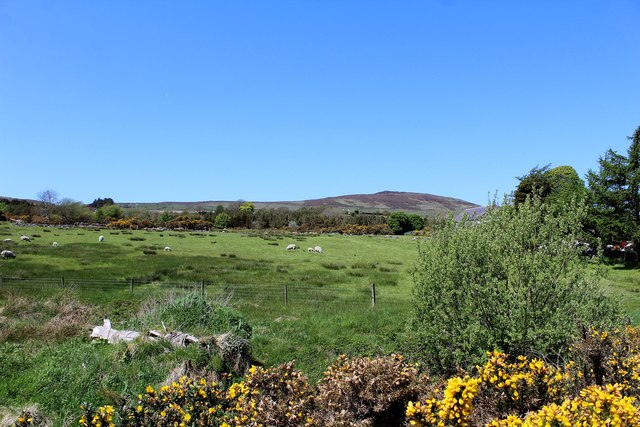
View from the former trackbed of the line which is mostly now a footpath

The last train reported to have used the branch was an engineering working in January 1960 which removed rails and other material from Foxdale to be used elsewhere on the system. The rails on the line were still in situ until at least 1972, before finally being removed during the mid-1970s and much of the route is now a footpath. The viaduct beyond St John's was removed in 1975 and a further bridge along the line later as part of road-widening scheme. The overbridge at St John's station remains in situ today, as do both terminus buildings. The station building at St John's became a private dwelling and was lived in for some time by the former station master George Crellin. The station at Foxdale was used as a youth club for local children for a number of years before becoming the home of the Foxdale Heritage Centre. It also served for a period as the headquarters of the Manx Flux Co., Ltd. The stanchions of the former viaduct remain and there are still some rails visible in the road at the outer terminus. The famous scissors crossing behind the station is still said to be in situ, although unknown to most people as it is buried underneath a bank of hardcore from the mines. Foxdale may have the distinction of being the station on the island's closed network which has the most of its original station trackwork surviving. The spoil heaps between Foxdale station and the mines lead to the area gaining the nickname "the back of the moon".

== Rolling stock ==
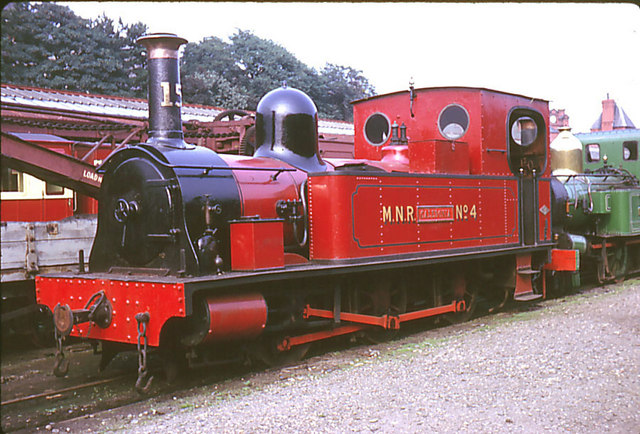
MNR No. 4 Caledonia, which was purchased to operate the line from its opening

In 1885 the Manx Northern Railway purchased a more powerful locomotive to work goods services over the branch and its steep gradients which was given the name Caledonia owing to the company chairman's Scottish ancestry. It was the only locomotive purchased for the line and remains extant and operational on the remaining south line of the railway today. Similarly, only one carriage was purchased, the unique Foxdale Coach which also remains in use on the railway today. The two are often paired to make a recreation Foxdale Line train during special events. There were initial proposals for a second locomotive to the same design as Caledonia, to have been named Atlas, in conjunction with a proposed extension south but owing to the fortunes of the line this never came to fruition. The goods stock used on the line came from the Manx Northern Railway and later, after amalgamation, the Isle of Man Railway. After the merger the familiar Beyer Peacock locomotives of the Isle of Man Railway also served the line. Photographic references show No. 1 Sutherland, No. 4 Loch, No. 5 Mona, No. 6 Peveril, No. 7 Tynwald No. 8 Fenella working on the line, leading to a theory that only the smaller locomotives were used on the branch as well as occasionally the six-wheel carriages.

== See also ==
- Isle of Man Mining Company
- Isle of Man Railway level crossings and points of interest

== Bibliography ==
- Anon. (1968). Railways in the Isle of Man. The Isle of Man Tourist Board.
- Heavyside, Tom (2004). Narrow Gauge Branch Lines Douglas to Ramsey. Middleton Press. ISBN 1-904474-39-X.
