= Peel railway station =

Former railway station in the Isle of Man

Peel Purt ny h-Inshey
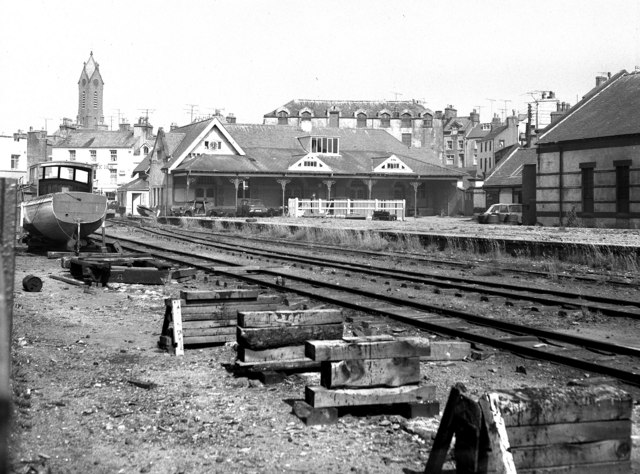
- The station after closure

General information
- Location: Station Place, Peel, Isle of Man, IM9 5LR.
- Coordinates: 54.2219°N 4.6974°W
- System: Isle of Man Railway
- Owner: Isle of Man Railway Co., Ltd.; Now Manx National Heritage
- Line: Isle of Man Railway Douglas to Peel line
- Platforms: Three, half-raised
- Tracks: Four running lines

Construction
- Structure type: Station building, goods shed, water tower

History
- Opened: 1 July 1873
- Closed: 9 September 1968
- Rebuilt: 1902

Services
Ticketing, waiting room, and toilet facilities
Location

Peel railway station (Manx: Stashoon Raad Yiarn Phurt ny h-Inshey) was a terminus on the Isle of Man Railway. It served the town of Peel in the Isle of Man and was the final stopping place on a line that ran between the city of Douglas and the town. It was part of the Island's first railway line.

== Construction ==
The station was built by the Isle of Man Railway and opened on 1 July 1873. The station was located at the end of the railway line from Douglas via St John's to the small town of Peel. The decision to locate the station by the harbour was taken late in 1872 when the Isle of Man Railway abandoned plans to extend the line to Ramsey. The station building was located next to Peel harbour. A small goods depot was situated next to the platforms, on the side farthest from the harbour.

== Services ==
Most trains from Douglas to Peel were combined with trains to Ramsey. The two sections split at St John's. The IoMR timetable for July 1922 shows twelve trains arriving at Peel from Douglas on weekdays. Nine were 'split trains', whilst three were complete trains from Douglas. The first arrival was at 8:58 am and the last was at 11:40 pm. The average time taken for the 12 miles from Douglas was 40 minutes. Regular trains ran to and from Douglas until the line was closed on 13 November 1965. Services resumed on 3 June 1967, but ceased permanently on 7 September 1968. The reopening day of the line in 1967 saw the celebrations centred on this station and nearly all the railway's serviceable rolling stock was on site together with five steam locomotives on the day, and a fair held on the station forecourt to mark the event. The last time a locomotive was on the site was in 1998 as part of the Steam 125 celebrations marking the anniversary of the line's opening when locomotive No. 1 Sutherland was operated on a short section of temporary track in the car park which was once the island platform. At various times there have been plans to create short sections of track from the station but none of these have ever come to fruition, though the Manx Transport Museum Group have their headquarters in the nearby former brickworks office, holding a number of railway-related items.

== After closure ==
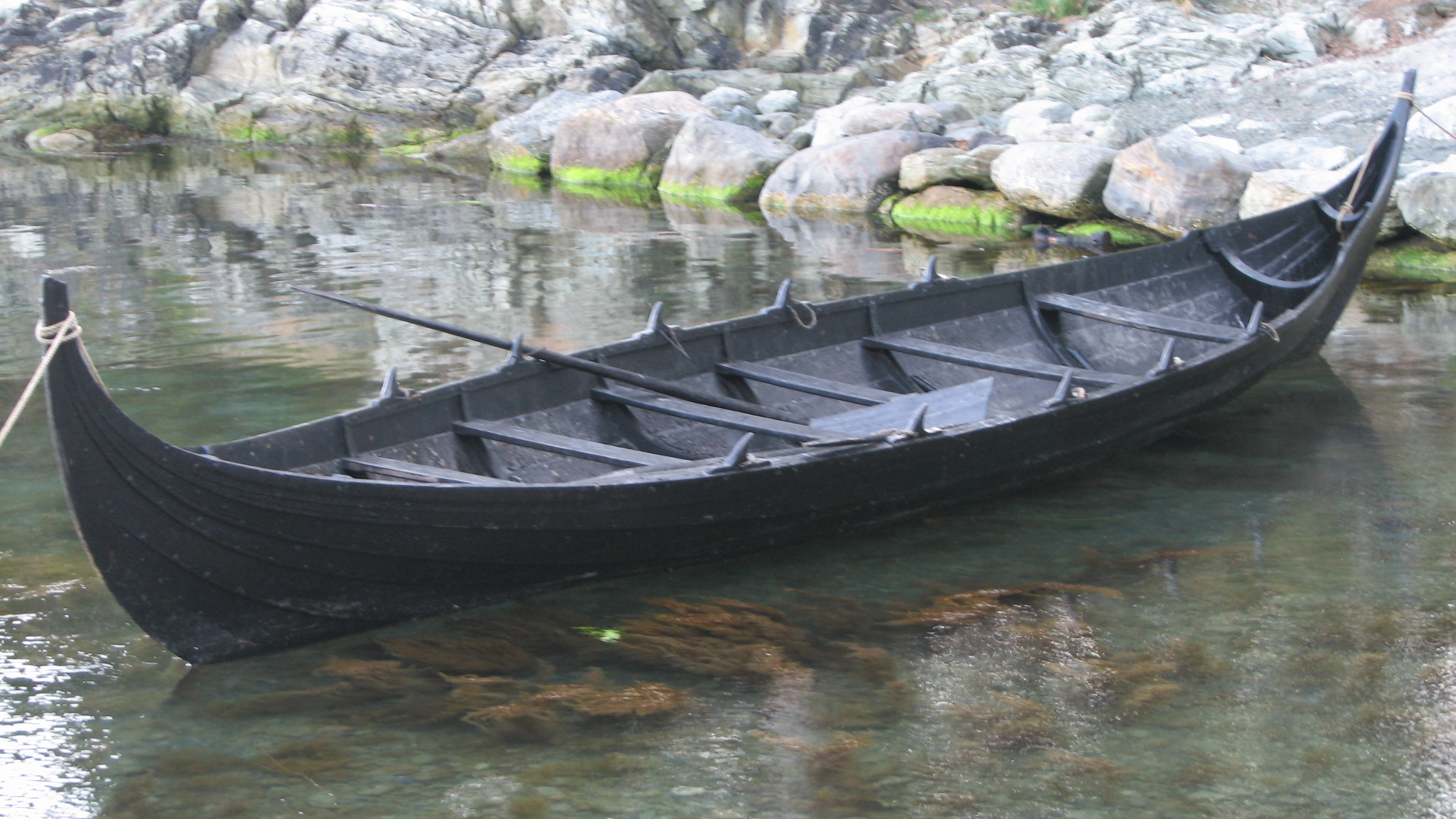
Replica of a Viking boat

After the final trains departed in 1968 the station remained in situ for a number of years. The rails were lifted in 1975, and then the site was surfaced and used as a boat park; the main station building also became a fisherman's shelter and the goods shed was converted in 1979 to house the replica Viking longboat Odin's Raven which was constructed in Norway and sailed to the Island to commemorate the millennium of the Island's parliament in that year. The locomotive shed at the eastern end of the yard was demolished at the same time as the rails were lifted, having become unsafe following a fire that engulfed the wooden lean-to some years previously, although the water tower beside it has survived and now forms part of a visitor's centre operated by the local heritage trust. This site also now houses one of the railway's original 1873 carriages, which has recently been cosmetically restored. The site remained in this format until 1998, when the award-winning visitor's centre was developed on the site.

== Today ==
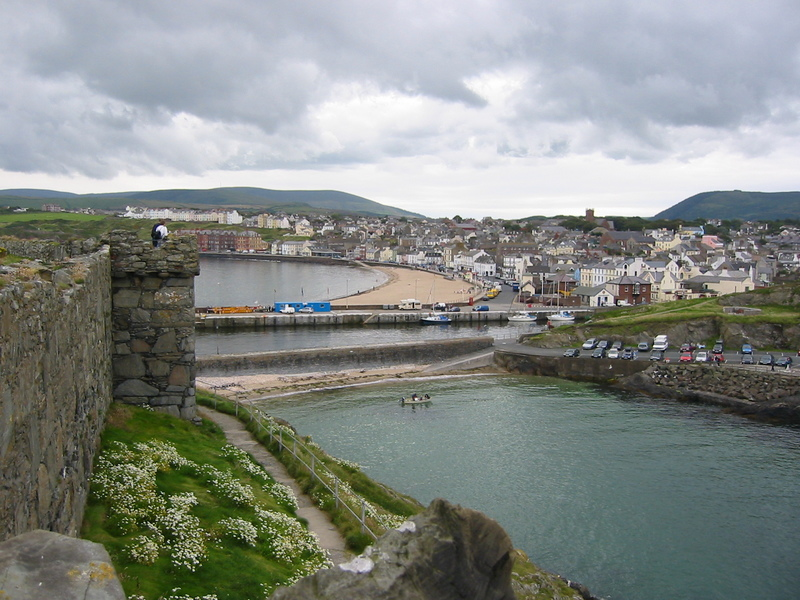

The building that now forms a display area for the House of Manannan was originally the terminus of the Isle of Man Railway. The building replaced the wooden original built for the opening in 1873. It was built in 1911 partly from local sandstone. Peel is the most intact of the line's closed stations, with the station itself, water tower (now part of a transport museum) and goods shed still extant. The goods shed now houses an audio-visual display area as part of the museum. At the eastern end of the station next to the water tower was once the locomotive shed, long since gone, but an original four-wheel coach body is now on site as a potential restoration project for the museum group. The quayside on which the site sits has been considerably redeveloped in the last few years. Many nearby buildings have been overhauled and repainted in period style and the area is a popular destination with visitors. The River Neb, next to the station site, has also had a marina facility installed with a toilet and shower block close to the former locomotive shed. A replica fishtail semaphore signal stands at the end of the station yard, together with a small set of replica level crossing gates, marking the location of the former railway line.

== Route ==
Preceding station	Disused railways	Following station
Terminus	Isle of Man Railway; Peel Line	St John's towards Douglas
Terminus	Isle of Man Railway; Knockaloe Branch	Knockaloe Internment Camp 1915-1920

== See also ==
- Isle of Man Railway stations

== Bibliography ==
- Butt, R.V.J. (1995), The Directory of Railway Stations, Patrick Stephens, ISBN 1-85260-508-1
- St John Thomas, David, ed. (1985), Bradshaw's July 1922 Railway Guide, Guild Publishing
