= 1920 Isle of Man TT =

Annual motorcycle racing event

1920 Isle of Man Tourist Trophy
- Date: 15 & 17 June 1920
- Location: Douglas, Isle of Man
- Course: Isle of Man TT Mountain Course; 37.75 miles (60.75 km)
- Organiser: Auto-Cycle Union
- Secretary: T.W. Loughborough

Junior TT
- First: Cyril Williams, AJS
- Second: J. A. Watson-Bourne, Blackburne
- Third: J. Holroyd, Blackburne

Fastest lap
- Eric Williams; 44min. 6sec. 51.36 mph New record

Lightweight class
- First: R. O. Clark, Levis
- Second: Gus Kuhn, Levis
- Third: Frank W. Applebee, Levis

Senior TT
- First: Tommy de la Hay, Sunbeam
- Second: Duggie Brown, Norton
- Third: R. Brown, Sunbeam

Fastest lap
- George Dance; 40min. 43sec. 55.62 mph New record

The 1920 Isle of Man TT races was the first races to take place following the end of World War I. Official practice sessions started on 31 May with the races taking place on 15 and 17 June 1920.

The 350cc Junior TT race was won by Cyril Williams riding an AJS motor-cycle and the 250cc Lightweight class by R. O. Clark with a Levis machine. The first post-war Senior TT was won by Tommy de la Hay with a 500cc Sunbeam bike.

== Races ==
=== Junior TT 350cc race ===
The Junior TT race was initially led by Eric Williams, the winner of the 1914 Junior TT race riding an AJS and set a new Junior lap record of 44 minutes and 6 seconds, an average speed of 51.36 mph. A mechanical retirement for Eric Williams allowed Cyril Williams also riding an AJS to build up an impressive lead of 20 minutes. However, Cyril Williams hit gear-box problems at the Creg-ny-Baa corner on the last lap and free-wheeled and pushed to the finish-line located at the Nobles Park playing fields in the town of Douglas. The winning margin for Williams was 9 minutes and 50 seconds from Jack Watson-Bourne, riding for Blackburne motorcycles in 4 hours, 37 minutes and 57 seconds, at an average race speed of 40.74 mph.

=== Lightweight TT 250cc race ===
The Lightweight class within Junior TT race was won by R. O. Clark riding a Levis and he may have won the event overall but was thrown from his Levis motor-cycle at the Creg-ny-Baa after a puncture on the last lap. After completing the race on a bent front wheel-rim he was detained in Nobles Hospital after the race with physical exhaustion.

=== Senior TT 500 race ===
The Senior TT race was won by Tommy de la Hay riding a Sunbeam at an average race speed of 51.79 mph from local Isle of Man competitor Duggie Brown riding a Norton. A new lap record was set by George Dance riding a Sunbeam of 40 minutes and 43 seconds, an average speed of 55.62 mph. AJS thought they could repeat the success of the 1914 Junior TT with a newly developed 2.75 hp (2.05 kW) ohv-engined machine. While Cyril Williams won the Junior race for AJS, H. R. Davies, also on the AJS team, retired from both races with engine trouble.

=== Race awards and classes ===
The 1920 Junior TT race included for the first time a new Lightweight TT class for motorcycles of 250 cc engine capacity. R. O. Clark riding for the Levis marque finished in 4th place overall and was within the 30 minute limit for The Motor Cycle Cup Trophy for the smaller 250cc motor-cycles.

== Race results ==
=== Junior TT 350cc ===
Held on 15 June 1920, at 9:30 am over a distance of 188.75 miles (5 laps of 37.75 miles each), limited to machines of cylinder capacity not exceeding 350cc., with a class for 250 cc. engines run concurrently for The Motor Cycle cup. Out of 32 entries, comprising 8 two-strokes, 16 four-stroke Singles, 7 Flat Twins and 1 V Twin, twenty-four started the race and only eleven finished.

The 9th International Isle of Man Tourist Trophy

Pos	#	Rider	Bike	Cyl.	Junior TT and Lightweight class race classification			
Pos	#	Rider	Bike	Cyl.	Laps	Time	Speed	Prizes & Remarks
1	4	(United Kingdom) Cyril Williams	2¾ hp AJS 349cc	1	5	4:37.57	40.74 mph	1st Prize - Winner of Junior Trophy, £40 and a gold medal.
2	15	(United Kingdom) Jack Watson-Bourne	2¾ hp Blackburne 348cc	1	5	4:47.07	39.44 mph	2nd Prize - £20 and a gold medal.
3	17	(United Kingdom) Jack Holroyd	2¾ hp Blackburne 348cc	1	5	4:47.37	39.37 mph	2nd Prize - £10 and a gold medal.
4	25	(United Kingdom) Ronald Clark	2¼ hp Levis 247cc	1	5	4:55.37	38.31 mph	1st in Lightweight class - Winner of The Motor Cycle Trophy and a gold medal.
5	32	(United Kingdom) Eric Longden	2¾ hp DOT (348cc JAP)	2	5	5:11.02	36.41 mph	First twin-cylinder.
6	27	(United Kingdom) R.W. Loughton	2¾ hp Douglas 348cc	2	5	5:15.52	36.34 mph	
7	14	(United Kingdom) Gus Kuhn	2¼ hp Levis 247cc	1	5	5:19.35	35.43 mph	2nd in Lightweight class and a gold medal
8	20	(United Kingdom) Harry Prescott	2¾ hp AJS 349cc	1	5	5:55.46	31.83 mph	
9	13	(United Kingdom) Frank W. Applebee	2¼ hp Levis 247cc	1	5	6:05.21	30.99 mph	3rd in Lightweight class. The Nesbit trophy for pluck and endurance.
10	1	(United Kingdom) Sidney Haden	2½ hp New Comet (293cc Climax)	1	5	6:11.31	30.48 mph	
11	9	(United Kingdom) Percy Dallison	3 hp Ivy 349cc	1	5	6:17.32	29.99 mph	
DNF	12	(United Kingdom) A.E. Wills	2¾ hp Douglas 348cc	2	3	Crashed on lap 4 at Creg-ny-Baa without doing himself any damage.		
DNF	3	(United Kingdom) Harry Harris	2¾ hp AJS 349cc	1	2	Retired on lap 3 at Ramsey Hairpin.		
DNF	6	(United Kingdom) Howard R. Davies	2¾ hp AJS 349cc	1	2	Retired on lap 3 due to broken exhaust valve just below the Bungalow.		
DNF	7	(United Kingdom) Eric Williams	2¾ hp AJS 349cc	1	2	Retired on lap 3, while leading the race, due to broken mainshaft 500 yards from the Bungalow.		
DNF	11	(United Kingdom) A.F. Houlberg	2¾ hp Wooler 350cc	2	2	Retired on lap 3 near Ballacraine due to broken connecting rod.		
DNF	23	(United Kingdom) Phil Pike	2¼ hp Diamond 249cc	1	2	Retired on lap 3 at Creg-ny-Baa due to broken exhaust valve.		
DNF	19	(United Kingdom) Stan Marks	2¾ hp Diamond 349cc	1	1	Retired on lap 2 between Braddan and Union Mills, bearings gave out.		
DNF	2	(United Kingdom) Ossie Wade	2¾ hp AJS 349cc	1	0	Retired on first lap at Ballaugh due to engine trouble.		
DNF	5	(Isle of Man) Tom Sheard	2¾ hp AJS 349cc	1	0	Retired on first lap at Sulby with valve trouble.		
DNF	16	(United Kingdom) P.J. Enticknapp	2¾ hp Blackburne 348cc	1	0	Retired on first lap due to sheared key on the flywheel.		
DNF	18	(United Kingdom) Norman Sclater, jun.	3 hp Aurora (331cc Dalm)	1	0	Retired on first lap at Hillberry due to broken release valve.		
DNF	21	(United Kingdom) Albert Milner	2¾ hp Diamond 349cc	1	0	Retired on first lap at Kirkmichael due to a broken valve cup.		
DNF	28	(Scotland) Alfie Alexander	2¾ hp Douglas 348cc	2	0	Retired on first lap due to engine trouble near Glen Helen		
DNS	1	(United Kingdom) L.W. Clement	2½ hp New Comet (293cc Climax)	1		Was replaced by Sidney Haden.		
DNS	4	(United Kingdom) N.C. Heath	2¾ hp AJS 349cc	1		Collided with marshals during practice, as taken to a hospital and was replaced by the eventual race winner Cyril Williams.		
DNS	5	(United Kingdom) T.H. Haddock	2¾ hp AJS 349cc	1		Crashed during practice at Keppel Gate was taken to hospital. Suffered head injuries.		
DNS	8	(United Kingdom) George Cowley, Senr.	2¾ hp AJS 349cc	1		Skidded at Governor's Bridge during practicing.		
DNS	10	(United Kingdom) J.H. Dowell	2¾ hp Wooler 350cc	2				
DNS	22	(United Kingdom) Bert Houlding	2¾ hp Diamond 349cc	1				
DNS	24	(United Kingdom) F.J. Price	2¾ hp Diamond 349cc	1				
DNS	26	(Isle of Man) Jimmy Oates	3 hp Aurora (331cc Dalm)	1				
DNS	29	(United Kingdom) E. Greenwood	2¾ hp Douglas 348cc	2				
DNS	30	(United Kingdom) J.S. Clayton	2¾ hp Wooler 350cc	2				
DNS	31	(United Kingdom) T.P. Lewis	2¼ hp Levis 247cc	1				
Fastest lap: Eric Williams, 44min. 6sec. 51.36 mph (New record)

=== Senior TT 500cc final standings ===
Held on June 17, at 9:30 am over a distance of 226.50 miles (6 laps of 37.75 miles each), limited to machines of cylinder capacity not exceeding 500cc. Out of 29 entries, comprising 21 four-stroke singles, 5 V Twins, 3 Flat Twins and no two-strokes. Twenty-seven riders started the race and fourteen finished.

The 9th International Isle of Man Tourist Trophy

Pos	#	Rider	Bike	Cyl.	Senior TT race classification			
Pos	#	Rider	Bike	Cyl.	Laps	Time	Speed	Prizes & Remarks
1	66	(United Kingdom) Tommy de la Hay	3½ hp Sunbeam 499cc	1	6	4:22.23	51.79 mph	1st Prize - Winner of Senior Trophy, £50 and a gold medal.
2	56	(Isle of Man) Douglas Brown	3½ hp Norton 490cc	1	6	4:26.13	51.05 mph	2nd Prize - £25 and a medal from Manx Motor-Cycle Club.
3	70	(United Kingdom) Reg Brown	3½ hp Sunbeam 499cc	1	6	4:32.27	49.88 mph	3rd Prize - £15 and a medal from Manx Motor-Cycle Club. 1st Private entry.''
4	67	(United Kingdom) Norman Sclater. jun.	3½ hp Norton 490cc	1	6	4:39.47	48.57 mph	Gold medal.
5	53	(United Kingdom) Reuben Harveyson	3½ hp Indian Scout 496.8cc	2	6	4:40.25	48.46 mph	Gold medal. 1st Twin-cylinder machine.
6	51	(Scotland) Douglas Alexander	3½ hp Indian Scout 496.8cc	2	6	4:41.25	48.30 mph	Gold medal. 2nd twin-cylinder machine.
7	57	(Northern Ireland) Jimmy Shaw	3½ hp Norton 490cc	1	6	4:51.46	46.57 mph	Gold medal.
8	58	(United Kingdom) Noel H. Brown	3½ hp Norton 490cc	1	6	4:54.24	46.16 mph	
9	64	(United Kingdom) Frank Townshend	3½ hp Sunbeam 499cc	1	6	4:54.29	46.148 mph	
10	63	(United Kingdom) Lieut. Charlie North	3½ hp Norton 490cc	1	6	5:01.05	45.13 mph	Broken saddle delayed him in the first lap.
11	79	(United Kingdom) Norman Black	3½ hp Norton 490cc	1	6	5:08.26	44.06 mph	Suffered multiple punctured and belt-stops. Rode last 30 miles with no bearings in the back hub.
12	52	(United Kingdom) Freddie Dixon	3½ hp Indian Scout 496.8cc	2	6	5:17.12	42.84 mph	
13	59	(United Kingdom) Graham Walker	3½ hp Norton 490cc	1	6	5:24.50	41.83 mph	
14	76	(Wales) Jack Thomas	3½ hp Norton 490cc	1	6	5:53.21	38.463 mph	
DNF	75	(Wales) Capt. Alexander Lindsay, M.B.	3½ hp Norton 490cc	1	4	Retired on lap 5 near Ballaugh. Engine trouble.		
DNF	69	(United Kingdom) Bert le Vack	3½ hp Duzmo 496cc	1	4	Fell on lap 5 near Bungalow. Escaped unhurt.		
DNF	61	(United Kingdom) Harold Petty	3½ hp Norton 490cc	1	3	Dry-skidded on lap 4 at Ramsey. Damaged front fork.		
DNF	74	(Scotland) Alfred Alexander	3½ hp Douglas 494cc	2	3	Retired at the end of lap 4 in pits, with belt fastener trouble, after taking 1½ hours for lap 3.		
DNF	54	(United Kingdom) Bert Houlding	3½ hp Indian Scout 496.8cc	2	3	Retired on lap 4. Tyre trouble at Union Mills.		
DNF	65	(United Kingdom) George Dance	3½ hp Sunbeam 499cc	1	2	Retired on lap 3 near Creg-ny-Baa due to broken inlet valve.		
DNF	62	(United Kingdom) Victor Horsman	3½ hp Norton 490cc	1	2	Toured in at the end lap 3 due to partial engine seizure at Bungalow		
DNF	55	(United Kingdom) Vivian Olsson	3½ hp Norton 490cc	1	2	Crashed on lap 3 at Windy Corner, brake gear fouled chain.		
DNF	68	(United Kingdom) Tom Simister	3½ hp Norton 490cc	1	2	Retired on lap 3 at Hillberry due to broken piston.		
DNF	68	(United Kingdom) Eric Williams	3½ hp Sunbeam 499cc	1	2	Dry-skidded on lap 3 into a wooden gate at Quarterbridge due to jammed brake. Escaped unhurt.		
DNF	72	(United Kingdom) E.S. Abram	3 hp ABC 400cc	2	1	Retired on lap 2. Valve trouble at Crosby.		
DNF	60	(United Kingdom) Howard R. Davies	2¾ hp AJS 349cc	1	1	Retired on lap 2. Engine trouble at Kirkmichael.		
DNF	78	(United Kingdom) Reg. Lucas	3 hp ABC 400cc	2	0	Retired on first lap at Ramsey with broken valve		
DNS	77	(United Kingdom) S.J. Redmond	3½ hp Indian Scout 496.8cc	2		Withdraw during preliminary stages.		
DNS	73	(United Kingdom) A.J. Moffat	3½ hp Norton 490cc	1		Damaged his machine in practice and was unable to find another.		
Fastest lap: George Dance, 40min. 43sec. 53.62 mph (New record)

== Notes ==
- During the first practice session, T.H. Haddock riding an AJS in the Junior race crashed at Keppel Gate. George Cowley crashed at Governor's Bridge and Graham Walker, riding for Norton in the Senior class, hit sheep in the mist on the Snaefell Mountain section.
- During the Saturday practice D.S. Alexander riding an Indian Scout at number 51 in the Senior turned off the course at Braddan Bridge and rejoined at Hillberry and set a time of 39 minutes and 10 seconds!
- Prize Money awarded for the Junior race was: 1st place £40, 2nd place £20 and 3rd place £10. A gold finisher's award was made for each competitor completing the race within 30 minutes of the winner. The Motor Cycle magazine Gold Cup was awarded to Eric Williams for setting the fastest lap of 44 minutes and 6 seconds.
- Prize Money awarded for the Senior race was: 1st place £50, 2nd place £25 and 3rd place £15.
