= Levis (motorcycle) =

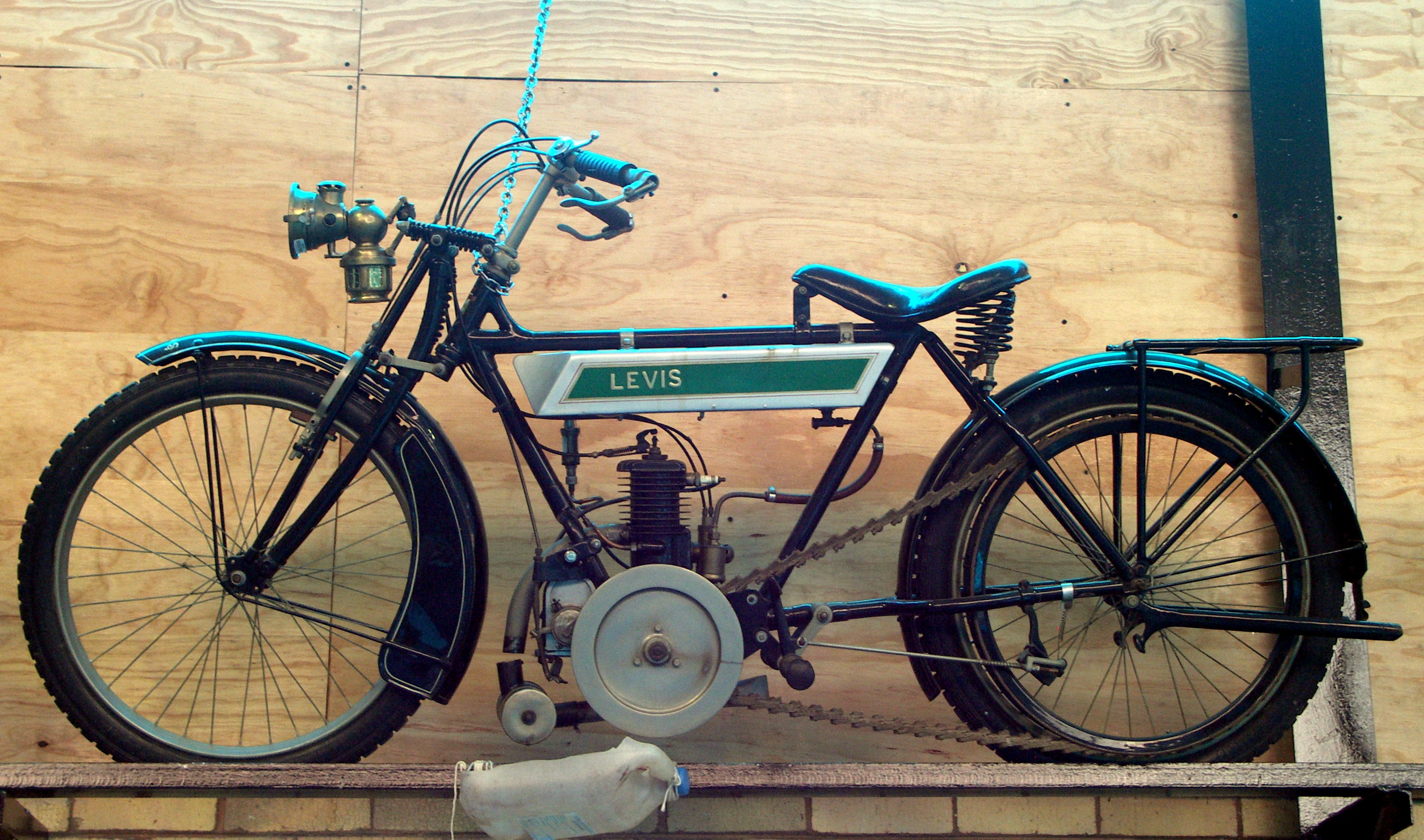
A Levis motorcycle with the distinctive belt drive

Levis motorcycles (1911–1940), manufactured by Butterfields Ltd. of Birmingham, England were for many years one of England's leading marques of two-stroke motorcycle. Levis built two-stroke machines from 1911, adding a line of four-strokes in 1928, which ran to 1941 when production ceased.

The first Levis was made in the Norton works by designer Howard (Bob) Newey, but James Norton turned it down.

Newey then joined with the Butterfields, Arthur and Billy, and sister Daisy, to set up a motorcycle company (Newey later married Daisy). Their first model had a capacity of 211 cc.

== Two-strokes ==
In 1916, the 211 cc vertical two-stroke engine produced 3 hp (2.2 kW). An enclosed chain from the crankshaft drove the Fellows magneto, and drive to the rear wheel was by Pedley 'Vee' belt. The machine weighed approximately 120 lb (54 kg).

Their first racing success was in the Lightweight 250 class within the 1920 Isle of Man TT Junior race with a 247 cc machine, repeated in the 1922 TT Lightweight TT race. They then adopted the slogan, "The Master Two Stroke".

Levis built 211 cc and 246 cc three-port single-cylinder machines, including sporting versions. Most had 67 mm (2.6 in) bore with a 70 mm (2.8 in) stroke, and there was also a six-port model.

== Four-strokes ==
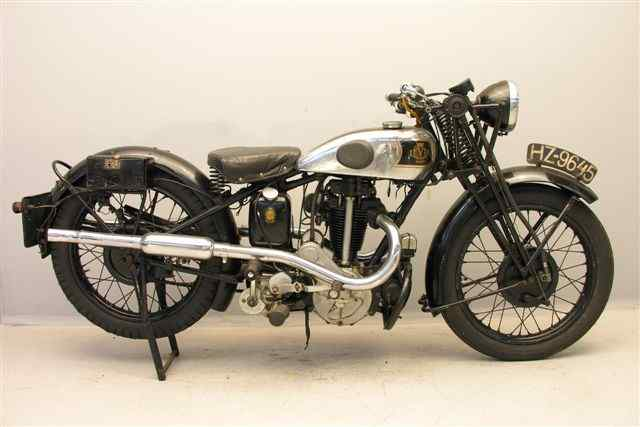
1932 OHV 350 cc

From 1928 onward, Levis produced 247 cc (67 mm (2.6 in) bore x 70 mm (2.8 in) stroke) and 346 cc (70 mm bore x 90 mm stroke) four-stroke ohv machines and later added 498 cc and 600 cc ohv four-strokes. For a brief period, a 346 cc side valve single, and also a 247 cc sohc single with chain-driven overhead camshaft were available.

== Competition ==
Levis two strokes, ridden by Geoff Davison, R. O. Clark, Phil Pike and others, won many races including the 1922 Lightweight TT, while the four strokes excelled off-road. Percy Hunt rode a 346 cc model successfully in races, and just before World War II, Bob Foster gained many wins on a Levis ohv 598 cc bike in trials and moto cross.

== Present ==
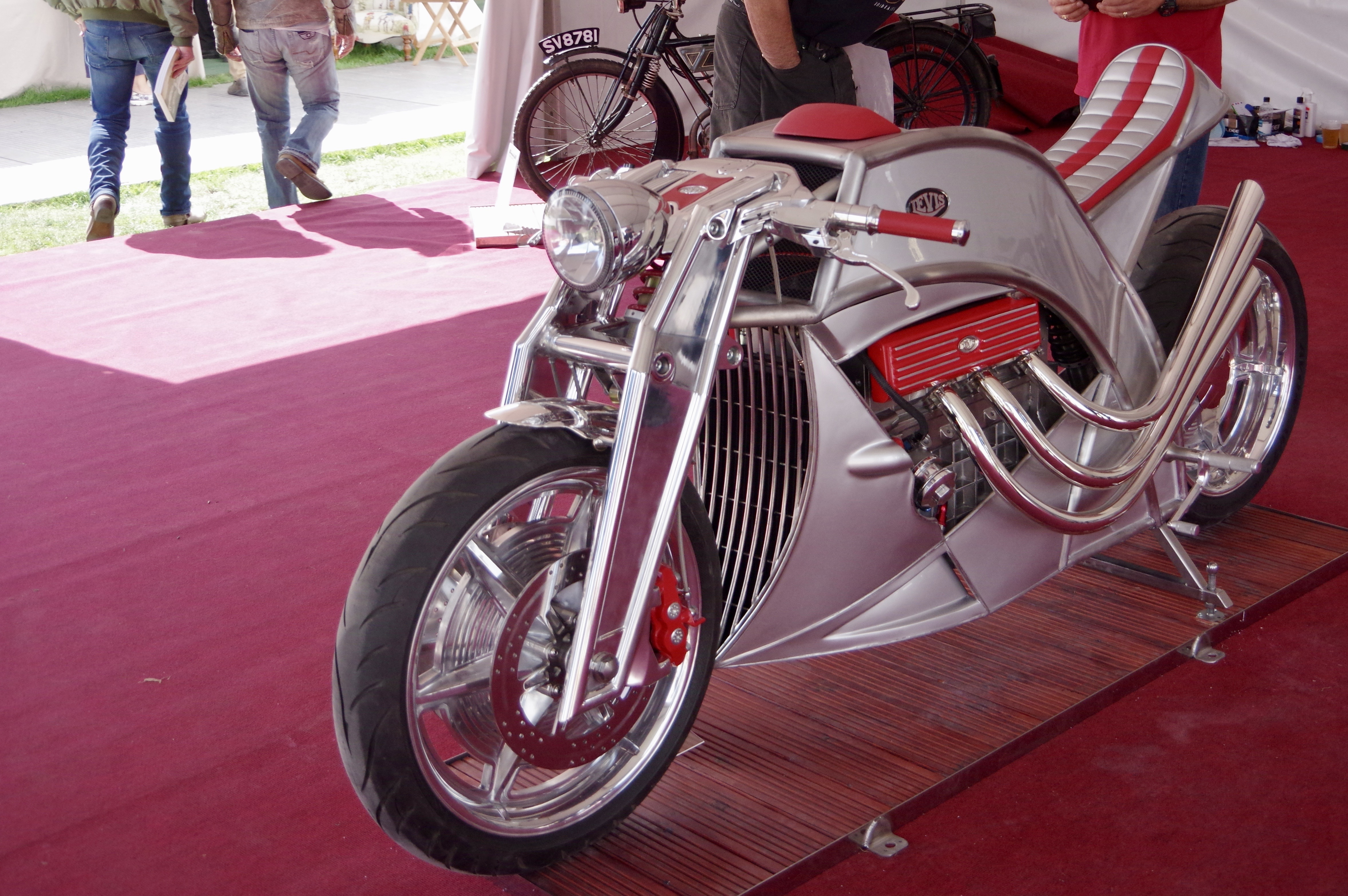
Levis Café Racer concept at Goodwood Revival 2018

In 2014, the brand of Levis motorcycles was acquired by David Redshaw of the Auto Crowd Group, a business providing online car, motorcycle, yacht, and aviation clubs.

In 2017, the Levis name was sold to Phil Bevan of engineering firm Bevan Davidson International (BDI). Following a public announcement in 2018, work began on reviving the Levis brand. Development of the Levis V6 Café Racer later started, which was firstly planned to use the 2.0 litre V10 engine from the Connaught Type D sports car (a company also acquired by BDI), although a V6 was later deemed more suitable. Production was originally scheduled for 2018, with an initial batch of six bikes, priced at £52,000. Production has not yet materialised, although development on a range of motorcycles continues.

== Models ==
- 1911–1925 211 cc Levis (TS Model 'Popular')
- 1926 246 cc Levis (TS Model 'K')
- 1927 246 cc Levis (TS Model 'O')
- 1928 346 cc Levis (OHV Model 'A')
- 1938 496 cc Levis (OHV Model 'D-Special')

(TS = Two Stroke)
