= Quarterbridge (disambiguation) =

Quarterbridge may refer to:

- Quarterbridge, Isle of Man, (or Quarter Bridge), a major road junction and TT race vantage point over River Glass on the outskirts of Douglas town, Isle of Man
- Quarterbridge Road, a main connecting road in the Isle of Man leading from Bray Hill to Quarterbridge road junction
- Quarterbridge Crossing, a defunct historic gated railway crossing point on the outskirts of Douglas town, Isle of Man
