= Connaught Motor Company =

Former UK hybrid car manufacturer

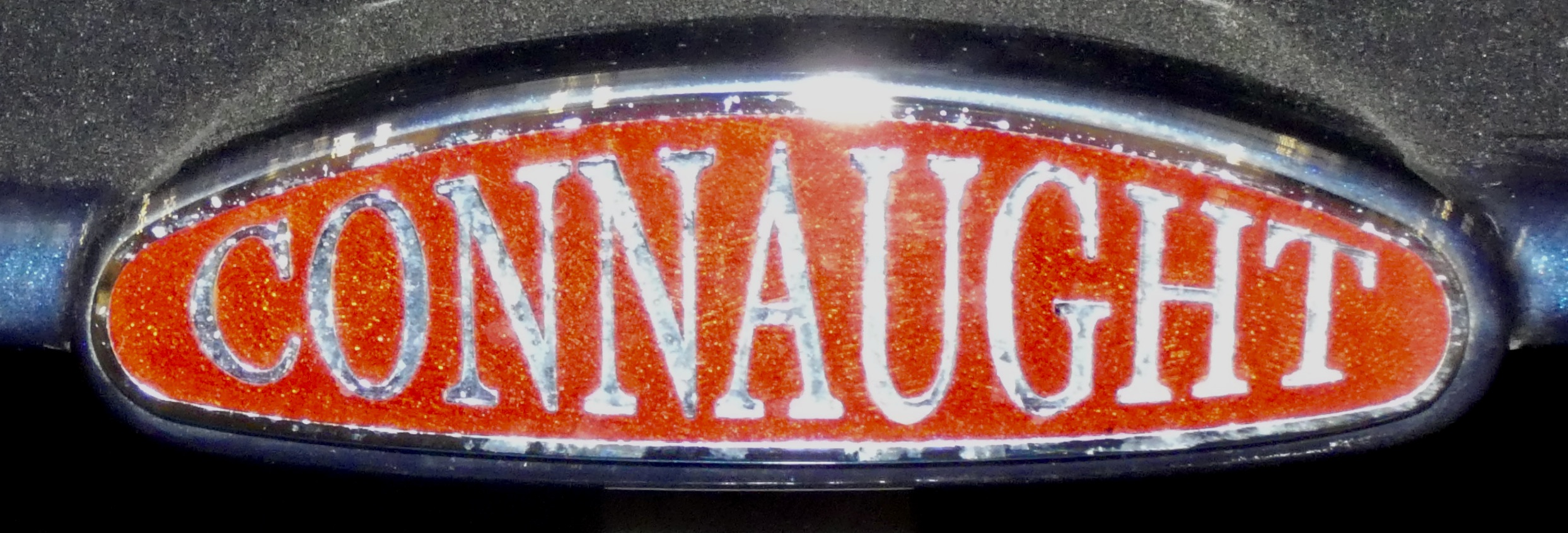
- Type: Car manufacturer
- Founded: 2004
- Founder: Edward Timothy Bishop, Anthony Martindale

Connaught Motor Company is a British manufacturer of high-performance hybrid technology cars, best known for the Type D hybrid sports car concept. The company was founded by ex-Jaguar engineers Tim Bishop and Tony Martindale in 2004.

Due to a lack of funds, the company was closed in 2016, and was later bought by Welsh engineering firm BDI.

== History ==
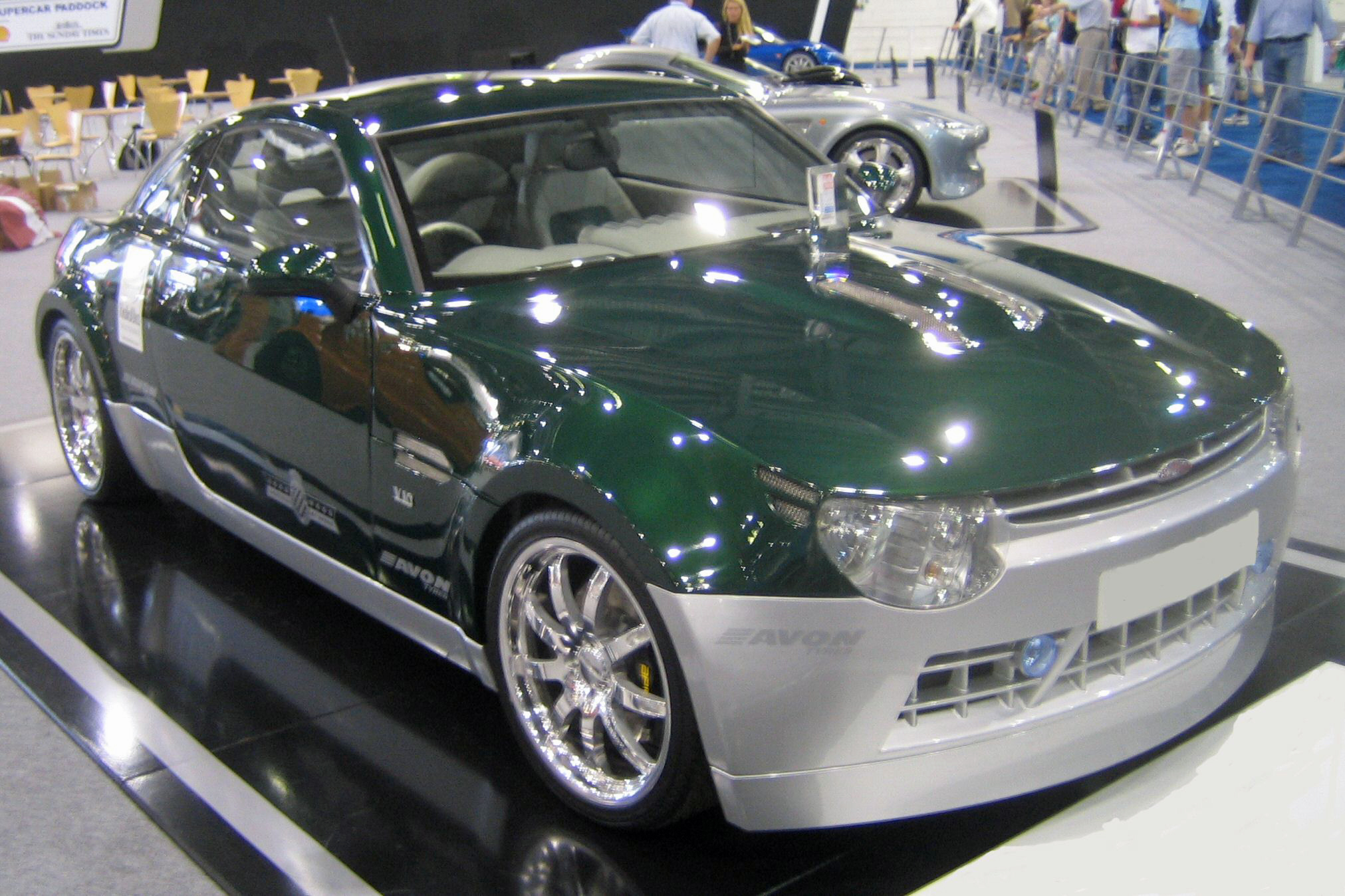
Connaught Type D Syracuse, 2006

In 2002, the Connaught Engineering name was purchased by ex-Jaguar engineers Edward Timothy 'Tim' Bishop and Anthony Martindale and was officially founded as a company in 2004. Later that year, Bishop and Martindale announced at the years Goodwood festival that they would build a sports car powered by their own drivetrain.

In 2005, in celebration of Tony Brooks 1955 Syracuse Grand Prix with Connaught, the company announced plans for the Type D sports car. The Type D was a 2.0 litre V10 hybrid sports car producing 300hp, capable of reaching 60mph in 6.2 seconds. Due to its hybrid drivetrain, Connaught received funding from the British Government to produce the car and announced the Type D as the world's first 'green supercar'. A working prototype of the car was revealed in 2007, although it did not feature the much anticipated hybrid drivetrain, and the price of the car had increased from £35,000 to £45,000.

Connaught later announced that the hybrid version of the Type D was on hold, and the more conventionally powered Type D Syracuse would be sold first in order to raise more money to produce the hybrid drivetrain.

The company subsequently received a grant from the British Government in order to set up a facility in South Wales, although additional funding was still needed, and current chairman Fred-Page Roberts was seeking further funding for the company. During the 2008 financial crisis, the Welsh Government and Connaught's creditor banks failed to meet their commitments to the business, and the level of investment needed to industrialize the company failed to materialize.

Following a failed relaunch in 2014, the company was dissolved in 2016.

Fred Page-Roberts, the company's original backer, also launched a small start-up electric vehicle company, likely based on his experiences in Connaught.

The company is not to be confused with a business that has used the brand for second-hand cars and was fined for selling its cars without a street trading licence.

=== Revival ===
In 2020, Connaught Engineering was acquired by Wales based engineering firm Bevan Davidson International (BDI), bringing back the possibility of production for the Type D. After the takeover, Edward Timothy Bishop retained his place as head of the company. BDI subsequently revealed a sketch of the Connaught Villiers X20, a supercar equipped with a 4.0-litre V20 engine, created by merging two V10 engines together. If produced, the X20 would succeed the Type D as the company's flagship model, albeit remaining a one-off vehicle.
