= Douglas railway station =

Railway station in Isle of Man, UK

Douglas Railway Station Stashoon Raad-Yiarn Ghoolish
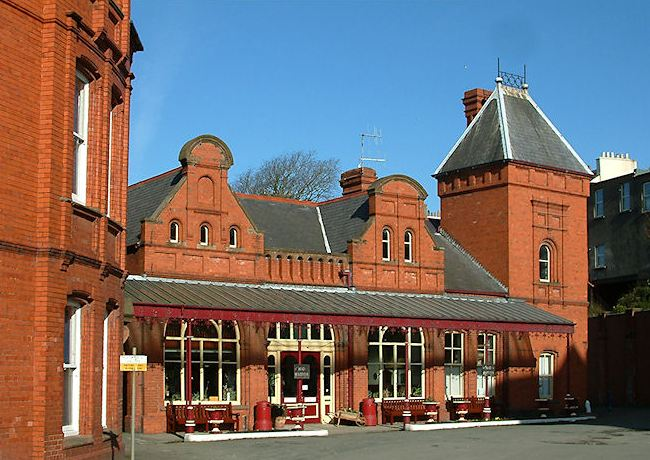
- Main building

General information
- Location: Banks Circus, Lake Road, Douglas, Isle of Man IM1 1BR
- Coordinates: 54°8′52″N 4°29′10″W
- System: The Isle of Man Railway Co., Ltd.
- Owner: Isle of Man Government; Department of Infrastructure
- Lines: Port Erin (South) Line; Between Douglas & Port Erin
- Platforms: Two, raised full-height (formerly four, raised full-height)
- Tracks: Two long island platforms, various sidings and run-rounds

History
- Opened: 1 July 1873
- Closed: 1965–1966 (railway closed); 1975–1976 (short-Line working); 1977-date (seasonally)
- Rebuilt: 1887 / 1901 / 1991 / 2016

Passengers
- Passenger Only (Since 1969, goods previously)

Services
Dedicated Parking, Refreshments, Patrons' Toilets, Waiting Area, Booking Hall, Historic Displays
Location

Douglas Railway Station (Manx: Stashoon Raad Yiarn Ghoolish) is the main terminus of the Isle of Man Railway and is located at the landward end of the quay in Douglas, the capital of the Isle of Man. It was once the hub for now closed lines to Peel, Ramsey and Foxdale.

== Location ==
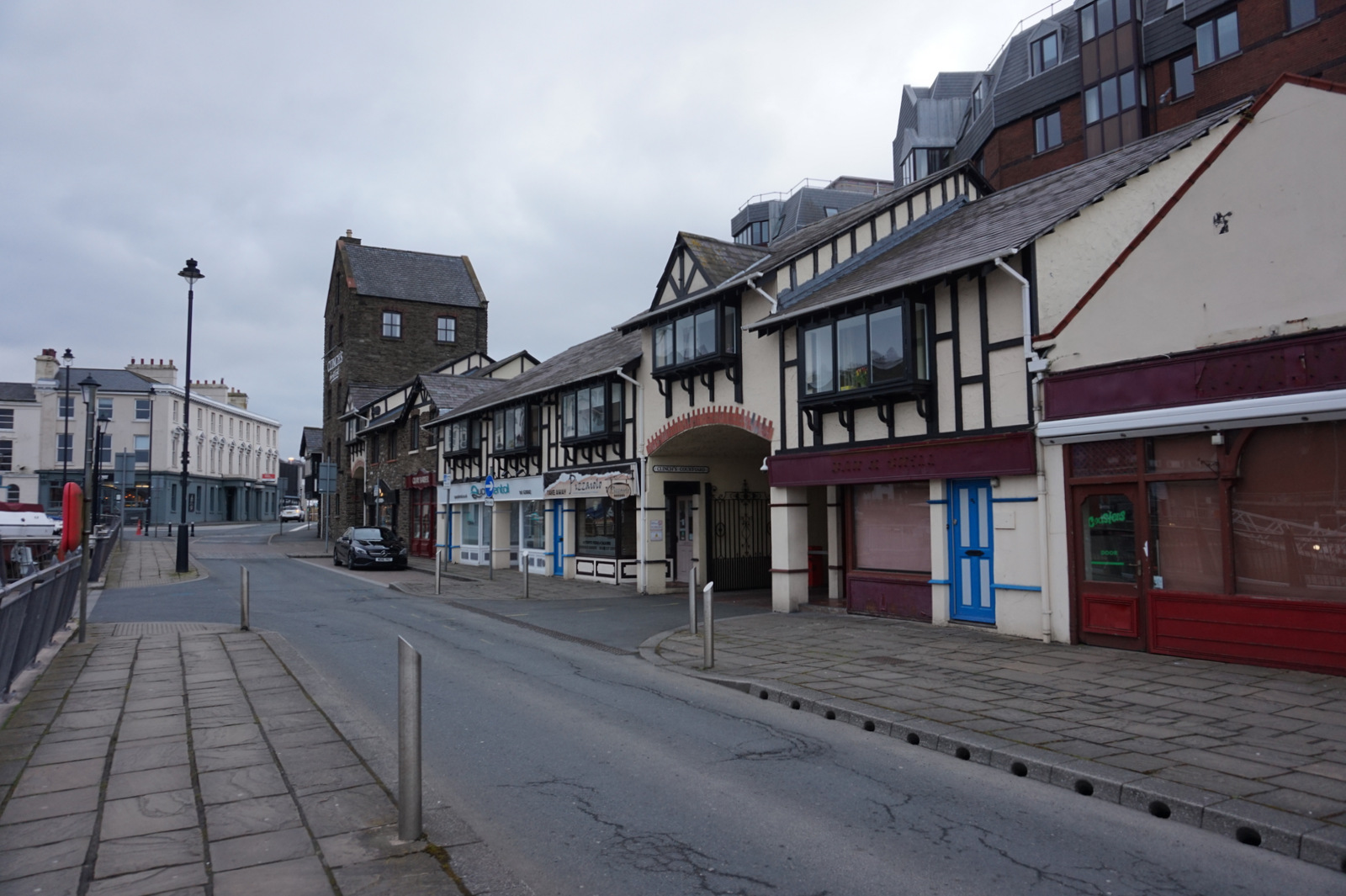
The north quay a short distance from the lower entrance to the station with the tower of the former Clinch's Brewery in the distance.

The station is located on the southern side of the island's capital, Douglas, and is at the far landward end of the North quay close to the old town and finance centre. It has car parking available for railway patrons on the site of the former goods yard and departure platforms and is served by nearby bus services from many locations on the island. The current station buildings in red Ruabon brick were constructed between 1887 and 1913 replacing timber constructions established upon the opening of the line in 1873. The site was reclaimed from marshland, the nearby Lake Road attesting this fact.

== History ==
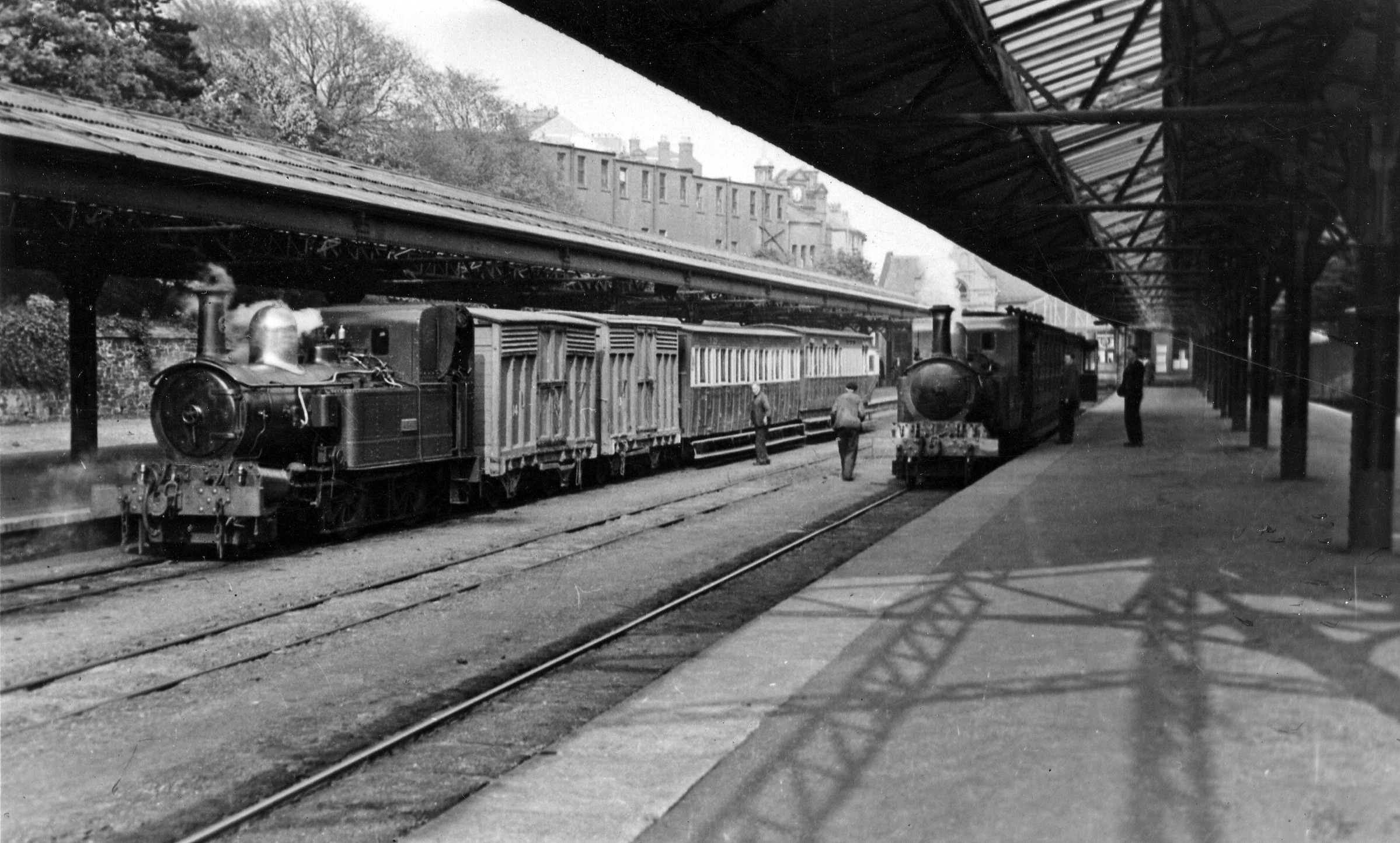
No.6 Peveril (left) and No.13 Kissack at the station in 1951.

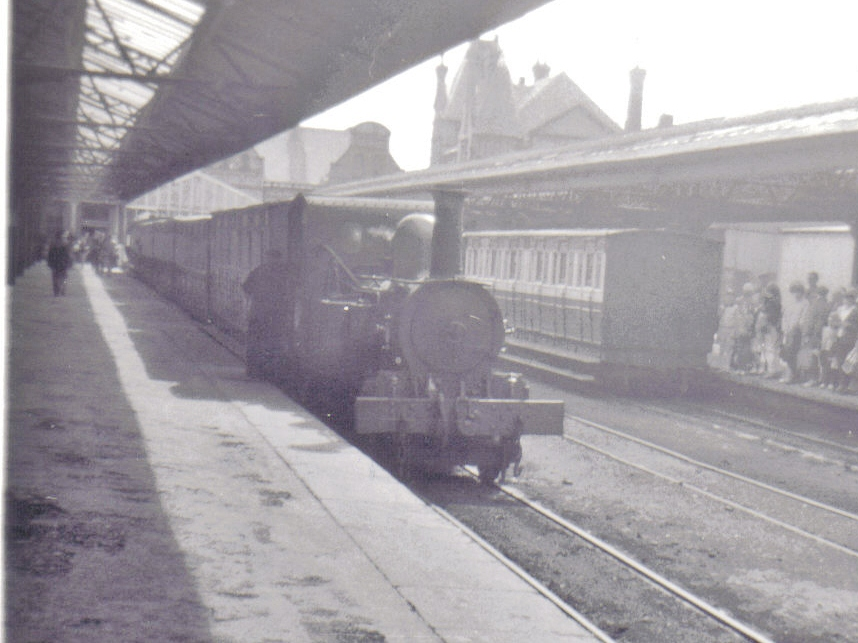
No.8 Fenella at the station in 1964 showing the glazed canopies and two platforms.

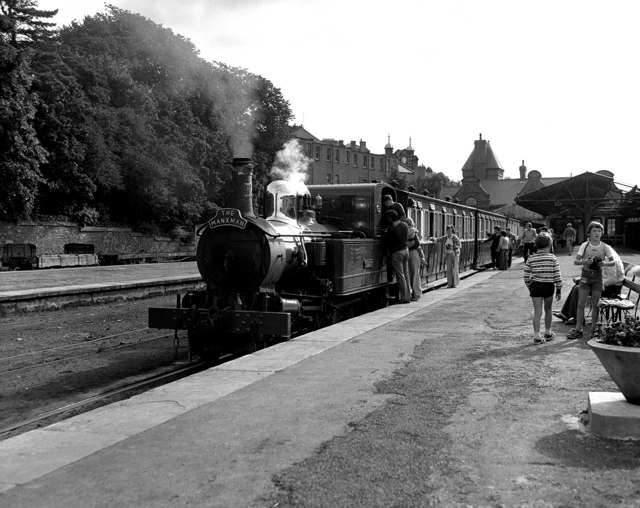
The Manxman headed by No.13 Kissack in 1979 using the original south line platform.

=== Origins ===
The Isle of Man Railway Company bought the site in 1872, and diverted the Douglas River to the south side of the site to ease construction of its new station. The original station building was a 70' by 30' wooden structure with a zinc tiled roof located approximately where the present booking hall now stands. This accommodated booking office, general and ladies' waiting rooms, telegraph office, parcels office, porters' room and stationmaster's office. Beyond this were two platforms, with an engine release, and siding between them, whilst on the south side were two sidings and a goods shed and platform. A warehouse stood on the site of the later office building. North of the track leading from the station, there stood a three road stone building original constructed as a locomotive and carriage shed, with a small maintenance area, but soon repurposed as a locomotive shed and workshop for the growing railway. The opening of the Port Erin line brought a modest expansion of the station with additional platform faces being added south of the original departure platform, and north of the arrival platform. This created two island platforms, the northern one of which was used for Peel trains, the southern for Port Erin trains. In 1875 a three road iron carriage shed was provided about where the Bus Vannin parking area is today, and between this and the running lines a rudimentary ground frame was constructed to control trains entering and leaving the station. The Peel and Port Erin lines then left the station as two parallel single lines with only a single crossover between them which allowed trains from Peel to access the goods yard.

=== Rebuilding ===
By the mid-1880s it was clear that rail traffic had outgrown the modest original station, and that rebuilding was necessary. This commenced in 1887 with the construction of offices, refreshment room and bar, and a new ladies' waiting room on the site of an old warehouse in the south east corner of the site. This was followed by a new booking hall and platforms (1891/2), a signal box (1892); a new carriage shed (1893); new workshop, locomotive shed, and carpenters' shop (1892–96); men's lavatory (1904); platform canopies (1909), and stables c.1913. This station remained largely intact until 1979 when the station was rationalized. The station, together with gateway and other structures, was listed as a Registered Building of the Isle of Man in 1984.

== Buildings ==
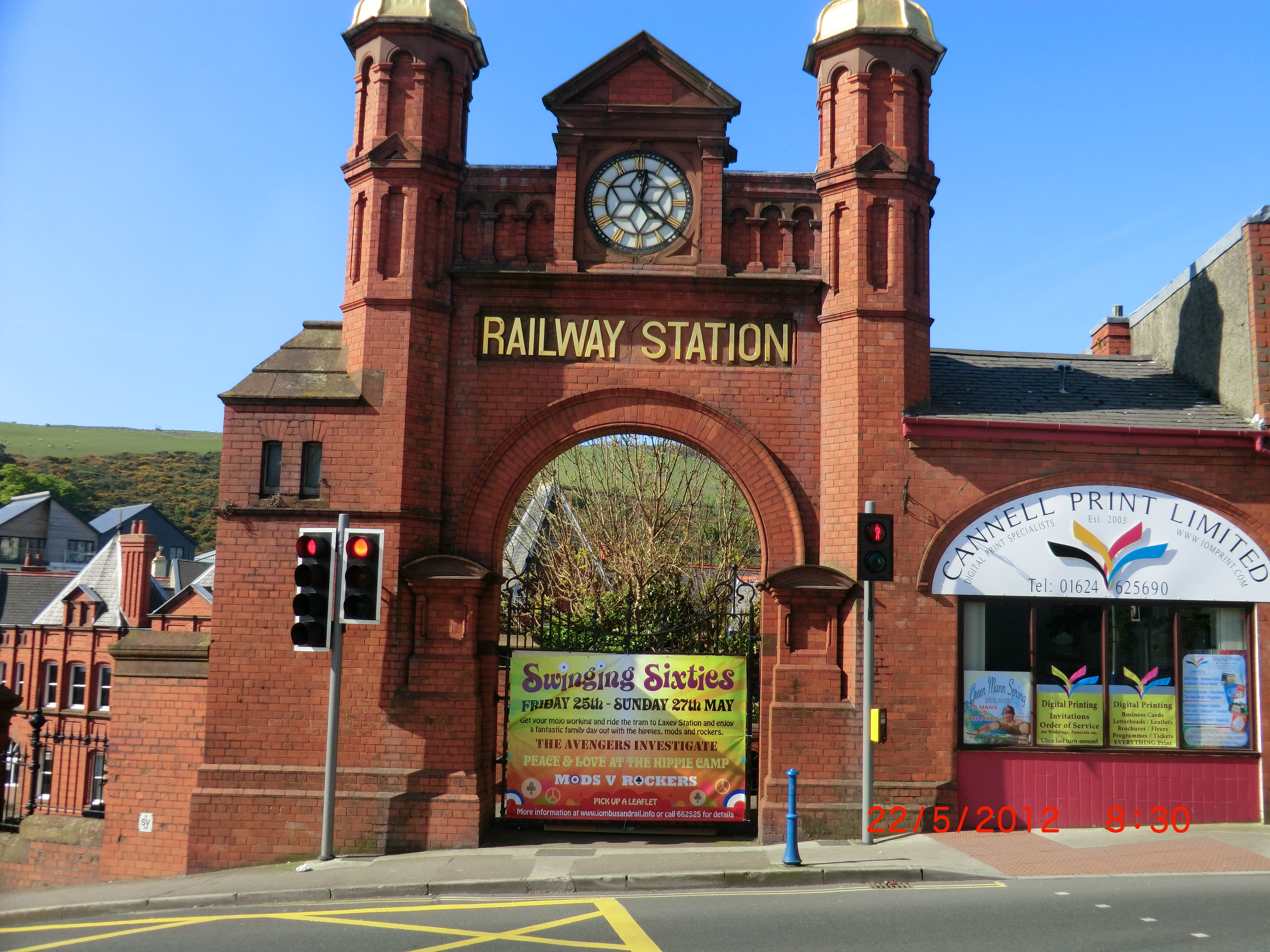
The imposing ornamental gateway, gold leaf turrets and clock tower at street level facing the end of Athol Street following the most recent 1990 renovations

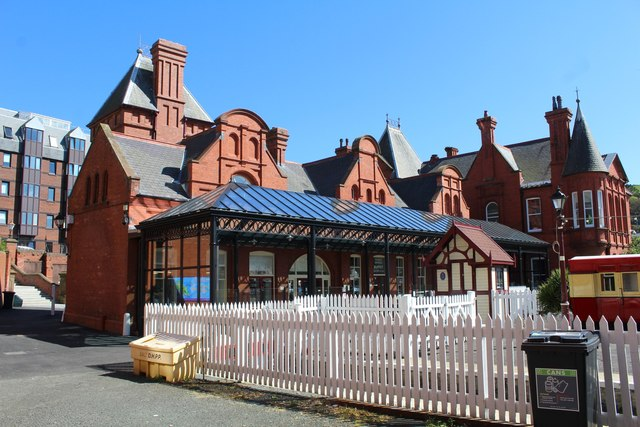
The modern station as it is today, with its new glazed canopy along its rear elevation and The Tickehall café occupying the former office space and ticket store.

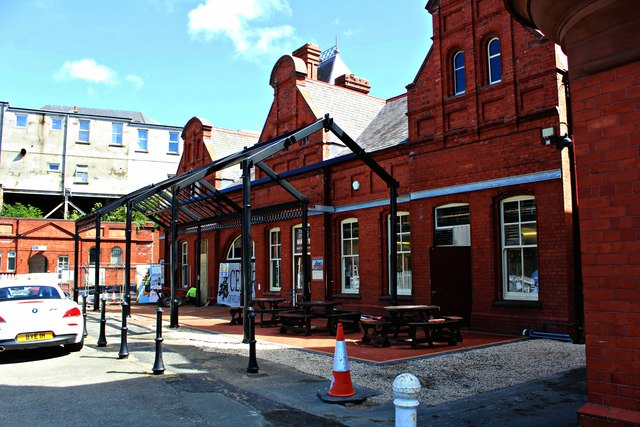
Construction of the new canopy ongoing in July 2016, the site of the former so-called "greenhouse" circulating area between the two island platforms.

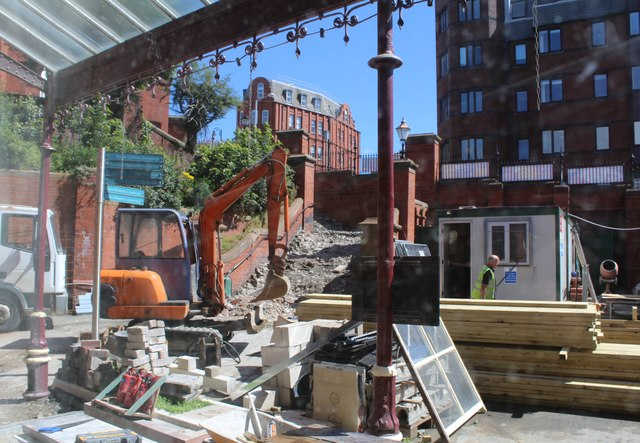
July 2016 and the forecourt in use as a works site with demolished steps to the main entrance which were rebuilt in similar style, with the 1909 canopy.

=== Entrances ===
The main entrance to the station is via a grand archway at the junction of Peel Road and Athol Street. This has two gilt-topped turrets and clock tower, between which are a set of steps descending to the station. These gates are usually closed, but there is a smaller gate on the left side of the structure which provides pedestrian access from Athol Street and the financial district. A second entrance at the bottom of the hill from North Quay provides level/vehicular access to the station.

=== Main buildings ===
Entering down the Peel Road steps, the visitor is faced with two large Ruabon brick buildings. The building ahead of the visitor, which is now used as the Customs House, was constructed as the railway's administrative offices in 1887, and also accommodated, on the ground floor, the Ladies' Waiting Room and lavatory, a licensed refreshment room, and bar. The building to the right is the main station building which originally housed the booking hall, ticket office, parcels office, porters' room, stationmaster's office, to provide storage for millions of card tickets and railway records. This building was designed in 1888, but not constructed until 1891/2, following the abandonment of plans for a steam railway from Douglas, via Quarter Bridge to Onchan and Laxey. The present iron and glass canopy across the front of the building was added in 1909.

=== Modification 1979–1980 ===
The former parcels office was adapted to provide management offices in 1979/80, but was vacated since management were relocated following the completion of Transport Headquarters at Banks Circus elsewhere on the site of the carriage shed in 1999. The souvenir shop was also established at this time, initially operated by the Isle of Man Steam Railway Supporters' Association and later by the railway itself. A café was established at this time in the former booking hall. The vacant upper floor was added to the office area at the north end of the building in 1979, and involved the introduction of a staircase into the building which now divides the original ticket office into two. At the same time, the booking hall floor was sealed using a resin material slightly raising the floor level,

=== Renovations 1990–1991 ===
Housing a restaurant (Greens), a mezzanine floor was installed during extensive interior works, the booking/stationmasters' office, and a tiny passenger waiting area. When the mezzanine and kitchen area were installed in 1990/1 a new wooden floor was laid on top of the original raising the floor level by a further 40 millimetres (1.6 in). At the same time, the 1920s ticket window, and 1979 souvenir shop in the centre of the booking hall were removed.

=== Maintenance 2011–2016 ===
In more recent years, the north end of the building has experience subsidence due to the presence of a main sewer at that end of the building, and there has been considerable deterioration of the disused office area at the north end of the building. In 2011, a major restoration scheme to underpin the north end of the building repair the roof, and possibly rebuild the old canopy over the circulating area was announced. Roof repairs were completed in 2013, but the rest of the scheme was subjected to a review, the results of which are discussed below. In the active part of the building, seating for the restaurant has increasingly encroached on the passenger facilities within the former booking hall.

=== Redevelopment 2016–2017 ===
The building saw further works undertaken in 2016 and turned into The Tickethall and the station masters' facilities removed and gift shop installed. This involved the removal of upper storeys, creation of kitchen and catering area, underpinning of the central internal wall which had become detached from the exterior walls, lift installation, disabled toilets, a new mezzanine to house the café, and retrofitting of some blocked up doorways. The resultant current layout is largely given over to catering with the former booking hall being a gift shop with open service desk rather than traditional ticket hatch, a replica of this remains in the wall as a historical reminder.

== Signal box ==
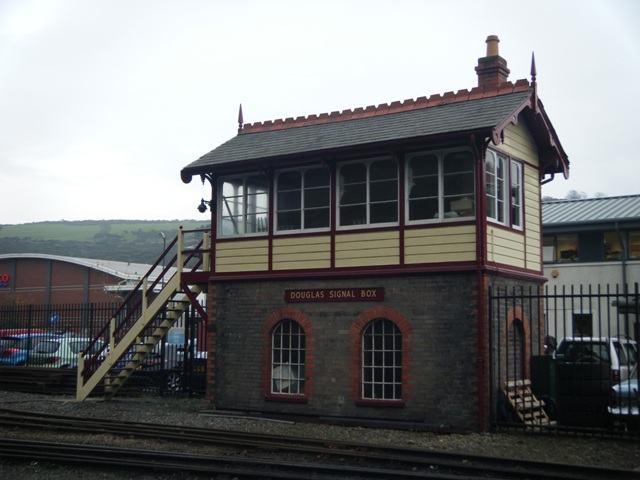
The signal box is located in a commanding position at the end of the yard but remains out of use.

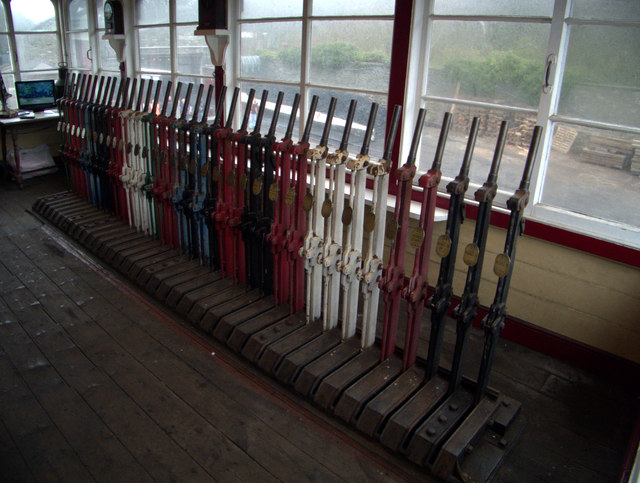
The remaining 32-level frame in the upper storey of the box, built by Duttons of Worcester

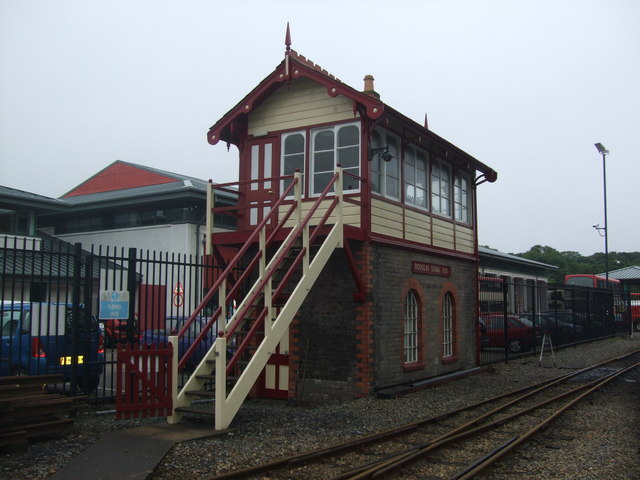
The steps to the signal box viewed from the end of the surviving departure and arrival platforms.

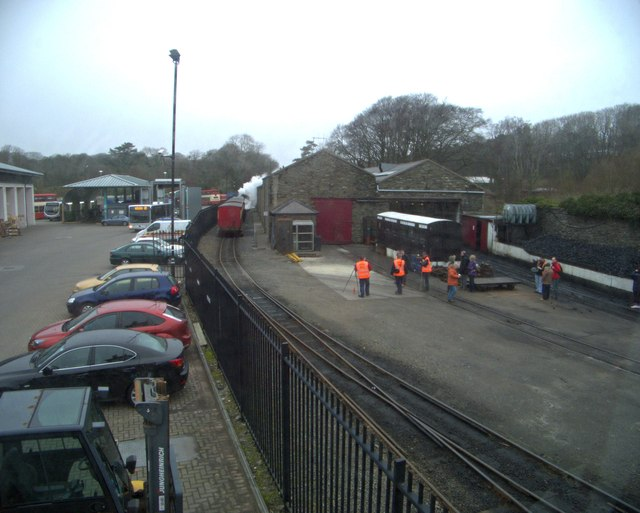
The current view from the relocated cabin looking along the running line towards the throat of the yard

=== Commission and use ===
Built in 1892 and located at the station throat between the carriage shed and the workshops. The Points Box, as it was called locally, contained a 36-lever frame signal box was built by Dutton & Co., of Worcester, and supplied to the railway when the yard was further modified and the workshops were extended. The frame is a unique survivor of the 'drink-handle' type in which the handle of the lever also serves as the catch handle. The 'box features a set of characteristic wooden external steps that must be climbed to access the levers, with storage space beneath the timber-built top section, this would have housed all the linkage and control gear.

=== Layout ===
The top section also features a three-quarter glazed section and integral fireplace, and bears a considerable resemblance to Dutton's signal boxes constructed for the Great Northern Railway (Ireland) about this time. From there the signalman on duty could command a view of the entire yard, controlling every traffic movement from passenger trains to complex shunting procedures. The one thing the signalman did not control was the staff and ticket single line safe-working, which in accordance with earlier practice remained the responsibility of the stationmaster. Douglas signal box lacked both telegraph and telephone when it was constructed, and it was not provided with a telephone until 1925 following an overrun accident in August of that year. Train to and from Peel and Castletown, and for shunting movements within the station were indicated to the signalman by a comprehensive whistle code.

=== Decommissioning ===
The 'box remained in use until the summer of 1970 when the point work of the Port Erin arrival platform and its associated signals were disconnected. These points were then controlled with hand levers and the signals were placed permanently in the 'off' position so that trains could arrive and depart without the box being staffed, saving the associated wage costs. Thereafter, it was used only for more complicated shunting movements in which case it would be staffed by a member of the train crew or the stationmaster. The remainder was taken out of use in 1979/80 when the old Port Erin Platforms – 5 & 6 – were removed and the area cleared for parking.

=== Relocation ===
Since that time the building has been relocated to make way for the new transport headquarters and Bus Vannin garages in 1998, moving forward from its original site at the same time as the 1893 carriage shed was demolished. Today it remains out of use but is occasionally open to the public as part of annual transport festivals hosted by the railway. During these events the box is tended to and staffed by members of the Isle of Man Steam Railway Supporters' Association a local voluntary organisation. The box housed a number of special train headboards, paraffin signal lamps, tri-colour torches and well as some ancillary locomotive parts, but these items been relocated to the Bothy in front of the works/locomotive shed to allow work to commence on an interior restoration of the signal box to something close to its 1960 condition.

=== Current signals ===
The original frame has been replaced by a small panel, initially in the stationmaster's office and now in the small hut at the foot of the platform, which controls the starter and home signals. The original was installed in 1983, and controlled the colour light home signal which guards the approach to the station from the south. In 2016 this was replaced by a new unit controlling two motor-worked semaphore platform starters, which, as permission to depart is given by the stationmaster, function more like the train ready "off" indicators seen on mainland railway stations indicating that station work is complete, and the train can depart when it receives the right away. The unit also controls colour light home signals some distance from the station, these were renewed in 2024.

== Other structures ==
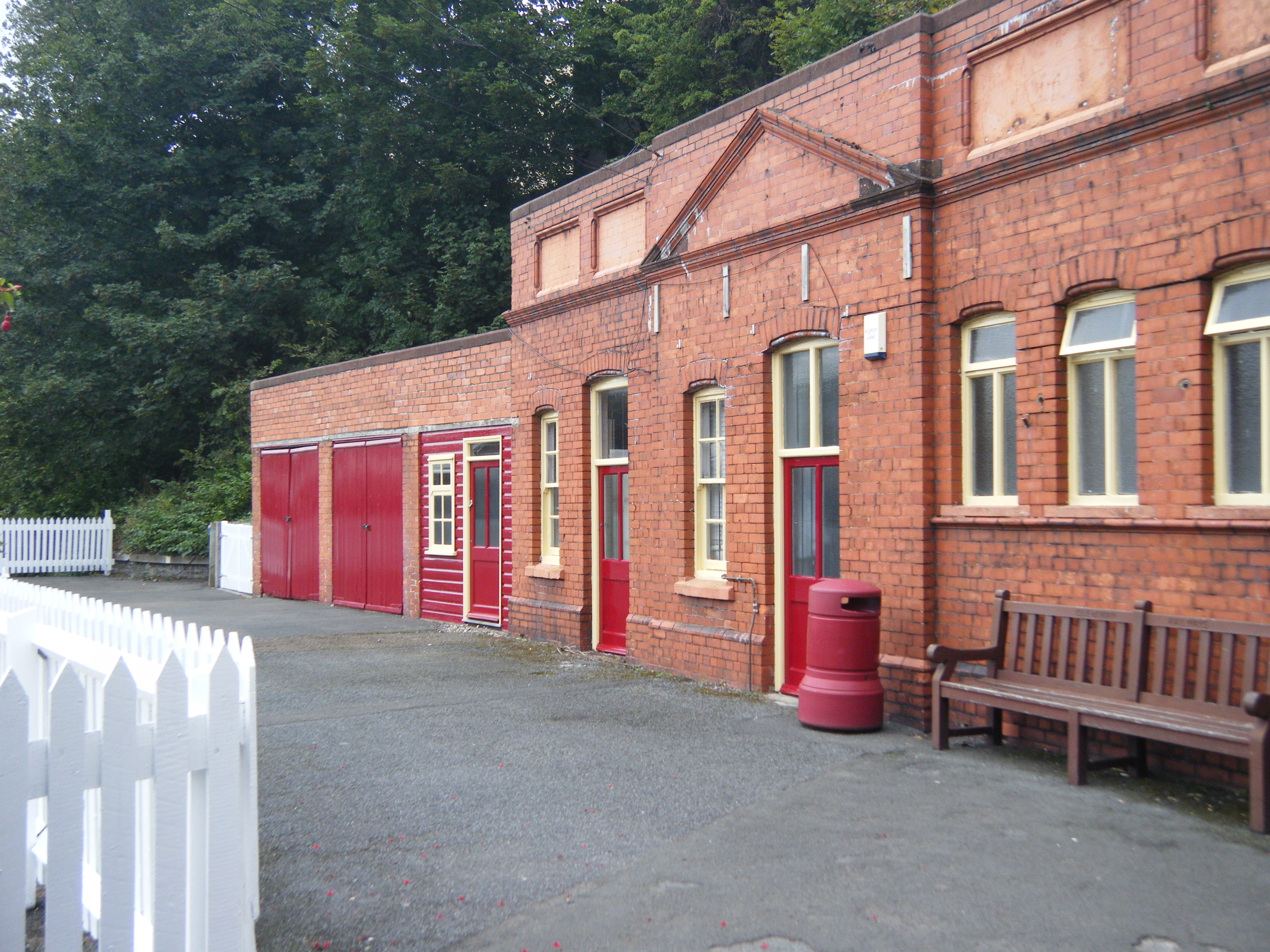
The old stable block, including toilets; the stables have now been converted into garages and former souvenir shop to the right which is now a preparation area for the railway's dining train service.

The smaller building that now houses the public and passenger toilet facilities and storage areas was once also used as the railway's own stabling facilities and incorporated porters' accommodation. In more recent times the stables have become garages which are leased out, there being three in total. The fourth old stable has been converted into accommodation and was once used by the night watchman and as storage space. The old porters' rooms were converted into the railway's souvenir shop in 1993 as part of the Year Of Railways and remained as such until the 1999 season when the premises closed and the space was let to the tenants of the station restaurant for storage purposes. When open the shop stocked a range of railway and transport-related publications, videos and magazines as well as a large range of postcards and souvenirs, which are now located at the Isle of Man Railway Museum in Port Erin. What now forms the ladies and gentlemen's' toilets next door was once entirely devoted to the gentlemans' facilities whilst the ladies waiting room was within the administrative structure. This setup was amended when rationalisation of the whole site was carried out in 1979 resulting in the facilities provided today. The toilets are also utilised by customers of the station restaurant and when closed are gated across. At the entrance to the platform there is a shall wooden chalet structure which is used by station staff when checking tickets, it also houses various signage and cleaning equipment. This structure was installed in 1991 replacing an earlier version which was time-expired; this structure was originally in a varnished finish but as part of minor refurbishments in 2009 was painted into the standard maroon and cream livery.

== Platforms ==
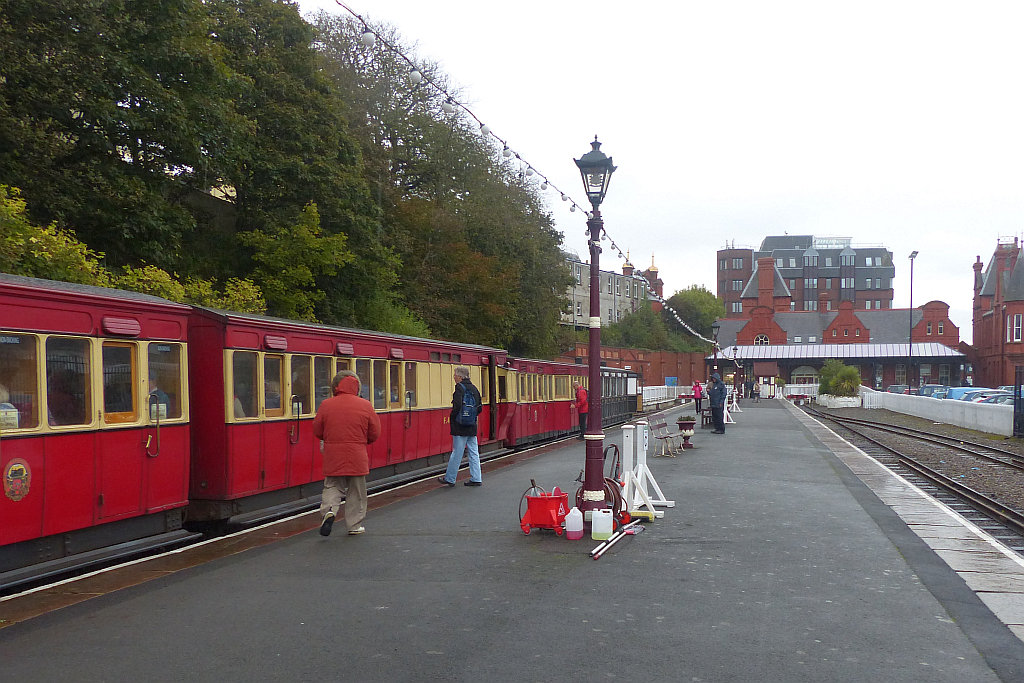
The former Peel and Ramsey line platforms which now serve the only remaining portion of the railway to the south of the island.

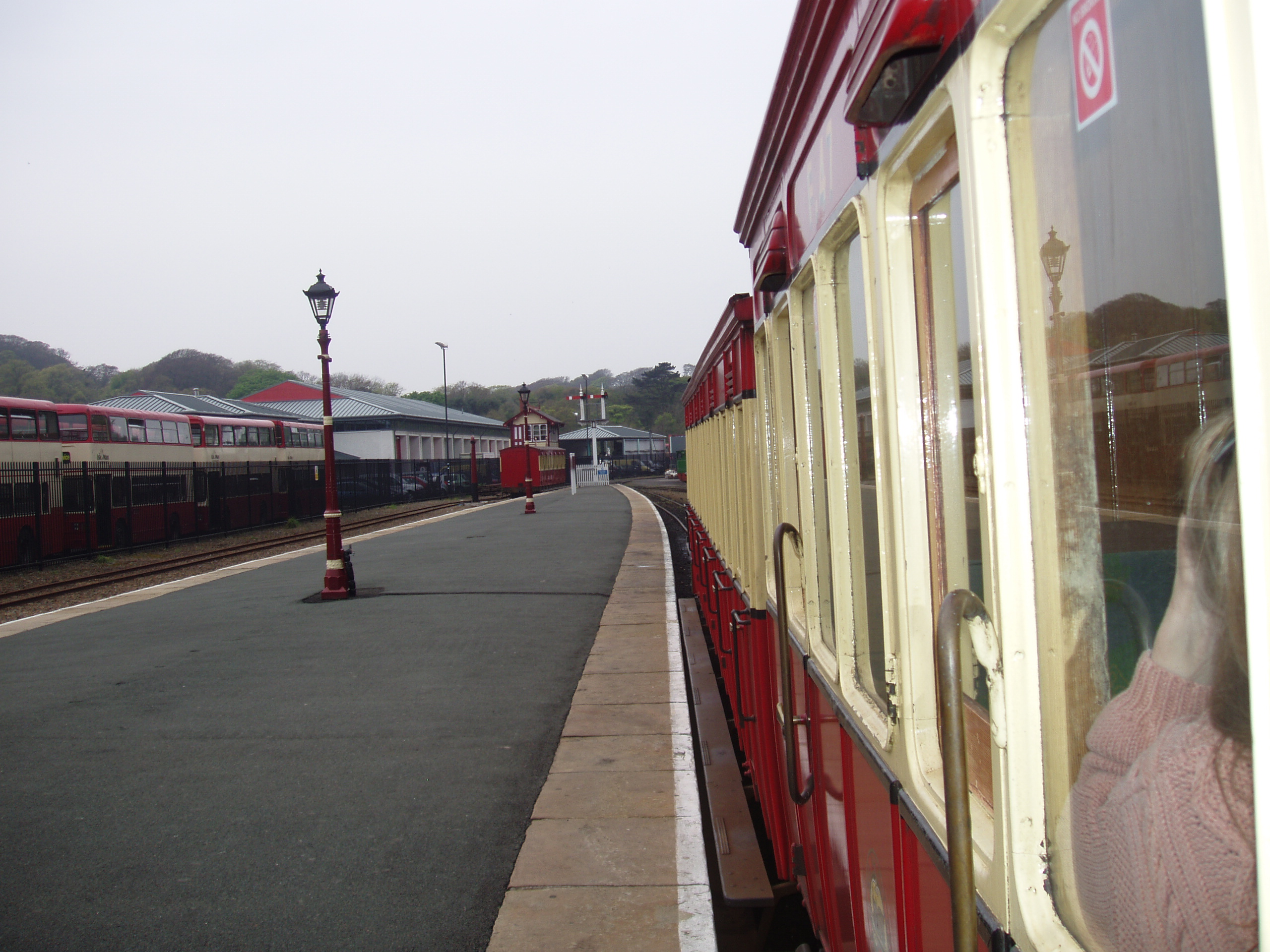
The remaining platform viewed from a train departing for Port Erin once used for all services to Peel and Ramsey.

The existing platform was one of two installed in 1892 replacing the 1873 originals which were on a slightly different alignment. Both the original platforms, and the 1892 replacements were half-height, but latter were raised to full height about 1904. It should be noted the platforms are not quite perpendicular to the alignment of the booking hall. In 1909 iron canopies were erected covering the circulating area west of the main station building and both platforms for the majority of their length. These suffered from corrosion in the secondary structural members latterly, and were demolished during the initial rationalisation of the site in 1979–80. At this time too the former Port Erin platforms were demolished to make way for a bus parking area. The Port Erin platforms were situated to the south of the surviving ones. The platforms had tar macadam surfacing with stone edging. The platform edges themselves were picked out with whitewash from 1940 onwards., Initially this was due to the blackout, but it was found to be so helpful that the custom has been maintained ever since. The platform is accessed by passengers via a gate at the station end installed in the early 1980s. For many years this was usually kept closed between trains, but at the present time, the gate is usually left open but with a sign saying "Platform Closed" placed in the entrance. During the railway's annual transport festivals the platforms are occasionally open to the public for limited periods. The platforms are currently unnumbered, but in former times the northern face was number 1 and 3, and the southern 2 and 4 to assist passengers and porters in finding the Peel and Ramsey portions of combined trains to and from these destinations. The end of the platform features two semaphore signals, installed in 2005 themselves replacing two colour light signals – mounted on the 1892 Dutton post of the former Peel starting signal – that replaced original semaphores in 1983. The 2005 replacements originate from the Festiniog Railway in Wales. The platform also features cast iron lamp standards installed in 1991 when the station was refurbished, going on to win an Ian Allan Heritage Award, returning the surviving platform to something close to its mid Edwardian state. Prior to 1909, the platforms featured similar lamp posts, though these were lit by gas rather than today's versions which are electrically lit. The sloped end of the platform was modified in more recent times so that one side now features a more gradual slope which leads to the signal box and workshop facilities by way of a concrete catwalk installed in 2001 for health and safety purposes, a further pathway being connected to the foot of the signal box steps.

== Sheds ==
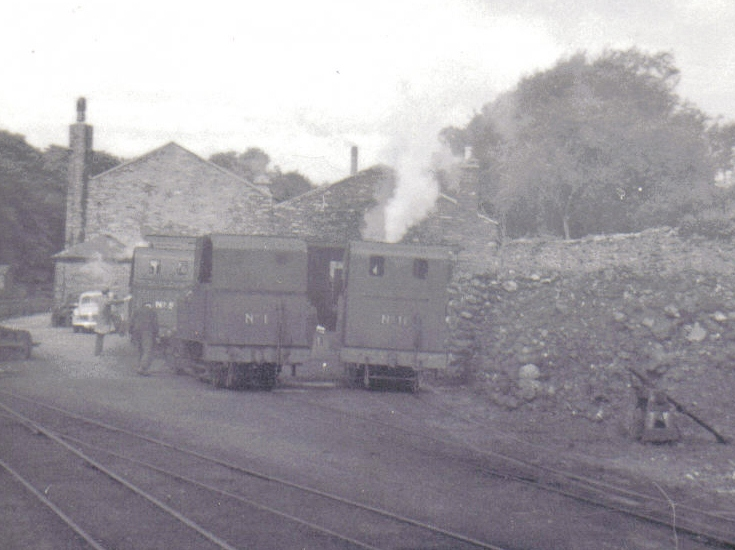
No.1 Sutherland, No.5 Mona and No.11 Maitland outside the running shed and workshop in the railway's heyday.

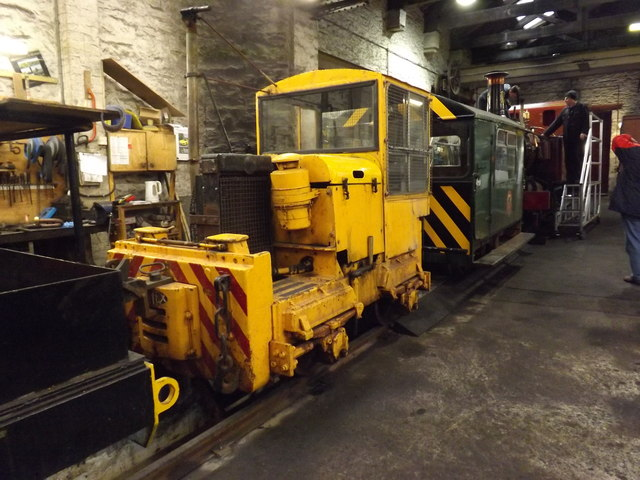
No.25 Sprout and People Carrier No.23 with No.13 Kissack at the rear in the workshops.

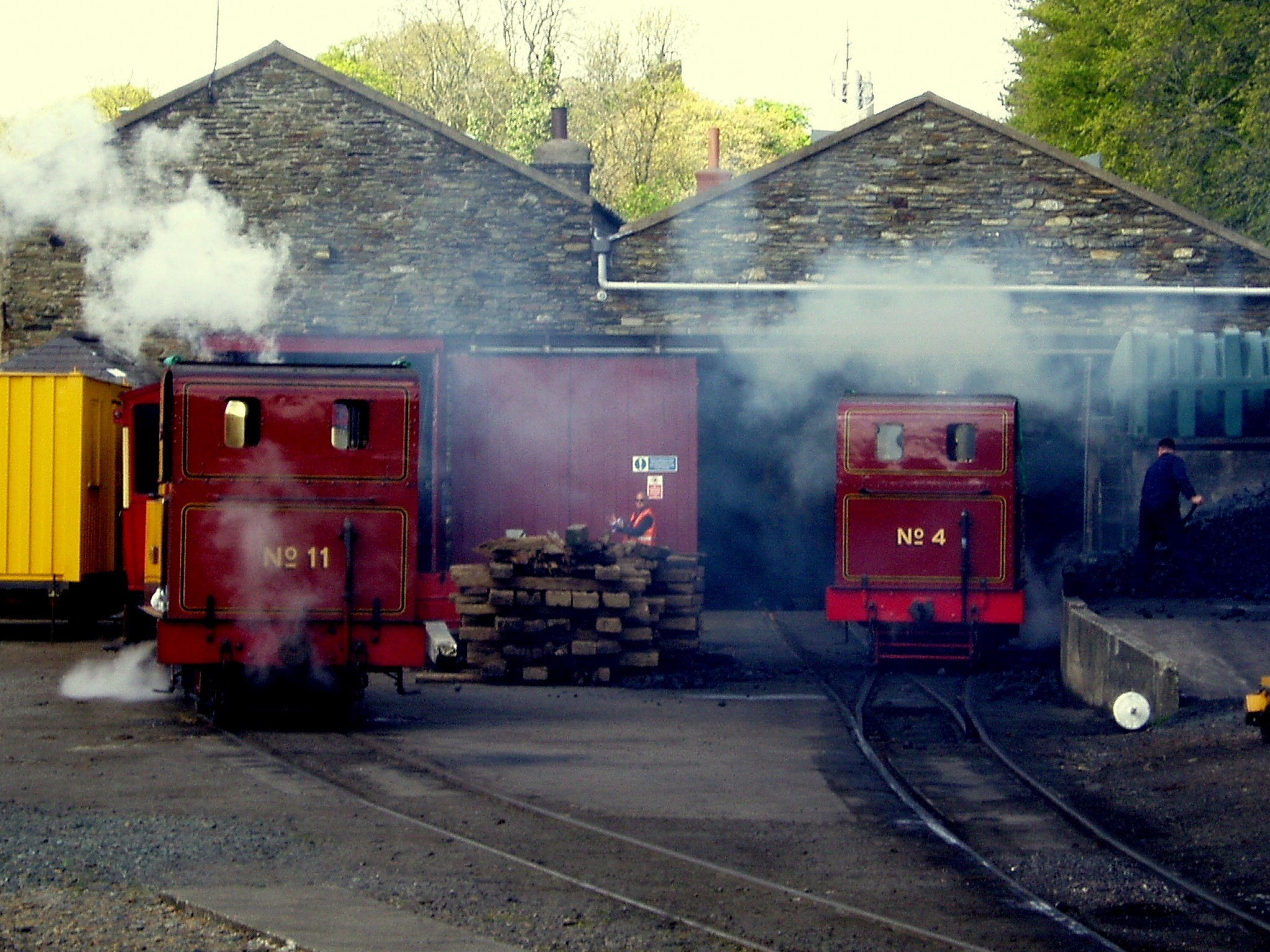
The locomotive shed (right) and workshops as they are today with No.11 Maitland and No.4 Loch outside.

=== Workshops and shed (1890) ===
Beyond the platforms stand the locomotive shed, machine shop, paint and carpenters' shops in two rubble stone buildings built in the 1890s. The locomotive shed is capable of holding up to 12 locomotives in addition to which the single road workshop can store up to five locomotives at any one time. This facility features overhead lifting gear which is capable of lifting locomotive boilers from the frames to carry out maintenance; there is also a static beam engine and wheel lathes located in this shed, which also houses the blacksmith and plant room to the rear, the former being converted from a stores area in 2001.

=== Carriage sheds (1893/1999) ===
Beyond the complex is the modern carriage shed which was erected in 1999, on the site of a coal yard capable of holding twelve carriages across two roads with single carriage-length maintenance pit. This replaced the 1893 original which was demolished to make way for the Bankc Circus development and bus depot adjacent, this held all seventy-five bogie carriages and stood to the rear of the signal box.

=== Joiners and paint sops (1893) ===
The buildings to the rear of the locomotive sheds house the carpenters'/jointers' shop and paint shop where all the in-house painting and signwriting was carried out by the railway's own staff as well as rebuild and maintenance of rolling stock, a purpose it still serves today though largely used by sub-contractors; it is separated into three individual areas, the latter of which also has external doors to access the new carriage shed.

=== Tankhouse (1893) ===
A smaller stone-built shed houses more storage facilities and atop this building are the two (now unused) water tanks for the shed complex which remain as a reminder of busier times; these were supplied by Ransom & Rapier. The side of the water tank base originally carried a large bracket signal governing entry into the station, but this was damaged and then removed c.1981. Staff toilet facilities are housed in an extension and the rear portion serves as permanent way storage.

=== Infill shed (1999) ===
What once formed a gap between the sheds (referred to as "the courtyard") was covered over in 1999 to provide further secure accommodation for rolling stock and this has been constructed from corrugated metal and is used to house some of the railway's redundant items of rolling stock including one of two Empress Vans and frames off out of use locomotives, it also provides covered rail access to the carpenters' and paint shops to the rear.

== Goods station ==
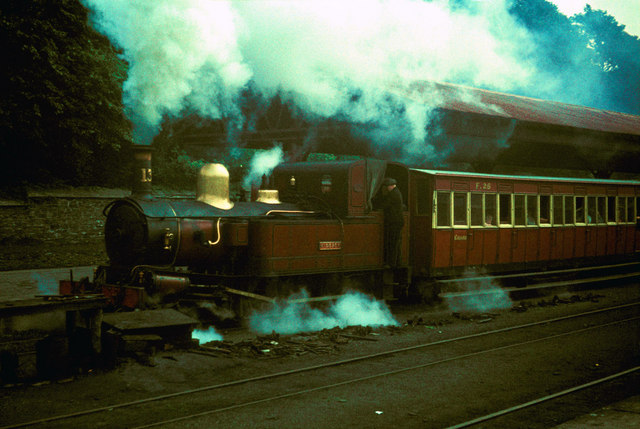
No.13 Kissack at the station in 1961; this locomotive remains part of the active service fleet.

The site of the present railway patrons' car park to the south of the station occupies the site of the Port Erin arrival and departure platforms, carriage sidings and the former goods yard – Roads 5 to 11 in the old station layout. Road 7 was used to store spare carriages to strengthen Port Erin line trains, whilst 8 to 11 formed the station's goods department. Reflecting the character of the island's freight traffic, there was a large goods shed, trans-shipment platform, and cattle dock, but no specialised facilities for handling coal traffic as relative little domestic coal was handled by the railway. There was also a sunken siding to load manure cleared from the streets of Douglas, and sold, by the railway to local farmers, especially in the Santon area, until the 1920s (Santon featured a dedicated manure siding for this purpose). This area was used to store redundant stock after the end of goods traffic in the 1960s and was partially lifted in 1975, until this time it was used to display locomotives and rolling stock. It was lifted in 1979 and the south line platforms with their canopies removed and turned into car parking.

== Rationalisation ==
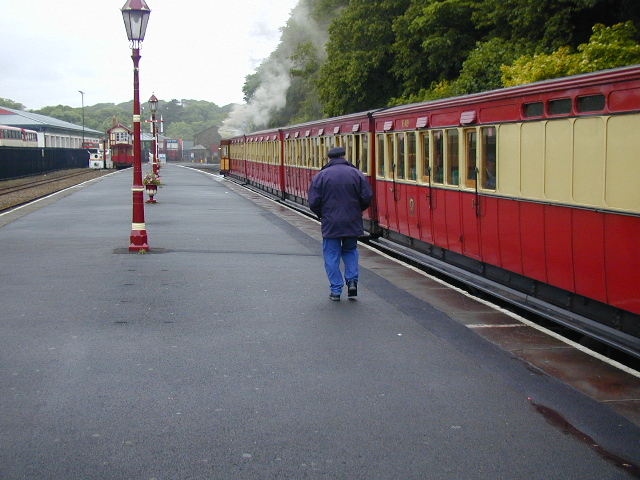
The remaining departure platform in 2007 viewed from a departing train, what remains of a once much larger terminal; the Banks Circus development, new transport headquarters, can see seen in the distance on the left.

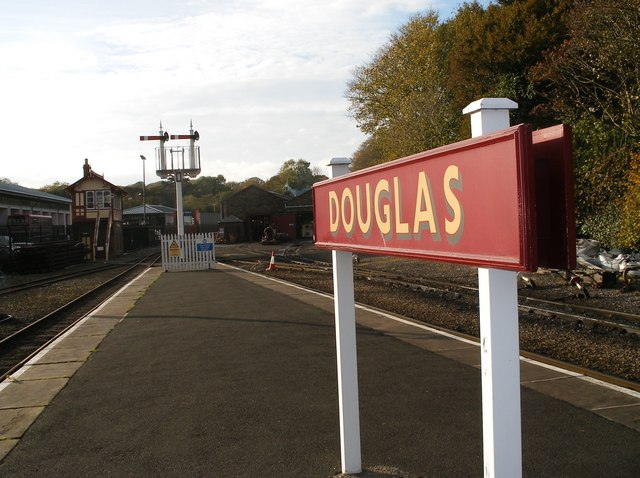
The end of the island platform with its double-sided running in board and starter signals, all that remains of the original yard, with workshops in the distance, prior to the major relay of the yard which commenced at the close of the 2023 operating season.

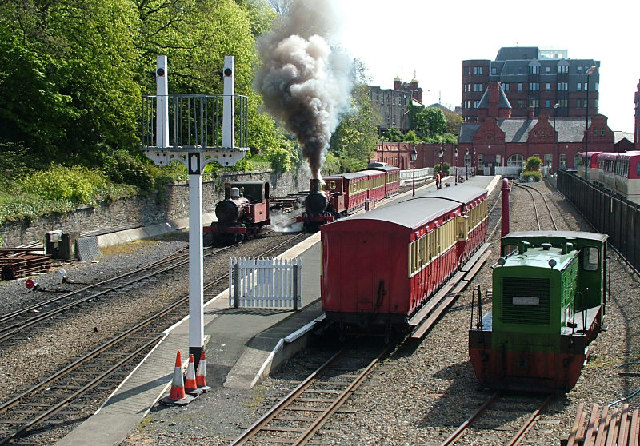
The site as it is today viewed from the signal box steps with No.17 Viking on the right, No.13 Kissack on test and No.12 Hutchinson at the platform.

=== Full layout ===
Until 1979, the station maintained its full layout and had two island platforms and full length canopies and a four road goods yard, controlled by the signal box provided by Dutton in 1892. Behind (south) of the signal box stood a four road carriage shed that had been built in 1893 to replace a smaller shed of 1875. The northern "Peel" island platform served trains to Peel and Ramsey, and was largely disused after 1968, except as a parking area. The inner and outer ends of the two Peel platform faces were separately numbered in an attempt to reduce the confusion caused by combining the Peel and Ramsey trains into a single working as far as St John's. The southern "Port Erin" island platform was numbered 5 (arrival) and 6 (departure.) It was usually used for South line trains, but trains to/from Peel and Ramsey could (and occasionally did) use it due to the existence of a crossover between the single tracks to Peel and Port Erin by the water tower which also gave access to the good yard.

=== 1979–1980 ===
The drastic rationalisation of the station started in early 1979 with the removal of the Peel platform canopy and most of that covering the Port Erin platform. The following winter saw the loss of the Port Erin platforms, the goods yard and the remaining platform canopies. Road 1 was modified to become a run round loop for the former Peel departure platform, and the access road to the engine shed was raised to form a platform face on to the new loop. The former course of the head shunt and Port Erin lines became part of the bus yard, creating a dirt road which divided the 1893 carriage shed and the signal box from the running line. At the same time, the Port Erin line was slewed northwards to connect with the stump of the former Peel line, and a new connection made to the carriage shed from the mainline facing trains approaching from Port Erin. The revised layout was re-signalled in 1983 with movements within the station being protected by a colour light home signal located approximately halfway between the new carriage shed and Nunnery bridge. The semaphore starters at the end of platforms 1 and 3 were replaced by a pair of colour light signals mounted on the post of the old Peel line starting signal.

=== 1998–1999 ===
The 1893 carriage shed was demolished and replaced with a new shed on the opposite side of the line beyond the old paint shop to allow for the creation of a new bus maintenance facility and administrative building called Bank's Circus. Road 5 – the former Port Erin arrival line, which had been used for carriage storage since 1979, was removed to enlarge the car park, and was replaced with "Road 0" which is used for the storage of maintenance equipment such as ballast wagons, and flat wagons. This was on the site of the former road access to the works, and the 1980 platform on that site was removed. The familiar landmark of the grounded carriage body in front of the works, which acted as a bothy and an oil store was removed in 1999, but returned in July 2013 and has since been partly restored and painted into Manx Northern Railway livery as No.2 (later renumbered F41, then N41 by the IMR).

=== 2023–2024 ===
Work commenced in late 2023 to relay the rails in the yard whilst largely retaining the layout but including a new crossing to access the coaling stage; work is ongoing as at May 2024.

== Site ==
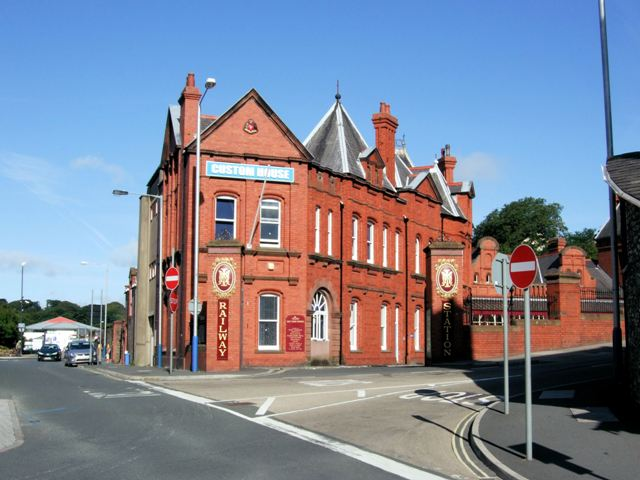
The approach road to the site viewed from the North Quay showing the lower entrance and former administration block.

The station is sited on an area known as Lake Road (although technically this was lost during the more recent developments), so-called because the area was, until the arrival of the railway, swampland that was reclaimed to build the station other developments. The river now runs along the southerly side of the site. Where now stands the chain store was once a large timber yard operated for many years by Quiggin & Co., and this backed onto the railway's property. What now forms both car and bus parking areas was once the railway's large goods yard, and there was also another island platform which was removed in 1979 to make way for bus storage area. Further up the yard towards its mouth are the sheds which are original. At the approach to the station is the junction of Bank Hill which runs alongside the station perimeter wall, now an office development dominates this site but it was until 1988 home to one of the island's smaller breweries. In recent times the north quay the adjoins the site has been partially pedestrianised and now has a number of restaurants and public houses as well as a selection of shops and boutiques. The large red brick office block that sits behind the station was erected in 1988 on the site of the former Clinch's Brewery, the tower of which was retained in the new development. The site is in the central part of the island's capital close to the financial district making it ideally suited for the commuter train services which since 2007 have been provided annually during the T.T. race period. Its location at the end of the inner harbour was ideal in the past when the railway carried cargo directly from ships that berthed nearby.

== Catering ==
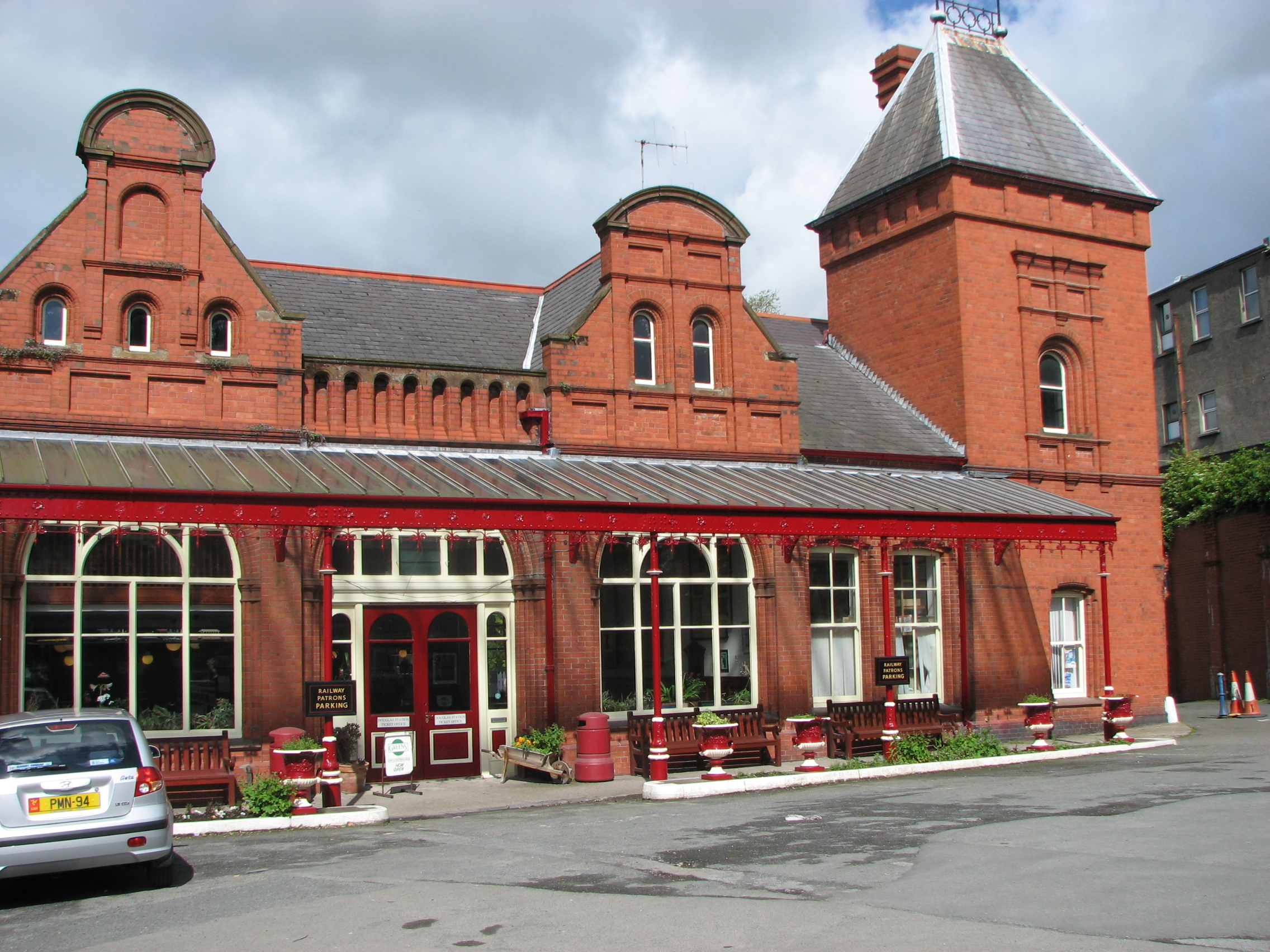
The Tickethall which occupies the former booking hall and station masters' office viewed from the frontage; this area was home to Greens vegetarian restaurant between 1990 and 2009.

In the past the railway boasted its own tea rooms and bar, located in the ground floor of the administrative block which stands next to the station building itself. This building now houses the island's Custom House and no longer houses any railway staff. In later years following the nationalisation of the railway a basic cafe was provided in the booking hall and this was also home to the station shop which was operated by the volunteers of the Isle of Man Steam Railway Supporters' Association. When the interior of the booking hall was extensively redeveloped in 1991 (for which it won a prestigious Ian Allan Heritage Award for best preserved station in the British Isles) a mezzanine floor was added and a catering establishment known as Greens took up residence; this enterprise quickly establishing itself as the island's only dedicated vegetarian restaurant. In December 2010 it was announced that there would be new tenants be taking over the facility and by January 2011 it was announced that the facility was to rebranded as The Tickethall and following basic refurbishment it was opened that month. The new premises similarly cater for the vegetarian market at the same time as offering a number of fish dishes and breakfast items. They also work in conjunction with the railway's regular special events providing the catering for many of these throughout the year. The company that runs the facility also operates a similar restaurant and grill in the upper part of the town known as The Mailbox which is located in the former premises of the Isle of Man Post Office.

== Redevelopments ==
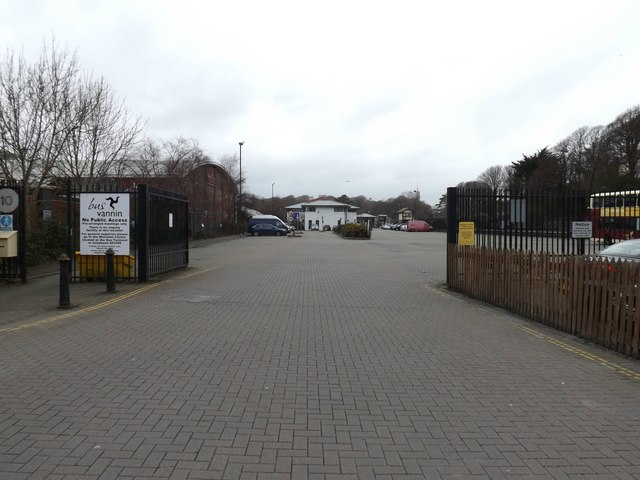
The approach road and gates accessing Banks Circus on the site of the former goods yard of the station; the remaining station is on the right.

The entire area has redeveloped in more recent times, and the "Banks Circus" headquarters were established here in 1999 providing the island's central bus garage and yard. A new carriage shed was also constructed at this time further up the yar and the signal box was relocated. The majority of the former goods yard is now given over to a Tesco store, which also utilised the reclaimed timber yard site which also boasted its own internal railway, Quiggin's Tramway, at one time. In August 2014, controversial plans were announced that would significantly alter the Booking Hall by removing the present kitchen and mezzanine, one of the original 19th century ticket hatches, and creating a two-story structure within the shell of the present building accommodating a restaurant, retail unit, and toilets. Railway and passenger facilities would be further reduced with the published plans showing only a small office being retained within the station building for the sale of tickets. Significantly, the plan eliminates any waiting area for passengers which is not a retail or food service area, and absorbs most of the circulating area as an outdoor seating area for the restaurant severely restricting movement to and from the platforms.

== Routes ==
| Preceding station | Isle of Man Railway | Following station |
|---|---|---|
| Port Soderick | Port Erin Line (Open) | Terminus |
| Quarter Bridge | Peel Line (Closed) | Terminus |
| Quarter Bridge | Ramsey Line (Closed) | Terminus |

== See also ==
- Isle of Man Railway stations
- Isle of Man Steam Railway Supporters' Association
