= Port Soderick railway station =

Railway station in Isle of Man, the UK

Port Soderick Railway Station Stashoon Raad-Yiarn Phurt Soderick
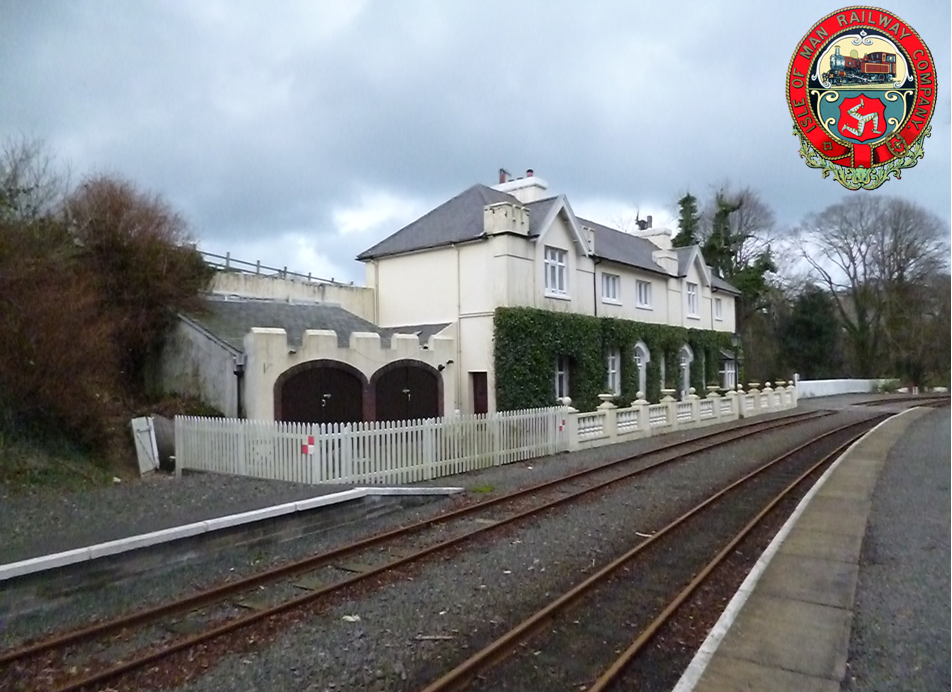

General information
- Location: Off Santon Road, Braddan, Isle of Man, IM2 4FK.
- Coordinates: 54.126°N 4.537°W
- System: The Isle of Man Railway Co., Ltd.
- Owner: Isle of Man Government; Department of Infrastructure
- Lines: Port Erin Line; Between Douglas & Port Erin
- Platforms: Two Raised
- Tracks: Two Running Lines; Long Passing Loop

History
- Opened: 1 August 1874
- Closed: Seasonally Since 1965
- Rebuilt: 1898 - Station Building Erected; 1981 - Platform Hut Built; 2002 - Down Platform Added; 2003 - Waiting Shelters Erected; 2005 - Replacement Staff Hut

Passengers
- Passenger Only

Services
Waiting Shelter
Location

Port Soderick Railway Station (Manx: Stashoon Raad Yiarn Phurt Soderick) is the first station on the Port Erin line of the Isle of Man Railway and is located near the settlement of the same name on the Isle of Man. It forms part of the sole remaining section of the railway which once served a 46-mile network across the island. The station was built primarily to serve the popular coastal resort which is a short walk from the station via one of the Manx National Glens. Although largely derelict today, this resort was once a hugely popular destination for tourists

== Access & Locale ==
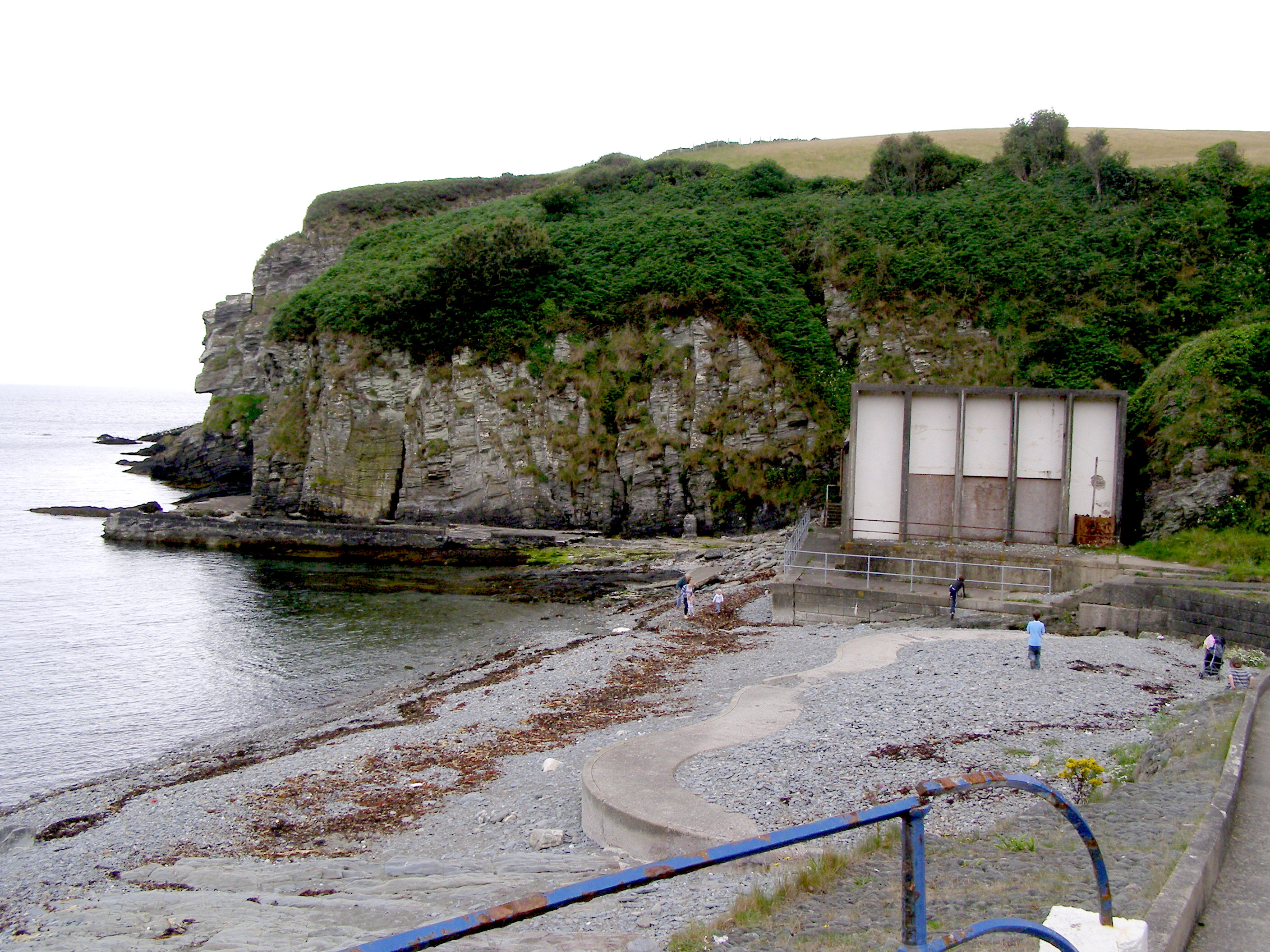
The former amusement arcade, now home to Heroes On The Water.

The B23 road between Douglas and the village provides vehicular access to the station and passes through a tunnel underneath the line after which the station driveway is directly to the left of the road. To the eastern end of the station the railway passes over the main road by means of a large stone bridge; at the southerly end the line passes into Crogga Woods from where can be seen the large house and miniature railway. The glen of the same name leads from the station to the former beach resort, operational until the early 1990s and now largely demolished, though the former amusement arcade remains.

== Development ==
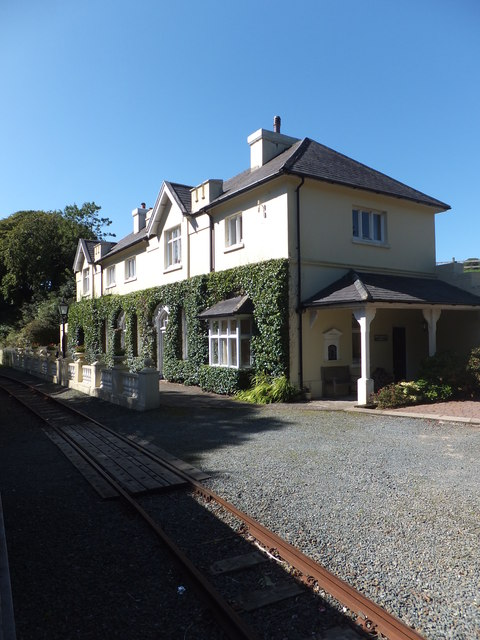
Station House

The station was originally provided with a basic wooden building but by 1898 it had become clear that the popularity of the nearby resort demanded a more substantial building; to this end, the current grandiose station was erected and included station masters' residence, refreshment rooms and booking facilities; the latter has been retained as part of the private house but only as a feature and the station is no longer staffed. The station building is still extant but in private ownership, having been converted from a derelict state in the 1980s. The station remains open but unstaffed; there are two wooden shelters on the platforms. A further small hut stood at the easterly end of the station to provide accommodation for station staff at the rare times when the station is used for passing of trains until it was destroyed in a storm in 2012.

Previous owners included Alex Lloyd (racing driver). It is an imposing large structure, more latterly replaced by two wooden shelters on each platform. The "down" platform was added in 2002 when much of the railway was re-laid as part of the I.R.I.S. Scheme, and all-island integrated sewage scheme. Two platform shelters, formerly used by Bus Vannin were also installed at this time and a replacement accommodation unit for staff, though the latter was later destroyed by a fallen tree and has not been replaced; it stood at the northern end of the station beside the remaining windlass which operates one of two semaphore signals.

== Other Transport ==
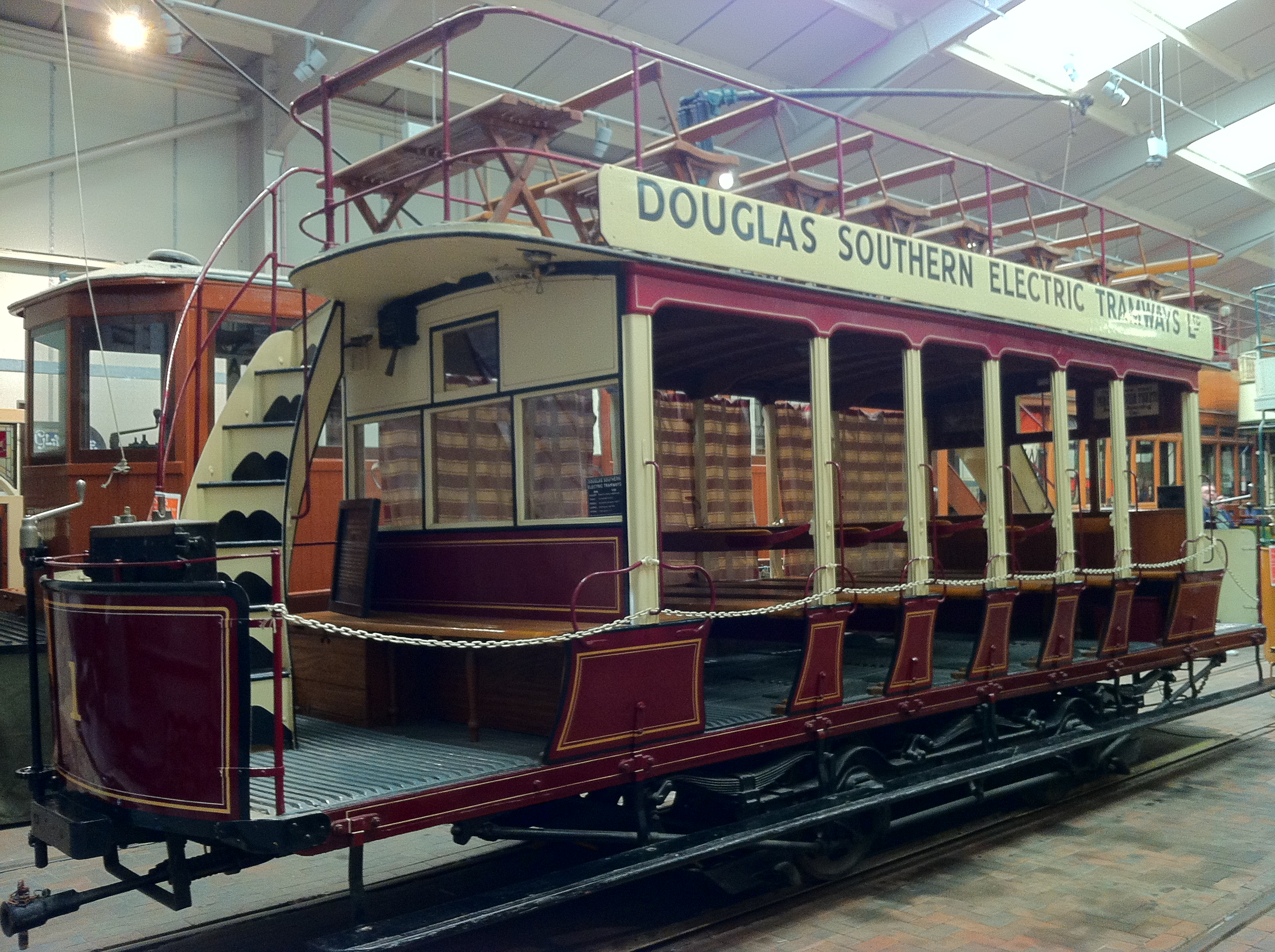
Sole surviving tramcar No.1 which was rescued in 1955 after the closure of the tramway in 1939 and restored; it is now resident at the National Tramway Museum situated in Crich and is in operational condition. The line also had unpowered trailers of similar design.

=== Douglas Souther Electric Tramway ===
The resort was also once served by the Douglas Head Marine Drive and Electric Tramway which took a spectacular coastal route from Douglas Head to a point above the beach; this tramway was established in 1896 and closed in 1939 upon the outbreak of war. A landslide on part of the route saw that it never opened again although the route was modified and operated by omnibuses for a number of years. The depot remained in situ after closure and shortly prior to its demolition one tramcar was rescued and taken off-island preservation, all other stock was destroyed on site.

=== Road & Sea ===
Owing to the popularity of the venue it was also served by a variety ferry boats from Douglas harbour as well as charabancs and of course the railway itself. So popular was the seaside resort that the station boasted the only full-height platform at an intermediate station on the south line other than Port St. Mary which. Later it was served regularly by the motor buses of Douglas Corporation Transport which used a re-opened and repaired Marine Drive along the route of the former tramway, it enjoyed something of a renaissance during the 1960s but later fell into disrepair.

== Improvements ==
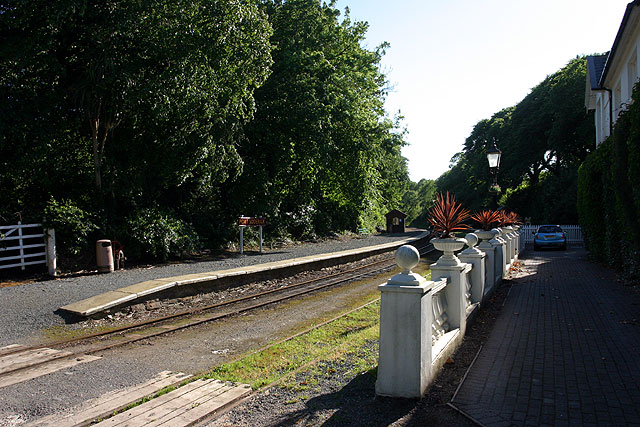
Down Platform

In 2002 all stations received platforms, and the little used passing loop at this station received another (seldom used) full-height platform on the "down" side, together with waiting shelter, indicative of the management policy to provide passenger facilities at each station, seemingly regardless of how well patronised the stations were. For the start of the 2008 season the station was adorned with new bi-lingual station nameboards; differing from all other stations on the line insofar as one side (the "up" platform) has the name in English, and the other (the "down" platform, which is rarely used) is in Manx, stating "Purt" as opposed to "Port"; the nameboards feature a yellowy-cream lettering with black shadowing on a maroon coloured back board, the now-standard livery of station nameboards on the line.

== Crogga Valley Railway ==
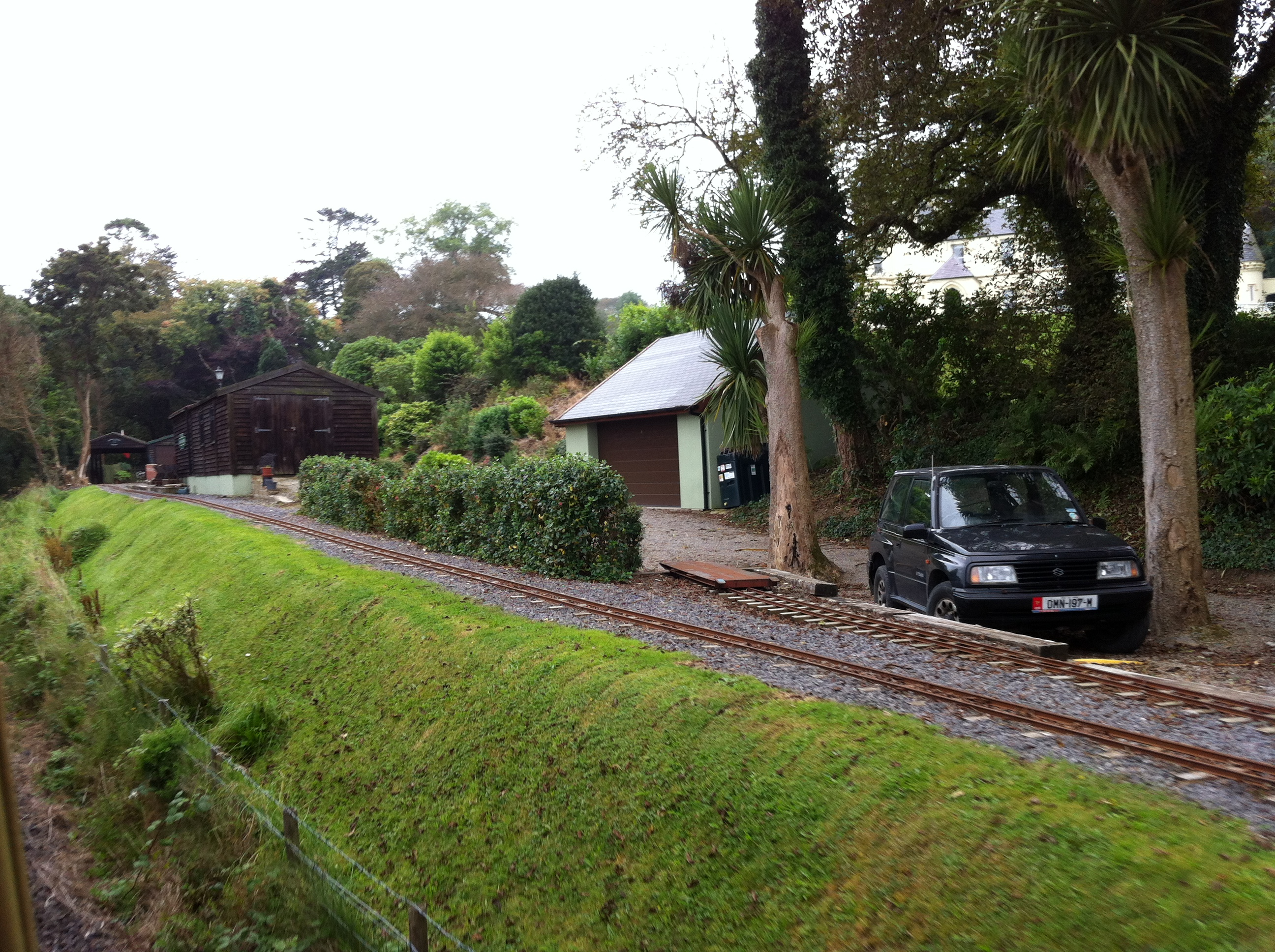
The miniature line from a passing train looking landward.

To the south of the station is a 7¼-inch gauge miniature railway which is visible from the land side of passing trains. The railway, that runs around the grounds of the house of the same name, is not open to the public. It was established by a previous owner of the house and has been expanded in recent times to travel around the edge of a man-made lake in the grounds, with turntables fitted for locomotives, workshops, sheds, a mock-up signal box and a fabricated "tunnel" through which trains pass which was made by burying a modified shipping container. In the past a variety of both steam and diesel locomotives including miniature Santa Fe and Canadian Pacific and a Beyer-Garratt known as King Crogga. have worked the line, which is occasionally open to the public for charitable fundraising purposes. Since the last owner put the property on the market the railway has been closed and its future will be determined by the next occupant of the property. Parts of the railway were relocated from a house in the north of the island when the owner first moved to the house.

== Incident ==
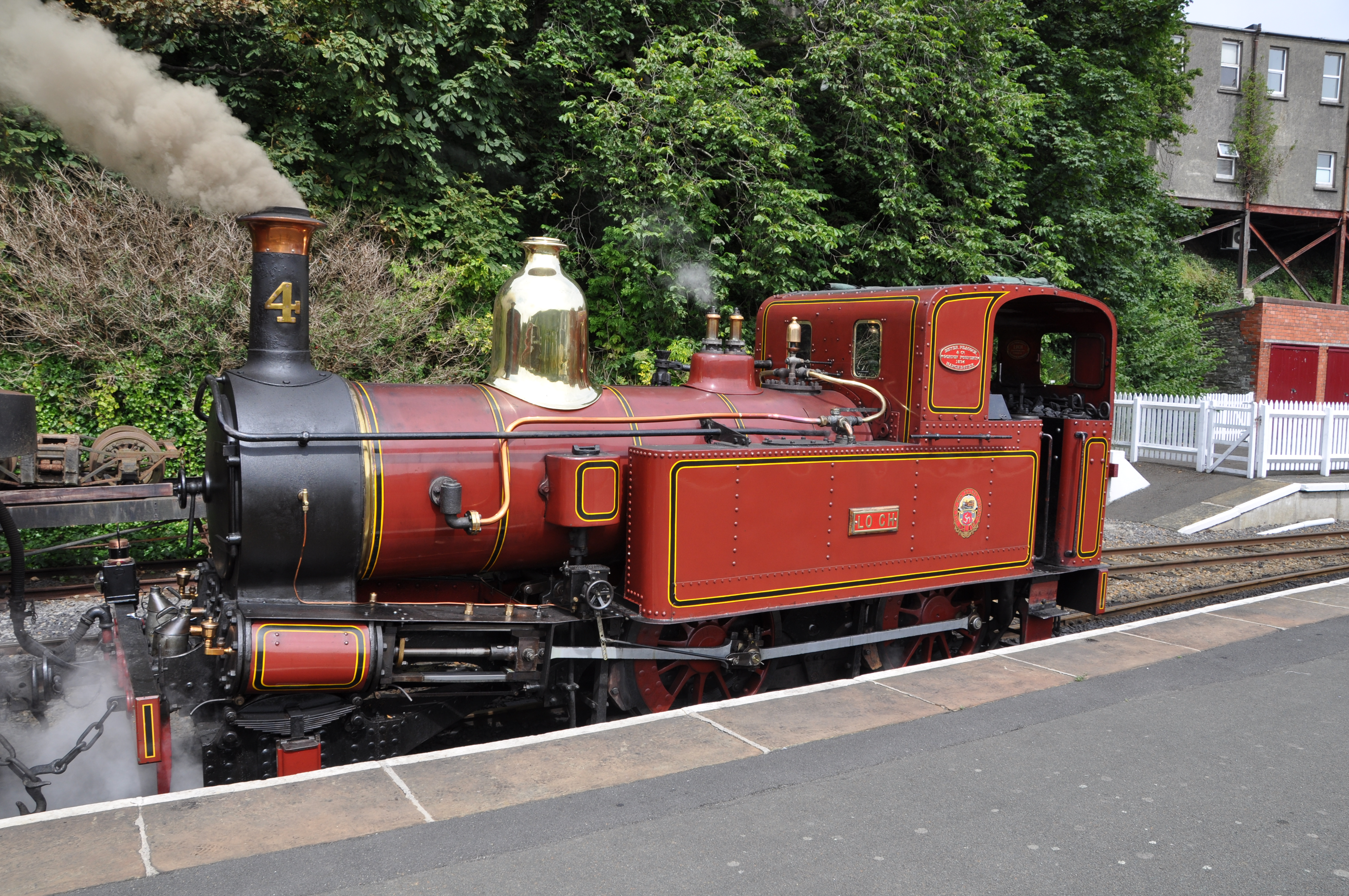
No.4 Loch

On 19 May 2008 there was an incident at the station involving a van and oncoming train which resulted in a collision of the two. The matter was widely reported in the media but as the train was travelling no faster than five miles per hour (as per the rule book within station limits) and no injuries were sustained.

There was however much damage to the Vauxhall van and remedial damage to the wooden buffer beam of the 1874-built locomotive No.4 Loch which was involved. Local emergency services attended but train operations were continued later in the same day; a health and safety report has since been commissioned into the incident.

== Route ==
Preceding station	Isle of Man Railway	Following station
Santon	Port Erin Line	Douglas

== See also ==
- Isle of Man Railway stations
