= Connaught Type D =

British sports car

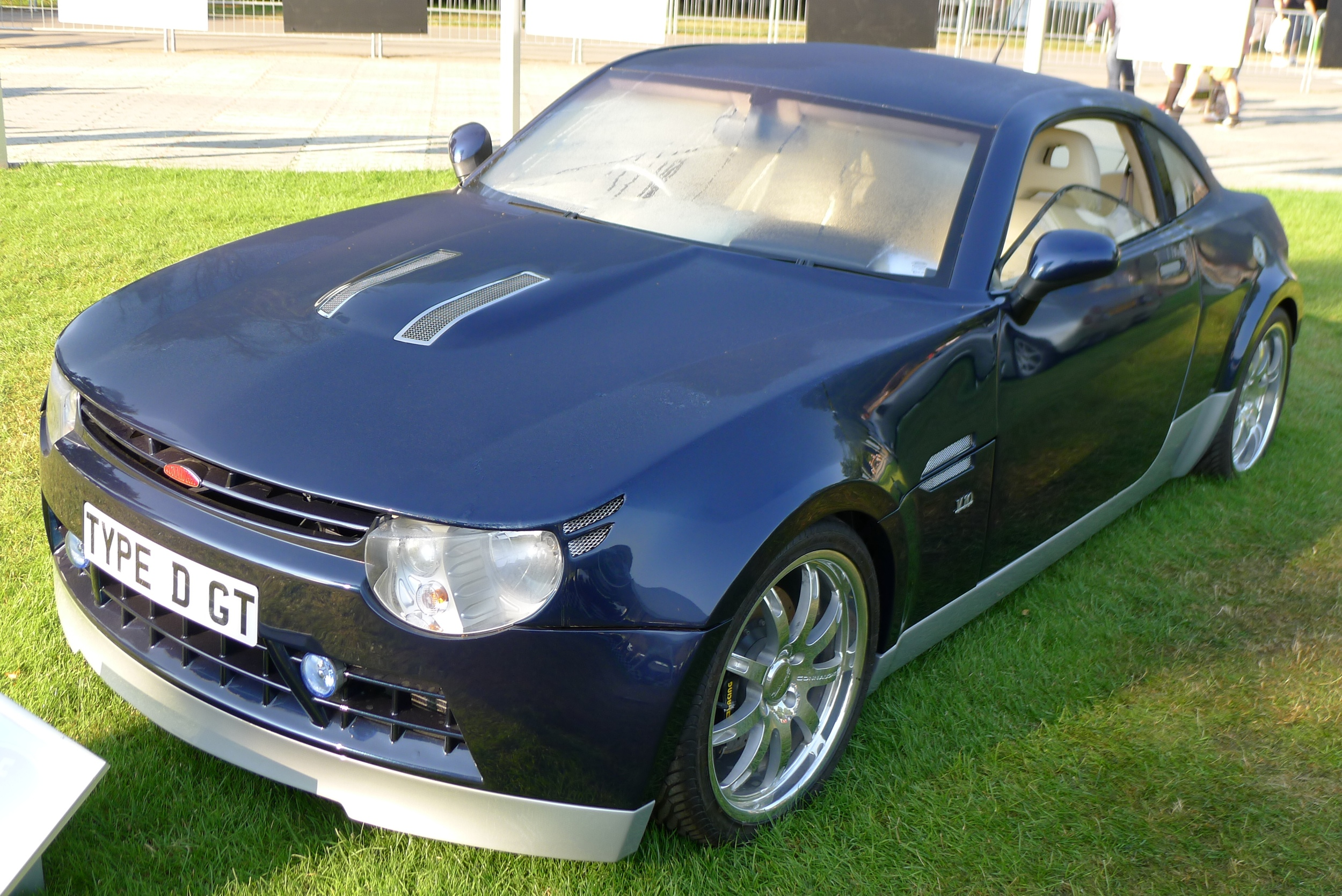
- Constructor: Connaught
- Production: 2006–2007 (5 prototype vehicles built)

Technical specifications
- Chassis: Steel-reinforced tubular space frame covered in aluminum body panels
- Suspension: Double wishbones, adjustable coil springs over shock absorbers, anti-roll bar
- Length: 4,251 mm (167.4 in)
- Width: 1,855 mm (73.0 in)
- Height: 1,361 mm (53.6 in)
- Axle track: Front: 1,595 mm (62.8 in); Rear: 1,635 mm (64.4 in)
- Wheelbase: 2,840 mm (112 in)
- Engine: 2.0 L (120 cu in) 22.5° V10, DOHC, four-valves per cylinder, supercharged front-mid longitudinally-mounted
- Torque: 274 lb⋅ft (371 N⋅m)
- Transmission: Mitchell Cotts 5-speed manual limited-slip differential
- Power: 296 bhp (221 kW; 300 PS)
- Weight: 950 kg (2,090 lb)

Competition history

The Connaught Type D is a series of prototype sports cars, designed, developed, and built by British manufacturer Connaught Motor Company, between 2006 and 2007.

== Overview ==
The Type D was first revealed in concept renderings on 3 September 2004 at the Goodwood Revival, with the first real images shown on 3 June 2005 ahead of a planned 2006 launch. A limited production run of 300 vehicles was planned, including 100 Syracuse Edition units to commemorate the 50th anniversary of the Connaught Type B's win at the 1955 Syracuse Grand Prix, the first international grand prix won by a British car since World War 2. The car was engineered by former Jaguar engineers Tim Bishop and Tony Martindale, styling done by Coventry University, and manufacturing outsourced to EPM Technology based in Derby.

It is a 2-door 2+2-seater with a chassis consisting of a steel tubeframe along with a Twintex (intermingled fiberglass-polypropylene composite) inner tub and hand-formed aluminium body panels, with a target dry weight of 750 kg (1,650 lb) for the base model. Kerb weight was eventually revealed to be 950 kg (2,090 lb). A convertible version named Eclipse was initially planned, equipped with a power hardtop convertible system. It uses a V10 hybrid engine mounted longitudinally and placed in a front-mid layout driving the rear wheels. It uses all-cast aluminium double wishbone suspension on all four wheels. Connaught claims the Type D is designed to receive a 5 star score in Euro NCAP crash testing. It was initially suggested that the Type D would be priced around £35,000.

== Powertrain ==
The Type D was originally said to use a unique all-aluminium 2.11-litre naturally-aspirated narrow-angle V10 engine with a narrow bank angle of 22.5 degrees. The narrow angle allows the engine's two banks to both share the same single cylinder head, like Volkswagen's VR6 engines and Lancia's narrow-angle V4 engines. It had a compression ratio of 13.5:1, individual throttle bodies for each cylinder, and used a single overhead cam with two valves per cylinder and variable valve timing.

The V10 was then augmented by a 48-volt electric motor hybrid system using a Lynch electric motor mounted to the crankshaft and a battery and a capacitor buffer system, for additional torque and allow the Connaught Type-D GT to achieve high fuel economy. Power was then routed through a proprietary five-speed manual gearbox supplied by Mitchell Cotts and an optional limited-slip differential, with a potential optional six-speed sequential transmission in the future.

Connaught claimed that the combined power output of this initial version is 162 bhp (121 kW; 164 PS) at 6,000 rpm, while combined peak torque is 144 lb⋅ft (195 N⋅m) from 1,000–6,000 rpm thanks to torque fill provided by the electric motor; the engine alone makes a peak torque of 144 lb⋅ft (195 N⋅m) at 4,000 rpm. Connaught claimed a 0–60 mph (97 km/h) acceleration time of 6.2 seconds, a top speed of 140 mph (230 km/h), and fuel consumption of 42 mpg_{‑imp} (6.7 L/100 km; 35 mpg_{‑US}). The engine is designed to pass Euro IV emissions standards with features such as engine start-stop, head-only coolant loop, and catalyst heaters, which along with the hybrid system achieves a claimed 150 g/km of CO2 emissions.

Later, the engine specifications were changed to add supercharging, the displacement was revised down to 2.0-litres with a bore and stroke of 62.5 mm × 65.1 mm (2.46 in × 2.56 in), dual overhead cams with four valves per cylinder, and the addition of cylinder deactivation. As a result, output claims rose to 300 PS (221 kW; 296 hp) at 7,000 rpm and 274 lb⋅ft (371 N⋅m) at 3,300 rpm, with a top speed of 170 mph (270 km/h) and claimed 0–60 mph (97 km/h) and 0–100 km/h (62 mph) acceleration times of 4.3 and 4.5 seconds, respectively.

== Production ==
Four fully assembled vehicles were made, with an additional 20 partially built units created and at least 24 V10 engines produced.
