= Wooler (motorcycles) =

- Founded: 1911
- Founder: John Wooler
- Products: Motorcycles, Cyclecars

Wooler was a British manufacturer of motorcycles and automobiles, founded by engineer John Wooler in 1911 based in Alperton, Middlesex. The company became known for its unconventional designs which included several fore-and-aft twins, a vertical camshaft single cylinder machine, a transverse-four beam engine, and a transverse flat four. Most machines possessed Wooler's enduring design features of a petrol tank which extended past the steering head.

In 1919-1920 the Wooler Mule cyclecar was manufactured until the company was reformed.

== History ==
=== Motorcycles ===
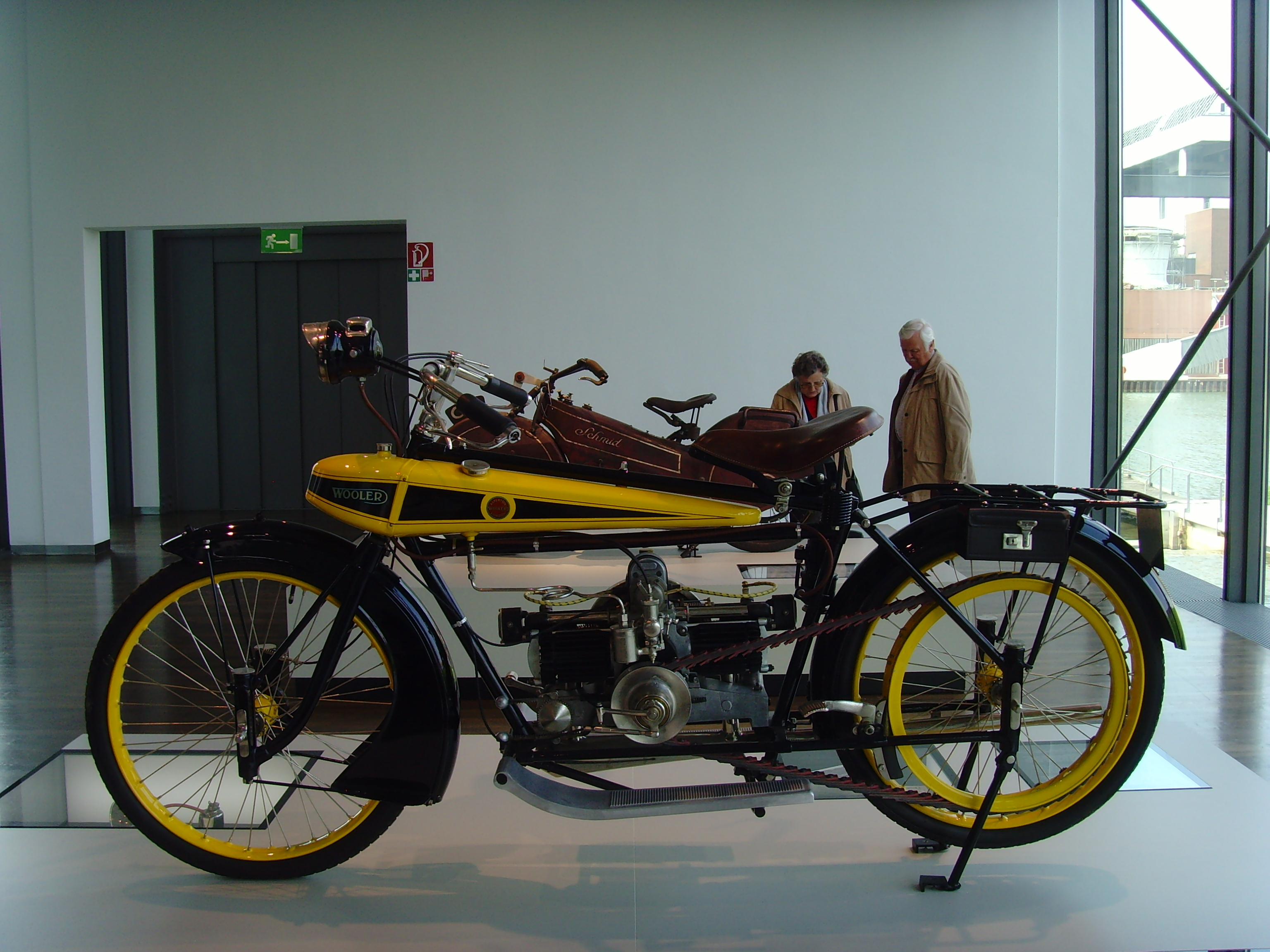
Wooler Model B

John Wooler designed his first motorcycle in 1909 – a two-stroke horizontal single-cylinder machine with a double-ended piston. The first production model was a 230 cc two-stroke with front and rear plunger spring suspension and a patent "anti-vibratory" frame. The motorbike was manufactured by Wilkinson from 1912 onwards with a 344 cc engine and marketed as the Wilkinson-Wooler. Production was halted during WWI, and a receiver was appointed for the company in 1915, but the company's munitions contracts with the Royal Air Force allowed it to survive the war years.

Motorcycle production resumed in 1919 with a new and advanced machine which was entered in the 1921 Junior TT where it was nicknamed the "Flying Banana" by Graham Walker.

=== Automobiles ===
The Wooler Mule cyclecar was announced in February 1919. It was powered by a 1022 cc air-cooled twin with the cylinders protruding from the sides of the bonnet, and a circular dummy radiator. The engine used rotary valves. It had a double rear wheel giving the impression of a three-wheeler. No prices were published, but contemporary press reports suggested a price of around £130 which had increased to £185 by December. Only a few prototypes were built.

In 1920 the company was reformed as The Wooler Motor Cycle Company (1919) Ltd. and the Mule ceased production.

=== 1920s motorcycles ===
In 1920 the company was reformed as The Wooler Motor Cycle Company (1919) Ltd. In 1930 the Great Depression caused the company's closure.

=== Post WW2 motorcycles ===
Wooler returned in 1945 with a prototype 500 cc transverse four shaft drive with an unusual beam type engine with the cylinders set one above the other like the Brough Superior Golden Dream. It was displayed at the Earls Court show in 1948 and again in 1951. It never ran properly and in 1954 Wooler returned to Earls Court with a completely different transverse flat four, still air-cooled with shaft drive. No more than five are thought to have been built before the company ceased motorcycle production in 1956, after Wooler's death. An example can be seen in the British National Motorcycle Museum.

== See also ==
- List of car manufacturers of the United Kingdom
