= Quarterbridge Crossing =

Former railway crossing in Isle of Man, UK

Coordinates: 54°09′21″N 4°30′06″W

Quarterbridge Crossing (Manx: Crossag Droghad y Cherroo) was the first major crossing point of the Isle of Man Railway's first line from Douglas to Peel. It opened in 1873, but was advertised station until 1929 , then used occasionally until closed in 1968, with the rest of the line.

== History ==
A gated railway crossing and keeper's lodge was built at the Quarterbridge near the confluence of the Rivers Dhoo and Glass in the town of Douglas, Isle of Man, for the opening of the first passenger narrow-gauge (3 ft) railway in 1873. The approach to the Quarterbridge, a mile from Douglas Terminus, was by an 86 ft lattice girder bridge across the River Glass which replaced an earlier structure in 1902.

The Douglas to Peel railway line crossed the A5 New Castletown Road at the Quarterbridge and followed the River Dhoo and a gradient of 1/105 for a short distance. The line at this point ran parallel to the A1 Douglas to Peel road which is part of the Snaefell Mountain Course used for the Isle of Man TT and Manx Grand Prix races. The requests for the Isle of Man Railway Company to construct a small halt at the Quarterbridge to be called Spring Valley, never came to fulfillment. A small halt and cattle bank existed from 1928 until 1929 and was used for agricultural shows held at the nearby Kirby House Estate. A small siding was built on the eastern-side of the Quarterbridge crossing in the 1930s for the development of the King Edward Park and this Belle Vue siding existed from 1935–1941.

The Douglas to Peel railway closed in 1968, and the rail tracks were lifted between 1975 and 1976. During the 1980s, the course of the railway line between the Quarterbridge and Braddan Bridge was surfaced with tarmac, which became an access-road used during the Isle of Man TT races.

== Railway route ==
Preceding station	Disused railways	Following station
Douglas terminus	Isle of Man Railway; Peel Line	Braddan Halt towards Peel
