= Isle of Man Railway rolling stock =

The rolling stock used on the Isle of Man Railway today is entirely original. Although the number of serviceable carriages dropped from an original total of 75 to as low as 14, this total is once again increasing due to recent rebuilds. The 3 ft (914 mm) gauge railway has been provided with a variety of stock from different manufacturers over its time. Types of coaches were categorized according to a lettering system: the original four-wheeled coaches were designated as A, B, C, and D types, and so on. The F prefix encompassed all bogie vehicles, including conversions from the A-D series. Letters G-M denoted goods stock, while N referred to ex-Manx Northern Railway six-wheel carriages.

== Four-Wheelers (1873–1874) ==
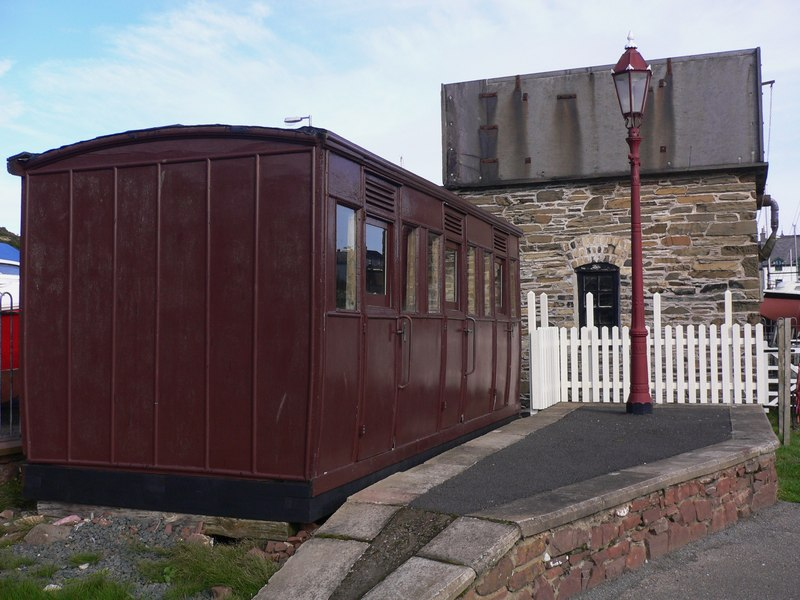
Surviving four-wheel carriage C.1 on the site of Peel Station where it remains on display.

Four-wheeled carriages were supplied for the opening of the line to Peel in 1873. These were close-coupled in pairs from the late 1880s. Each class of carriage had a different internal layout. "A" class carriages were 17 ft 6 in (5.33 m) long, while the remainder were one foot (305 mm) shorter.

Class "A" consisted of twelve first-class carriages – eleven three-compartment carriages and one saloon. The "B" class consisted of 24 three-compartment third-class carriages, open above the seat backs. The "C" class (14 built) had two third-class compartments and a brake compartment – one coach was later converted to a saloon. The "D" class consisted of a pair of composites arranged 3/1/3, with the first-class compartment being wider at the expense of the third-class passengers.

All these were later converted into bogie carriages by mounting pairs of bodies on bogie underframes supplied by the Metropolitan Carriage & Wagon Co. They became known as the "pairs" coaches and were later renumbered into the F.50-F.75 series. Today, only C.1 survives in its original form, albeit only for display purposes.

Key:	Paired	Preserved

No.	Year	Builder	Configuration	Seats	Status	Paired
A.1 – A.6	1873	Metropolitan Carriage & Wagon	Guard / 3rd / 3rd	20	See "Pairs" F.50-F.75 Below	1909–1926
A.7 – A.11	1874	Metropolitan Carriage & Wagon	Guard / 3rd / 3rd	20	See "Pairs" F.50-F.75 Below	1911–1922
A.12	1873	Metropolitan Carriage & Wagon	1st Saloon	20	Ducal Saloon With C.9	1926
B.1 – B.10	1873	Metropolitan Carriage & Wagon	Guard / 3rd / 3rd	20	See "Pairs" F.50-F.75 Below	1909–1922
B.11 – B.22	1874	Metropolitan Carriage & Wagon	3rd / 3rd / 3rd	20	See "Pairs" F.50-F.75 Below	1911–1925
C.1	1873	Metropolitan Carriage & Wagon	Guard / 2nd / 2nd	20	Peel Station Displayed	1910
C.9	1873	Metropolitan Carriage & Wagon	First Saloon	18	Ducal Saloon With A.12	1926
C.2 – C.7	1873	Metropolitan Carriage & Wagon	1st / 1st / 3rd	20	See "Pairs" F.50-F.75 Below	1910–1925
C.8 – C.14	1874	Metropolitan Carriage & Wagon	1st / 1st / 3rd	20	See "Pairs" F.50-F.75 Below	1909–1926
D.1 – D.2	1873	Metropolitan Carriage & Wagon	3rd / 3rd / 3rd	20	See "Pairs" F.50-F.75 Below	1909–1926

== "Small F" Carriages (1876–1896) ==
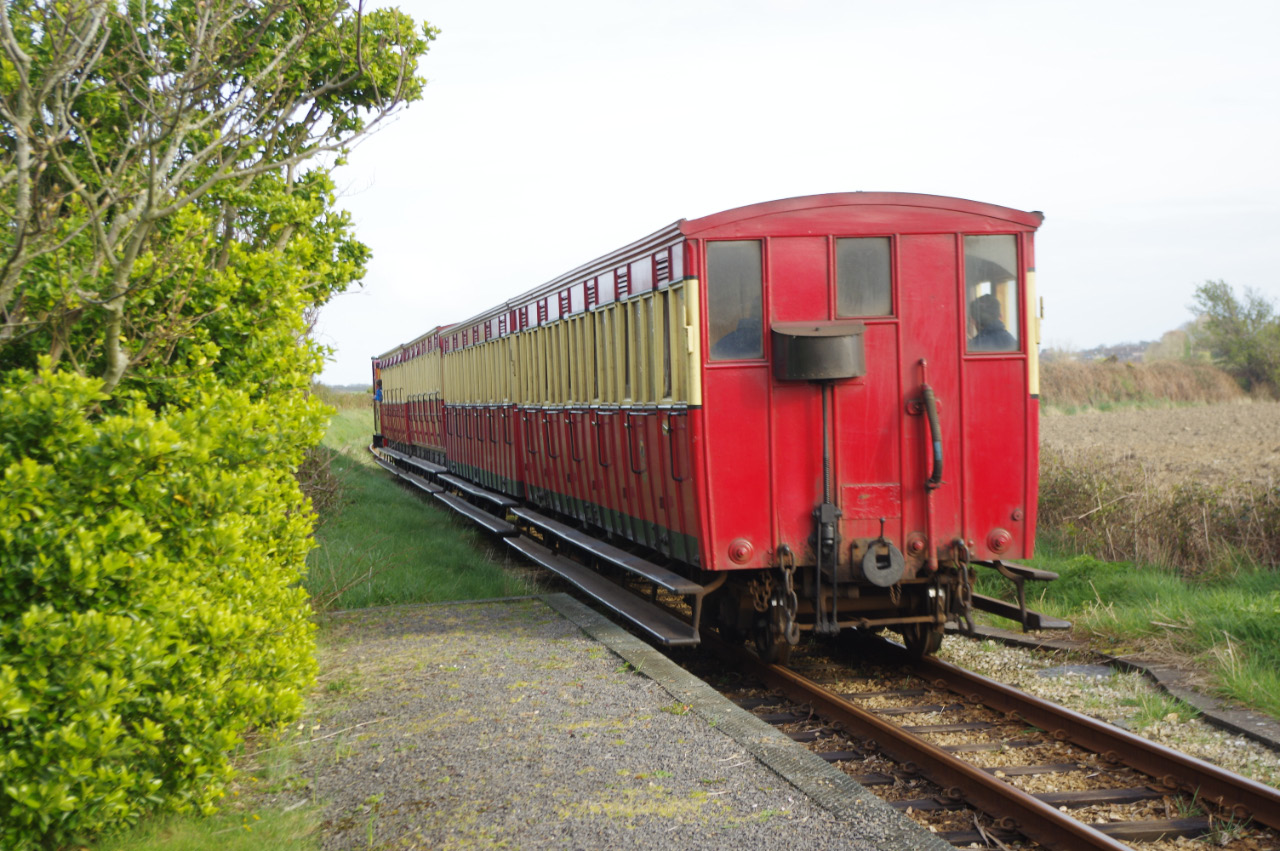
A typical example of a small "F" Carriage, F.18, at the rear of a train passing through Ballabeg Station on the return trip.

The initial batch of carriages was supplied by Brown Marshalls and became known as the "Small Fs" due to their smaller size compared to later vehicles. These carriages were 35 feet long and 9'6" from rail to roof. All had wooden frames concealed by the lower panelling of the carriage bodies. At various periods, a broad black stripe at the bottom of the lower panels indicated where the frames would normally show. This feature was reinstated in 2013.

Coaches listed with "Guard" in the layout had a handbrake fitted in a locking housing in one of the end compartments. In addition to the handbrake, a lookout window was cut in the end of the carriage. This allowed a brakeman to ride in this compartment and provide additional braking on heavier trains before the days of continuous vacuum brakes. F.19 and F.20 were the first two "half luggage vans" delivered to the railway, with half of the carriage occupied by three third-class compartments and the other half by a luggage compartment complete with guard's look-out duckets.

Key:	Stored	Scrapped	Restored	Undergoing Restoration

№	Year	Builder	Layout Type	No. Seats	Current Status	Scrap Date
F.1	1876	Brown Marshall	Guard / 3rd / 3rd 3rd / 3rd / 3rd	40	Destroyed (Controlled Fire) St. John's	1976
F.2	1876	Brown Marshall	Guard / 3rd / 3rd 3rd / 3rd / 3rd	40	Destroyed (Controlled Fire) St. John's	1976
F.3	1876	Brown Marshall	Guard / 3rd / 3rd 3rd / 3rd / 3rd	40	Sold, Welsh Highland Railway 1975	198?
F.4	1876	Brown Marshall	Guard / 3rd / 3rd 3rd / 3rd / 3rd	40	Destroyed (Controlled Fire) St. John's	1976
F.5	1876	Brown Marshall	Guard / 3rd / 3rd 3rd / 3rd / 3rd	40	Destroyed (Controlled Fire) St. John's	1976
F.6	1876	Brown Marshall	Guard / 3rd / 1st / 1st / 3rd / 3rd	40	Owned I.o.M.S.R.S.A. Restoration Ongoing	~
F.7	1881	Ashbury Carriage	Guard / 3rd / 3rd 3rd / 3rd / 3rd	40	Destroyed (Controlled Fire) St. John's	1976
F.8	1881	Ashbury Carriage	Guard / 3rd / 3rd 3rd / 3rd / 3rd	40	Withdrawn 1965, Destroyed Controlled Fire	1970
F.9	1881	Brown Marshall	Guard / 3rd / 1st / 1st / 3rd / 3rd	48	Rebuilt 1987–1992	~
F.10	1881	Brown Marshall	3rd / 3rd 3rd / 3rd 3rd / 3rd	48	Rebuilt 2023-2026	~
F.11	1881	Brown Marshall	3rd / 3rd 3rd / 3rd 3rd / 3rd	48	Rebuilt 2020-2024	~
F.12	1881	Brown Marshall	3rd / 3rd 3rd / 3rd 3rd / 3rd	48	To Derby Castle	1982
F.13	1894	Brown Marshall	3rd / 3rd / 1st / 1st / 3rd 3rd	48	Destroyed (Controlled Fire) St. John's	1976
F.14	1894	Brown Marshall	Guard / 3rd 3rd / 3rd 3rd / 3rd	40	Destroyed, (Controlled Fire) St. John's	1976
F.15	1894	Brown Marshall	3rd / 3rd / 1st / 1st / 3rd / Guard	40	Rebuilt 2019-2021	~
F.16	1894	Brown Marshall	3rd / 3rd 3rd / 3rd 3rd / 3rd	40	Destroyed (Controlled Fire) St. John's	1976
F.17	1894	Brown Marshall	3rd / 3rd 3rd / 3rd 3rd / 3rd	40	Destroyed (Controlled Fire) St. John's	1976
F.18	1894	Brown Marshall	Guard / 3rd 3rd / 3rd / 3rd / 3rd	40	Roof Replaced 1989–1990	~
F.19	1894	Brown Marshall	Luggage / 3rd / 3rd / 3rd	24	Destroyed (Controlled Fire) St. John's	1976
F.20	1896	Metro Cammell	Luggage / 3rd / 3rd / 3rd	24	Destroyed (Controlled Fire) St. John's	1976
F.21	1896	Metro Cammell	Guard / 3rd 3rd / 3rd 3rd / 3rd	40	Stored Port Erin Partially Restored	~
F.22	1896	Metro Cammell	3rd / 3rd 3rd / 3rd 3rd / 3rd	40	Destroyed (Controlled Fire) St. John's	1976
F.23	1896	Metro Cammell	3rd / 3rd 3rd / 3rd 3rd / 3rd	40	Frames Scrapped 2011	1983
F.24	1896	Metro Cammell	3rd / 3rd 3rd / 3rd 3rd / 3rd	40	Destroyed (Controlled Fire) St. John's	1976
F.25	1896	Metro Cammell	3rd / 3rd 3rd / 3rd 3rd / Guard	40	Withdrawn 1998; Stored Port Erin	~
F.26	1896	Metro Cammell	Guard / 3rd 3rd / 3rd 3rd / 3rd	40	In Traffic	~

== The Empress Vans (1897) ==
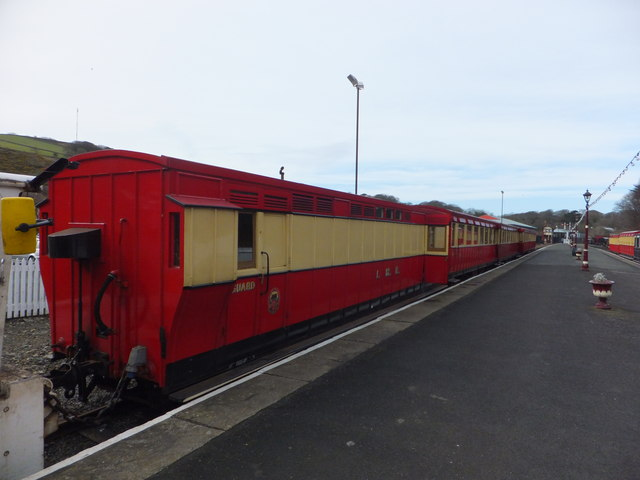
Modern replica of F.27, part of the dining train at Douglas Station. This carriage is fitted with a kitchen, toilet, generator room, and guard's compartment.

Two identical vehicles were supplied to the railway in 1897 and became known as the Empress Vans to acknowledge the fact that the year of delivery was Queen Victoria's jubilee year. These vans are the same length as the passenger vehicles but are entirely closed with no windows. They have guard's lookout duckets attached. They were purchased for the railway's Luggage In Advance service on the South Line, whereby passengers' luggage was transported to its destination ahead of them and was already at their hotels on arrival, usually in Port Erin or Port St. Mary.

Their busy careers also saw them in use as an ambulance train in conjunction with the T.T. and Manx Grand Prix races held annually on the island until the closure of the Peel and Ramsey lines in 1968. They were stored outdoors for a number of years and were also used by Campamarina at Castletown Station, fitted with bunk beds from 1979 to 1986. Despite their poor condition, both vans remain on the railway, having last been used in 1992.

The original F.27 was stripped to form the basis of a replica kitchen for the dining train in 2012, with only the underframes surviving today. F.28 remains stored, while the replica (also numbered F.27) is used regularly on the dining services.

Key:	Replica	Stored

№	Built	Builder	Type	Status
F.27 (i)	1897	Metro Cammell	Open Luggage Van	Body Scrapped 2012; Stored Douglas Workshops
F.27 (ii)	2013	Isle of Man Railway	Kitchen / Generator / Guards'	In traffic
F.28	1897	Metro Cammell	Open Luggage Van	Withdrawn 1992 Stored Douglas Workshops

== The Saloons / "Corridors" (1905) ==
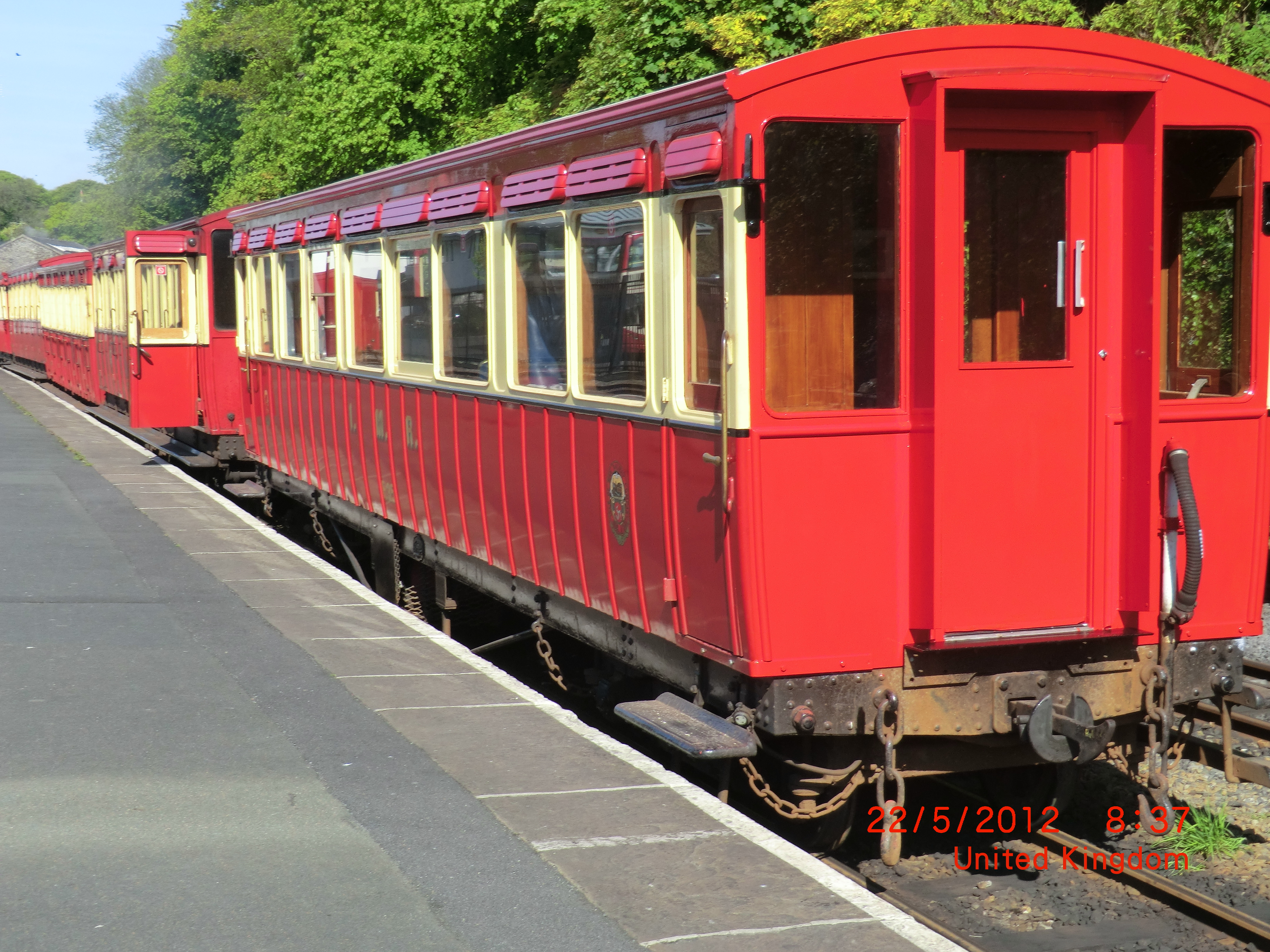
Known as the Cardinal's Saloon, composite F.35 now forms the central part of the railway's dining train with the former third-class vestibule given over to the bar area; at the platform at Douglas Station.

The amalgamation of the Manx Northern Railway into the I.M.R. in 1905 led to an urgent need to buy more carriages so that the Manx Northern's cramped six-wheelers could be removed from front-line service. Like all of the later carriages of the "F" class, the saloons were supplied by the Metropolitan Carriage & Wagon Company (which had absorbed Brown, Marshalls in 1902). The sequence begins with F.29 in 1905. They were the first to be built with wooden bodies on steel underframes and are 37' 0" long and 10'3" from rail to roof.

All survive today; F.35, F.31, and F.32 were converted in 1980 to form the Bar Set. At that time, half the seating was removed from F.35, and a small bar and chemical toilet were fitted, along with gangways to the adjoining coaches. Later, as F.31 was withdrawn for major bodywork attention, F.29 was fitted with a corridor and replaced the former vehicle. The saloons have remained unpopular with locomotive crews as they are heavy yet do not carry as many passengers as the standard compartment stock. Sketches survive which show that some consideration was given to building these carriages as saloons with a large brake-luggage compartment. As of February 2015, all saloons except F.36 are fitted with corridor connections to form a dining train, with F.27 (ii) at the rear providing the kitchen facilities and generator.

Key:	Restored / Dining	Preserved

№	Builder	Layout	Corridor	Former Layout	Converted	Notes
F.29	Metro Cammell	Dining (Bay)	2013	3rd / 3rd	2015	Refitted 1990 / As Dining Train 2013
F.30	Metro Cammell	Dining (6-0)	2012	1st / 3rd	2012	To Purple Lake livery, March 2025
F.31	Metro Cammell	Dining (Bay)	1981	3rd / 3rd	2012	To Purple Lake livery, May 2023
F.32	Metro Cammell	Dining (2-2)	1981	1st / 3rd	2013	To Purple Lake, February 2026
F.35	Metro Cammell	Bar / 1st	1981	1st / 3rd	1980	Cardinal's Saloon Bar Fitted 1979 / Refit 2014
F.36	Metro Cammell	1st / 3rd	~	~	~	Royal Saloon Isle of Man Railway Museum

== The Hurst Nelsons (1899) ==
These were the first two bogie vehicles built for the Manx Northern Railway. They were the first passenger vehicles on steel underframes to enter service on the island's railway network, as well as the first to have electric lighting. They were purchased to act as through coaches to Douglas. Externally, they are not terribly different from the other "Big Fs". Together with the Foxdale Coach, they were allocated numbers in the "F" class upon take-over in 1905. Remaining stock inherited from the Manx Northern Railway was either given the "N" prefix or, in the case of non-passenger stock, a small "r" was added to the title, as explained below. Both vehicles were sold in 1975 to the Peter Rampton and later became part of the Vale of Rheidol Railway Museum Collection but were returned to railway ownership in 2022 and restoration commenced in 2024 with one completed the next year at which point the second vehicle was commenced.

Key:	Restored	Undergoing Restoration

M.N.R.	I.M.R.	Year	Builder	Configuration	Seats	Withdrawn	Notes
No.15	F.37	1899	Hurst Nelson	Guard / 3rd / 1st / 1st / 3rd / 3rd	40	1972	Restored 2024-2026
No.16	F.38	1899	Hurst Nelson	3rd / 3rd / 1st / 1st / 3rd / 3rd	48	1969	Off-Island October 2025

== The Foxdale Coach (1887) ==
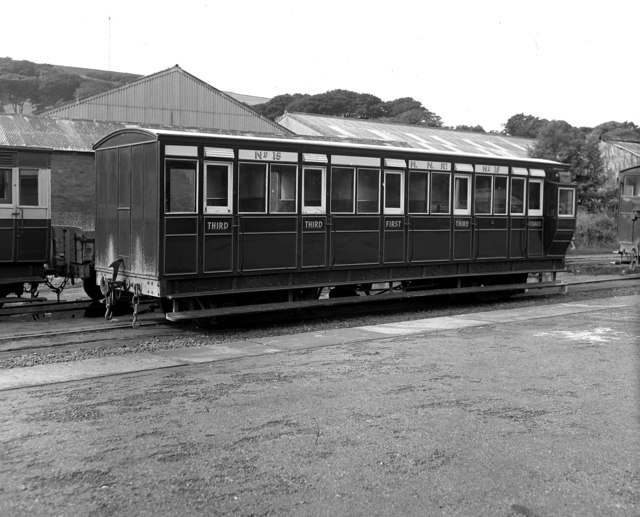
As restored in 1979 at Douglas Station shortly after restoration for the Manx Northern Railway centenary.

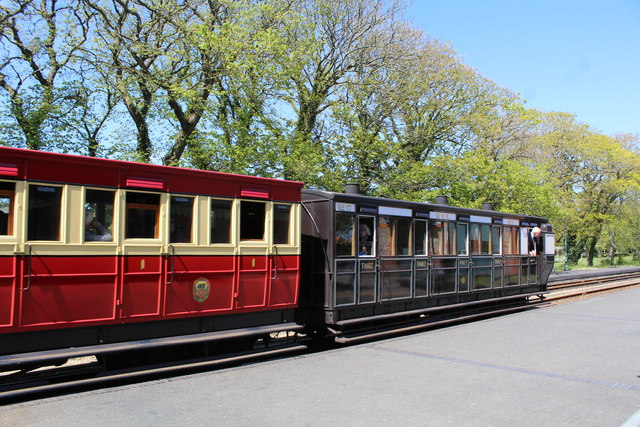
Castletown Station.

Yet another oddity is this carriage originating from the Foxdale Railway. It was built by the Oldbury Railway Carriage and Wagon Co in 1886 for the small branch to Foxdale. This is a true survivor of the system and is still in operation today. It is the smallest bogie carriage on the system, being only 30' 0" long, and rides on plate frame bogies.

As constructed, it had four third-class compartments and a small luggage and guard's compartment complete with lookout duckets, which took up a little over a third of the length of the vehicle. One of the compartments was converted into a first-class section, which led to the carriage acquiring the nickname Kitto's Coach after the Captain of the Foxdale Mines, who had a first-class free pass on the Manx Northern.

It was converted into a camping coach in 1967 and painted into a non-typical blue and yellow livery. It was painted into its original livery and renumbered No. 15 for a short time in 1979 to mark the centenary of the Manx Northern Railway, before reverting to fleet livery of purple lake and regaining the fleet number F.39.

She carried the red and cream livery from 1999 until 2013, when the coach was repainted into the Manx Northern Railway livery and renumbered M.N.Ry. No. 17. The first-class compartment was also reinstated at this time, reducing the seating capacity by two seats as armrests were provided. It was withdrawn at the end of the 2021 season, and the bogies were removed for attention. The carriage also underwent a full repaint, retaining the purple lake scheme with additional gold/blue lining detail applied to the lower panelling and relocation of fleet detailing.

M.N.R.	I.M.R.	Year	Builder	Configuration	Seats	Notes
№17	F.39	1887	Oldbury Carriage & Wagon Co.	Guard / 3rd / 1st / 3rd 3rd	28	Restored 2013

== "Large F" Carriages (1905–1926) ==
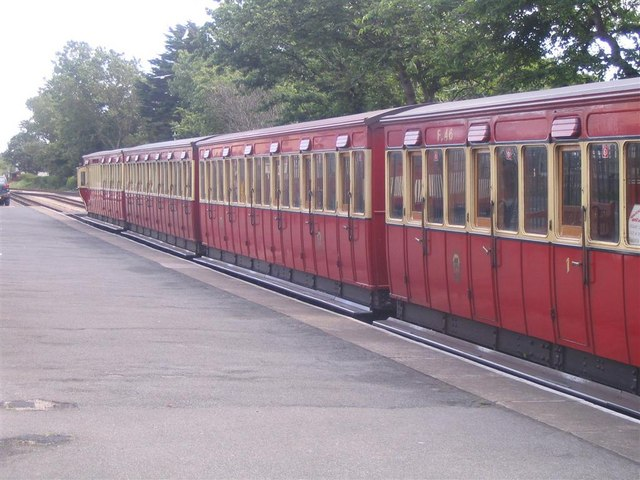
A rake of large "F" carriages (F.46-F.49) at Port Erin Station; they are commonly marshalled in this way.

Built to the same larger profile as the saloons, these carriages still provide the backbone of the service fleet today and have rarely been out of traffic since their arrival on the island. They all now carry the standard red and cream livery and are the best-represented type of carriage on the railway today. Generally operated as a set with other carriages added subject to traffic demands, a number remain in storage, notably F.43, the earliest surviving example.

Other earlier carriages in the series have all had their bodies scrapped. These were all "half luggage" or sometimes erroneously referred to as "brake vans" or commonly "big brakes." Now scrapped, F.41 had its luggage space converted in 1979 to create what was, to date, the railway's only dedicated disabled access carriage. This was achieved by glazing the luggage panels, fitting the carriage with longitudinal bench seating, and creating glazed bulkhead panels.

Key:	In Traffic	Stored	Scrapped	Undergoing Restoration

№	Built	Builder	Type	Seats	Notes	Scrap
F.33	1905	Metro-Cammell	3rd / 3rd / 3rd / Luggage	24	Frames Remain – See Below	1983
F.34	1905	Metro-Cammell	3rd / 3rd / 3rd / Luggage	24	Destroyed (Controlled Fire) St. John's	1976
F.40	1907	Metro-Cammell	3rd / 3rd / 3rd / Luggage	24	Underframe Retained (Flat Wagon)	1977
F.41	1907	Metro-Cammell	3rd / 3rd / 3rd / Disabled	24	Withdrawn 1990 – Underframe Scrapped 2019	2003
F.42	1907	Metro-Cammell	3rd / 3rd / 3rd / Luggage	24	Destroyed (Controlled Fire) St. John's	1976
F.43	1908	Metro-Cammell	3rd / 3rd / 3rd / Luggage	24	Withdrawn 1983 – Stored Port Erin Station	~
F.44	1908	Metro-Cammell	3rd / 3rd / 3rd / Luggage	24	Frames Scrapped 2010	1983
F.45	1913	Metro-Cammell	3rd / 3rd / 1st / 1st / 3rd / Guard	40	Turned 1985 (Guards' Douglas End)	~
F.46	1913	Metro-Cammell	Guard / 3rd / 1st / 1st / 3rd / 3rd	40	Guards' Port Erin End	~
F.47	1923	Metro-Cammell	3rd / 3rd / 3rd / 3rd / 3rd / 3rd	48	All Thirds & Braked	~
F.48	1923	Metro-Cammell	3rd / 3rd / 3rd / 3rd / 3rd / 3rd	48	All Thirds & Un-Braked – Through-Piped	~
F.49	1926	Metro-Cammell	3rd / 3rd / 3rd / Luggage	24	Last Carriage Delivered – Rebuilt 2018-2020	~

== The "Pairs" (1909–1926) ==
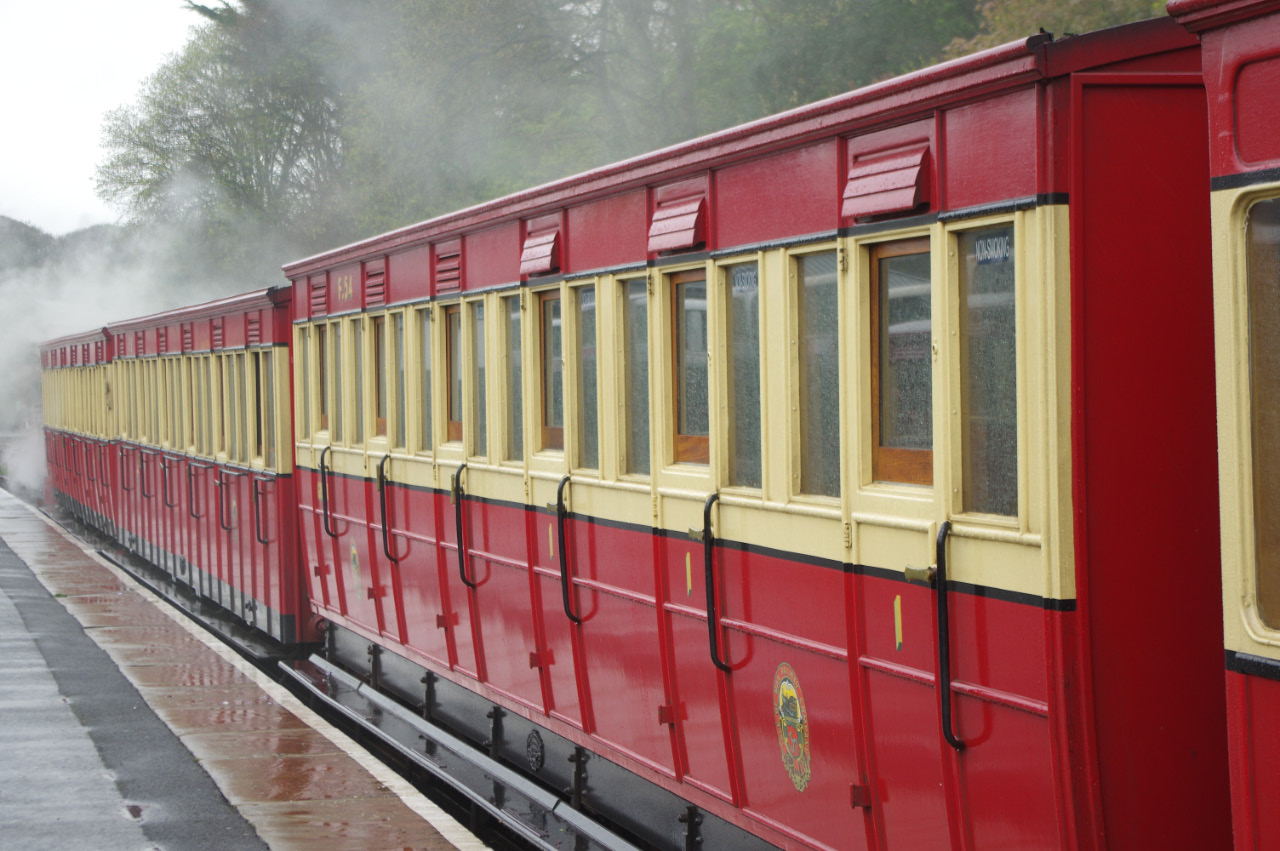
One of three restored "Pairs" carriages, F.62, in use at Douglas Station shortly after re-entering service for the first time since 1987. This example, and F.54 feature three first-class compartments, whereas F.63 has a triple open compartment, making it popular with larger groups travelling.

To simplify the marshalling of trains and reduce their overall length, the original four-wheeled stock was close-coupled in pairs from 1887 onwards. This involved removing the chopper couplers from one end of each vehicle and replacing them with conventional side buffers on one carriage and rubbing plates on the other. A link and pin coupling then joined the inner ends of the carriages, while conventional chopper couplings were retained on the outer ends of each pair.

There was a further development of this policy between 1909 and 1926, when the bodies of the four-wheel coaches were removed from their original chassis and mounted in pairs onto bogie underframes supplied by Metropolitan. By the late 1950s, relatively few were used in regular service, but two sets were reserved for school traffic. These were used in regular service on exceptionally busy days, such as Tynwald Day, but otherwise were confined to the school runs. By this time, they were painted in a utilitarian all-over brown colour scheme.

Oddly, several of the pairs were rehabilitated in the early 1970s, as their steel frames were of relatively recent date. A number had their bodies removed and later scrapped in 1968. The frames were used as runners for the short-lived Mantainor scheme; these were later sold to the Festiniog (now Ffestiniog) Railway. Surviving unrestored examples (F.66, F.67, and F.74) are in poor condition, as their bodies date from 1873, and they have been surrounded by a certain amount of controversy in recent years, having been removed from the railway for storage. The Isle of Man Steam Railway Supporters' Association has campaigned for their retention on the railway.

Three have been fully restored and are now in regular traffic. The final example, F.75, is unique in consisting of two saloon bodies known as the Ducal or Governors' Saloon; this is resident in the railway's museum in unrestored condition.

Key:	Runner	Stored	Preserved	Scrapped	Restored

№	Frame	Builder (Underframe)	Former №s	Seats	Notes	Scrap
F.50	1925	Metro Cammell	B.7 – B.8	48	Frames as runner (1975 as "R.13"), Later Scrapped	1974
F.51	1912	Metro Cammell	B.3 – B.5	48	Frames converted 'R' Series (as below) Later Sold	1968
F.52	1912	Metro Cammell	A.2 – C.2	48	Frames converted 'R' Series (as below) Later Sold	1967
F.53	1919	Metro Cammell	A.5 – B.21	48	Frames converted 'R' Series (as below) scrapped	1968
F.54	1923	Metro Cammell	A.7 – C.10	48	Restored, rebuilt 1993–1999 In Traffic	1972
F.55	1912	Metro Cammell	B.2 – C.6	48	Frames Converted 'R' Series (as below) Later Sold	1968
F.56	1924	Metro Cammell	A.8 – C.8	48	Frames converted 'R' Series (as below) Later Sold	1968
F.57	1919	Metro Cammell	B.16 – B.20	48	Frames In Departmental Use (As Flat Wagon)	1995
F.58	1918	Metro Cammell	B.18 – C.3	48	Frames Converted 'R' Series (as below) scrapped	1968
F.59	1920	Metro Cammell	A.6 – C.4	48	Frames converted 'R' Series (as below) scrapped	1968
F.60	1916	Metro Cammell	B.13 – B.24	48	Frames converted 'R' Series (as below) scrapped	1968
F.61	1910	Metro Cammell	A.10 – C.12	48	Frames converted R.6 (as below) Later Sold	1968
F.62	1926	Metro Cammell	A.1 – B.1	48	Withdrawn 1987, Restored 2018-2021 In Traffic	~
F.63	1910	Metro Cammell	B.6 – B.10	48	Withdrawn 1987, Restored 2021-2023 In Traffic	~
F.64	1912	Metro Cammell	C.1 – B.19	48	Frames Extant (C.1 Body Displayed Peel Station)	1978
F.65	1910	Metro Cammell	B.22 – C.7	48	Ballast Hopper No.1 (as below) scrapped 2020	1983
F.66	1910	Metro Cammell	B.11 – B.15	48	Withdrawn 1999 – Stored Jurby Airfield 2020	~
F.67	1922	Metro Cammell	B.23 – C.14	48	Withdrawn 1999 – Stored Jurby Airfield 2020	~
F.68	1909	Metro Cammell	A.9 – C.13	48	Displayed Vale of Rheidol Railway Aberystwyth	~
F.69	1923	Metro Cammell	B.4 – B.17	48	Frames converted 'R' Series (See Below) scrapped	1969
F.70	1922	Metro Cammell	B.9 – B.14	48	Withdrawn 1987, In Traffic (As Ballast Hopper No.2)	2000
F.71	1911	Metro Cammell	B.12 – C.5	48	Withdrawn 1979, Frames Scrapped 2024	1983
F.72	1926	Metro Cammell	A.3 – D.2	48	Frames converted R.8 (as below) Later Sold	1967
F.73	1920	Metro Cammell	A.4 – D.1	48	Withdrawn 1979, in departmental use as flatbed	1982
F.74	1921	Metro Cammell	A.11 – C.11	48	Withdrawn 1999 – Stored Jurby Airfield 2020	~
F.75	1926	Metro Cammell	A.12 – C.9	48	Withdrawn 1974 Isle of Man Railway Museum	~

== "N" Six-Wheel Carriages (1879) ==
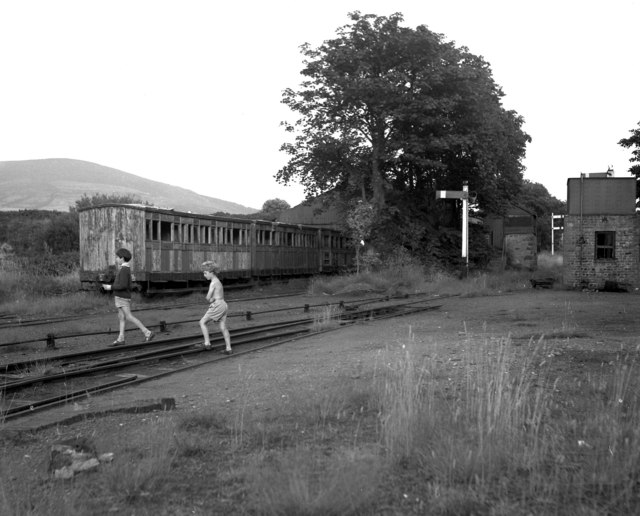
Cleminson carriages were stored in the open at St. John's Station following withdrawal. Several were saved and preserved, with one now restored and in serviceable condition, though in private ownership and extant in the Isle of Man Railway Museum. This view dates from September 1971.

For its opening in 1879, the Manx Northern Railway ordered fourteen carriages. These were 30-foot-long, six-wheel carriages built on Cleminson's patent underframes, which were five feet shorter than the Isle of Man Railway's "small Fs". Cleminson's patent enjoyed a brief vogue in the late 1870s as an alternative to bogie carriages, mainly due to its low tare weight. The Southwold Railway, which opened the same year as the Manx Northern, also used Cleminson's patent underframes for its passenger stock and some high-capacity freight wagons. The North Wales Narrow Gauge and West Donegal Railways also used the system on coaches, and a Cleminson wagon survives on the Ffestiniog.

Two of the Manx Northern "N" class carriages were built as first-class; two as composites; and ten as either third-class or third-brake carriages. The first-class carriages were arranged as three small saloons and seated 42. The third-class carriages must have been quite cramped internally, as the compartments were only 4'10" (1.47 m) wide, ten inches less than the IMR bogie carriages. Both of the composites and about half of the third-class carriages were built with a handbrake wheel in an end compartment that could be locked away when not in use and the compartment used for passengers.

Two of the third-class carriages were damaged in minor collisions or suffered underframe failure before the Manx Northern was taken over by the Isle of Man Railway. Twelve of the class passed to the IMR's ownership in 1905. J.I.C. Boyd (The Isle of Man Railway Oakwood Press, 1967) states that the original intention was to number them into the "F" series, hence the numbers 40 to 51, but as they were six-wheelers, they were given the prefix "N" – the next available letter in the IMR's coding system – to distinguish them from the bogie carriages.

Photographs suggest that at least some of the "N" series carriages remained in service in the 1920s and 30s. It is not clear when they fell into disuse. For many years, they were stored in a siding behind St. John's station carriage shed. The body of one of the "N" class carriages survives on the line today as the mess hut at Douglas station. This body came from N.41 and was placed in front of the locomotive shed in 1964, replacing another former six-wheeler. Between 1999 and 2013, it was stored on a runner behind the carriage shed at Douglas, but it has now returned to its former position, has been partly restored, and is used as an oil store.

Another composite carriage, N.42, was kept at the Port Erin museum until it was rebuilt in 1998, when it was placed in store. It was not returned to the completed museum but, despite being owned privately, it remained on the railway until finally removed (in the face of much objection) to Southwold in 2013. A third is in private preservation in the north of the island together with a Beyer Peacock locomotive, No. 14 Thornhill (Ex-Manx Northern).

Of the other ten carriages, one was withdrawn in 1903, a second in 1905, and a third in the 1920s. This was used as a Mess Room at Douglas Station and was later replaced by the body of N.41. The other eight were scrapped, some after being damaged in a fire in 1975, which also destroyed most of the 1876 batch of wooden bogie carriages.

Key:	Scrapped	Restored	Preserved	Sold

M.N.R.	I.M.R.	Builder	Layout	Seats	Notes	Scrap
№1	N.40	Swansea	All 1st Class	24	Sold 1975 (Rampton), now owned by Vale of Rheidol Railway.	–
№2	N.41	Swansea	3rd & 1st Saloons	24	Frames Scrap, – Body "Bothy" (Butchers' Coach)	–
№3	N.42	Swansea	Guard / 3rd 3rd / 3rd	48	Sold 1975 – Extant Weetings Farm, Suffolk	–
№4	N.43	Swansea	Guard / 3rd Class	32	Withdrawn 1944, Fire Damaged – St. John's Shed Fire	1975
№5	N.44	Swansea	Guard / 3rd Class	24	Withdrawn 1944, Fire Damaged – St. John's Shed Fire	1975
№6	N.45	Swansea	Guard / 3rd Classes	24	Privately Restored 1978-2020 Isle of Man Railway Museum	–
№7	N.46	Swansea	Guard / 3rd Class	24	Withdrawn 1944, Fire Damaged – St. John's Shed Fire	1975
№8	N.47	Swansea	Open 3rds / Open 3rds	32	Withdrawn 1944, Fire Damaged – St. John's Shed Fire	1975
№9	N.48	Swansea	Open 3rds / Open 3rds	32	Stored Latterly Douglas Station 1967–1972	1972
№11	N.49	Swansea	Open 3rds / Open 3rds	32	Withdrawn 1944, Fire Damaged – St. John's Shed Fire	1975
№13	N.50	Swansea	Open 3rds / Open 3rds	32	Withdrawn 1944, Fire Damaged – St. John's Shed Fire	1975
№14	N.51	Swansea	Open 3rds / Open 3rds	32	Sold 1975 (Rampton), now owned by Vale of Rheidol Railway.	–
№10	–	Swansea	3rd Class Comp.	32	Scrapped Early – Never Allocted I.M.R. Fleet Number	19??
№12	–	Swansea	Open 3rds / Open 3rds	32	Original Bothy – Douglas Station – Replaced by N.41	1964

== "E" Class Brake Vans (1873–1895) ==
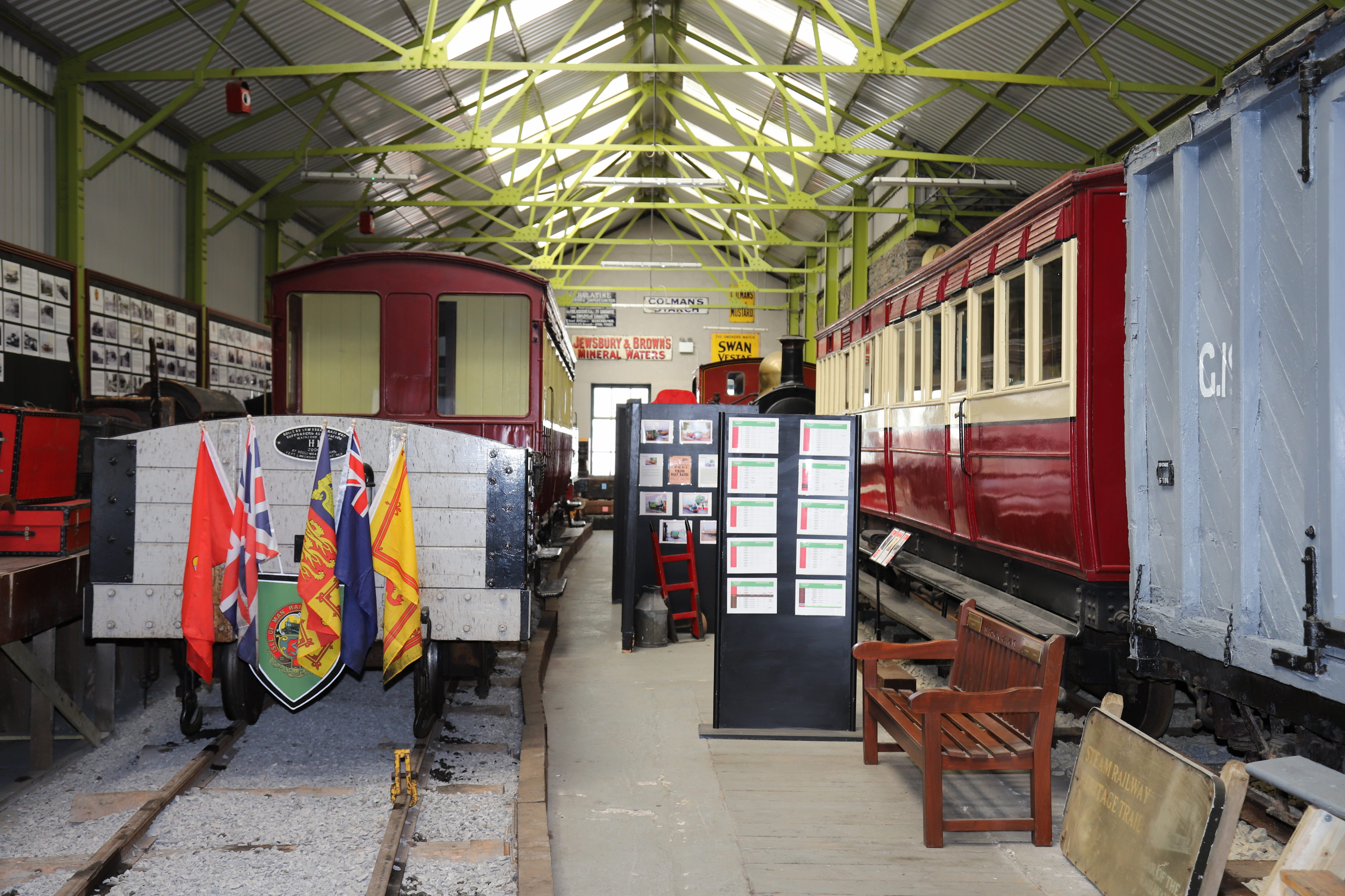
G.19 (on the far right) which was built as brake Van E.3 and later converted; now in the Isle of Man Railway Museum displayed with other rolling stock.

These were four-wheeled brake and luggage vans fitted with lookout duckets, but otherwise entirely sealed with only two drop-sash windows at the guard's door. Originally, these vans were intended to be capable of carrying ten passengers in a single compartment, according to Metropolitan's original drawings (conjecturally shown adjacent), but this was never carried out. None of these vans survive today, and they were effectively made redundant when later passenger coaches had their own braking systems.

The primary purpose of the "E" van was to provide luggage accommodation and braking for the original "A" – "D" class, most of which did not have their own brakes when supplied in 1873/4. One surviving member of the class sat at the end of the Port Erin arrival platform at Douglas for many years and retained its pre-war two-tone brown livery. The Manx Northern Railway owned a pair of similar vans for use with the "N" class carriages, but these seem to have been replaced in the 1890s and then used for goods traffic until they were scrapped in the 1920s.

The possibility of the Isle of Man Steam Railway Supporters' Association recreating one of these vehicles has been mooted in the past but never reached fruition.

Key:	Scrapped	Preserved

No.	Built	Builder	Status	Scrap
E.1 (i)	1873	Metro Cammell	Destroyed (Collision), Frames To G.7	1893
E.1 (ii)	1894	Metro Cammell	Renumbered E.4 (ii) "Ballasalla Bonfire"	1974
E.2	1873	Metro Cammell	Body To Santon Station Grounded Store	1975
E.3	1873	Metro Cammell	Frames Converted G.19 (1921) Extant Isle of Man Railway Museum	~
E.4	1873	Metro Cammell	Frames Converted Fish Wagon No.3 & Body Scrapped	1923
E.5	1876	Metro Cammell	Mobile Store Douglas Station Until 1963	1974
E.6	1876	Metro Cammell	Body To Peel Road Grounded Store	1975
E.7	1895	Isle of Man Railway Co., Ltd.	Body To Sulby Bridge Grounded Store; Frames To K.5 (ii)	1937
Er.8	1895	Manx Northern Railway Co., Ltd.	Ex-M.N.R. No.16 – Body To Colby Station Grounded Store	1972
Er.9	1895	Manx Northern Railway Co., Ltd.	Ex-M.N.Ry. No.19 – Renumbered E.1 (iii); "Ballasalla Bonfire"	1974
Er.10	1879	Swansea Carriage & Wagon Co.	Ex-M.N.R. No.16 – Later E.4 (ii) – Used With Crane "Ballasalla Bonfire"	1974
–	1879	Swansea Carriage & Wagon Co.	M.N.R. No.15 – I.M.R. Number Not Allocated	1974

== "G" Closed Vans (1873–1921) ==
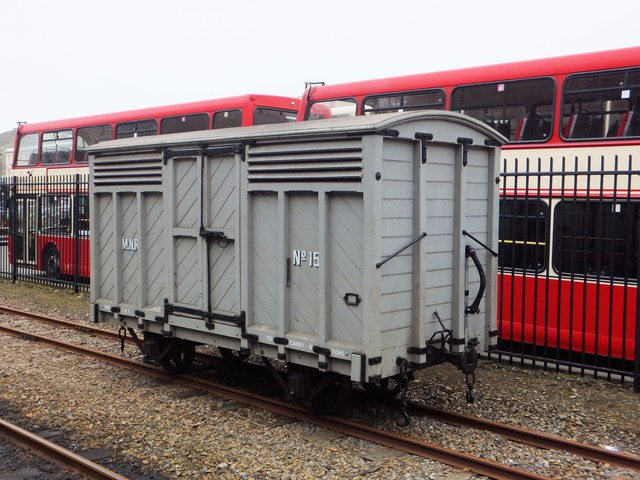
Gr.12, which was built as M.N.Ry. No.15, in the yard at Douglas Station in 2019 with original fleet detailing.

These were four-wheeled closed vans, often attached to the rear of a passenger train to transport goods to the rural communities that the railway served for many years. Upon amalgamation with the Manx Northern Railway in 1905, five were inherited. Today, three remain in existence, all of which are still on the railway. These are G.1, from the original 1873 batch; Gr.12 (the small "r" prefix denotes that it is ex-Manx Northern stock); and G.19, which was used for many years by the permanent way crews. G.19 is distinctive for being fitted with clamber boards for tree felling and having a small wood stove installed, which were removed for its display in the museum during 2013.

Nine of the class were sold for scrap in the infamous Ballasalla Bonfire of 1974, along with many other items of redundant non-passenger stock. In 2017, the Isle of Man Steam Railway Supporters' Association announced plans to fully restore the sole surviving 1873 vehicle, G.1, to service. All were painted in a variety of shades of grey with white lettering and tare loadings, often with black drop-shadow.

Key:	Restored	Scrapped	Preserved

No.	Built	Builder	Notes	Withdraw	Scrap
G.1	1873	Metropolitan Carriage & Wagon Co.	Restored I.o.M.S.R.S.A. 2019-2023	1990	~
G.2	1873	Metropolitan Carriage & Wagon Co.	No Details	1959	1964
G.3	1873	Metropolitan Carriage & Wagon Co.	"Ballasalla Bonfire"	1965	1975
G.4	1873	Metropolitan Carriage & Wagon Co.	"Ballasalla Bonfire"	1962	1974
G.5	1877	Ashbury Carriage & Iron Co., Ltd.	Vacuum-Piped Fitted (Between Railcars) 1962	1965	1974
G.6	1877	Ashbury Carriage & Iron Co., Ltd.	"Ballasalla Bonfire"	1960	1974
G.7	1879	Metropolitan Carriage & Wagon Co.	"Ballasalla Bonfire"	1960	1974
G.8	1879	Metropolitan Carriage & Wagon Co.	"Ballasalla Bonfire"	1964	1975
G.9	1879	Metropolitan Carriage & Wagon Co.	"Ballasalla Bonfire"	1963	1975
Gr.10	1879	Swansea Carriage & Wagon Co.	Ex-M.N.Ry. No.13, "Ballasalla Bonfire"	19??	1975
Gr.11	1879	Swansea Carriage & Wagon Co.	Ex-M.N.Ry. No.14 Destroyed (Arson)	1965	1973
Gr.12	1879	Swansea Carriage & Wagon Co.	Ex-M.N.Ry. No.15, Rebuilt 1998–1999	2021	~
Gr.13	1879	Swansea Carriage & Wagon Co.	Ex-M.N.Ry. No.16, Disposal Detail Not Recorded	19??	19??
Gr.14	1897	Manx Northern Railway Co., Ltd.	Ex-M.N.Ry. No.32, Scrapped "Ballasalla Bonfire"	19??	1974
G.15	1915	Isle of Man Railway Co., Ltd.	Frames Ex Four-Wheeler B.19 – "Ballasalla Bonfire"	1964	1974
G.16	1915	Isle of Man Railway Co., Ltd.	Frames Ex Four-Wheeler C.11 – "Ballasalla Bonfire"	19??	1974
G.17	1916	Isle of Man Railway Co., Ltd.	Frames Ex-Bolster L.5 – "Ballasalla Bonfire"	1967	1975
G.18	1918	Isle of Man Railway Co., Ltd.	Frames Ex-Bolster L.6, Destroyed (Arson)	1965	1972
G.19	1921	Isle of Man Railway Co., Ltd.	Frames Ex-Van E.3 Railway Museum	1991	~

== "H" Three-Plank Wagons (1873–1925) ==
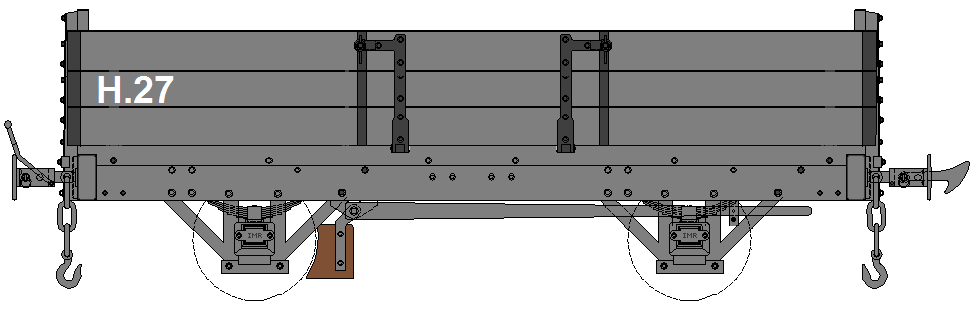
H.27, one of the three-plank wagons, built as M.N.Ry. No.1. Note the central dropping door and timber brake blocks.

Twenty of these 6-ton three-plank, center-door, open wagons were built for the opening of the Peel and Port Erin lines in 1873 and 1874. A dozen similar vehicles were delivered to the Manx Northern Railway when it opened in 1879, and further small batches brought the total to 46 by 1926. One of these wagons was used (with suitable side rails attached) to carry the military band to Peel on opening day in 1873.

The Isle of Man Steam Railway Supporters' Association built one of these from scratch in 2000. It has been given the number H.1 and has been through-piped for vacuum brakes to meet current safety regulations. This was the second project undertaken by the supporters, the first being the rebuilding of a ballast wagon, M.78. All carried a variety of shades of grey on timberwork with black metalwork as standard and fleet numbering on the sides in white, sometimes with black drop-shadow.

Key:	Restored	Scrapped

№	Built	Builder	Scrap	Notes
H.1-H.20	1873	Metropolitan Carriage & Wago	1928–1960	H.1 Rebuilt As Below
H.21-H.26	1877	Ashbury Carriage & Wagon Co.	1921–1962	Only Batch With Coil Springs Fitted
Hr.27-Hr.38	1879	Ashbury Carriage & Wagon Co.	1944–1963	Ex-Manx Northern Railway No.1 – No.12
Hr.39-Hr.45	1900	Swansea Carriage & Wagon Co.	1957–1962	Ex-Manx Northern Railway No.13, No.37 – No.42
Hr.46	1918	Isle of Man Railway Co., Ltd.	1953–1961	Using Frames Ex-Cattle Van K.15 (Above)
H.41 (ii)	1925	Isle of Man Railway Co., Ltd.	1962	Replacement – Original Damaged & Scrapped
H.1 (ii)	1998	I.o.M.S.R.S.A.	~	Rebuild – Extant Isle of Man Railway Museum

== "K" Cattle Vans (1873–1926) ==
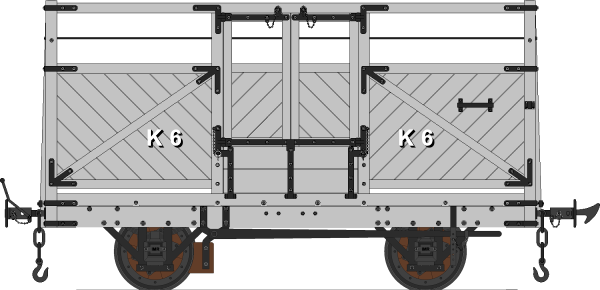
Unroofed K.6, built as the Manx Northern Railway's No.9 in 1879 and scrapped in 1963.

These were cattle-carrying wagons, ostensibly similar to the "G" class, but rather than being completely sealed, the top quarter of them was ventilated and featured horizontal rails where the "G" vans had only ventilated slots. The first batch was delivered for the opening of the Peel Line in 1873, with some early versions being delivered roofless. K.10, K.11, and K.12 were built for the Manx Mining Company and were converted in 1916 from 'M' series (M.45, M.43, and M.44 respectively).

None survive today, but it has been suggested that the Isle of Man Steam Railway Supporters' Association may reconstruct one of these for historical purposes, so the railway ultimately has an example of each type of stock in their possession. The standard livery was pale grey, later a deeper shade, with black metalwork and fleet detailing in white, shadowed.

No.	Built	Builders	Scrap	Notes
K.1 – K.2	1873	Metropolitan Carriage & Wagon	1921	Both Remained Unroofed, K.1 Chassis to H.41
K.3 – K.4	1877	Ashbury Railway Carriage & Iron	1965	K.3 Roofed 1924 / K.4 Remained Unroofed & Scrapped 1946
Kr.5 – Kr.7	1879	Swansea Carriage & Wagon Co.	1963	Ex-M.N.Ry. No.7-No.9 / Kr.6 Roofed 1916, Kr.5 Scrapped 1924
K.5 (ii)	1899	Isle of Man Railway Co., Ltd.	1961	Chassis Ex-Brake Van E.7 – Replacement
K.8 – K.9	1899	Metropolitan Carriage & Wagon	1960	Roofed 1916 & 1927 Respectively
K.10 – K.12	1908	Isle of Man Railway Co., Ltd.	1961	All Roofed 1916 – K.10 Scrapped 1947, K.11 in 1946
K.13 – K.14	1912	Isle of Man Railway Co., Ltd.	1927	Ex-B.12 & C.5, Became K.13A in 1924 & K.14A in 1925
K.15 – K.16	1912	Isle of Man Railway Co., Ltd.	1947	Chassis Ex-B.5 & B.16
K.17 – K.18	1914	Isle of Man Railway Co., Ltd.	19??	No Portholes, Chassis Ex-B.2 & C.6
K.19 – K.20	1920	Isle of Man Railway Co., Ltd.	1965	Chassis Ex-B.20 & B.21, K.19 Scrapped 1960
K.21 – K.23	1921	Isle of Man Railway Co., Ltd.	1962	Chassis Ex-B.11, B.15, B.4
K.24 – K.26	1923	Isle of Man Railway Co., Ltd.	1964	Chassis Ex-B.17, B.13, B.24
K.13-K.14 (ii)	1924	Isle of Man Railway Co., Ltd.	1964	Chassis Ex B.12 & C.5 – Replacements, K.13 Scrapped 1949
K.1-K.2 (ii)	1926	Isle of Man Railway Co., Ltd.	1962	Chassis Ex-C.11 & B.6 – Replacements

== "L" Bolster Wagons (1874–1910) ==
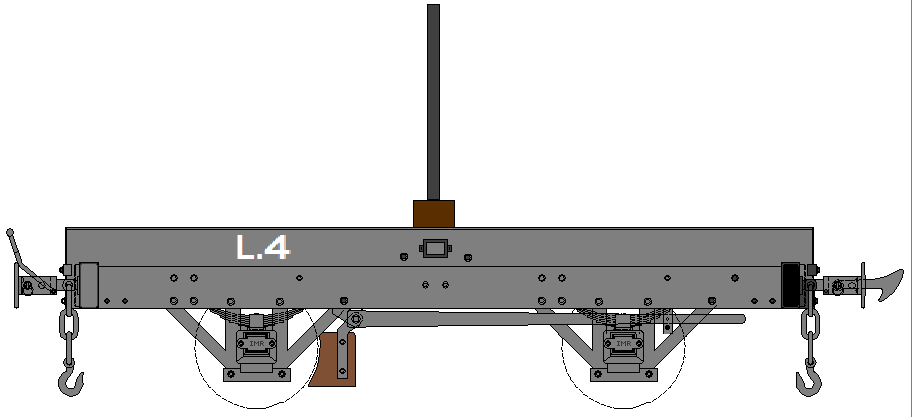
Bolster wagon L.4 dated from the opening of the south line in 1874 and was one of four identical vehicles initially delivered.

The railway had six of these four-wheel vehicles, which were used to carry long loads, commonly in pairs. Each had manual parking brakes, and they survived until the final years of the railway, though they were largely out of use in later years. All had a grey livery on the woodwork and black metal and frames, with numbering along their edges.

No.	Built	Builder	Notes	Scrap
L.1 – L.2	1874	Metropolitan Carriage & Wagon Co.		1975
L.3 – L.4	1874	Metropolitan Carriage & Wagon Co.		1959
L.5 – L.6	1910	Isle of Man Railway Co., Ltd.	Rebuilt, G.17 & G.18	~

== "M" Two-Plank Wagons (1877–1926) ==
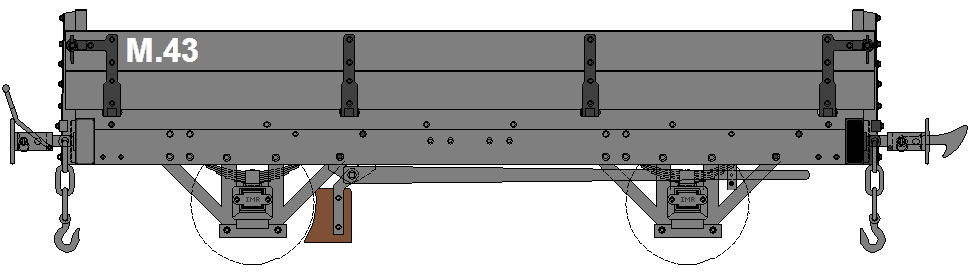
M.43, one of the two-plank drop-side wagons from the 1911 batch of twelve identical vehicles, all scrapped between 1955 and 1969.

Two-plank, drop-sided wagons, broadly similar to the "H" class, were intended as ballast wagons. However, their ease of loading and unloading made them useful for many types of goods traffic, eventually totaling 78 of these wagons on the line. Three were leased as private owner wagons to the Mona Chemical Company in Peel. Other private owner wagons possibly existed. At least six were still serviceable in 1975, and a couple survived into nationalization. M.70 was resident on the old goods siding at Santon Station for many years. M.78 also survived, and it was this vehicle that inspired the Isle of Man Steam Railway Supporters' Association to restore it in 1998. The "rebuilt" wagon is now part of the railway's historic fleet of vehicles and bears plaques denoting its origins. It is coupled to H.1 as the Troublesome Trucks each September for the Friends of Thomas event. All carried a variety of shades of grey with black metalwork and fleet detailing on the sides in white, shadowed in black, though this was later dropped. The dismantling and scrapping of the remaining parts of M.69 in October 2025 leave the sole remaining example as preserved M.78.

Key:	Restored	Scrapped

No.	Built	Builders	Notes	Scrapped
M.1 – M.4	1877	Ashbury Carriage & Wagon	Withdrawn 1955–1962	1960 – 1965
M.5 – M.7	1884	Ashbury Carriage & Wagon	Withdrawn 1960 – 1965	1959 – 1964
M.8 – M.19	1888	Ashbury Carriage & Wagon	Withdrawn 1955 – 1965	1944 – 1965
M.20 – M.27	1889	Metropolitan Carriage & Wagon	Withdrawn 1954 – 1967	1952 – 1965
Mr.28 – Mr.35	1884	Matthew Baird & Co., Ltd.	Manx Northern Railway No.22 – No.29	1958 – 1966
Mr.36 – Mr.42	1898	Manx Northern Railway Co.	Manx Northern Railway No.30 – No.36	1955 – 1964
M.43 – M.54	1911	Metropolitan Carriage & Wagon	Withdrawn 1955 – 1966	1955–1969
M.55 – M.60	1911	Metropolitan Carriage & Wagon	Withdrawn 1958 – 1965	1955 – 1969
M.61 – M.67	1925	Metropolitan Carriage & Wagon	M.55 Converted Oil Tanker 1967	1960 – 1975
M.68 – M.72	1926	Metropolitan Carriage & Wagon	Withdrawn 1952 – 1960 (Parts M.70 Remain)	1966 – 1978
M.73 – M.77	1925	Metropolitan Carriage & Wagon	Withdrawn 1949 – 1971	1962 – 1999
M.78	1925	I.o.M.S.R.S.A.	Rebuilt 1996 – 1998 – In Traffic	~

== Breakdown Cranes ==
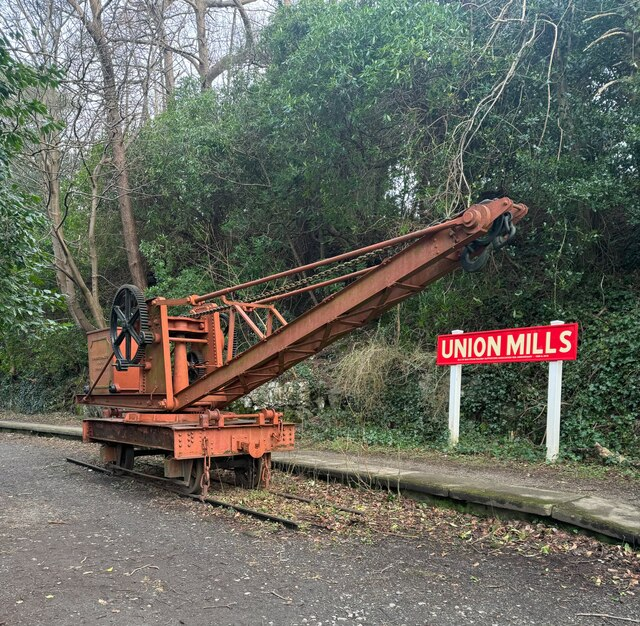
Crane No.2 Union Mills Station

The railway owned three cranes in total. The first crane was delivered in 1873, in preparation for the opening of the Peel Line and remained until after closure, with a second larger version, complete with its own match trucks following twenty years later and latterly operating as a complete breakdown train with the addition of an "E" series four-wheeled brake van lettered "Loco Dept.". A third crane was privately owned and restored, later converted for railway use and became self-propelled, although it was primarily used for demonstration purposes before being sold privately off-island briefly carrying the fleet number No.3. This crane featured a red and vermilion color scheme, while the other two were predominantly red oxide. Crane No.2 was displayed in burgundy at Ballasalla and Castletown for a period, removed from the latter location in 1991 for restoration and display on the former Union Mills Station site. Today, all lifting on the railway is performed by hired road cranes, especially during annual event galas when locomotives are turned.

No.	Built	Builder	Notes	Withdrawn	Scrap
№1	1873	Thomas Kiss & Co.	Delivered for the opening	19??	1969
№2	1893	Richard C. Gibbins & Co.	Extant, Union Mills Station	19??	~
№3	1902	Taylor & Hubbard	Sold privately off-island in 2001	2000	~

== "R" Bogie Runners ==
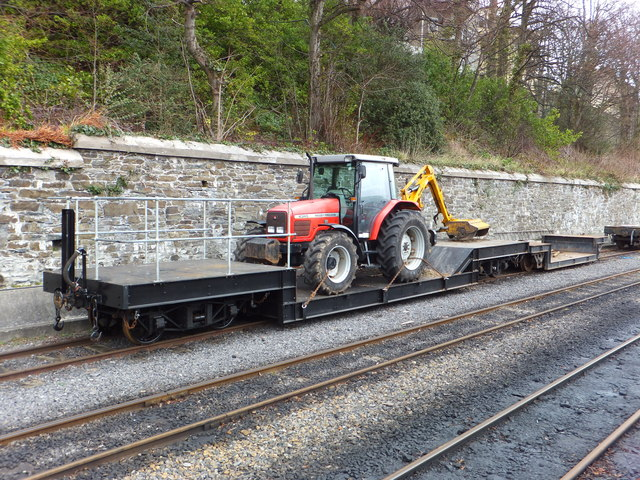
Bogie well No.3 stored at Douglas Station in the summer of 2018, the only vehicle of its kind.

In 1967, as part of a short-lived experiment to use the railway for shipping container traffic under the title "Man-Tainor" (alternatively "Isle of Man Ferry Express"), a new "R" series was created. This series used the underframes of former "Pairs" carriages, whose bodies were removed and dumped in the goods yards at St. John's Station (with F.69 similarly treated at Castletown Station). No stock carries this prefix today, as the frames were sold off in 1974 to the scrap dealer Manx Metals after the experiment ceased in 1968. The series letter and numbering were unofficial, applied by a party of visiting enthusiasts. The numbers were applied in the order the vehicles were found, not in order of their former "F" numbers. The exact correspondence between "R" and "F" numbers is not known. R.3 was converted to a rather unsatisfactory well wagon and was cut up by Manx Metals. The remaining ten were purchased from Manx Metals by the Festiniog Railway, where six have been used under new coaches and two as wagons. The final vehicle of the batch was experimentally converted into a bogie well wagon by crudely dropping the solebar sides, but this was not successful and was later scrapped.

No.	Was	Built	Builder	Notes	Sold To	Sale
R.1	F.53	1919	Metro Cammell	Stored, Ffestiniog Railway	Manx Metals, Onward Ffestiniog Railway	1974
R.2	F.60	1916	Metro Cammell	Now F.R. Waggon No.57	Manx Metals, Onward Ffestiniog Railway	1974
R.3	F.55	1912	Metro Cammell	Man-Tainor Traffic	Manx Metals, scrapped upon sale	1975
R.4	F.52	1912	Metro Cammell	Now F.R. Wagon No.56	Manx Metals, Onward Ffestiniog Railway	1974
R.5	F.58	1918	Metro Cammell	Now F.R. Carriage No.111	Manx Metals, Onward Ffestiniog Railway	1974
R.6	F.61	1910	Metro Cammell	Now F.R. Carriage No.118	Manx Metals, Onward Ffestiniog Railway	1974
R.7	F.56	1924	Metro Cammell	F.R. Carriage No.121 (scrapped)	Manx Metals, Onward Ffestiniog Railway	1974
R.8	F.72	1926	Metro Cammell	Now F.R. Carriage No.117	Manx Metals, Onward Ffestiniog Railway	1974
R.9	F.69	1923	Metro Cammell	Stored, Ffestiniog Railway	Manx Metals, Onward Ffestiniog Railway	1974
R.10	F.59	1920	Metro Cammell	Now F.R. Carriage No.119	Manx Metals, Onward Ffestiniog Railway	1975
R.11	F.51	1912	Metro Cammell	Now F.R. Carriage No.120	Manx Metals, Onward Ffestiniog Railway	1974
R.13	F.50	1925	Metro Cammell	Bogie Well Wagon	Manx Metals, Onward Ffestiniog Railway	1974

== Permanent Way ==
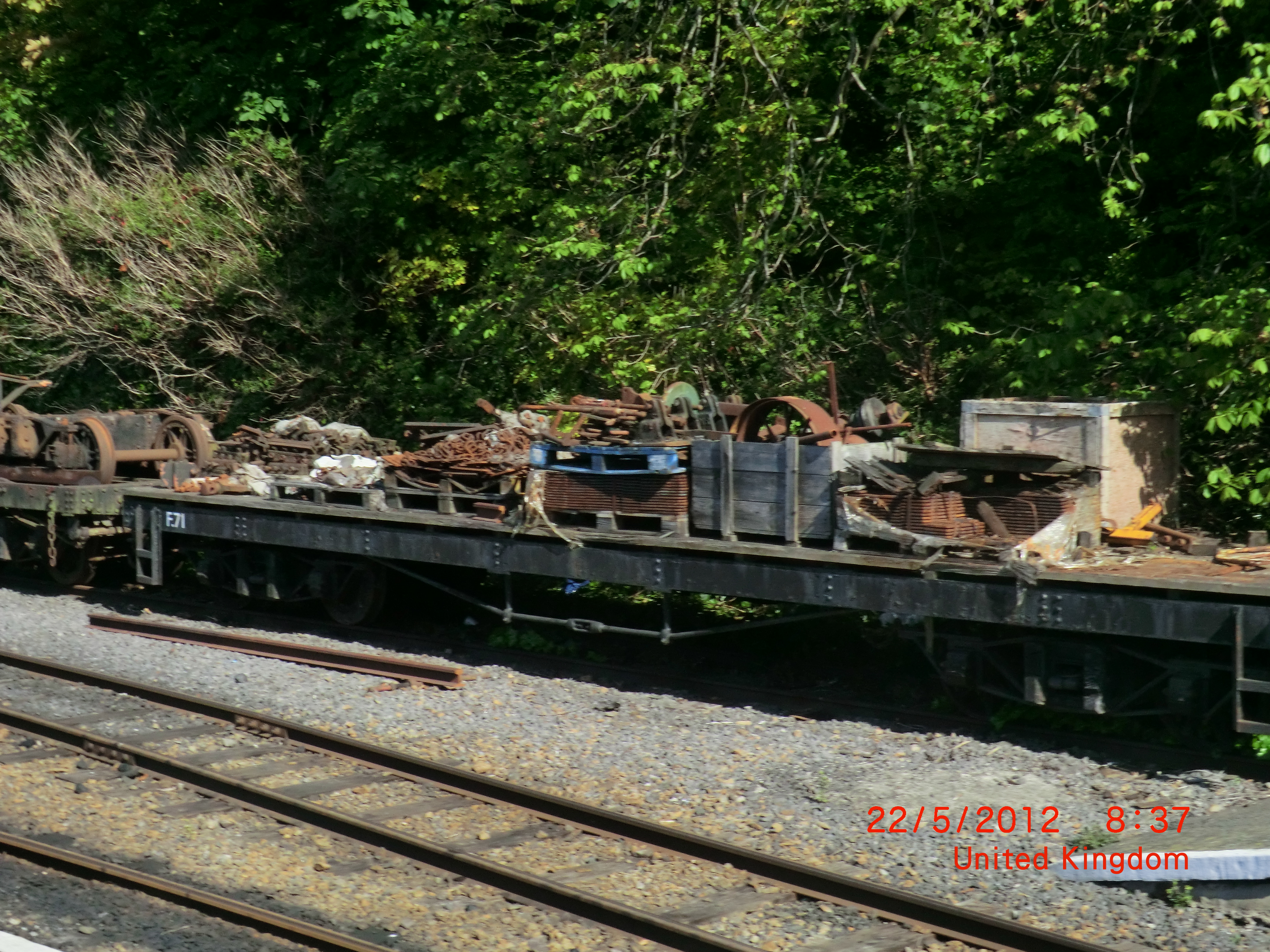
Runner F.71 stored at Douglas Station in 2012; it remains in departmental use today.

The railway still has a number of runners based on the underframes of former bogie carriages. These are mostly stored on the siding outside Douglas Station on the former Peel Line, which now acts as a stock siding. Today, these runners still carry their "F" class fleet numbers, either painted on or marked in chalk. In 1975, the underframes of F.65 and F.50 were briefly renumbered as part of another series, becoming R.12 and R.13, but they later reverted to their "F" numbers. F.65 was converted to become the first dual ballast hopper. Most of these surviving examples use frames from the "pairs" series (F.50-F.75), except for F.33, which was a bogie luggage van. All runners carry a plain black livery with white lettering on the solebars. Some examples are occasionally used during the Manx Heritage Transport Festival each summer as part of demonstration works' trains.

Key:	Scrapped	Dismantled	In Service

№	Built	Builder	Type	Notes	Status
F.23	1896	Brown, Marshall & Co	Bogie Runner	Timber Framed, Condemned 2009	Scrapped 2011
F.33	1905	Metro Cammell	Bogie Runner	Extant Douglas Works	Stripped & Scrapped 2025
F.44	1908	Metro Cammell	Bogie Runner	Condemned 2010	Scrapped 2013
F.57	1919	Metro Cammell	Bogie Runner	Extant "Peel East" Siding	Carries New Underframe
F.64	1912	Metro Cammell	Bogie Runner	Extant Douglas Works	Components' Storage
F.65	1910	Metro Cammell	Bogie Ballast Hoppers	Replaced (By F.70 Below)	Scrapped 2020
F.70	1922	Metro Cammell	Bogie Ballast Hoppers	Extant Douglas Works	In Service
F.71	1920	Metro Cammell	Bogie Runner	Extant Douglas Works	Scrapped 2024
F.73	1920	Metro Cammell	Bogie Runner	Extant Douglas Works	In Service
B.A.T.1	2009	Isle of Man Railway	Accommodation Truck	Extant Douglas Works	Dismantled 2015
W.W.1	1936	Isle of Man Railway	Four-Wheel Well Wagon	Replaced (Parts To W.W. No.2)	Dismantled, Scrapped 1998
W.W.2	1998	Isle of Man Railway	Four-Wheel Well Wagon	Extant Port Erin Station	In Service
W.W.3	2012	Isle of Man Railway	Bogie Well Wagon	Extant "Peel East" Siding	In Service

== Fish Wagons (1909–1914) ==
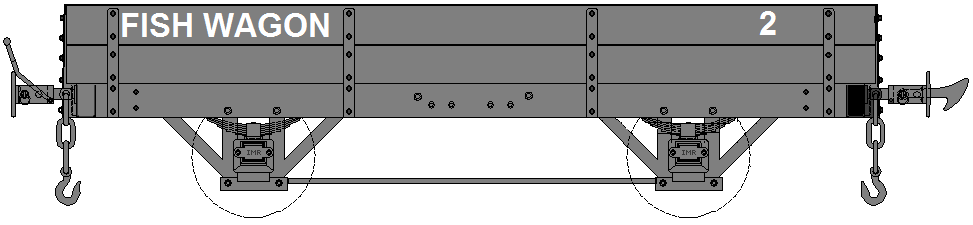
Fish Wagon constructed using the underframes of four-wheel carriage C.13, with the bodies later scrapped.

Five low-sided wagons were built on four-wheeled underframes released from coaches that had been placed on bogie underframes ("pairs"). These wagons were numbered in a separate sequence without a letter prefix. They did not survive into the nationalisation era, although some excellent photographs of them appear in various books dedicated to the railway's history and rolling stock. The wagons were labeled "Fish Wagon" on the left-hand side and carried their nominal fleet numbers on the right. All were painted deep grey with black metalwork.

№	Built	Builder	Frames	Scrap
№1	1909	Isle of Man Railway Co., Ltd., Douglas Works	Ex-A.9	1974
№2	1909	Isle of Man Railway Co., Ltd., Douglas Works	Ex-C.13	1962
№3	1910	Isle of Man Railway Co., Ltd., Douglas Works	Ex-E.4	1951
№4	1914	Isle of Man Railway Co., Ltd., Douglas Works	Ex-A.2	1965
№5	1914	Isle of Man Railway Co., Ltd., Douglas Works	Ex-C.2	1961

== Carriage Liveries ==
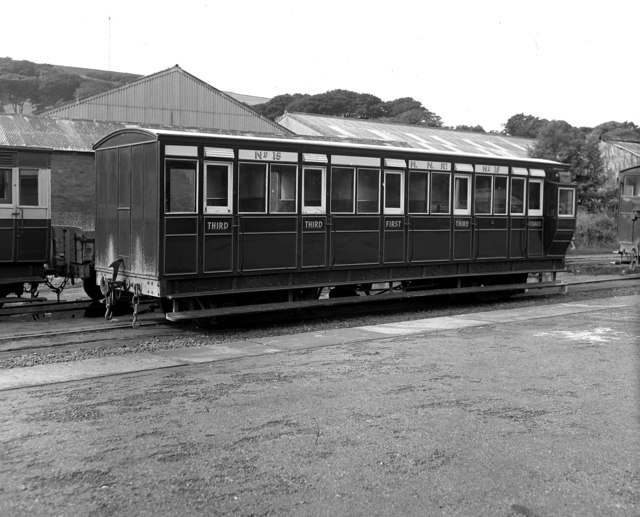
M.N.Ry. No.17 (the Foxdale Coach, later numbered as F.39) at Douglas Station in September 1979

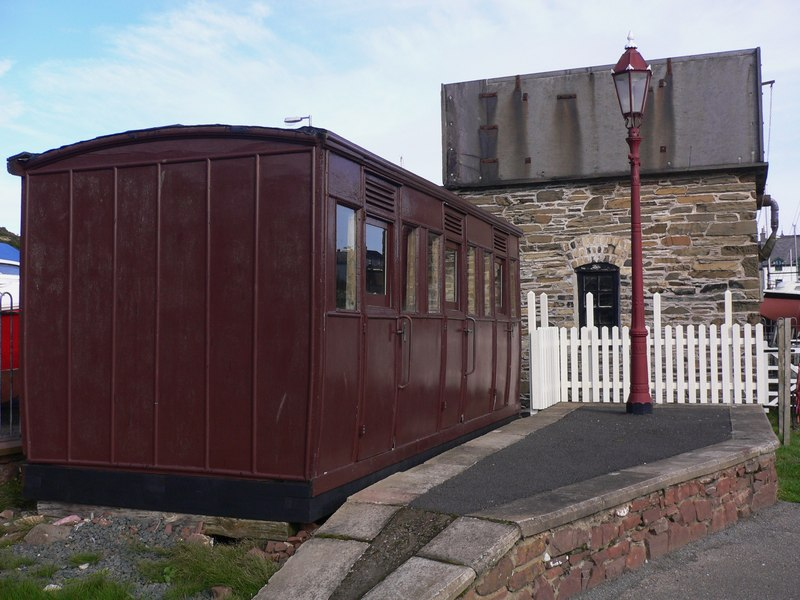
C.1 painted all-over brown on the site of Peel Station as part of a diorama display in July 2010

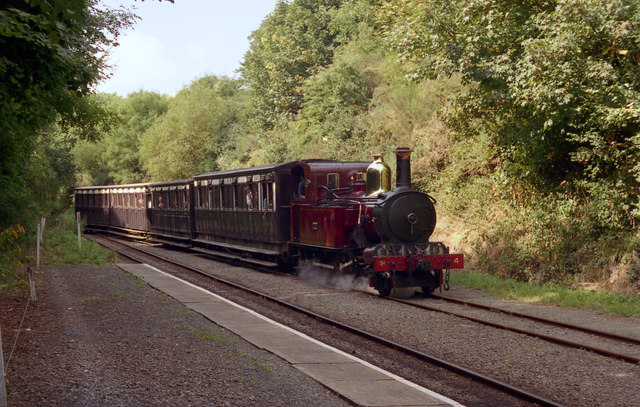
F.45, F.39, F.11 and F.26 in the then-standard purple lake scheme at Port Soderick Station with No.4 Loch in August 1995

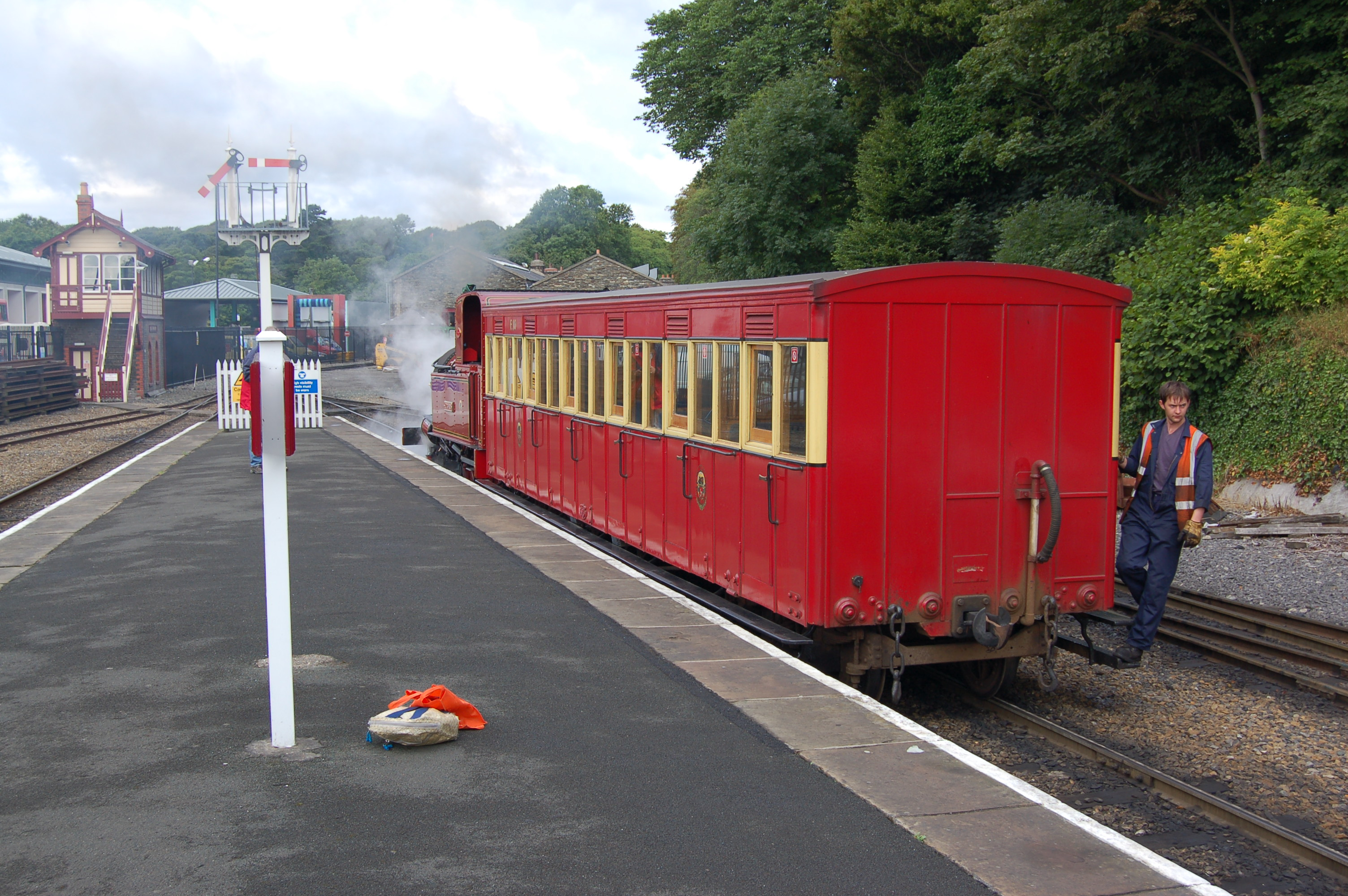
All-thirds carriage F.11 in red and cream at Douglas Station being marshalled onto a busy train in June 2006

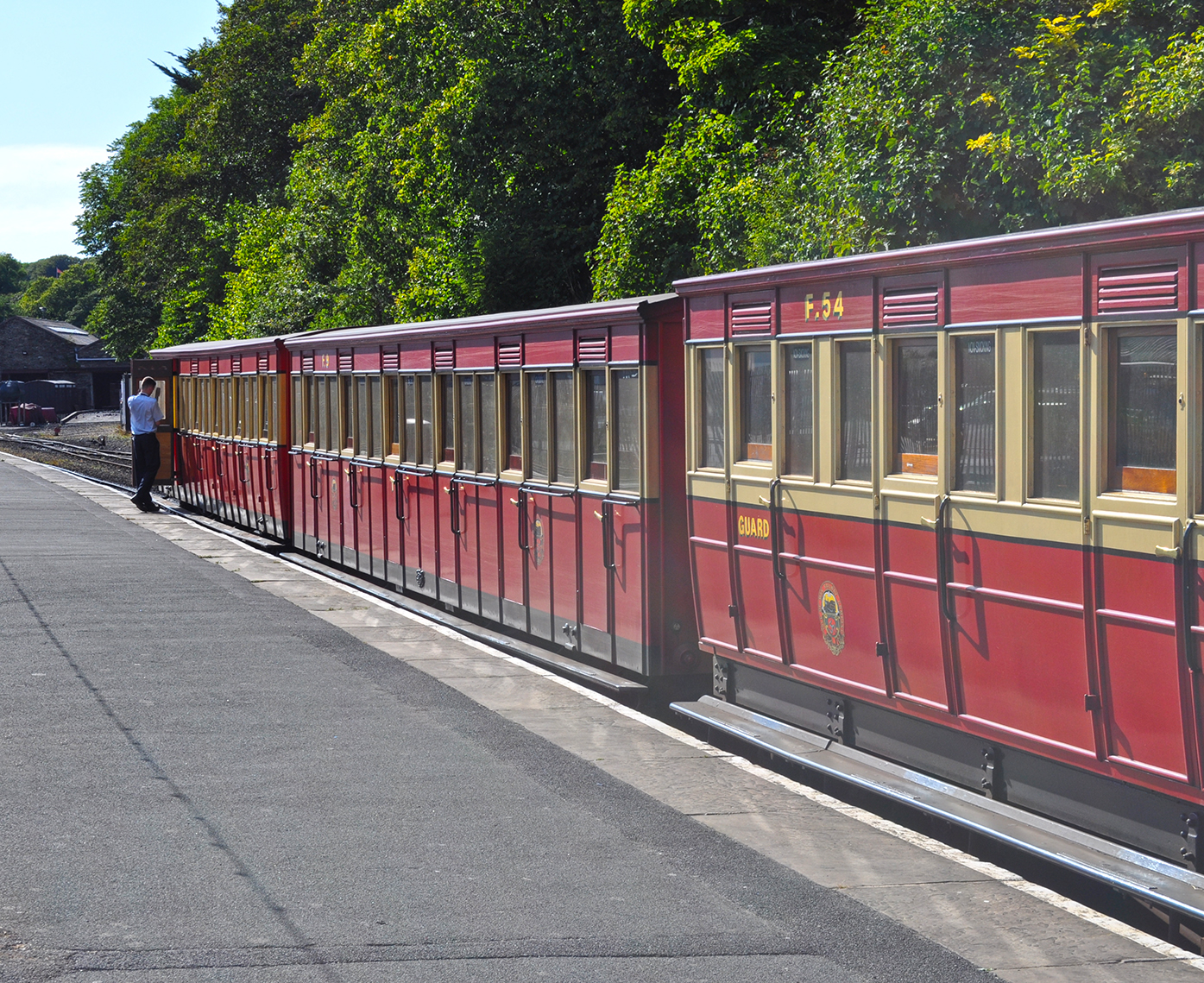
A typical rake consisting of F.18, F.26 and F.54 in red and cream at Douglas Station in May 2017

=== 1873–1885 Initial New Stock ===
Series "A" carriages had off-white upper panels, green lower panels, and yellow lining, except for A.12, the "Ducal Saloon," which had gilt lining and, according to some sources, was painted green. Series "B" to "E" were chocolate brown with yellow lining. From 1881, new Bogie Stock had chocolate brown lower panels and off-white upper panels, with gold lettering shaded in blue. A sole surviving door from one of the "E" series brake vans is extant in the works at Douglas and carries a faded and cracked brown/purple scheme with white droplight surrounds and vermilion/yellow beading detail. This was replicated in 2023 on saloon F.31.

=== 1879–1905 M.N.Ry. Only ===
The Cleminson six-wheel carriages were described as being "Polished Teak." This is the appearance that restored carriage No.6 has today, commonly on display in the railway's museum at Port Erin. From 1899, bogie stock on the Manx Northern (e.g., the Hurst Nelsons and the "Foxdale Coach") had "Chocolate lower and creamy white upper panels" prior to the amalgamation with the Railway Company. The teak finish did not weather well and was replaced with paint relatively early.

=== 1886–1934 Mixed Schemes ===
All passenger stock was now in bogie carriage livery (as above). From 1917, light brown upper window panels replaced off-white. The dark brown and tan livery now resembled that of the Lancashire & Yorkshire Railway. Certain stock in these colors lasted until the mid-1930s. From 1931, secondary carriage stock was painted in a utilitarian dark brown. New stock delivered during this period had white upper panels and lake lower panels, with vermilion and yellow lining.

=== 1935–1945 Utility Liveries ===
Most stock had off-white upper window and purple lake lower panels, similar to London and North Western Railway colors. The remainder was in Lancashire & Yorkshire Railway colors. From 1940, any repainting was done in dark brown. Some photographic images from the time appear to show a two-tone brown scheme, though records do not indicate whether this was the case. Images exist of some saloons and "pairs" that appear to show varying shades of brown in the mid-sections, similar to the post-war cream scheme.

=== 1946–1971 Post World War Two ===
Initially, carriages were painted all-over deep red. Later, they had deep red with off-white window panels. Older stock that had not been repainted was still all brown. Since 1968, all service carriages had cream (off-white) upper panels and red lower panels. One notable exception was the Foxdale Coach, which in 1968 was painted bright blue and yellow for use as Lord Ailsa's personal camping coach.

=== 1972–1978 Latter Railway Co. ===
The post-war scheme was retained, except for five saloons which, in 1972, were fitted with bus-style windows and an all-over bright red scheme (F.36 was not so treated but was repainted for the Royal Train that same year). The Foxdale Coach was painted into the standard red and cream scheme in 1978 and later restored.

=== 1979–1999 Post-Nationalisation ===
Upon nationalisation, many carriages were gradually returned to the purple lake livery, ending with F.45 in 1991. The "pairs" were outshopped in an all-over maroon scheme (with the notable exception of F.66). The last of these were withdrawn in this condition in 1987. The bar set of saloons (F.31, F.35, and F.32) received a red and white scheme in 1982, making them unique. This was changed to purple lake in 2001.

=== 2000–2024 Standardisation ===
Since 2000, all passenger stock has carried the post-war red and cream scheme, though with a notably brighter shade of red, as standard. In 2013, the Foxdale Coach (F.39) was restored to its 1887 condition with purple lake and off-white panelling, and gold/blue lining and lettering detail. In 2022, saloon F.31 reverted to this scheme, but with red/gold lining to emulate its original appearance. This will be followed by all other carriages in the dining train to achieve a uniform appearance. The other exception is the privately owned six-wheeler M.N.Ry. No.6, which is varnished teak with gold/blue lettering and shadow detail. All other carriages are red and cream as standard.

== See also ==
- Isle of Man Railway stations
- Isle of Man Railway locomotives
- Isle of Man Railway level crossings and points of interest
- Isle of Man Steam Railway Supporters' Association
