= Livonia (yacht) =

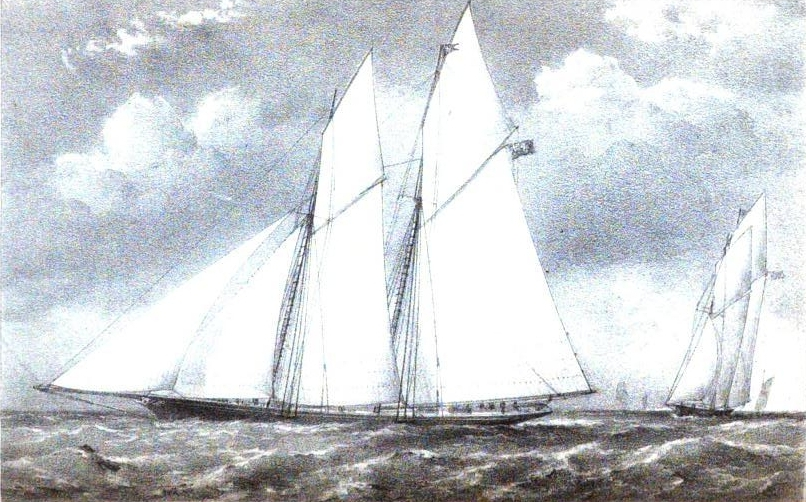
- Livonia, Lithograph by T.G.Dutton after A.W.Fowles
- Yacht club: Royal Harwich Yacht Club
- Nation: United Kingdom
- Builder: Michael Ratsey
- Launched: 6 April 1871
- Owner(s): James Lloyd Ashbury

Racing career
- America's Cup: 1871

Specifications
- Type: Monohull

Livonia was the second, unsuccessful, challenger attempting to lift the America's Cup from the New York Yacht Club.

== Design ==
Having unsuccessfully challenged for the America's Cup in Cambria in 1868, James Lloyd Ashbury again commissioned Michael Ratsey of Cowes to build a new yacht. Livonia was based on the lines of Sappho, and was launched on 6 April 1871. Ashbury took his new yacht across the Atlantic to once again challenge for the America's Cup, this time on behalf of the Royal Harwich Yacht Club.

== Career ==
The 1871 America's Cup race was involved in controversy. There was disagreement over the format of the competition, with Ashbury seeking legal advice. Eventually it was agreed that the first yacht to win four races would be the victor. Livonia was opposed by Franklin Osgood's Columbia. Columbia won the first two races, although Ashbury claimed the second on a technicality. Livonia won the third race with the Columbia being damaged. Sappho was chosen to replace the Columbia to continue the challenge and subsequently won the next two races and thus defended the cup for the New York Club.

Ashbury refused to accept the decision, claiming to have won two races to the Americans' three and declared that he would continue racing. As no challengers appeared he claimed the final two races and demanded the cup. He returned to the United Kingdom without the trophy accusing the New York Yacht Club of engaging in "unfair and unsportsmanlike proceedings". The club responded by returning a number of trophies he had donated in the previous year.

In July 1872, Livonia ran aground at Le Havre, Seine-Inférieure, France. She was refloated and taken in to Southampton, Hampshire, where she arrived on 15 July.
