= Sappho (yacht) =

Racing yacht, 1867–1887

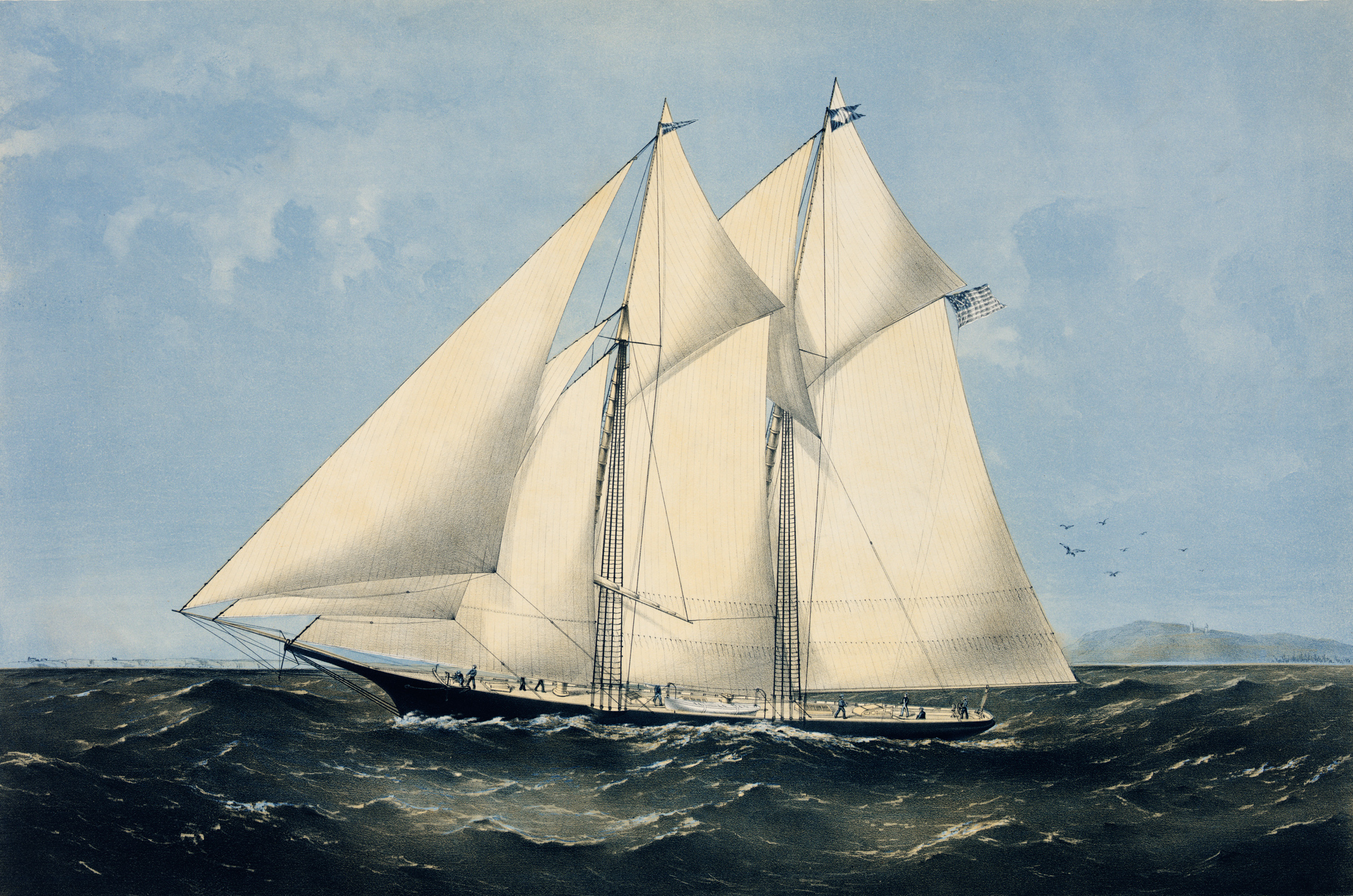
- Sappho leaving Sandy Hook July 28 1869, bound to Europe
- Yacht club: New York Yacht Club
- Nation: United States
- Builder: Cornelius & Richard Poillon Bros
- Launched: 1867
- Owner(s): William Proctor Douglas
- Fate: Scrapped at Cowes 1887

Racing career
- Skippers: Samuel Greenwood
- Notable victories: 1871 America's Cup (with Columbia)
- America's Cup: 1871

Specifications
- Type: Gaff schooner
- Length: 42 m (138 ft) (LOA); 36.40 m (119.4 ft) (LWL)
- Beam: 8.22 m (27.0 ft)
- Draft: 3.90 m (12.8 ft)
- Sail area: 1,170 m^{2} (12,600 sq ft)

Sappho was one of two defender yachts at the second America's Cup challenge, stepping in when defender Columbia was damaged in the third race.

== Design ==
Sappho was built by Cornelius & Richard Poillon Bros. on speculation for Richard Poillon to a design by William Townsend based on the lines of America.

== Career ==
Sappho was launched from the C. & R. Poillon shipyard at the foot of Bridge street, on May 25, 1867.

In 1868, Sappho sailed across the Atlantic to England. There she entered the Round the Isle of Wight Race. Competing against the yachts Aline, Cambria, Condor, and Oimara, Sappho finished last. Her poor showing encouraged Cambria's owner, James Lloyd Ashbury, to be the first to challenge the New York Yacht Club for the America's Cup.

Following her defeat, Sappho returned to the US where she was sold to New York Yacht Club member William Proctor Douglas. Douglas turned her over to Captain Robert "Bob" Fish who altered her hull, improved her ballast, and modified her rigging. The changes made her faster. In 1869 Sappho returned to England setting a record for the crossing of 12 days 9 hours 36 minutes.

On 15 April 1870. Sappho ran aground in Lymington Creek. She was refloated. In May 1870, Sappho won the race against Ashbury's English yacht Cambria. The Dauntless came in third place. Despite losing to Sappho, Ashbury took Cambria to America to challenge for the America's Cup. He lost to Magic.

Unsuccessful in his attempt to wrest the Cup from the New York Yacht Club in 1870, Ashbury tried again in 1871, this time with his yacht Livonia. The selected defender was Columbia. Columbia raced the first three races winning the first two and losing the third. Sappho raced the next two races winning both and retaining the America's Cup for the New York Yacht Club. On 7 September 1872, Sappho ran aground in the Solent 1.5 nautical miles (2.8 km) west of Ryde Pier, Isle of Wight.

Sappho was sold in 1876 to Prince Sciarra de Colonia who raced her in the French Riviera. Upon the prince's death, Sappho was acquired by George Marvin who sailed her until she was scrapped at Cowes in 1887.
