= Brown, Marshalls and Co. Ltd. =

British railway carriage building company

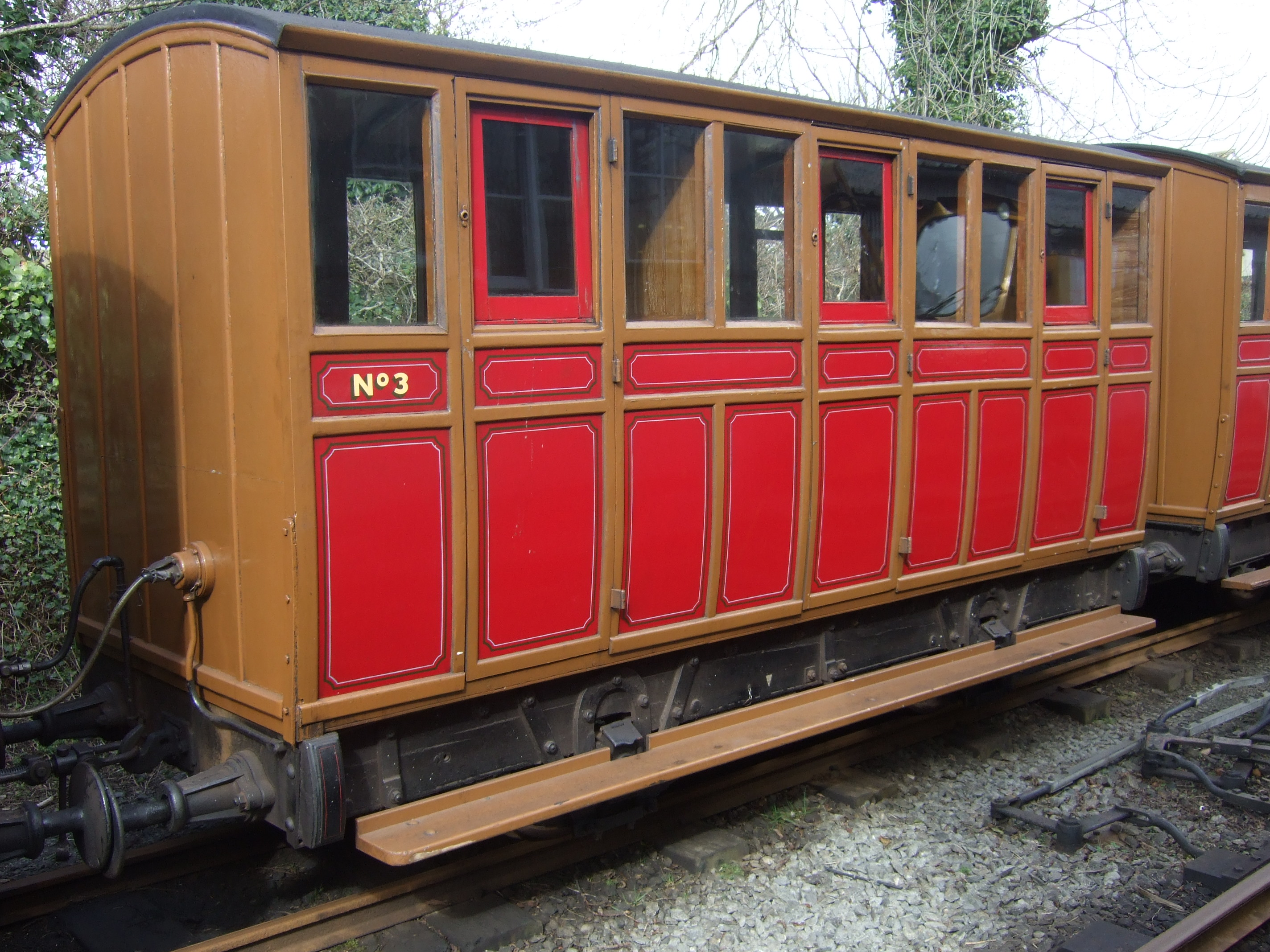
Talyllyn Railway carriage number 3, the earliest coach built for the railway in 1866.

Brown, Marshalls and Co. Ltd. was a company that built railway carriages, based in Saltley, Birmingham, England. It was formed in 1840.

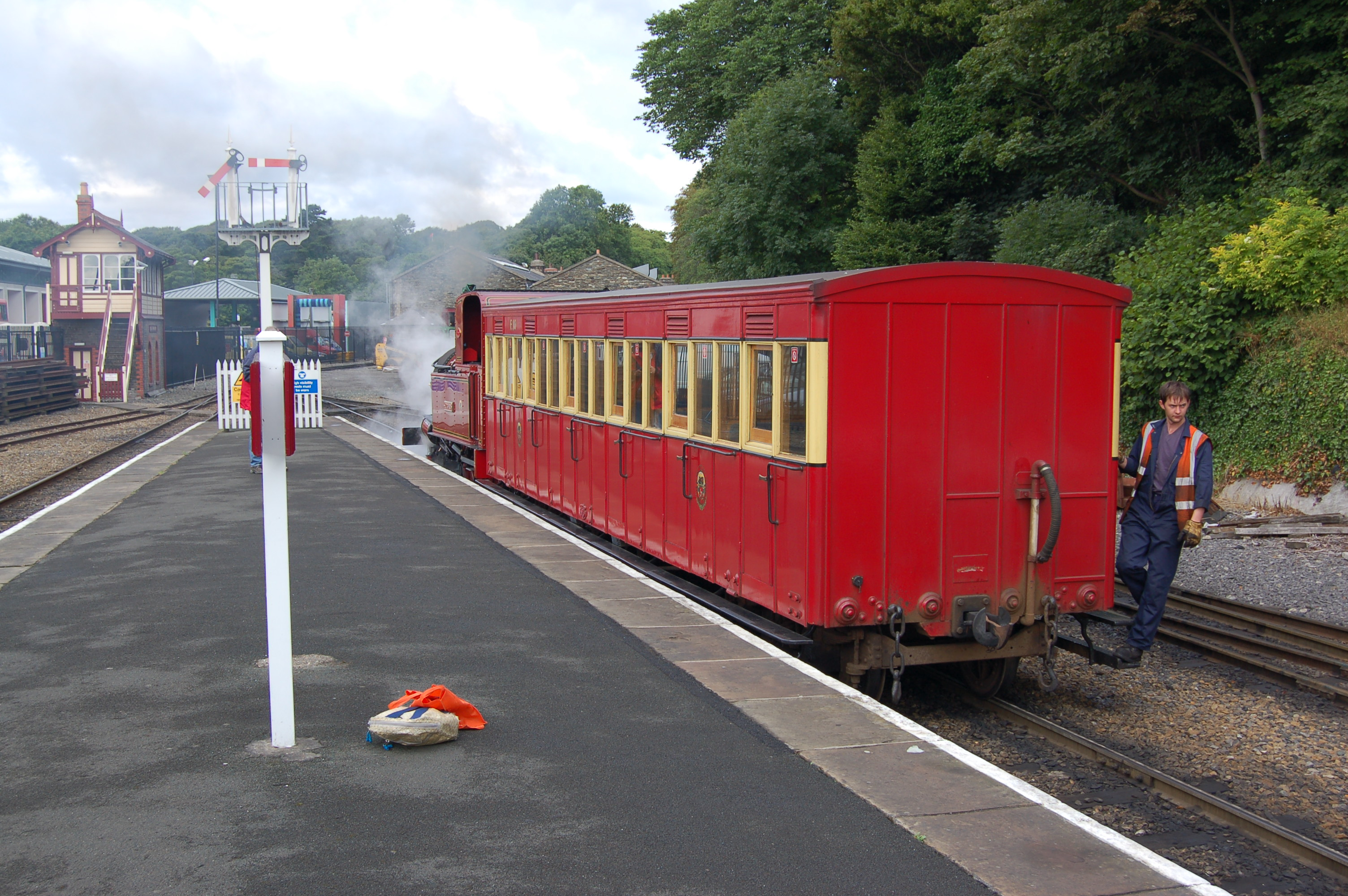
F.10 being shunted at Douglas Railway Station, in 2006 when in regular use.

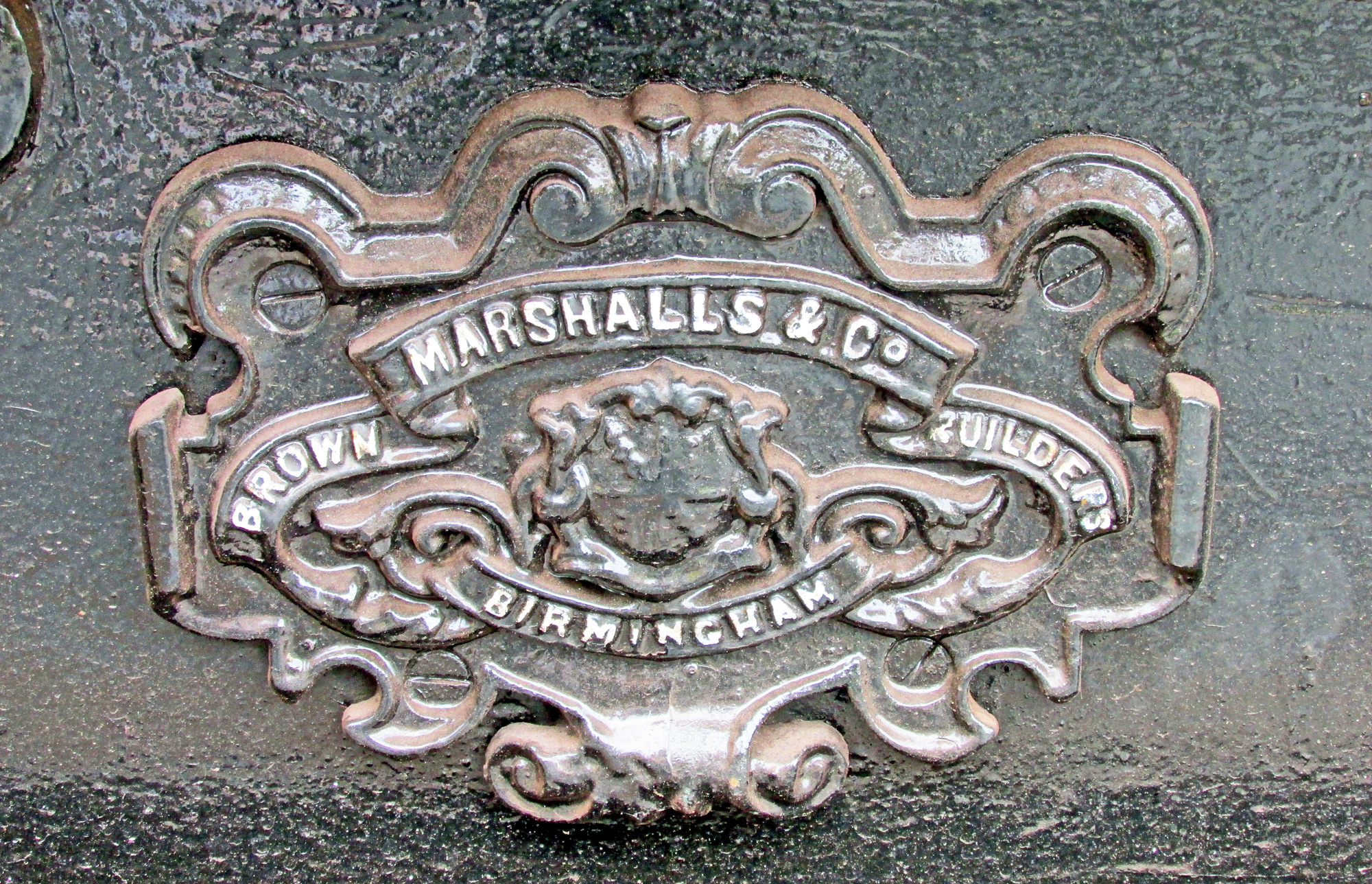
Brown Marshalls & Co builders plate on Talyllyn Railway coach No. 1 of 1866

== Talyllyn Railway ==
In 1866 it built the original batch of four-wheel coaches for the Talyllyn Railway, which are still in operational use

== Ffestiniog Railway ==
In 1873 built two bogie carriages for the Ffestiniog Railway. These were the first iron-framed bogie coaches in Great Britain. These are also still in regular use.

== Isle of Man Railway ==
Between 1876 and 1894 the company provided the Isle of Man Railway Company with a total of seventeen of their first bogie carriages of the "F" series (the exceptions being F.7 and F.8 which were supplied from the Ashbury Carriage & Wagon Co.). These composite carriages formed the main part of the operational fleet and several survive today with F.9, F.11, F.15 and F.18 in regular service, F.10 being restored and F.6 in private preservation by the Isle of Man Steam Railway Supporters' Association.

== Amalgamation ==
In 1902 it became part of the Metropolitan Amalgamated Railway Carriage & Wagon Company, which eventually formed part of Metro-Cammell - a company that continued to build rolling stock in Birmingham until 2005.
