= Cambria (yacht) =

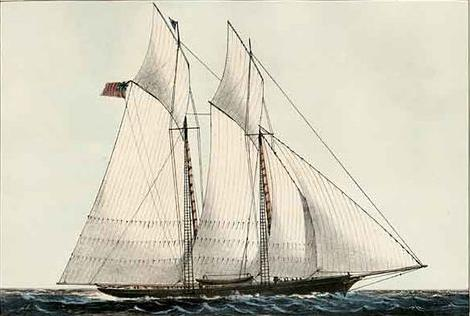
- Schooner yacht Cambria
- Yacht club: Royal Thames Yacht Club
- Nation: United Kingdom
- Builder: Michael Ratsey
- Owner(s): James Lloyd Ashbury

Racing career
- Notable victories: Great Ocean Race
- America's Cup: 1870

Specifications
- Type: Monohull

Cambria was the first, though unsuccessful, challenger attempting to lift the America's Cup from the New York Yacht Club.

== Design ==
In 1868, James Lloyd Ashbury commissioned Michael Ratsey of Cowes to build a 188-ton schooner, Cambria.

== Career ==
Cambria had a highly successful racing season in 1869, winning the Round the Isle of Wight Race.

Ashbury was encouraged by Cambria's success in the Isle of Wight race, particularly because the champion American schooner Sappho had finished last. In October 1868 Ashbury wrote to the New York Yacht Club offering to be the first challenger for the America's Cup. He subsequently exchanged letters with Gordon Bennett, sportsman and owner of the New York Herald, challenging him to a trans-Atlantic race, prior to competing for the cup on behalf of the Royal Thames Yacht Club.

In July 1870 Ashbury raced Cambria across the Atlantic Ocean from Ireland to New York in challenge against Bennett's yacht, Dauntless. Cambria won the race by arriving first off Sandy Hook lightship in 23 days 5 hours and 17 minutes; 1 hour 43 minutes ahead of Dauntless.

The race for the America's Cup was held on 8 August, with Cambria facing 14 yachts of the New York Yacht Club. The race was won by Magic, with Cambria finishing eighth.
