= Phyllis Rampton Narrow Gauge Railway Trust =

Welsh charitable organisation

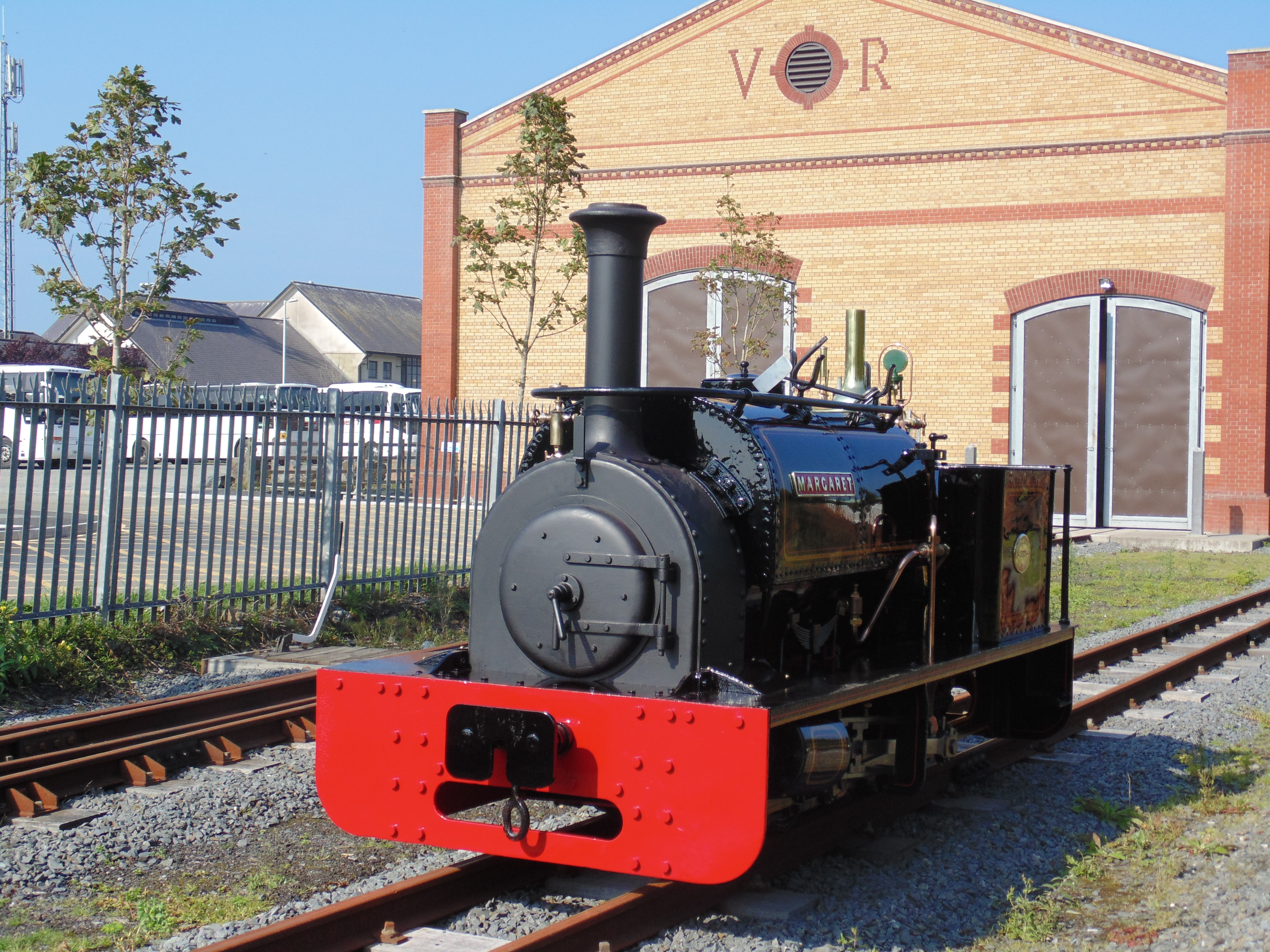
- Locomotive Margaret, owned by the Vale of Rheidol Railway outside the locomotive workshops in Aberystwyth
- Type: Charitable organisation
- Registration no.: 292240
- Location(s): England and Wales

The Phyllis Rampton Narrow Gauge Railway Trust is a British charity which is registered with the British Charity Commission as 292240 under the classification of "Education/Training Environment/Conservation/Heritage". The Trust is the 100% shareholder of the Vale of Rheidol Railway in Wales and was established to both protect the future of the railway and provide funds to build a museum at Aberystwyth station.

== Policy and objectives ==
The Trust's 2006 annual report states:

The objectives shall be to preserve, exhibit, display and loan for demonstration for the public benefit and for the advancement of technical, historical and general education, steam and other railway locomotives, rolling stock, equipment, machines and relics which are historical, operational and of general interest and in addition are of educational value. The objective of the charity is also the preservation, maintenance and promotion of narrow gauge railways.

== Vale of Rheidol Locomotive Workshop ==
In June 2010 the trust provided £600,000 towards building a new restoration workshop at Aberystwyth. The workshop building, completed in 2014 is a major asset to the railway and now employs a number of skilled craftsmen and apprentices. The workshop has completed the restoration of a number of locomotives as well as carrying out maintenance of the Vale of Rheidol fleet. The workshop regularly holds open days.

== Collection of locomotives ==
The Vale of Rheidol Railway owns an extensive collection of locomotives known as the Vale of Rheidol Museum Collection. Several of these locomotives are on public display in the Engine Shed exhibition hall at Aberystwyth station.

== See also ==
- Vale of Rheidol Railway
- List of Vale of Rheidol Railway rolling stock
