= James Lloyd Ashbury =

British politician

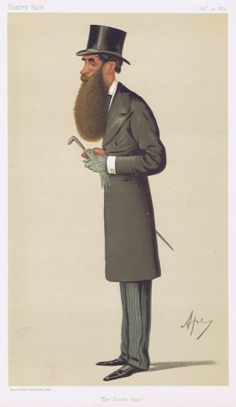
"The Ocean Race": caricature of James Lloyd Ashbury by Carlo Pellegrini

James Lloyd Ashbury (1834 – 3 September 1895) was a British yachtsman and Conservative Party politician.

In 1866, Ashbury inherited a leading position in the family company Ashbury Railway Carriage and Iron Company Ltd and a considerable fortune from his father. Moving away from Manchester for health reasons, he took up sailing and competitive yachting as sports activities. He served a single term in the House of Commons, losing his seat in the general election in 1880. Following the failure of his business interests and the mismanagement of his sheep station in New Zealand, Ashbury faced bankruptcy and disappeared into obscurity. In September 1895, he committed suicide with an overdose of chlorodyne.

== Early life ==
The son of John Ashbury, founder of the Ashbury Railway Carriage and Iron Company Ltd of Manchester, James trained as an engineer and joined the family company. When his father died in 1866 he inherited the business and a considerable fortune. His health was affected by the polluted atmosphere of Manchester, and Ashbury moved to the coast, where he took up sailing. As he attempted to advance in society he took up competitive yachting.

== The America's Cup challenges ==
Ashbury was appointed commodore of the Royal Harwich Yacht Club in 1870, having been elected a member in 1867.

He made the first two, albeit unsuccessful challenges for the America's Cup, held since 1851 by the New York Yacht Club. Ashbury's first challenge was in 1870 with his yacht Cambria. The race for the America's Cup was held on 8 August, and Cambria faced 14 yachts of the New York Yacht Club. The race was won by the Magic, with the Cambria finishing in eighth place. Ashbury stayed on to take part in the club cruise, and entertained the President of the United States, Ulysses S. Grant on his yacht.

Returning to England, Ashbury commissioned a new yacht Livonia. Ashbury took his new yacht across the Atlantic to once again challenge for the America's Cup, this time on behalf of the Royal Harwich Yacht Club. Controversial from the start, Livonia was defeated 4–1. He returned to the United Kingdom without the trophy accusing the New York Club of engaging in "unfair and unsportsmanlike proceedings". The club responded by returning a number of trophies he had donated in the previous year. Although the event ended in acrimony, Ashbury was the catalyst for the introduction of greater fairness in no longer allowing the defender to use multiple yachts against a single challenger, and was belatedly inducted into the America's Cup Hall of Fame in 1997.

== Member of parliament for Brighton ==
By the 1860s Ashbury was living in Brighton. When a general election was called in 1868, he put himself forward as a parliamentary candidate, claiming to be responding to an "extensively signed requisition". He was adopted as candidate by the Conservative Party, pledging to give "general but independent support" to the government of Disraeli. He called for "reform not revolution" and the provision of education for every man, woman and child. He failed to be elected, with the Liberals holding both Brighton seats.

He was again a candidate at the next general election in 1874 and on this occasion he was elected along with his fellow Conservative, Major-General Charles Cameron Shute. He was only to serve a single term in the House of Commons as the Liberals regained the two Brighton seats at the next general election in 1880.

== Later life and death ==
Following the loss of his parliamentary seat, Ashbury pursued his business interests, which rapidly failed. He purchased a large sheep station on the South Island of New Zealand, but due to mismanagement it became a major financial liability. He was unable to pay creditors and spent many years in the courts, eventually facing bankruptcy.

Ashbury disappeared into obscurity. The newspapers of September 1895 reported that the body of an elderly "gentleman of no occupation" known as James Ashbury had been found in his London lodgings, having apparently taken his life with an overdose of chlorodyne. It was several days before his identity emerged. He was buried in Kensal Green Cemetery.

Parliament of the United Kingdom
Preceded by Henry Fawcett and James White	Member of Parliament for Brighton; 1874–1880; With: Charles Cameron Shute	Succeeded by John Robert Hollond and William Thackeray Marriott
