= Royal Harwich Yacht Club =

Sailing club in Woolverstone, England

- Burgee

- Ensign
- Short name: RHYC
- Founded: 1845; 181 years ago
- Location: Woolverstone, Suffolk, England
- Commodore: Mark Dean
- Website: www.royalharwichyachtclub.co.uk

The Royal Harwich Yacht Club is a UK sports club for sailing and other waterborne leisure activities. The Club’s objectives are to promote, encourage and facilitate: sailing, motor-boating and other water-based activities; training; racing in all sailing craft; and social activities for Club members, visiting sailors and guests.

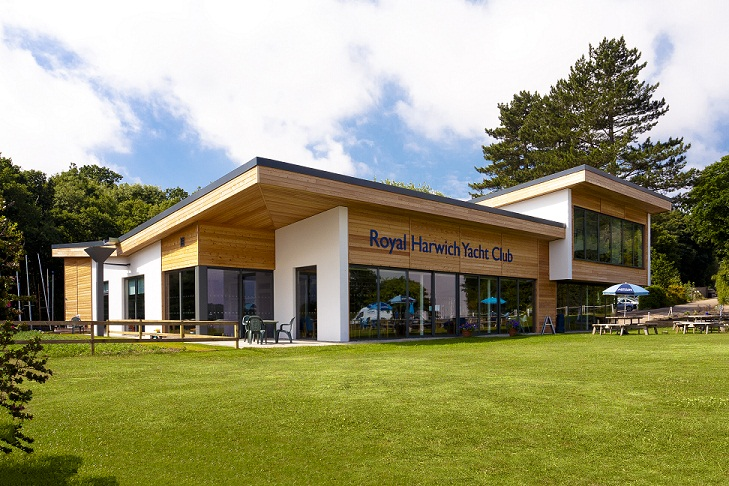
The RHYC Club House

== History ==
=== Founding and early history ===
Annual regattas at Harwich providing racing events for both yachts and working boats had been organised since 1828 when, in 1843, a yacht club was formed to run them. The so-called Eastern Yacht Club carried on for the next two years running these annual events. In 1845 its Rear Commodore, William Knight arranged for Royal Patronage, securing the Dowager Queen Adelaide (King William IV's widow) as patron.

The club was renamed the Royal Harwich Yacht Club and an Admiralty Warrant was also obtained giving its sailing members significant privileges in the form of mooring rights, exemption from lightage fees and free pratique in various foreign ports. Ready-built premises existed on the seafront at Harwich in the form of the Baths and Club Room which overlooked the harbour entrance.

From the latter half of the 19th century until 1939, the club had no permanent premises since the old club rooms had been demolished in the expansion of the Navy Yard at Harwich. Various Harwich hotels had been used as RHYC headquarters, in particular the Great Eastern Hotel. During the World War 2, the Royal Harwich completely closed down and all club valuables, archives and papers were stored at the Great Eastern Hotel during the war. After the war, the club moved to its current position near the village of Woolverstone, some five miles up the River Orwell from Harwich. Club Archives for the years 1845 to 2005 are held at the Suffolk Archive.

=== Royal patrons ===
- HM Queen Adelaide 1845 to 1847
- HM Queen Victoria 1847 to 1901
- HRH The Prince Albert The Prince Consort 1847 to 1861
- HM King George V 1911 to 1936 (Commodore for 15 years as Duke of York and Prince of Wales 1895 to 1910)
- HM King George VI 1936 to 1952
- HRH The Prince Philip, Duke of Edinburgh, KG, KT. OM. GBE. 1952 to 2021

=== Polar exploration ===
After repeated Admiralty attempts to discover the fate of Sir John Franklin's lost expedition to the North West Passage, his widow commissioned a private expedition in 1857. Under the command of Captain Mclintock the steam yacht “Fox” was despatched to the Arctic wearing Royal Harwich Yacht Club colours, although two-year expedition failed to discover the exact fate of Franklin. The Royal Harwich ensign was also used in the following polar expeditions: Captain Nares to the North in the 1880s, Prince Luigi di Savoia to the North in 1898, Scott's Discovery Expedition to the South in 1900, and the Norwegian-British-Swedish expedition of 1949.

=== James Ashbury America's Cup Challenge ===
James Lloyd Ashbury, who was appointed as Commodore of the Royal Harwich Yacht Club in 1869 challenged (unsuccessfully) for the America's Cup in 1870 and 1871. The club website asserts that whilst the first of these challenges was under the flag of the Royal Thames Yacht Club, the second challenge in 1871 was under the flag of the Royal Harwich Yacht Club.

== Facilities ==
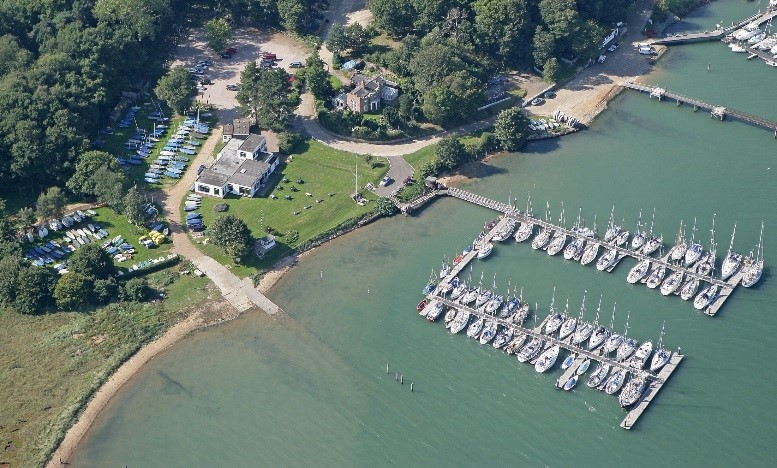
Aerial view of the RHYC, with the old club house building (Pre 2013)

The Club House, located on Marina Road, Woolverstone, offers facilities including:

- Bar and catering
- Function rooms
- Changing facilities
- Club office
- Training room
- A small Library

Sailing facilities include:

- Dinghy park
- Slipway for small craft launching
- Marina providing berthing for yachts

== Sailing ==
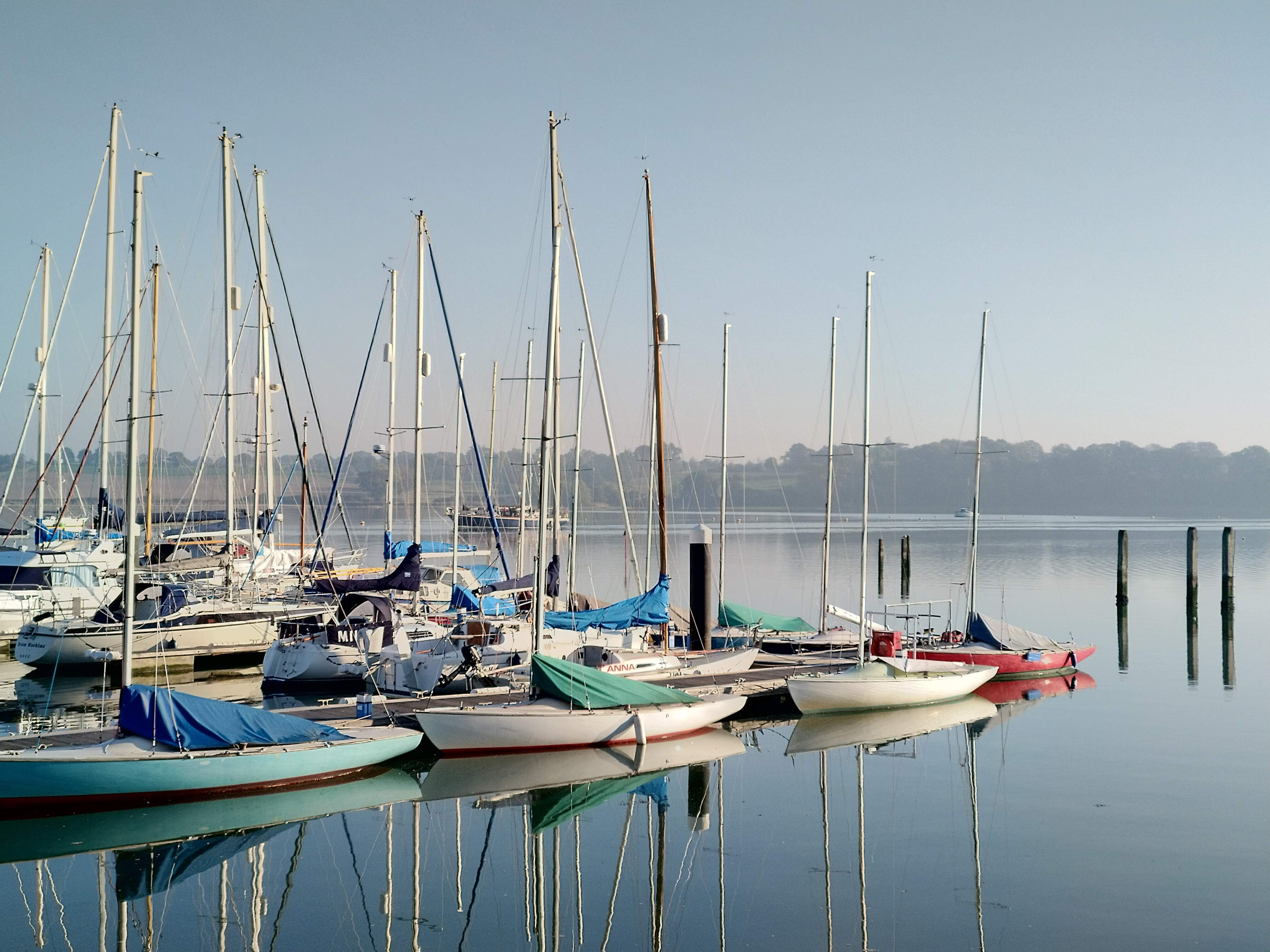
Ajax 23 One-Designs in the marina at RHYC

Sailing and Racing at the club include:

- Junior racing in dinghies, including Optimists, Toppers, RS Teras and RS Fevas
- Laser racing
- Mixed (Handicap) Dinghy racing
- Ajax 23 One-Design racing
- Cruising yachts and Cruiser Racing

The club also host Open Event races for various classes of dinghy.

== Training ==
The club is affiliated to the RYA and is an RYA British Youth Sailing Recognised Club

The club runs a variety of RYA accredited training courses for both Adults and Juniors
