= Ashbury Railway Carriage and Iron Company Ltd =

British rolling stock manufacturer

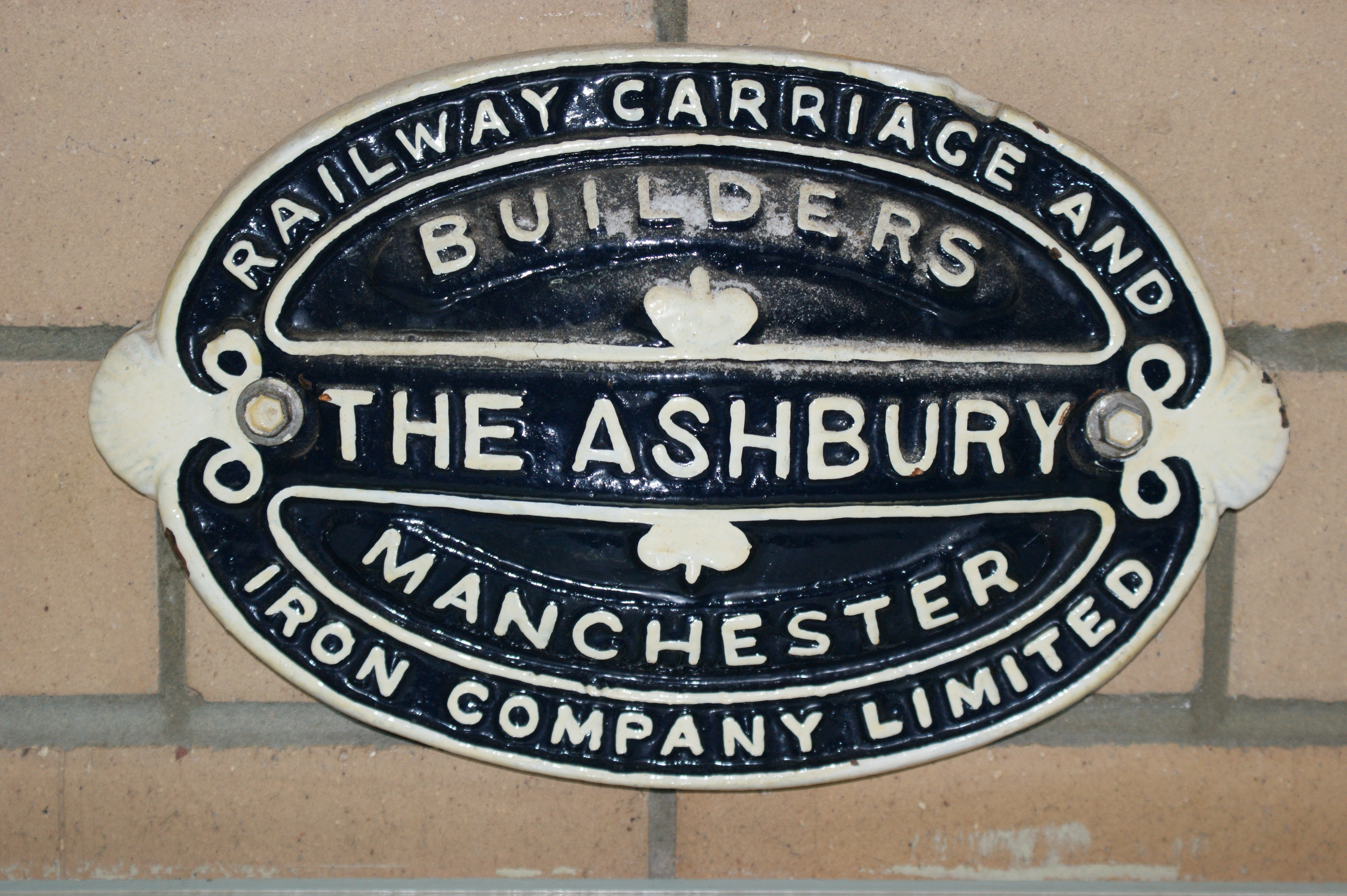
Ashbury makers plate

The Ashbury Carriage and Iron Company Limited was a manufacturer of railway rolling stock founded by John Ashbury in 1837 in Commercial Street, Knott Mill in Manchester, England, near the original terminus of the Sheffield, Ashton-under-Lyne and Manchester Railway. It moved to Ashton Old Road, Openshaw in 1841 and became a limited company in 1862 as The Ashbury Railway Carriage and Iron Company Limited. Ashburys railway station is named after the company in this location. After the founder's death in 1866, the company was owned by his son, James Lloyd Ashbury. In 1898 the works covered about 20 acres (8.1 ha) and employed about 1,700.

== Later history ==
In 1902 the business was transferred to Saltley in Birmingham when it merged with Ashbury, Brown and Marshalls. This was absorbed into the Metropolitan Amalgamated Railway Carriage & Wagon Company, which later became the Metropolitan-Cammell Carriage & Wagon Co.

Examples of its rolling stock survive to this day on preserved railways all over the world. The company name was revived in 2004 by the Welsh Highland Heritage Railway in North Wales to recreate some of the carriages that it built. That company was dissolved in 2022.

== See also ==
- Ashbury Rly Carriage and Iron Co Ltd v Riche, a well known UK company law case

== Other references ==
- London Underground 1900/1903 Stock
