= Isle of Man Railway No.1 Sutherland =

1873 steam locomotive

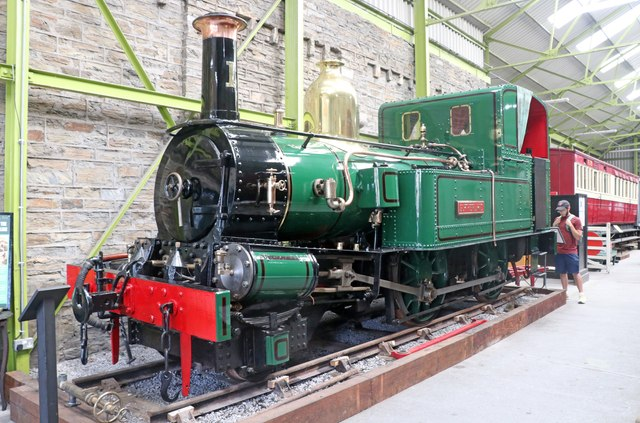
Type and origin
- Power type: Steam
- Builder: Beyer, Peacock & Company
- Serial number: B.P.1253
- Build date: 1873
Specifications
- Configuration
  - Whyte: 2-4-0T
- Gauge: 3ft (914 mm)
Career
- Withdrawn: 1921-1923 (Reboiler); 1964-1998 (Stored); 2003-Date (Displayed)
- Current owner: Isle of Man Railway

Isle of Man Railway No.1 Sutherland is a 2-4-0T steam locomotive built in 1873 for the Isle of Man Railway (IMR) by Beyer, Peacock & Company.

== History ==
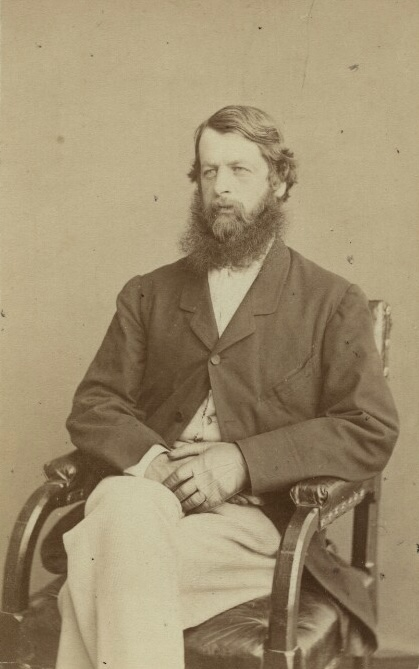
George Sutherland-Leveson-Gower

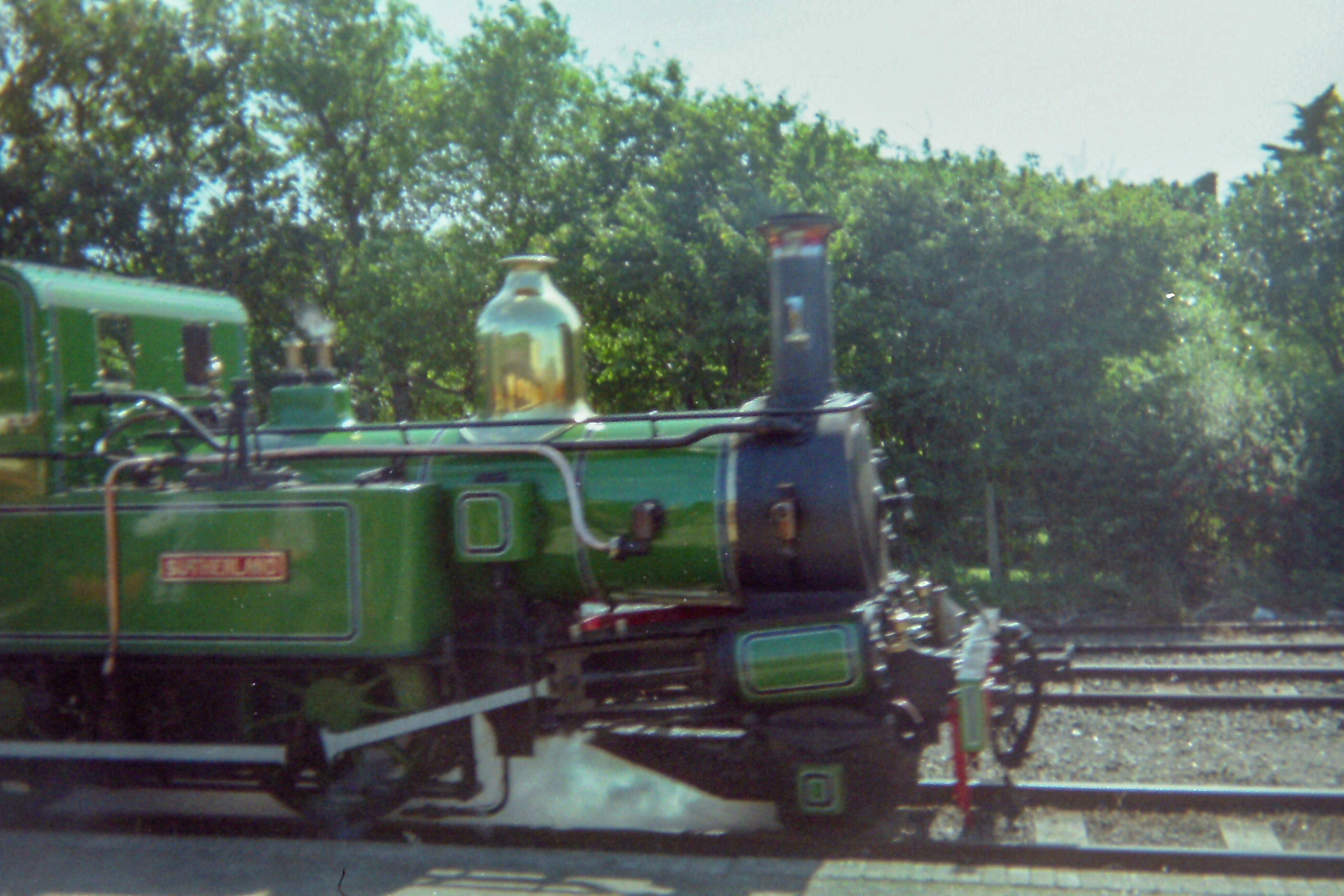
Running round its train at Port Erin Station in July 1998 during the Steam 125 celebrations for the anniversary of the Peel Line opening wearing a variant on the livery first applied in 1967.

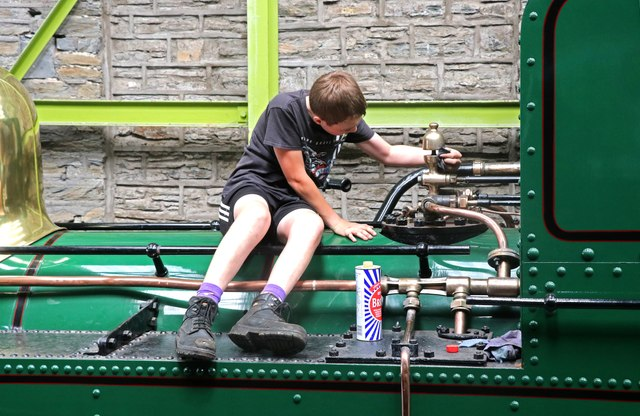
Plinthed in the Isle of Man Railway Museum next to Port Erin Station being cleaned by a young Isle of Man Steam Railway Supporters' Association volunteer in July 2024

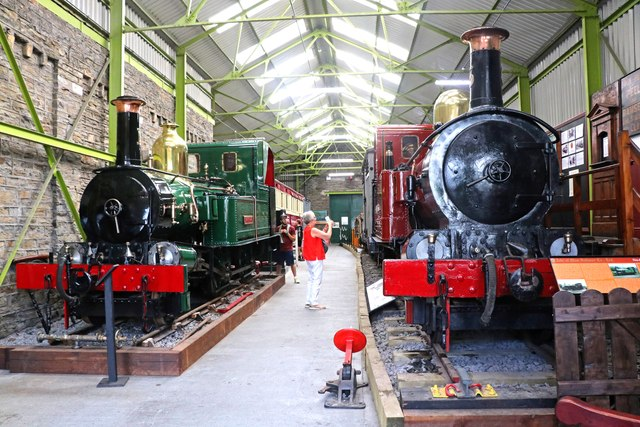
In the main exhibition hall of the Isle of Man Railway Museum in July of 2024 with No.6 Peveril alongside illustrating the isolated plinth on which the locomotive has resided since re-entering the hall in 2020, a space previously occupied by No.16 Mannin

This was one of three locomotives built for the opening of the Isle of Man Railway. It was named after George Sutherland-Leveson-Gower, 3rd Duke of Sutherland, the company director at the time. When Sutherland arrived it was assigned the first train on the new railway which ran on the 1st of July in 1873. It arrived with two other locomotives, with two further examples delivered the following year:-

- No.2 Derby
- No.3 Pender
- No.4 Loch
- No.5 Mona

The pattern continued until 1926 with the delivery of No.16 Mannin with modifications to each batch, which became larger and more powerful over the course of time.

=== 1873-1922 ===
It remained in service in largely original form from delivery, with modifications. The side tanks were enlarged prior to the turn of the century and the front spectacle plates (windows) were amended to be rectangular to improve visibility, though the rear spectacles remain smaller round ones to this day. Initially the locomotive operated with a timber toolbox mounted on the fireman's (left) side, and this is still on display in the museum today beside the locomotive.

=== 1923-1964 ===
The only significant amount of time the locomotive spent out of service was for major repairs from 1921 and a new boiler (which it still carries today). At this time it was fitted with two Ross "pop" safety valves in replacement of the original Salter safety valves (seen today on No.4 Loch); in latter days it operated on a reduced boiler pressure, largely restricted to use as a shunter at Douglas Station with some additional work banking heavy trains until 1964 when it was withdrawn from service completely, duties then being undertaken by No.13 Kissack.

=== 1967-1975 ===
Stored in the carriage shed at Douglas Station with the other disused locomotives from 1964, in 1967 the Marquess of Ailsa took over the railway's operations and with other retired locomotives it was repainted in the "Spring Green" livery which was inspired by London and North Eastern Railway Apple Green) and was put on display, first at St John's until the closure of the Peel Line in 1968, then later in the former goods yard at Douglas Station then ultimately in the Isle of Man Railway Museum from 1976 where it remained on an isolated plinth until 1997 in a space now occupied by one of the remained vans.

=== 1997-2000 ===
Removed from the railway museum, the locomotive was brought back to Douglas by rail hauled by younger sister No.10 G.H. Wood in October 1997 and stripped down for assessment before being restored, using the boiler from No.8 Fenella, in time for the 125th Anniversary of the Isle of Man Railway operating steam motive power, it having been the motive power used to haul the first official train to Peel back in 1873. As part of the year-long celebrations it occasionally pulled trains on the Manx Electric Railway between Laxeay and Fairy Cottage. The locomotive was later repainted into the railway's post-war standard "Indian Red" which was again the standard fleet livery of the time. In 2003 it was withdrawn from service and the boiler returned to the frames of No.8 Fenella.

=== 2001-2019 ===
With the donor boiler returned to No.8 Fenella the locomotive remained in dismantled condition, the main frames and cabs being stored in the infill shed at Douglas Station and the tanks stored outside the complex; work commenced in 2019 by volunteers of the Isle of Man Steam Railway Supporters' Association to collate the smaller components as work began on cosmetic restoration. This was completed over the course of a year and the locomotive turned out in the early livery giving an appearance as it would have been in the 1920s and 1930s.

=== 2020-Date ===
Following completion of this restoration it was put on display in 2020 in the Isle of Man Railway Museum in the place formerly occupied by No.16 Mannin. In 2023 to commemorate the one hundred and fiftieth anniversary of the opening of the Peel Line it was fitted temporarily with a replica banner bearing the legend "Douglas & Peel United" as it did on opening day when hauling the first official train. as of 2025 is on display in the Isle of Man Railway Museum.

== See also ==
- Isle of Man Railway locomotives
- Isle of Man Railway
- Isle of Man Railway Museum
- Rail transport in the Isle of Man
