= George Henry Wood (railway director) =

Director of the Isle of Man railway (1835–1925)

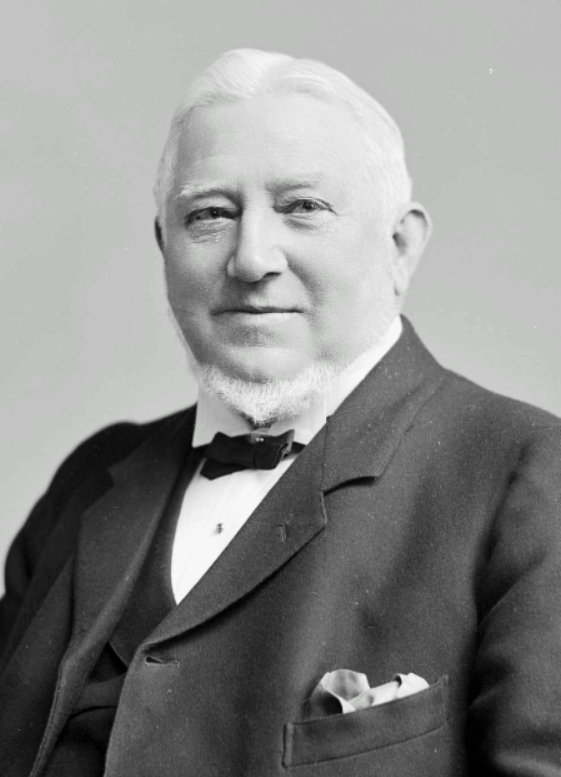
- George Henry Wood circa 1890
- Born: c. 1836; Slaithwaite, Yorkshire, England
- Occupation: Railroad administrator

George Henry Wood (c. 1836 - ?) was an English railroad administrator. He served as secretary and later director of the Isle of Man Railway. He was named secretary of the Railway in 1870 upon its founding and took an active role in establishing the company, including the acquisition of permits for construction of the railway and land procurement. In 1875, Wood became director of the railway.

Wood was born in Slaithwaite, Yorkshire, England, around 1836.

Wood was honoured by having the tenth steam locomotive named after him in 1905; this locomotive is still in service today. His grave is in the churchyard at Onchan on the island.
