= Port Erin Railway Museum =

Isle of Man Railway Museum
- Established: 23 August 1975
- Location: Station Road, Port Erin, Rushen, Isle of Man
- Coordinates: 54.085°N 4.758°W
- Type: Railway Museum
- Accreditation: Recommended Attraction www.visitisleofman.com
- Key holdings: No.5 Mona; No.1 Sutherland; F.36 Royal Saloon; F.75 Ducal Saloon; Closed Van G.19; Carriage M.N.Ry. No.6
- Collections: I.o.M.S.R.S.A. Various Contributors
- Visitors: Annually c.25,000 (Based On 2015 Figures)
- Presidents: None Appointed (2025); Graham Warhurst (1975)
- Curators: None Appointed (2025); Robert Hendry (1976)
- Owner: Department of Infrastructure
- Public transit access: Isle of Man Railway; Bus Vannin
- Parking: Street
- Website: www.rail.im

The Isle of Man Railway Museum in the village of Port Erin on the Isle of Man is a small museum of the history of the Isle of Man Railway from its founding in 1873 to the present, including the now-closed lines that served Peel, Ramsey (Manx Northern Railway) and Foxdale, and the remaining open line between Douglas and Port Erin.

== History & Location ==
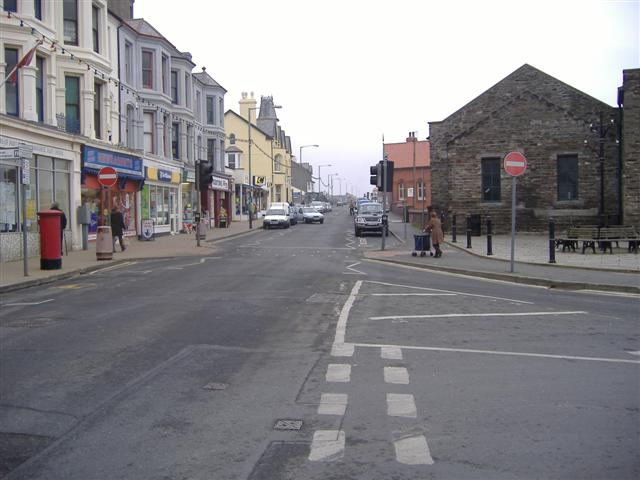
Station Road and museum (right) gable of the former goods shed visible and the station building itself in red brick in the distance; the paved area in front of the museum was established as part of the "plaza" scheme in 2017

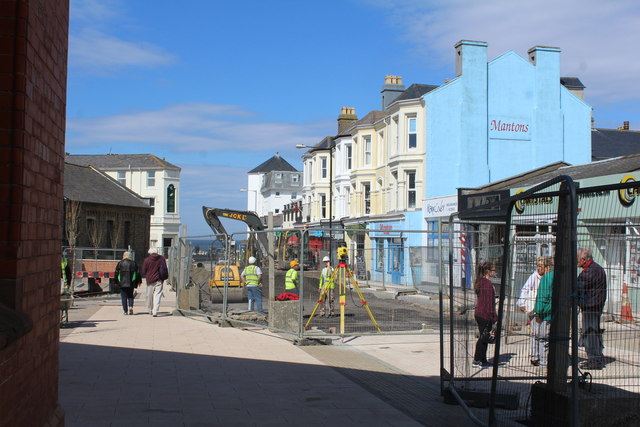
"Plaza" works on Station Road in 2017 with the souvenir shop and entrance of the museum visible in the distance on the left; this created sloped access to the museum directly from the platform for the first time

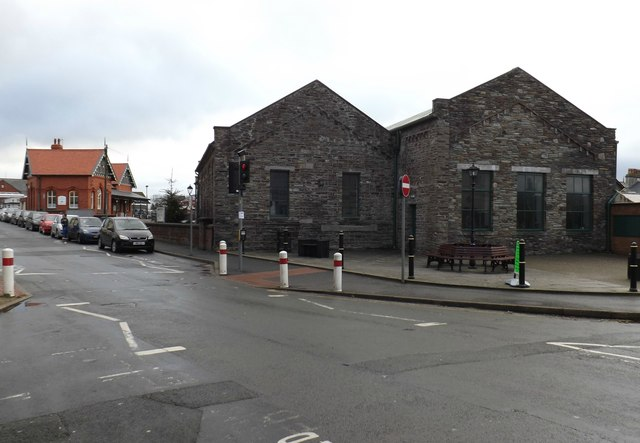
Station Road showing the modifications of 1998-1999 creating the replica stone gables where once there had been tall doors, the right side being the main access for buses into the depot

The museum opened in the summer of 1975 when the Isle of Man Road Services, a subsidiary of the railway company, relocated to their new garage, which still exists today at the foot of the main platform, which in turn saw the rationalisation of the railway station by the shortening of the former bay platform area to create parking spaces for buses. Today's main exhibition hall stands on the location of the former depot which was accessed via large doors on Station Road, these being used to deliver some of the larger exhibits upon the opening, there only ever being one rail-connected line from the nearby shed.

At that time, the railway operated only between here and Castletown, in an experimental season with the goal of reducing running costs. The following year, services were extended to Ballasalla, then returned to Douglas in 1977, since when the full line has operated. The building originally consisting of a metal frame with asbestos cladding, was rebuilt in 1999. Prior to opening, the original locomotive shed was used to store disused locomotives. When rebuilt, the locomotive shed was returned to its original use and the goods shed converted into a shop area and porch added.

The museum is next to Port Erin Station, the south-western terminus of the railway, on Station Road in the village. The main exhibition hall is housed in a converted bus garage that once belonged to Isle of Man Road Services, itself a division of the old railway company which was nationalised in 1976. Since the museum was extensively rebuilt in 1998–1999, part of the old goods shed has been incorporated into the complex, the other locomotive shed still being used as a workshop to maintain the locomotives and for overnight storage purposes. There remains today a small viewing window allowing visitors to the museum a glimpse into the locomotive shed from the main exhibition hall, this is mounted into the large doors which provide a rail connection for the relocation of wheeled exhibits.

== Exhibits ==
No.	Name	Builders	Year	Exhibited	Notes
No.1	Sutherland	Beyer, Peacock & Co., Ltd.	1873	1976–1997, 2020–Date	Restored I.o.M.S.R.S.A. 2019-2020
No.4	Loch	Beyer, Peacock & Co., Ltd.	1874	1997–1999, 2000-2001	In Traffic 2025
No.5	Mona	Beyer, Peacock & Co., Ltd.	1874	2023–2024. 2024-2025	Restored I.o.M.S.R.S.A. 2022-2023
No.6	Peveril	Beyer, Peacock & Co., Ltd.	1875	1997–2020, 2022–2023	Restored I.o.M.S.R.S.A. 1994-2021
No.9	Douglas	Beyer, Peacock & Co., Ltd.	1896	2025-Date	Restored I.o.M.S.R.S.A. 2023-2024
No.15	Caledonia	Dübs & Co., Ltd.	1885	1975–1993	In Traffic 2025
No.16	Mannin	Beyer, Peacock & Co., Ltd.	1926	1975–1998, 1999–2020	
F.36	Royal Saloon	Metropolitan Carriage & Wagon	1905	1975–1998, 1999–2023	Restored & Returned 2024-2025
F.75	Ducal Saloon	Metropolitan Carriage & Wagon	1873	1975–1998, 2000-Date	Two Four-Wheelers
N.42	Six-Wheeler	Swansea Carriage & Wagon	1879	1975–1999	Now (2025) Off-Island
N.45	Six-Wheeler	Swansea Carriage & Wagon	1879	2023-2024, 2025–Date	Fully Restored 1978-2020
M.78	Drop-Side	Metropolitan Carriage & Wagon	1925	2000–2016, 2017-Date	Exhibited Between Uses
H.1	Three-Plank	Metropolitan Carriage & Wagon	2000	2002-2018, 2019–Date	Exhibited Between Uses
G.1	Closed Van	Metropolitan Carriage & Wagon	1873	2023–Date	Restored I.o.M.S.R.S.A.
Gr.12	Closed Van	Swansea Carriage & Wagon	1879	1975–1998, 1999–2023	Port St. Mary

=== Major (previous & present) ===
The following represents and main exhibits of locomotives and rolling stock contained in the museum since its opening in 1975; during events periods and photographic charters certain items of stock are removed and alternatives take their places where available; since 2014 F.75 and G.19 have been plinthed on an isolated section of track, joined on another plinth in 2020 by No.1 Sutherland. Remaining items are rail connected via the station's locomotive shed. It is common for these items to be swapped as required, with F.36 being removed for restoration in 2023 and its place taken by a variety of wagons for example. Since it opened in 1975, the railway museum has housed a variety of major exhibits. Exhibits in the museum include two engines and two carriages as well as other equipment from the railway. The royal saloon, as used by Queen Elizabeth the Queen Mother in 1963 and by Queen Elizabeth II in 1972, are preserved in the museum. There is also a large display of photographs, posters and other memorabilia. In addition to the framed exhibits of old posters and the like, further displays are mounted on the walls of the station building itself in the waiting room and booking office. These were once part of the museum and donated by a preservationists group when the facility was first opened.

=== Gallery ===
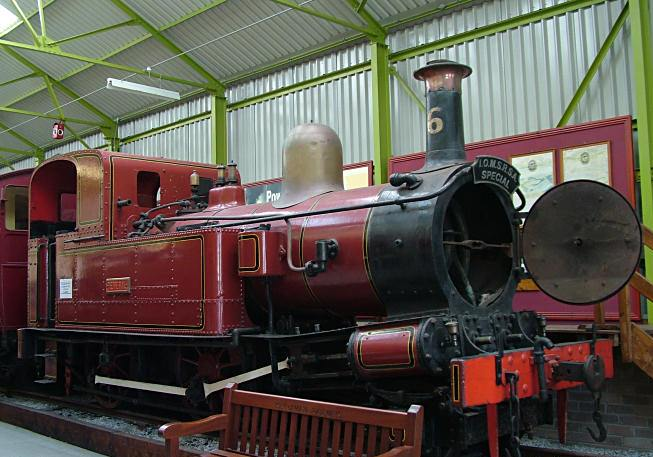
No.6 Peveril
(Built 1875)

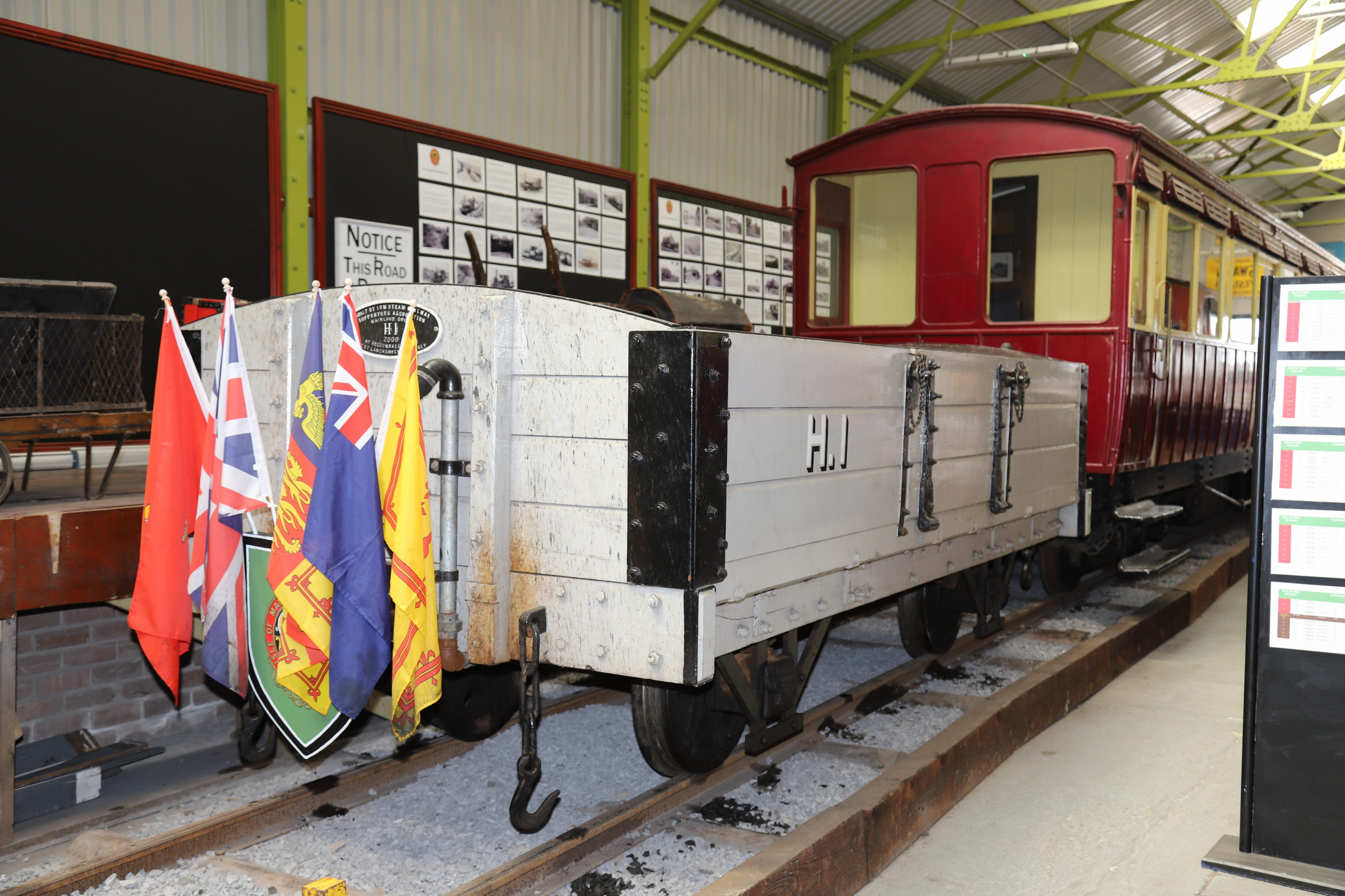
Wagon H.1
(Built 2000)

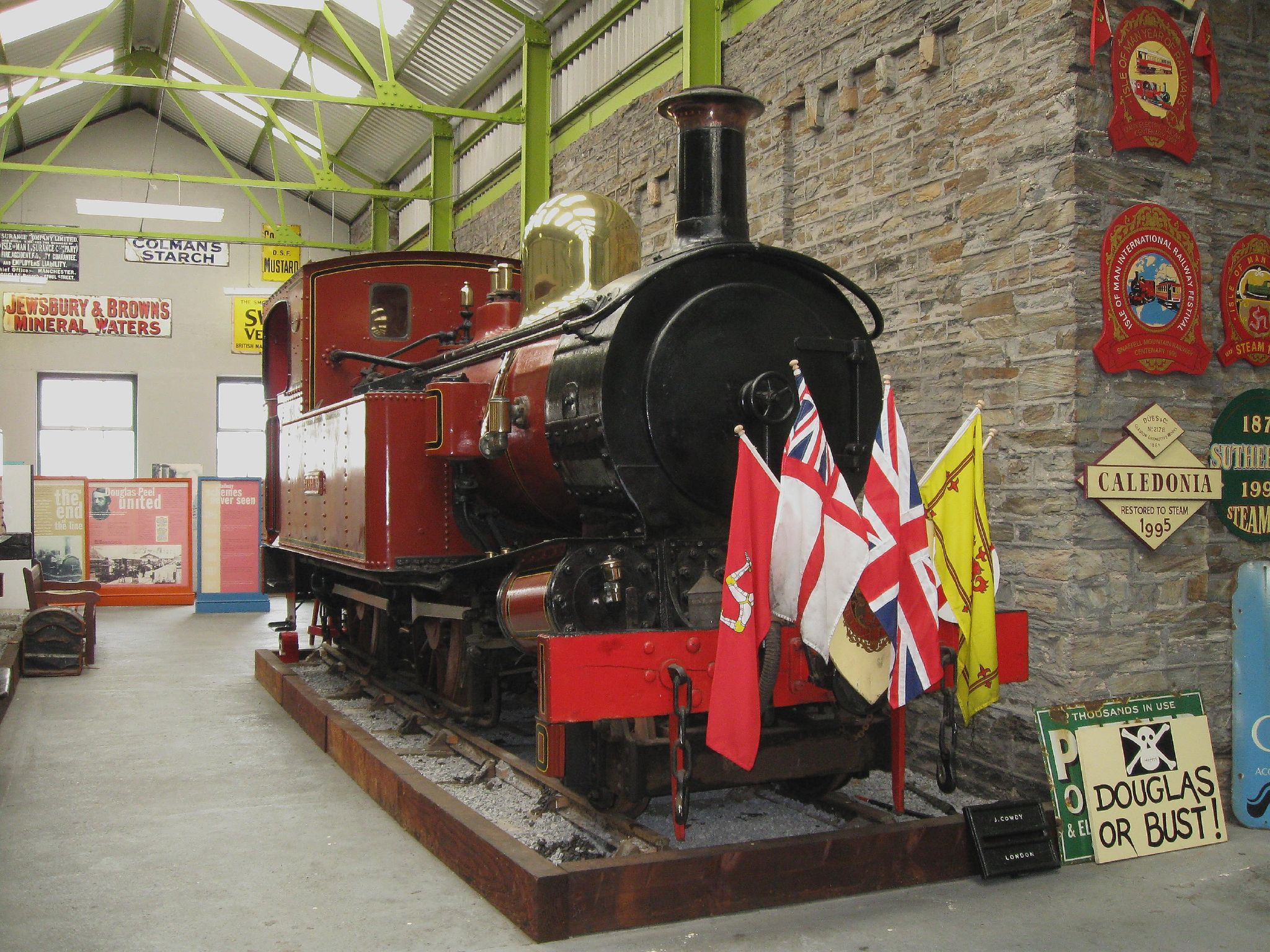
No.16 Mannin
(Built 1926)

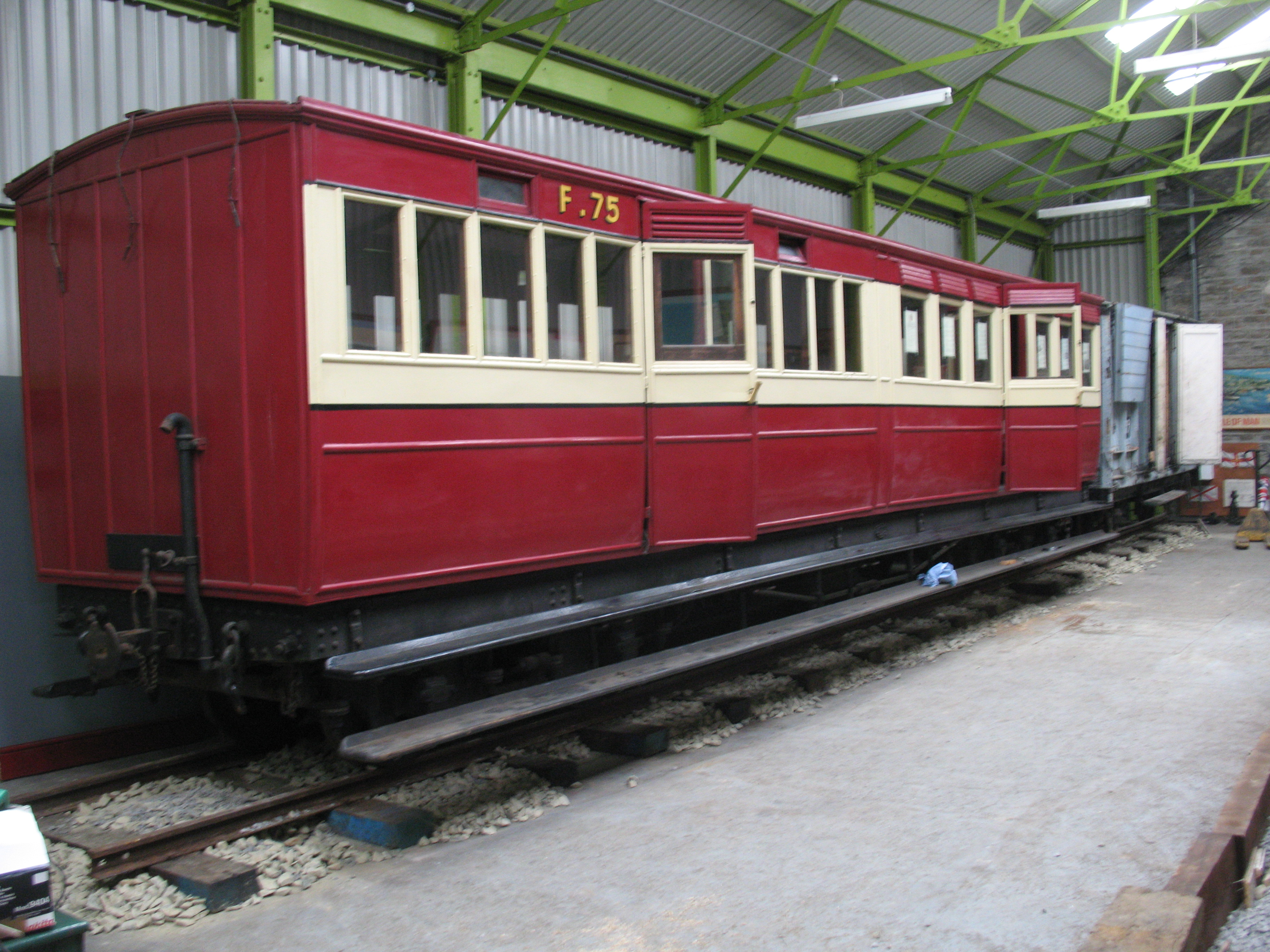
Ducal Saloon F.75
(Built 1873)

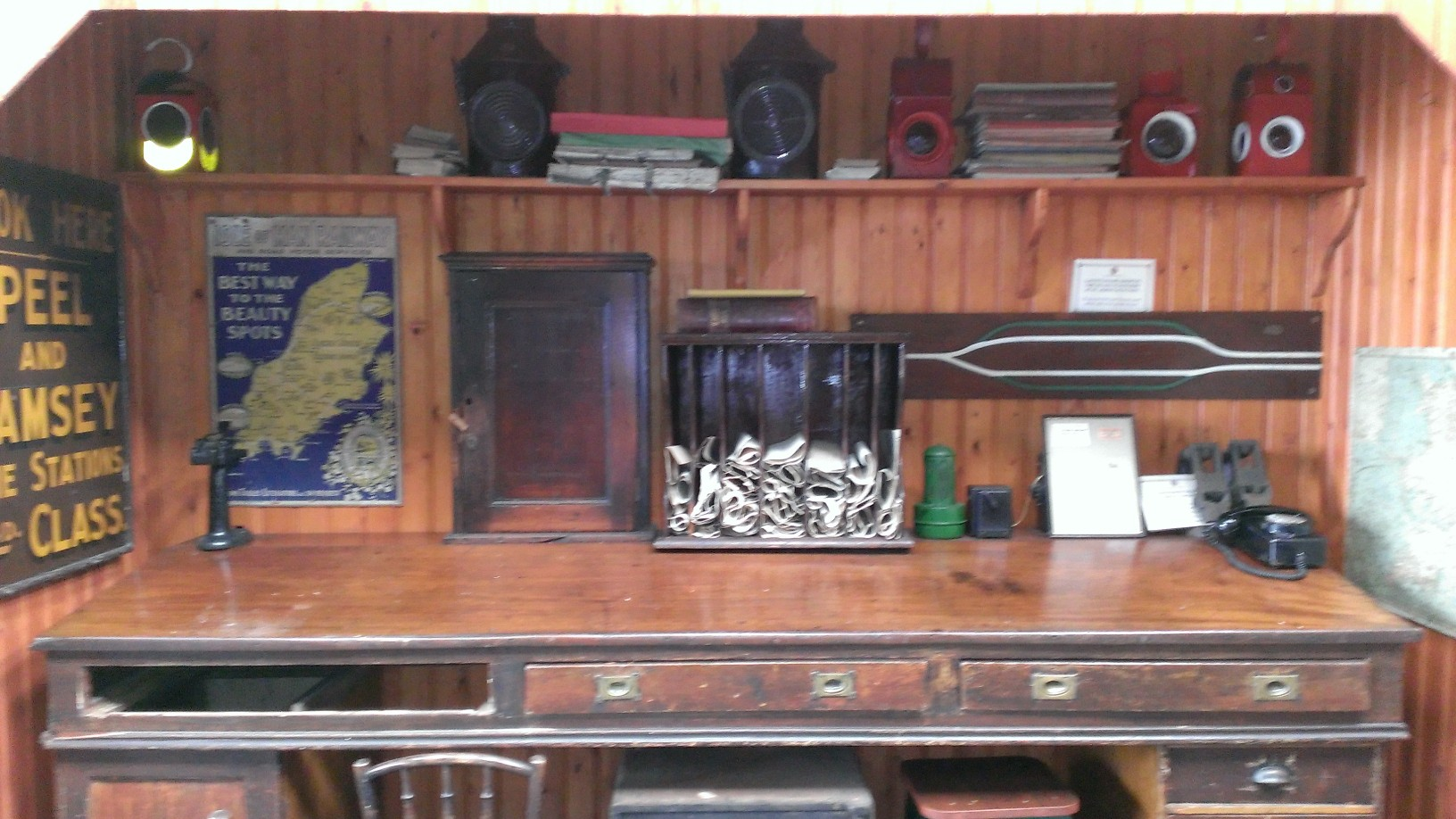
Station Diorama
(Extant 1998–2014)

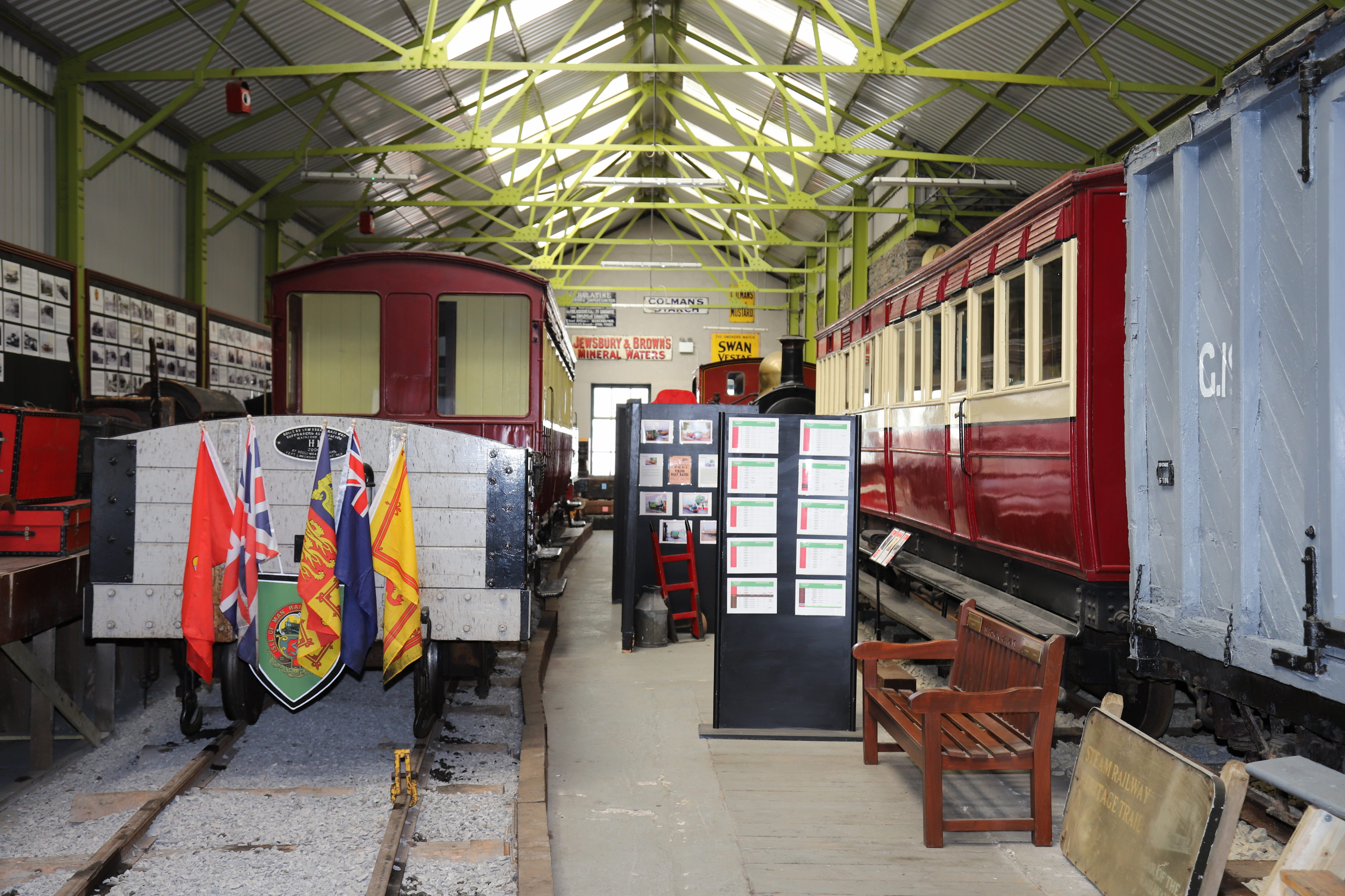
Main Hall
(Seen 2006)

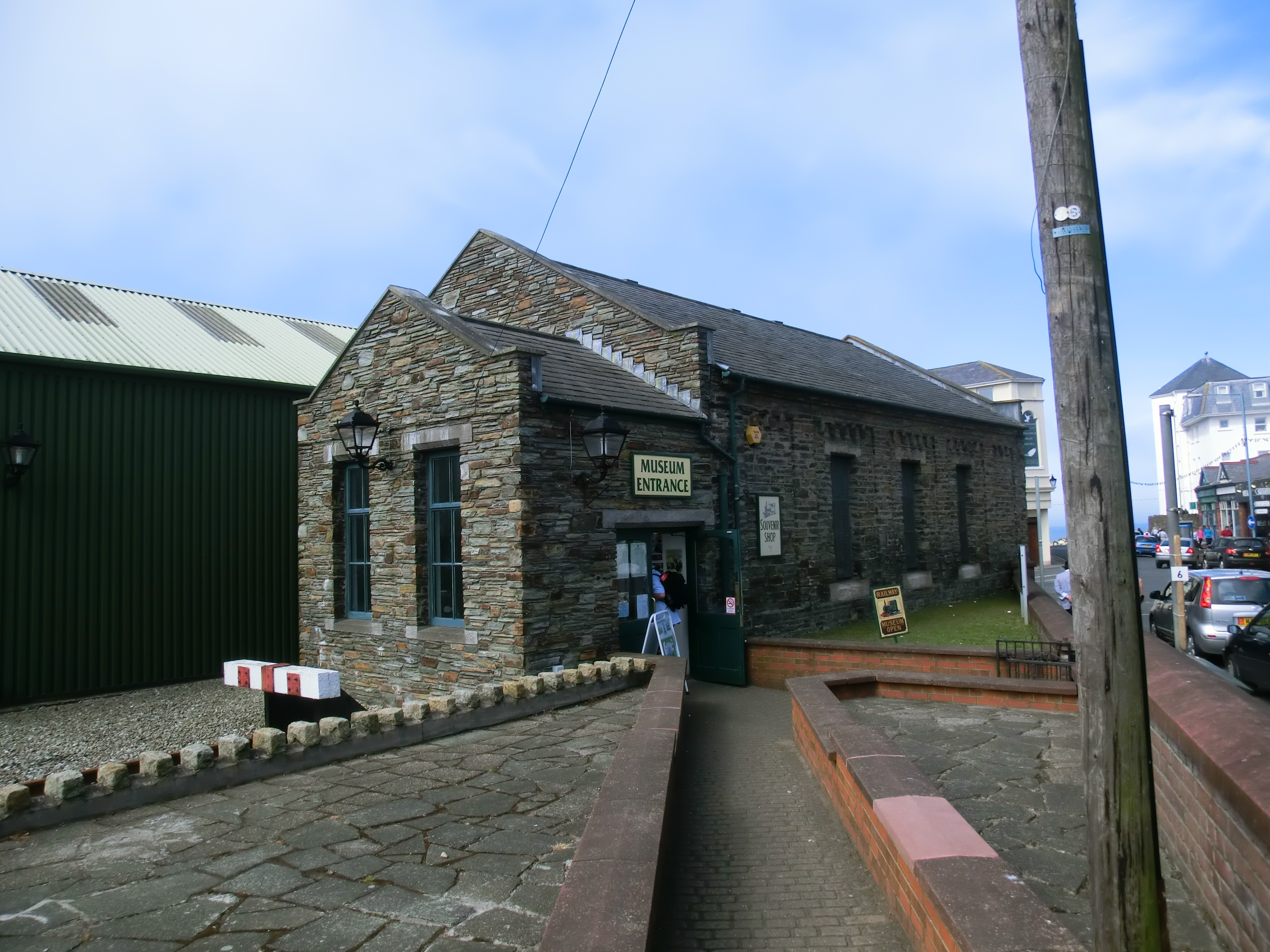
The old approach to the entrance seen in 2006 before it was re-modelled as part of the "plaza" scheme

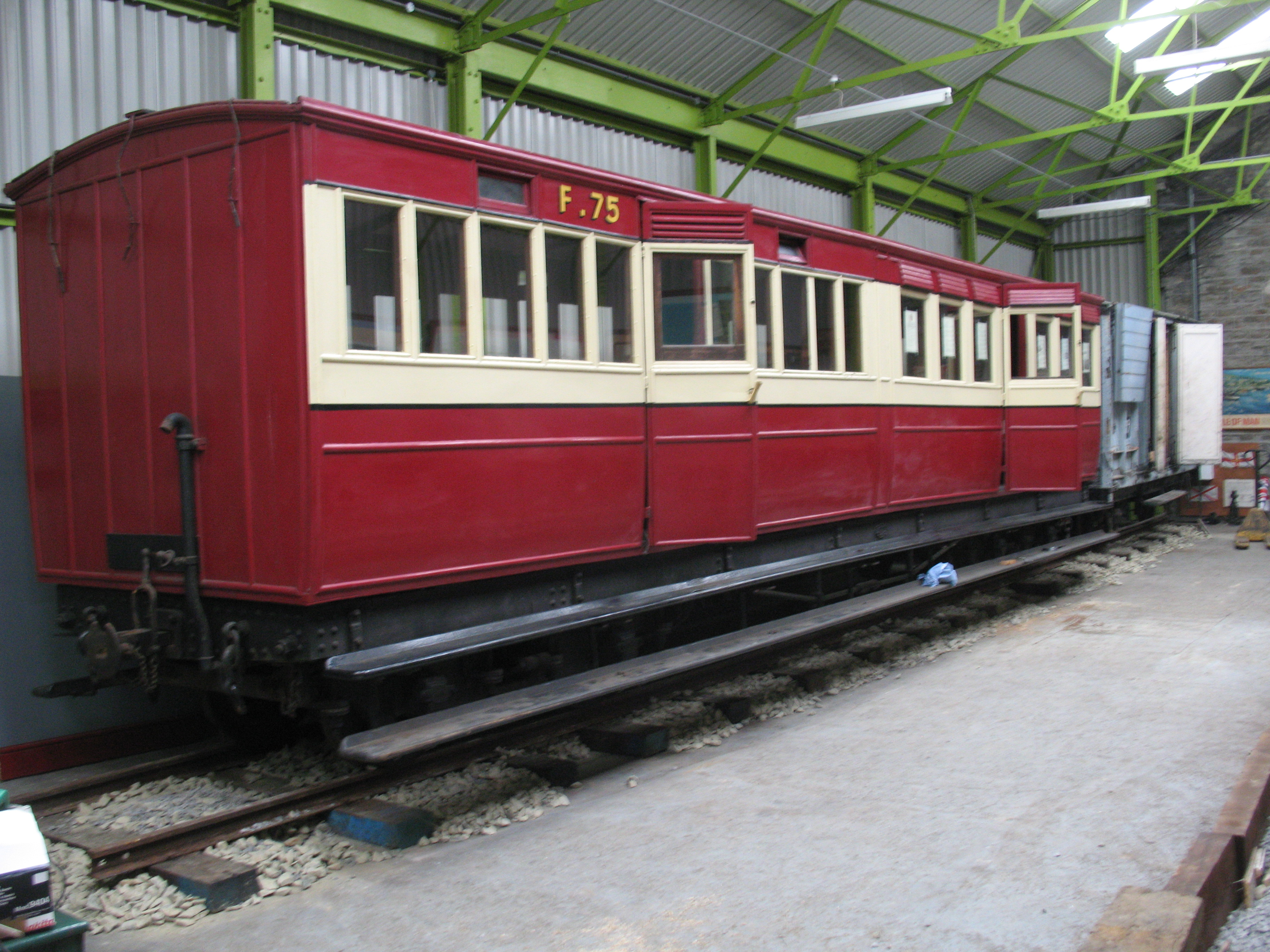
F.75, the Ducal Saloon with van G.19 on their isolated plinth which was fitted in the winter of 2013-2014 by I.o.M.S.R.S.A.

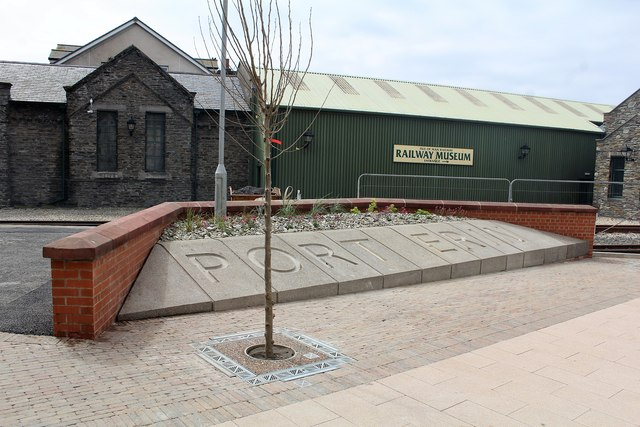
The "improved" entrance with main hall in the centre and locomotive shed to the left

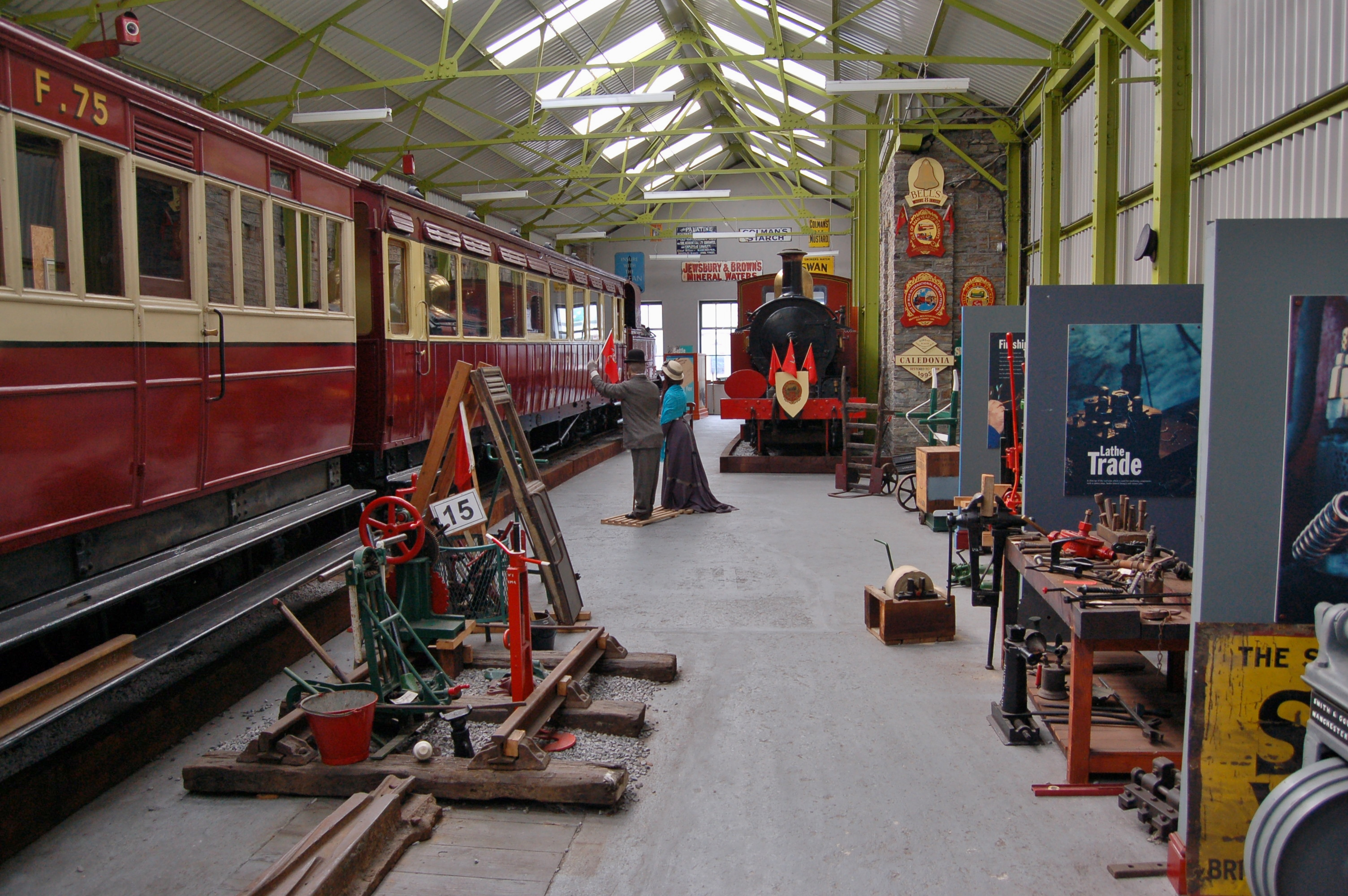
Exhibition Hall
(Seen 2006)

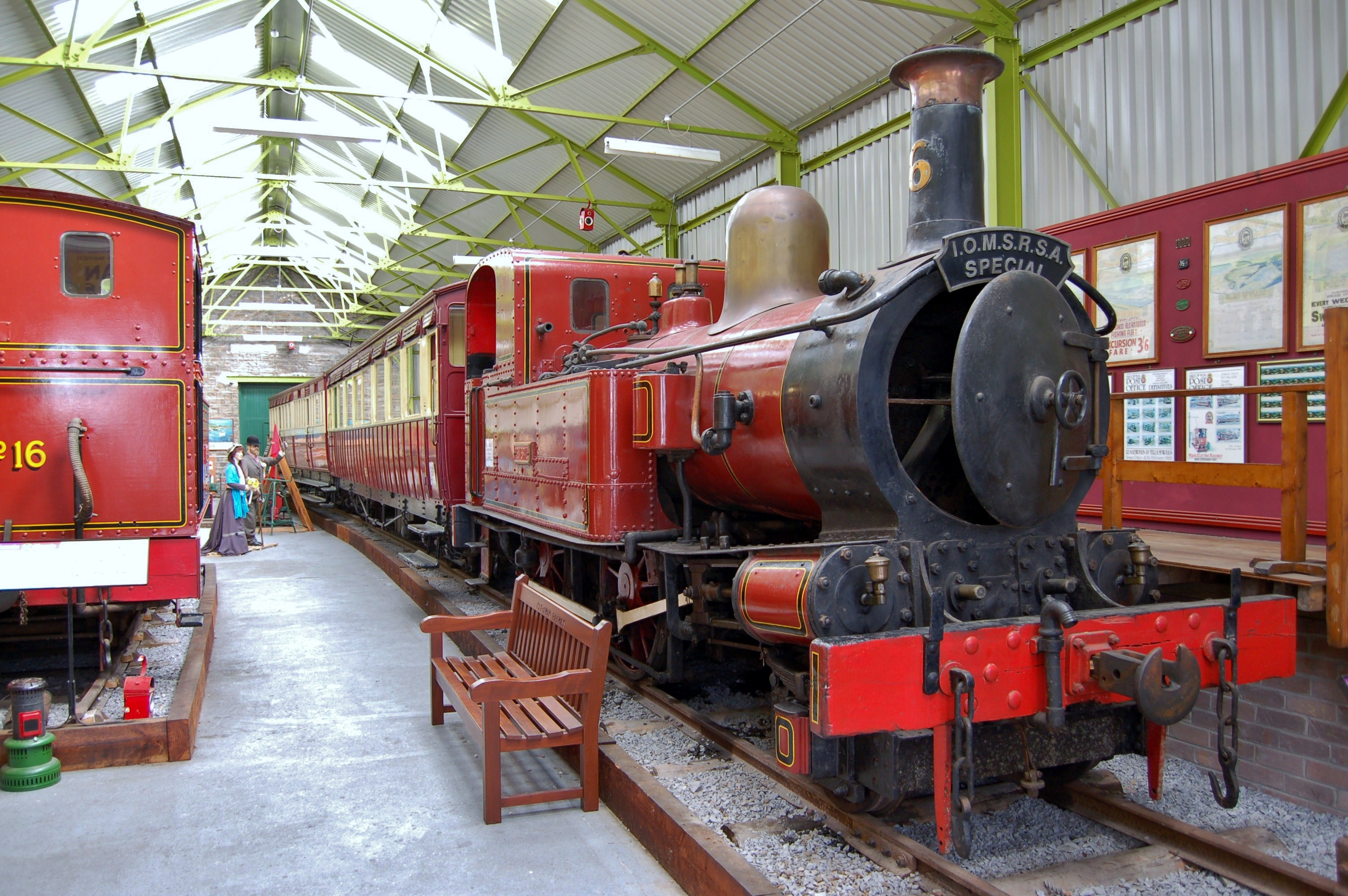
No.6 Peveril
(Seen 2012)

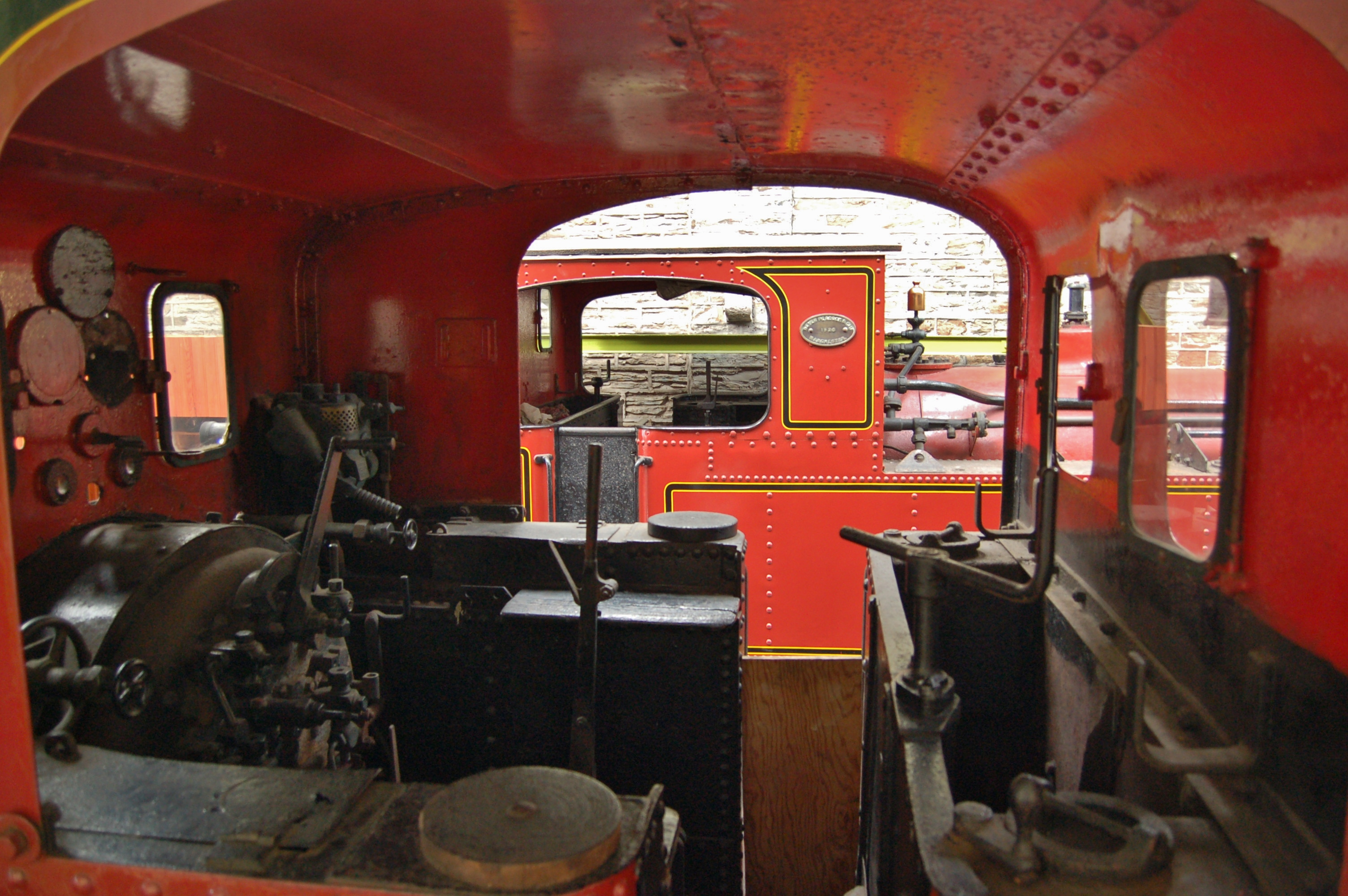
No.16 Mannin & No.6 Peveril (2006)

=== Minor (previous & present) ===
- Workshops' Wood-Turning Lathe
- Original (1873) Carriage Door
- Mock-Up Station Masters' Office
- Permanent Way Diorama Display
- Framed Original Ticket Displays
- Photographs of All Locomotives
- Old Planes & Lathes From Workshops
- Recreation of Station Master's Office
- Old Snow Plough from the Line
- Visual Display Boards Charting Histories
- Past & Present Headboards
- Anniversary Commemoration Displays
- Knockaloe Internment Camp Displays
- Glen Wyllin Pleasure Ground Display

== See also ==
- British narrow-gauge railways
- Isle of Man Railway locomotives
- Isle of Man Railway rolling stock
- Isle of Man Railway stations
- Isle of Man Railway
- Isle of Man Steam Railway Supporters' Association
