= Isle of Man Railway locomotives =

The locomotives of the Isle of Man Railway were provided exclusively by Beyer, Peacock & Company of Manchester, England between 1873 and 1926; other locomotives that appear on this list were inherited as part of the take-over of the Manx Northern Railway and Foxdale Railway in 1905, when the railway also purchased two more locomotives from Beyer, Peacock. All the steam locomotives have or had the 2-4-0T wheel arrangement, apart from No. 15 Caledonia (built by Dübs & Co. of Glasgow) which is an 0-6-0T.

In 2024 two modern, small diesel locomotives were acquired secondhand from Bord na Móna in Ireland.

== No. 1 Sutherland ==
| No. | Built | Name | Builder | Works No. | Wheel arr. | Withdrawn | Status | Livery | Origin of name |
|---|---|---|---|---|---|---|---|---|---|
| No. 1 | 1873 | Sutherland | Beyer, Peacock & Company | 1253 | 2-4-0T | 1921–1922, 1964–1998, 2003–Date | Railway Museum | Holly green (1873–1946) | Company chairman, George Sutherland-Leveson-Gower, 3rd Duke of Sutherland |

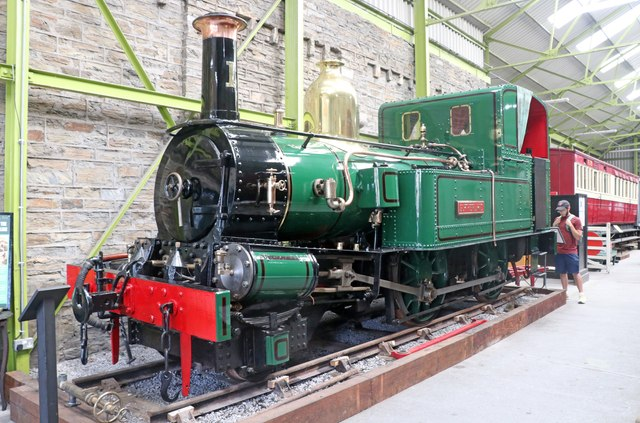
No.1 Sutherland cosmetically restored by the Isle of Man Steam Railway Supporters' Association and displayed in the Isle of Man Railway Museum.

The railway's first locomotive arrived on the island on 27 March 1873. It hauled the first train from Douglas to Peel on 1 May 1873, carrying the Duke of Sutherland, and the official opening train on 1 July the same year, for which the locomotive carried a banner stating "Douglas & Peel United".

The locomotive remained in service until 1964, latterly as Douglas shunter. When the Marquess of Ailsa took over the railway in 1967, it was painted spring green and placed on static display at St John's. It was later transferred to Douglas when the railway closed at the end of the 1968 season.

When the Isle of Man Railway Museum opened in 1975 Sutherland was moved there for display. Sutherland was taken to Douglas in 1997 and returned to service, using the boiler from No. 8 Fenella, for the railway's 125th anniversary the next year. During the anniversary year in 1998 the locomotive travelled to the Manx Electric Railway, on occasion steaming from Laxey to Fairy Cottage, and made a brief return to Peel railway station to commemorate the opening of the Peel line.

Sutherland was later repainted Indian red and when the locomotive was withdrawn its boiler was returned to No. 8. No. 1 was stored undercover at Douglas station until being cosmetically restored and returned to display in the railway museum in 2020. To mark the 150th anniversary of the first official train a replica "Douglas & Peel United" banner was fitted to the locomotive.

== No. 2 Derby ==
| No. | Built | Name | Builder | Works No. | Wheel arr. | Withdrawn | Status | Livery | Origin of name |
|---|---|---|---|---|---|---|---|---|---|
| No. 2 | 1873 | Derby | Beyer, Peacock & Company | 1254 | 2-4-0T | 1908–1909, 1929–1930, 1951–Date | Scrapped in 1980 | None | Earl of Derby |

No. 2 was delivered in 1873 as part of the original batch of three locomotives for the opening of the Douglas to Peel line. It was named after the Earl of Derby. The locomotive is often seen in early photographs without its back cab sheet (No. 1 also appears in this form on a famous photograph of opening day).

The locomotive was loaned to the Douglas & Laxey Coast Electric Tramway for use in construction of the Manx Electric Railway. No. 2 is the railway's only locomotive to have been scrapped, with just a pony truck surviving today. It was withdrawn in 1951 and dismantled at the time for use as spare parts for other locomotives. The frames were stored for many years before being scrapped in 1980. The surviving pony truck was kept and later re-built with new roller bearing axleboxes and entered regular service under another locomotive in 2020.

== No. 3 Pender ==
| No. | Built | Name | Builder | Works No. | Wheel arr. | Withdrawn | Status | Livery | Origin of name |
|---|---|---|---|---|---|---|---|---|---|
| No. 3 | 1873 | Pender | Beyer, Peacock & Company | 1255 | 2-4-0T | 1898–1899, 1912–1913, 1962–Date | Sectioned at Science and Industry Museum, Manchester | Holly green (1873–1946) | Company deputy chairman, John Pender |

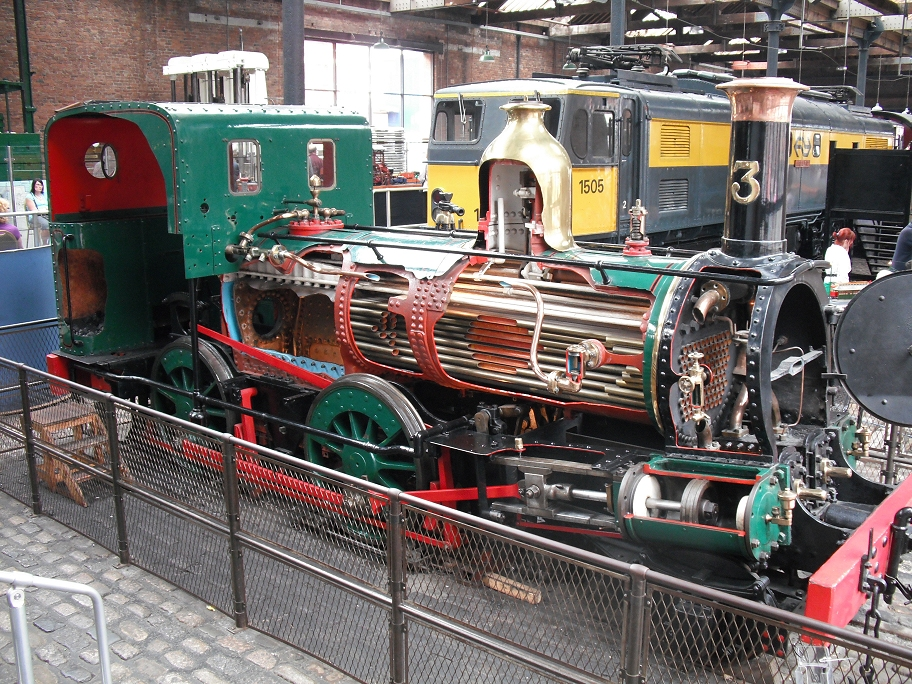
No. 3 Pender sectioned for display at the Science and Industry Museum in Manchester, the other side of the locomotive remains largely untouched.

This is the last of the original three locomotives. It was originally going to be named Viking, but this was changed to honour Sir John Pender, deputy chairman of the railway company.

In 1925, Pender was involved in an accident at Douglas station. The train failed to stop as it arrived at the station and crashed through the buffers before coming to rest in the concourse. The fireman remained in the engine and survived, but the driver jumped out and suffered fatal injuries. This accident and the following enquiry led to all rolling stock being fitted with vacuum brakes.

This locomotive was little modified over the years compared with its classmates, and was withdrawn from service in the 1950s. Pender was re-boilered in 1888 and 1913. The third and current boiler was made in 1923 for No. 2 Derby and was fitted in 1951 after that locomotive was broken up. The side rods are from No. 4. Loch (they are stamped 1416). Pender was cannibalised for spare parts to keep the other locomotives in service. Many non-ferrous fittings are missing.

Pender left the island in 1979 and has been sectioned for display at the Science and Industry Museum in Manchester.

== No. 4 Loch ==
| No. | Built | Name | Builder | Works No. | Wheel arr. | Withdrawn | Status | Livery | Origin of name |
|---|---|---|---|---|---|---|---|---|---|
| No. 4 | 1874 | Loch | Beyer, Peacock & Company | 1416 | 2-4-0T | 1955–1968, 1995–2002, 2015–2021 | In traffic | Indian red (1946–1965) | Henry Loch, 1st Baron Loch |

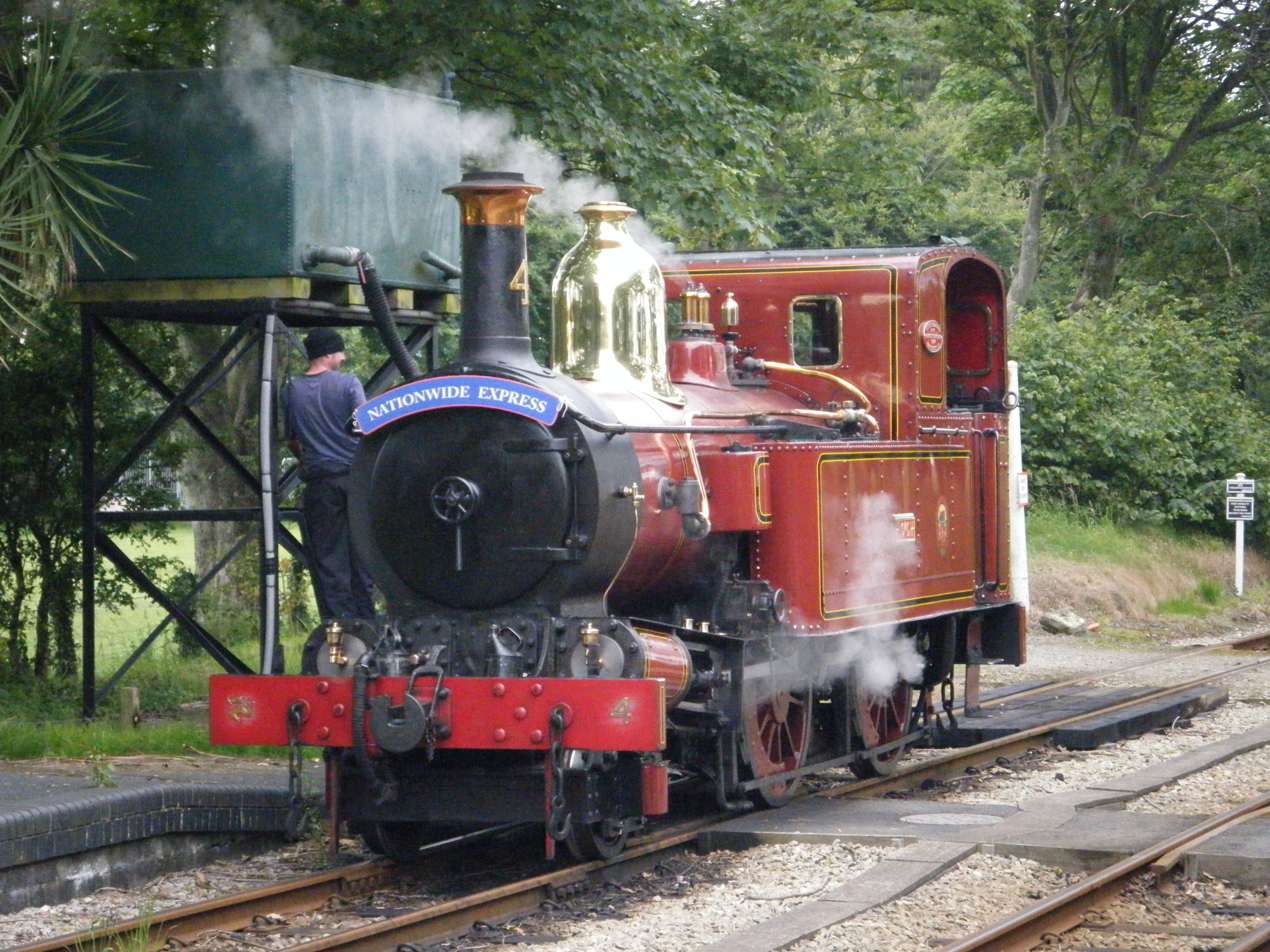
No. 4 Loch beside the water tower at Castletown in 2012

Locomotive No. 4 was delivered in 1874 for the opening of the Port Erin line. It was named after the island's lieutenant governor, Henry Brougham Loch. As originally built Loch was a small-boiler locomotive, although it had larger water tanks and bunkers than the original three locomotives. It was rebuilt with a larger boiler in 1909, which gave it the same tractive effort as Nos. 10 and 11.

No. 4 received a new boiler in 1967 and returned to service in September 1968 just in time to haul one of the last trains to Peel before that line closed. The locomotive was based at Port Erin for many years, and was unusual in that it worked with its chimney towards Douglas. During the 1993 Year Of Railways the locomotive hauled special services on the Manx Electric Railway.

After being withdrawn from service in 1995, Loch underwent an overhaul in 1998–2000, including fitting a new boiler and returned to service. Following a further overhaul starting in 2017, the locomotive has been in traffic again since 2021. During the 2017–2021 overhaul it was fitted with Salter safety valves, which had not been seen in service on the railway for over 60 years. From 1979 until withdrawal, the locomotive had and a non-standard maroon livery. It currently carries the familiar Indian red livery.

== No. 5 Mona ==
| No. | Built | Name | Builder | Work No. | Wheel arr. | Withdrawn | Status | Livery | Origin of name |
|---|---|---|---|---|---|---|---|---|---|
| No. 5 | 1874 | Mona | Beyer, Peacock & Company | 1417 | 2-4-0T | 1909–1911, 1937–1938, 1969–Date | Cosmetically restored | Spring green (1967–1978) | Latin name for Isle of Man |

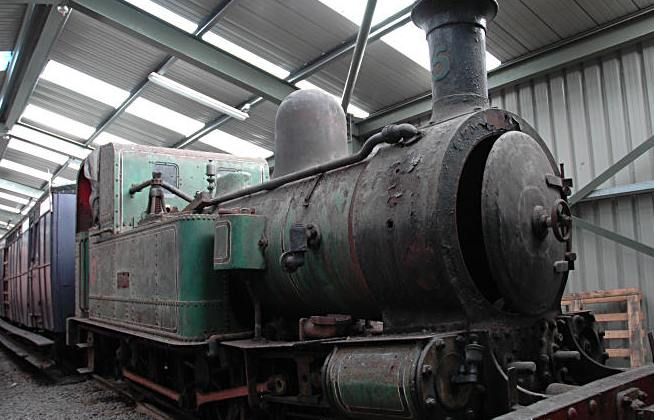
No. 5 Mona in storage in the carriage shed at Douglas in 2007, still carrying the spring green livery applied in 1967 albeit very faded.

Locomotive No. 5 arrived with No. 4 in 1874 for the opening of the Port Erin line. It was rebuilt as a medium-boilered locomotive in 1911. Last reboilered in 1946, No. 5 was a regular on the Peel line later in its career.

The locomotive remained in service right until 1968. It was privately purchased from the newly nationalised railway in 1978 but bought back in 2012. The locomotive was stored in the carriage shed at Douglas, including several years in a sealed tent with No. 9 Douglas due to the presence of asbestos. Following the removal of the asbestos in 2020, the Isle of Man Steam Railway Supporters' Association cosmetically restored the locomotive for the 150th anniversary celebrations of the Peel line in 2023. Mona then entered the Railway Museum adjacent to Port Erin railway station, where it remains exhibited today.

== No. 6 Peveril ==
| No. | Built | Name | Builder | Works No. | Wheel arr. | Withdrawn | Status | Livery | Origin of name |
|---|---|---|---|---|---|---|---|---|---|
| No. 6 | 1875 | Peveril | Beyer, Peacock & Company | 1524 | 2-4-0T | 1901–1902, 1929–1932, 1960–Date | Cosmetically restored | Indian red (1946–1965) | Sir Walter Scott's Peveril of the Peak |

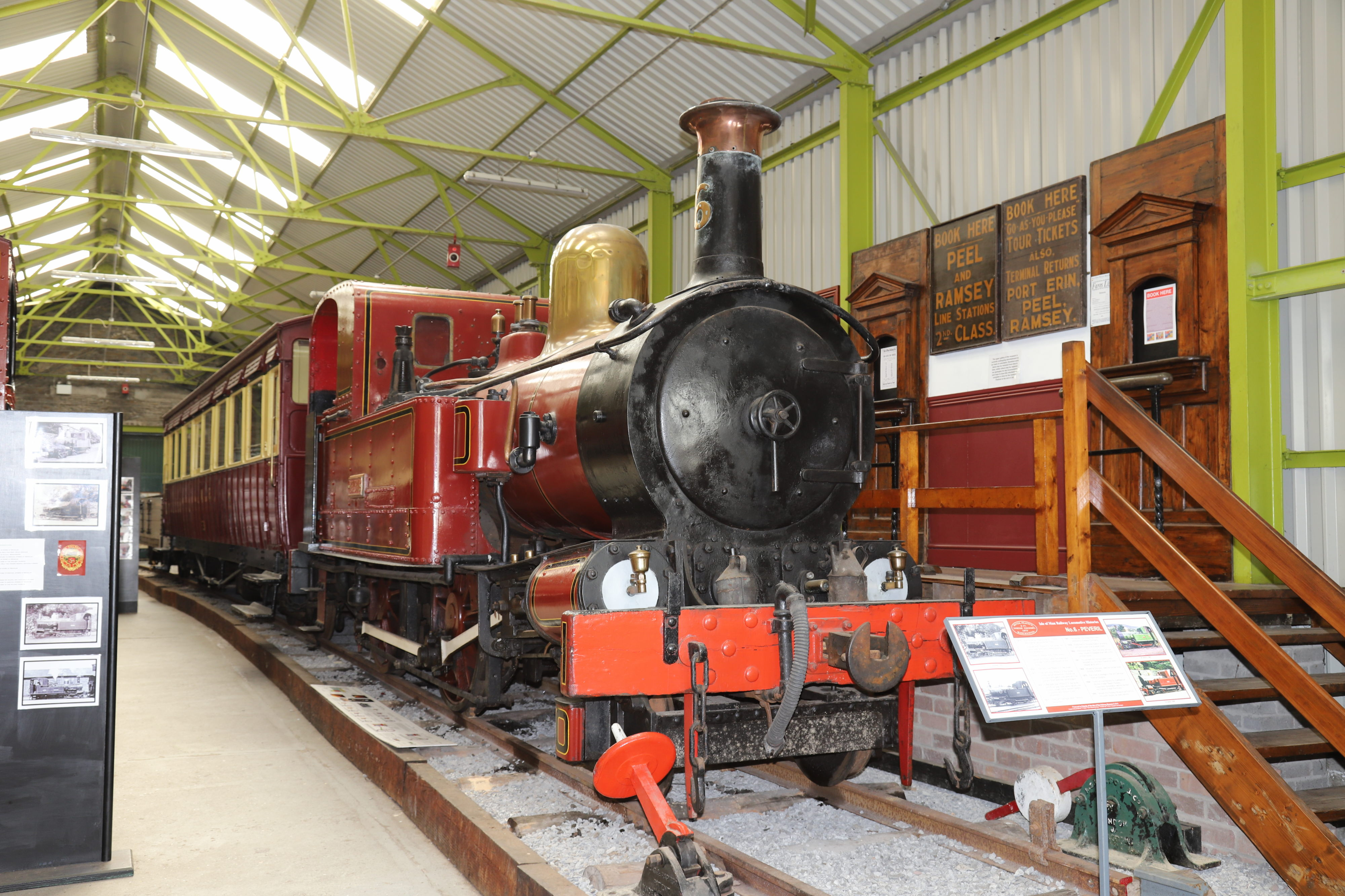
No. 6 Peveril on display in the Isle of Man Railway Museum in the post-war red livery

No. 6 Peveril was a one-off purchase in 1875 from Beyer, Peacock & Co. (works number 1524) and was identical to Nos. 4 and 5. It was rebuilt as a medium-boiled locomotive in 1911, and last reboilered in 1932.

The locomotive saw extensive use on Peel Line for many years and was withdrawn from service in 1960, having been station shunter at Douglas for a number of years. In 1967, it was put on static display at St. John's station, and was relocated to Douglas station for display purposes after the Peel and Ramsey lines closed in 1968.

Peveril was offered to the National Railway Museum in the late 1970s, but was not taken and the locomotive was stored for several years in the carriage shed at Douglas with No. 5 Mona before being cosmetically restored by members of the Isle of Man Steam Railway Supporters' Association in 1994. The locomotive was then displayed in the Railway Museum until 2023 when it was moved to the goods shed at Port St Mary.

== No. 7 Tynwald ==
| No. | Built | Name | Builder | Works No. | Wheel arr. | Withdrawn | Status | Livery | Origin of name |
|---|---|---|---|---|---|---|---|---|---|
| No. 7 | 1880 | Tynwald | Beyer, Peacock & Company | 2027 | 2-4-0T | 1900–1901, 1928–1929, 1947–Date | In private storage | Holly green (bunker) | Manx parliament |

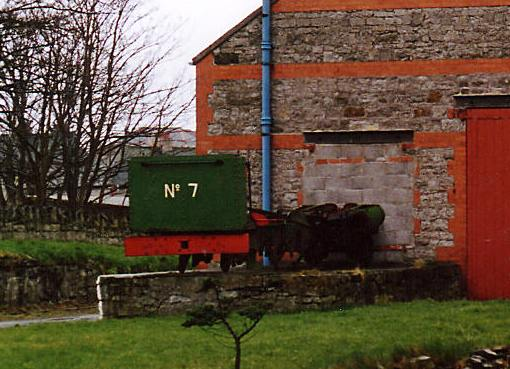
The frames and bunker of No. 7 Tynwald displayed on the former goods dock at Castletown station in 1989

Built in 1880 (Beyer, Peacock works number 2038) and named after the Manx parliament, this locomotive was identical to Nos. 4-6. No. 7 was the first of the fleet to have sandboxes placed just ahead of the water tanks. As a result, the feedwater pipe was changed from the original C-shaped end to an "S" shape entering the boiler between the smokebox and first cladding ring, rather than between the first and second cladding rings.

The locomotive was involved in a collision with No. 10 G.H. Wood in 1928, and the frames were badly damaged at this time. Tynwald was the first of the railway's locomotives to be withdrawn from service in 1947. The tanks and cab were scrapped in 1974 while the remaining main frames and coal bunker were purchased by Isle of Man Railway Society. These were displayed on the goods platform at Castletown station but have since been moved to storage in Weeting, Norfolk.

== No. 8 Fenella ==
| No. | Built | Name | Builder | Works No. | Wheel arr. | Withdrawn | Status | Livery | Origin of name |
|---|---|---|---|---|---|---|---|---|---|
| No. 8 | 1894 | Fenella | Beyer, Peacock & Company | 3610 | 2-4-0T | 1969–2003, 2008–2012, 2020–Date | Withdrawn | Indian red (1946–1965) | Sir Walter Scott's Peveril of the Peak |

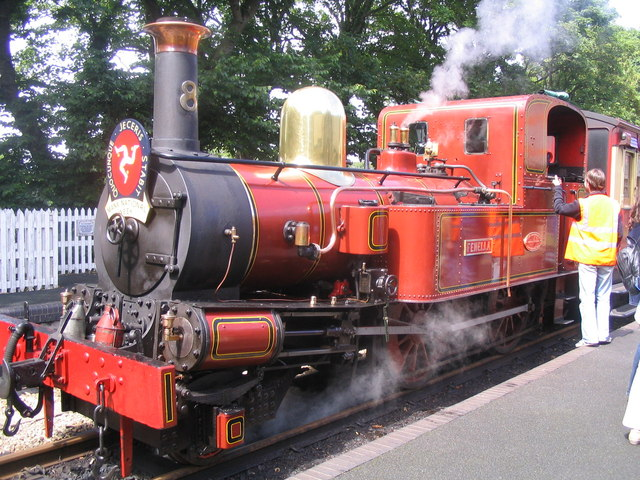
No. 8 Fenella at Castletown in July 2008 showing its small size compared with its shedmates

Fenella, built in 1894, was identical to No. 7 Tynwald except for being fitted with a higher pressure (160 psi) boiler. For many years it was based on the Ramsey line and the locomotive was still in service for the Marquess of Ailsa's revival in 1967.

The locomotive was purchased by a preservation group in 1978 with the goal of complete restoration, and in 1988 the boiler was removed from the frames and sent to the Severn Valley Railway's workshops for reconstruction. This was a long-term project and as relationships between the owners and management soured the project did not reach fruition. However, the owners offered the boiler (now complete) for No. 1 Sutherland so that it could return to service for the Steam 125 celebrations in 1998. After three years the boiler was then returned to No. 8, which was a member of the active fleet until early summer 2008.

Fenella kept its original 385 imp gal (1,750 L) tanks and carries a unique 2 ft 11 in (890 mm) 160 psi boiler. This boiler gives Fenella the same theoretical power output as the medium boiler locomotives, but in reality it is inclined to run short of steam on heavy trains. As the sole example of the smaller engines it was often seen on lighter trains, specials and acting as station pilot. The locomotive returned to railway ownership in April 2012. In 2020 the locomotive was withdrawn from service and as of 2022 it was awaiting overhaul.

== No. 9 Douglas ==
| No. | Built | Name | Builder | Works No. | Wheel arr. | Withdrawn | Status | Livery | Origin of name |
|---|---|---|---|---|---|---|---|---|---|
| No. 9 | 1896 | Douglas | Beyer, Peacock & Company | 3815 | 2-4-0T | 1909–1911, 1922–1922, 1953–Date | Cosmetically restored | Holly green | Island's capital |

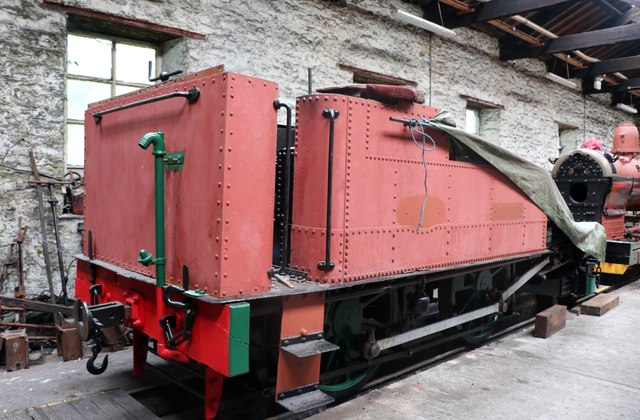
No.9 Douglas in the running shed Douglas during cosmetic restoration by the Isle of Man Steam Railway Supporters' Association.

A further increase in traffic led the railway company to order another locomotive in 1896, with No. 9 Douglas being Beyer, Peacock works number 3815. Douglas is the last of the original small-boiler locomotives and is the only example still in original condition, having received only a new boiler only twice, most recently in 1912, and been little altered otherwise since delivery. The only major modifications to the locomotive have been the fitting of steam sanding gear and vacuum brakes.

The locomotive was withdrawn in 1953, It was stored and cosmetically restored for the 1969 season but then sold in 1978, though it never left the railway and later returned to railway ownership. No. 9 was later stored in Douglas carriage shed due to asbestos contamination. Following removal of asbestos in 2020, No. 9 underwent a three-year long cosmetic restoration by the Isle of Man Steam Railway Supporters' Association before being was unveiled at the Manx Heritage Transport Festival in July 2025. Its livery is based on photographic evidence of the original green livery, it entered the Isle of Man Railway Museum on 1 October 2025 with saloon F.36.

== No. 10 G.H. Wood ==
| No. | Built | Name | Builder | Works No. | Wheel arr. | Withdrawn | Status | Livery | Origin of name |
|---|---|---|---|---|---|---|---|---|---|
| No. 10 | 1905 | G.H. Wood | Beyer, Peacock & Company | 4662 | 2-4-0T | 1977–1992, 2006–2007, 2017–Date | Undergoing overhaul | Spring green (1967–1978) | Company director, George Henry Wood |

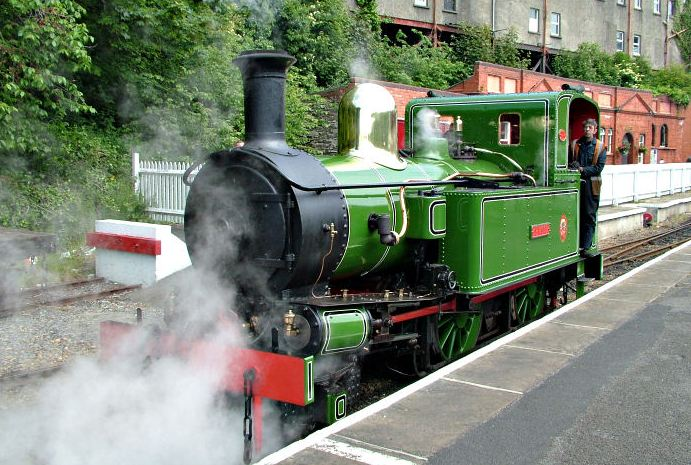
No. 10 G.H.Wood at Douglas in 2010 showing the spring green livery applied in 2007 to commemorate the fortieth anniversary of reopening

No. 10 was the first of two locomotives purchased in 1905, partly as replacements for MNR Nos. 1 and 2 on the Ramsey line. It was the first medium boiler locomotive and was named after the railway company director and former secretary George Henry Wood.

As the first of the larger locomotive class on the line, it was extensively used and rarely out of service, operating mostly on the south line. It worked through the Marquess of Ailsa years to nationalisation, but was withdrawn in 1977 with a defective boiler and stored in Douglas works. The locomotive's frames were badly bent by a collision with No. 7 Tynwald in 1928, and damaged again in a collision with No. 12 Hutchinson in 1967.

G.H. Wood returned to service in 1993 as part of the Year of Railways, using the boiler from No. 13 Kissack when that locomotive was withdrawn. At this time it carried a darker green livery with black and red lining, which was an approximation of its original livery. In 2007 the locomotive was painted spring green to mark the fortieth anniversary of Lord Ailsa's takeover of the railway. The locomotive was withdrawn after its boiler certificate expired in 2017, and an overhaul began shortly afterwards. The boiler was sent for repair in 2018 and as of 2023 the frames were under overhaul at Alan Keef Ltd.

== No. 11 Maitland ==
| No. | Built | Name | Builder | Works No. | Wheel arr. | Withdrawn | Status | Livery | Origin of name |
|---|---|---|---|---|---|---|---|---|---|
| No.11 | 1905 | Maitland | Beyer, Peacock & Company | 4663 | 2-4-0T | 1958–1959, 1978–1981, 2007–2022 | In traffic | Spring green (1967–1977) | Company director, Dalrymple Maitland |

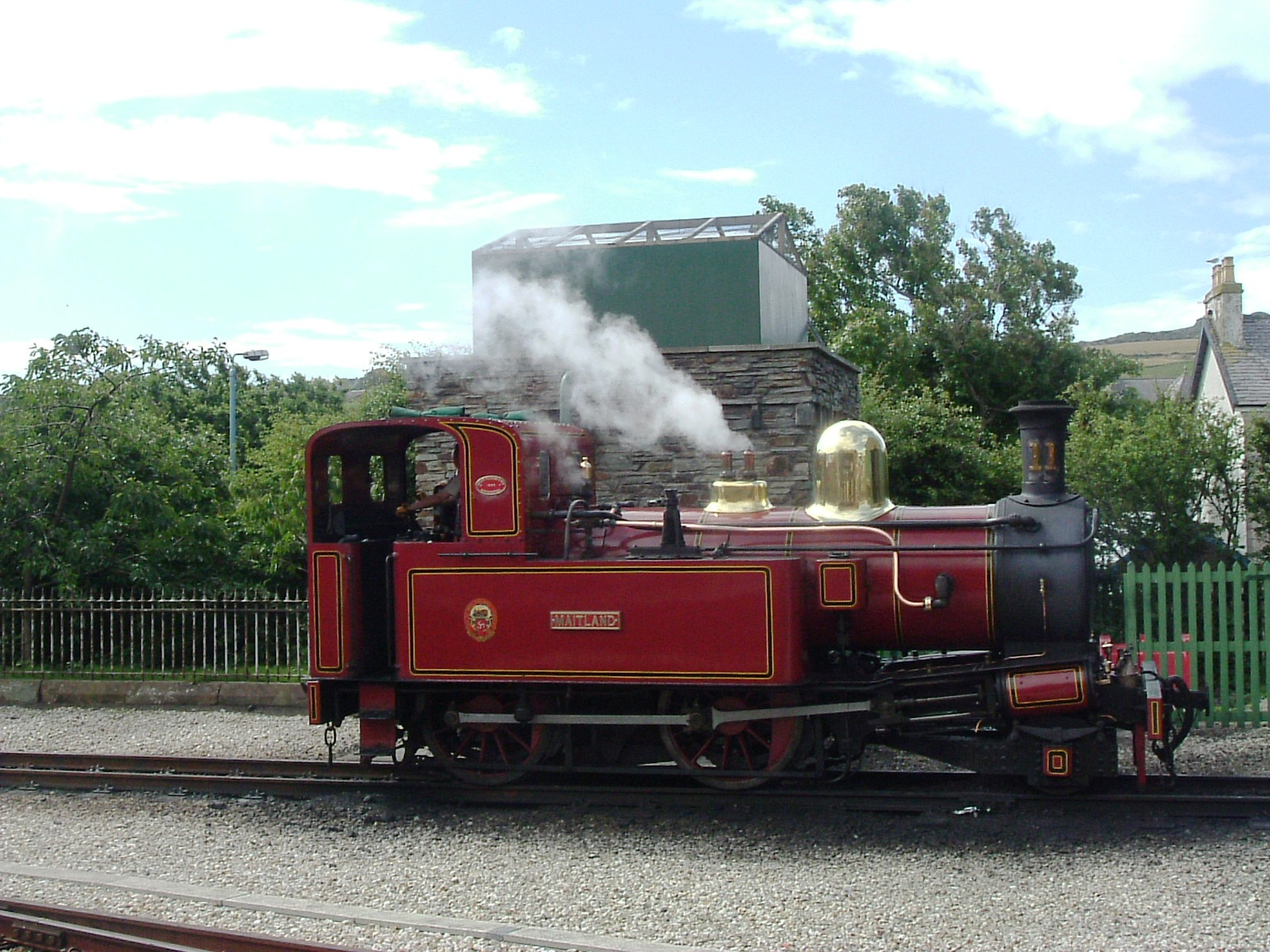
No.11 Maitland beside the water tower at Port Erin in 2005

The second of the 1905-built locomotives was named after another company director and is the longest-serving member of the railway. Maitland received a new boiler in 1959 which was the final boiler supplied by Beyer Peacock to the Isle of Man The locomotive remained in use until the end of company operation, through the Marquess of Ailsa years and into nationalisation.

Another boiler was fitted in 1981 (the first under government ownership) when the locomotive was re-painted into the current Indian red livery, having previously carried spring green. In 1989 it was painted unlined matte black for the filming of a television dramatisation of The Ginger Tree and it retained this livery for the rest of that season before being repainted Indian red.

The locomotive was withdrawn in 2007. It was given a new boiler manufactured the Severn Valley Railway, overhauled at Alan Keef Ltd in 2019–2021 and entered service again in 2022.

== No. 12 Hutchinson ==
| No. | Built | Name | Builder | Works No. | Wheel arr. | Withdrawn | Status | Livery | Origin of name |
|---|---|---|---|---|---|---|---|---|---|
| No. 12 | 1908 | Hutchinson | Beyer, Peacock & Company | 5126 | 2-4-0T | 1977–1980, 1999–2006, 2019–Date | Undergoing overhaul | – | Company director, William Hutchinson MHK |

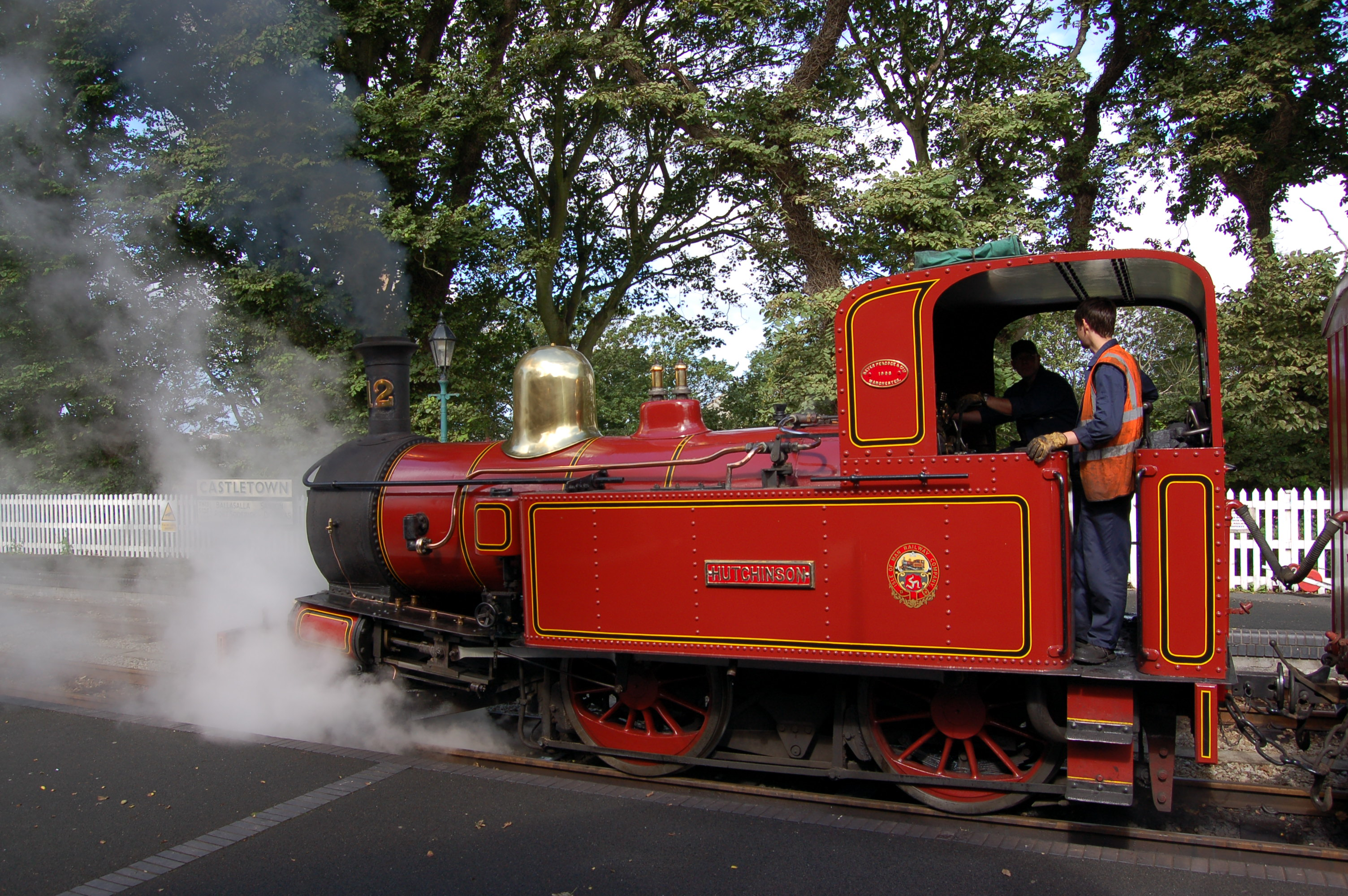
No. 12 Hutchinson at Castletown in 2006 carrying the post-war red livery

The twelfth locomotive was a one-off order, similar in design to Nos. 10 and 11. It was built in 1908 (Beyer Peacock works number 5126) and named after company director W. A. Hutchinson. The locomotive was delivered with Salter safety valves and a deeper-toned whistle than had previously been employed.

The locomotive was rebuilt in 1981 with a new boiler, a new square cab (similar to that of No. 16 Mannin) and a blue livery with no historical precedent. These features gave the loco a unique appearance which was not universally popular. It remained in this form until withdrawn from service for another rebuild, and re-entered traffic in 2001 largely in 1950s condition carrying Indian red livery. Hutchinson was withdrawn again following expiration of its boiler certificate in 2019. As of 2021 work on an overhaul had commenced.

== No. 13 Kissack ==
| No. | Built | Name | Builder | Works No. | Wheel arr | Withdrawn | Status | Livery | Origin of name |
|---|---|---|---|---|---|---|---|---|---|
| No. 13 | 1910 | Kissack | Beyer, Peacock & Company | 5382 | 2-4-0T | 1955–1971, 1992–2006, 2013–2015 | In traffic | Holly green (1873–1945) | Company director, Edward Thomas Kissack |

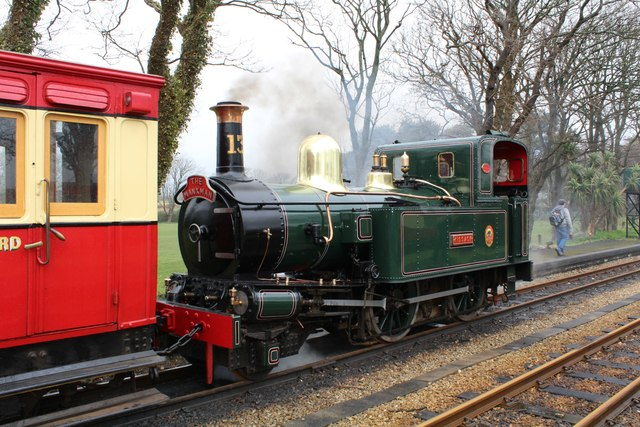
No. 13 Kissack in holly green livery, 2016

Another locomotive was ordered from Beyer Peacock in 1910 (works number 5382) and named after one of the company directors. It is one of the railway's most used locomotives, having seldom been out of service until withdrawn with a defective boiler in 1992.

Kissack was fitted with a new boiler from Hunslet in 1971. When the locomotive was withdrawn from service in 1992 this boiler was refurbished and used to restore No. 10 G.H. Wood. Kissack was dismantled and stored at Douglas. The locomotive returned to steam with a new boiler in 2006, painted in the now standard Indian red livery. It had previously been Brunswick green, which is not thought to have been a historic livery of the railway. It was withdrawn in 2013 for boiler repairs and returned to service in 2015. Since 2016 the locomotive has been in holly green livery.

== No. 14 Thornhill ==
| M.N.R. No. | I.M.R. No. | Built | Name | Builder | Works No. | Wheel arr. | Withdrawn | Status | Livery | Origin of name |
|---|---|---|---|---|---|---|---|---|---|---|
| No. 3 | No. 14 | 1880 | Thornhill | Beyer, Peacock & Company | 2028 | 2-4-0T | 1911–1913, 1930–1930, 1963–Date | Privately owned | Red (1879–1905) | Chairman's residence, Thornhill House |

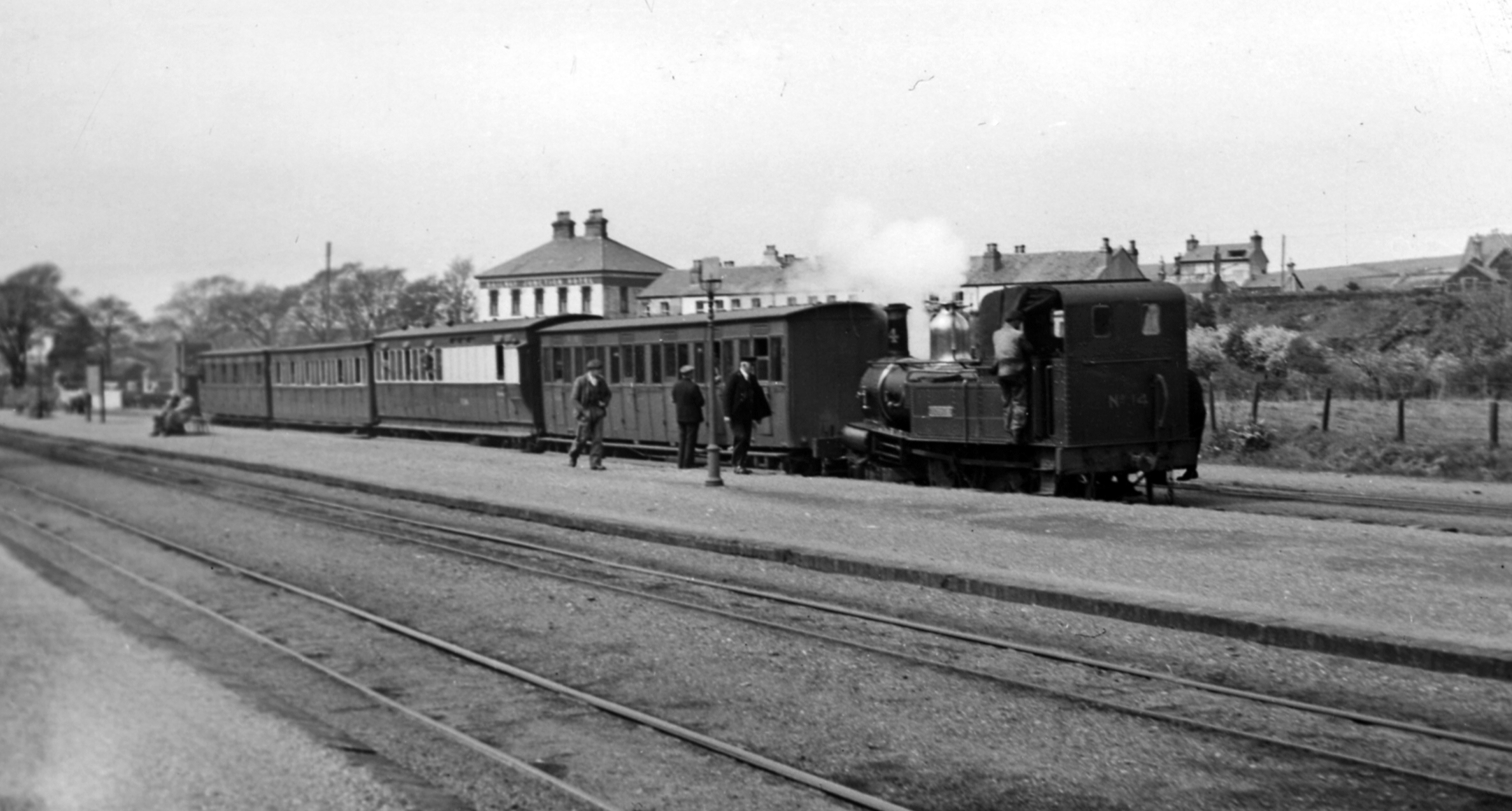
Built as Manx Northern Railway No.3, later No.14 Thornhill at St. John's

This locomotive was supplied to the Manx Northern Railway in 1880, and was identical to IMR No. 7 Tynwald, which was also built by Beyer Peacock at the same time. It was originally MNR No. 3 and after the 1905 takeover by the Isle of Man Railway was renumbered in 1910 as IMR No. 14, but did not carry the new number until 1918.

Thornhill was withdrawn in 1963 and sold in 1978 for private preservation at Lezayre. As of 2021 the locomotive was at the workshops of John Fowler Engineering in Cumbria.

== No. 15 Caledonia ==
| MNR No. | IMR No. | Built | Name | Builder | Works No. | Wheel arr. | Withdrawn | Status | Livery | Origin of name |
|---|---|---|---|---|---|---|---|---|---|---|
| No. 4 | No. 15 | 1885 | Caledonia | Dübs & Co | 2178 | 0-6-0T | 1968–1995, 2008–2013, 2014–2018 | In traffic | Metropolitan red/maroon (1879–1905) | Roman name for Scotland |

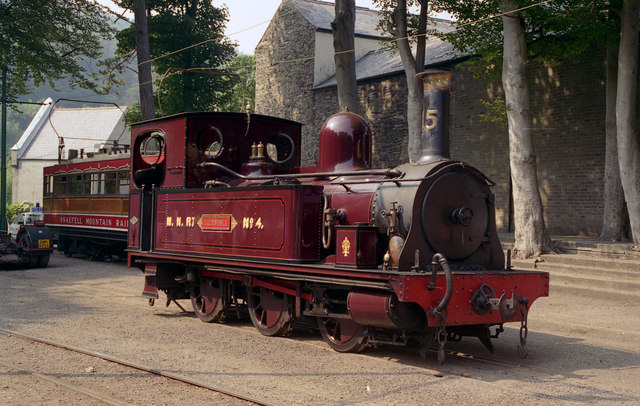
Caledonia at Laxey on the Manx Electric Railway in 1995 during the International Railway Festival celebrations when it operated on both this electric line and the Snaefell Mountain Railway

Caledonia is the only 0-6-0T locomotive on the island and is heavier and more powerful than any other steam locomotive on the island. It was purchased by the Manx Northern Railway from Dübs & Co in 1885 for traffic on the Foxdale Railway, including taking coal from Ramsey up to the Foxdale Mines as well as transporting lead from the mines. After the takeover of the MNR in 1905 Caledonia became No. 15 in the Isle of Man Railway fleet, having previously been Manx Northern's No. 4

Traffic on the Foxdale line did not meet expectations and in 1895 Caledonia was hired out to the contractor building the Snaefell Mountain Railway and shipped to Laxey. To allow operation of the 3 ft (914 mm) gauge locomotive on the 3 ft 6 in (1,067 mm) gauge railway a temporary third rail was laid. During 1914–1918 the locomotive was hired out again, this time to the government for use on the branch line from Peel to Knockaloe Internment Camp. As the most powerful locomotive on the system it was the best suited to the branch's steep gradients. Caledonia was considered too heavy for general use, and its longer wheelbase was less suitable for sharp curves than the other locomotives. As a result it only saw sporadic use, notably on Ramsey Cattle Mart specials, snow clearing trains and transporting mining spoil from Foxdale for building aerodrome runways during World War II.

In 1926 the locomotive received a new boiler with "Ross" pop safety valves and it was rebuilt again in 1943. When the Marquess of Ailsa took over operations in 1967 it was repainted into a spring green livery and saw service on passenger trains. Caledonia remained in service until 1968 and was placed on display, in its original MNR dark red livery, at the Railway Museum from 1975. The locomotive returned to service in 1994 and as part of the International Railway Festival in 1995 it hauled passenger trains on the Snaefell Mountain Railway and the Manx Electric Railway.

The locomotive was withdrawn in 2008 for a major rebuild and returned to service in 2013. It was prematurely withdrawn from service in 2014 with boiler problems. The overhauled boiler was returned from the Severn Valley Railway in April 2018 and the locomotive was returned to steam in September 2018.

== No. 16 Mannin ==
| No. | Built | Name | Builder | Works No. | Wheel arr. | Withdrawn | Status | Livery | Origin of name |
|---|---|---|---|---|---|---|---|---|---|
| No. 16 | 1926 | Mannin | Beyer, Peacock & Company | 6296 | 2-4-0T | 1941–1944, 1950–1951, 1964–Date | Under restoration | None | Manx for Isle of Man |

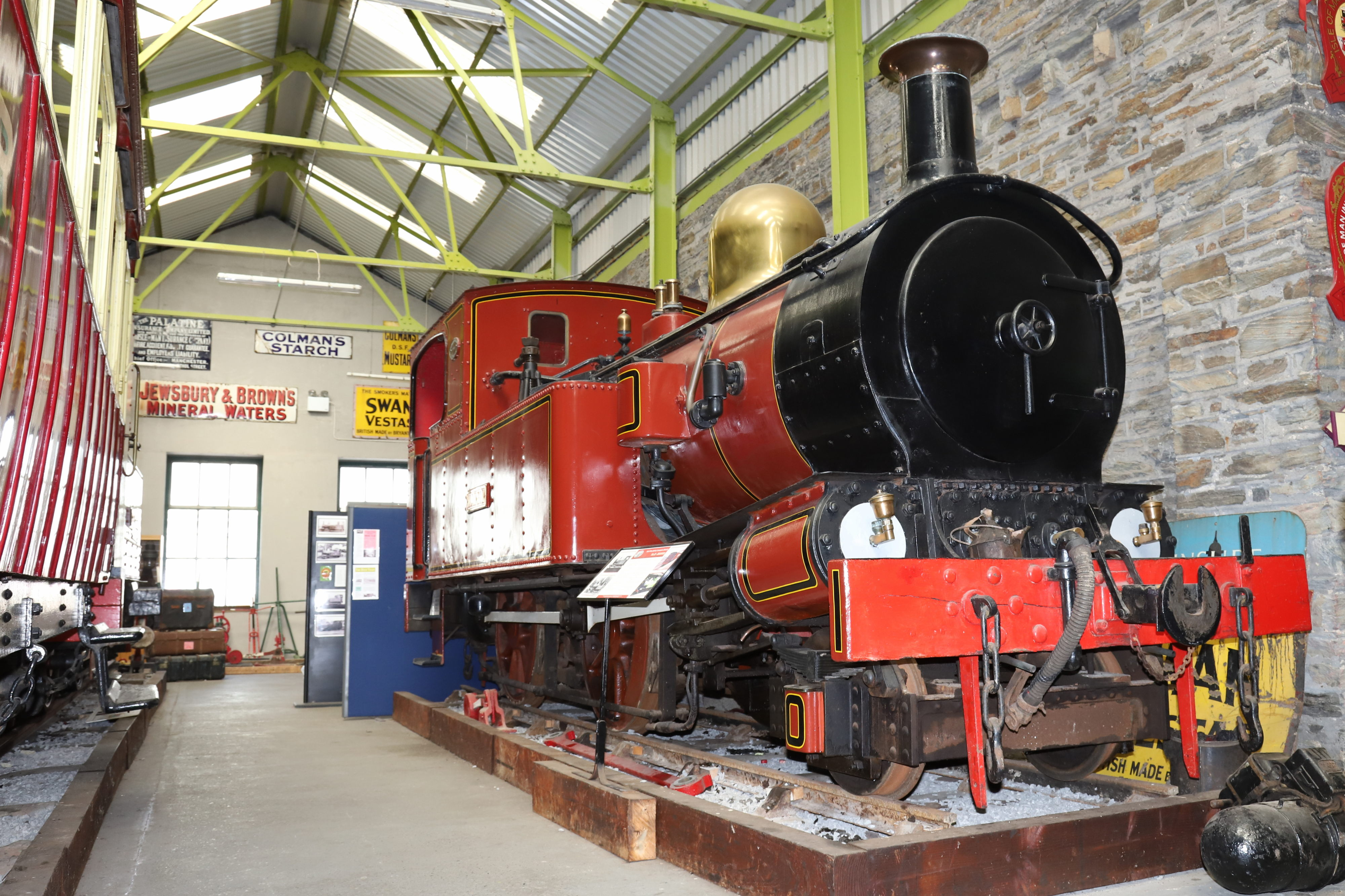
No.16 Mannin on display at Port Erin Railway Museum in 2018

The last steam locomotive to be supplied to the railway was No. 16 Mannin, built in 1926 by Beyer Peacock. Mannin was the most powerful 2-4-0T locomotive on the line and was purchased to haul the heavy traffic on the line to Port Erin, a job which had previously taken two locomotives either double-headed or banked. Compared to the older locomotives, No. 16 had a larger diameter boiler (3 ft 6 in) which operated at a higher pressure (180 psi (1,200 kPa)), and larger cylinders (12 in × 18 in (300 mm × 460 mm) bore × stroke). It was also fitted with vacuum brakes and steam sanders from new.

The locomotive was mainly used on the Port Erin line and also worked special trains to St John's for Tynwald Day. Outside the holiday season the service to Port Erin was much reduced (partially because there was no boat train) and Mannin was stored in the locomotive shed at Port Erin railway station. It spent its last few years used as a Douglas-based engine on the Peel line, when the maximum boiler pressure was reduced due to poor condition, which would have dramatically reduced performance. It probably never travelled north of Kirk Michael on the Ramsey line, with no photographic evidence to support this.

Mannin remained in service until 1964 and in 1975 was placed on display at the Railway Museum. The locomotive's non-standard design meant it was not considered for restoration until 2019. It was removed from the museum for assessment in 2020. It was planned to restore the locomotive for the railway's 150th anniversary celebrations in 2023, however as of 2023 the restoration was not expected to be complete until 2026.

== No. 17 Viking ==
| No. | Built | Name | Builder | Works No. | Withdrawn | Status | Livery | Origin of name |
|---|---|---|---|---|---|---|---|---|
| No. 17 | 1958 | Viking | Schöma | 2066 | 2012–Date | Stored | Spring green | Originally intended for No. 3 Pender |

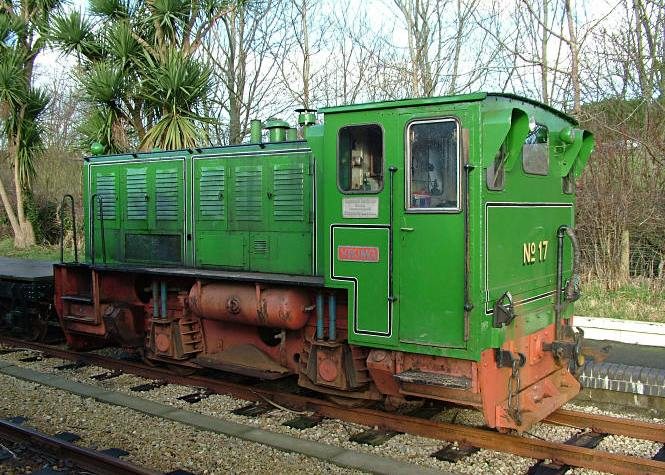
No. 17 Viking on departmental duties at Santon in 2008, showing the spring green livery

This locomotive was built by Schöma of Germany in 1958 for the Braunschweigische Kohlenbergwerke, an opencast lignite mine in Helmstedt, Germany, where it had fleet number 208 and ran on 900 mm (2 ft 11 7/16 in) gauge track. It was purchased by the Isle of Man Railway in 1992, mainly for use on works trains to replace the railcars Nos. 19 and 20. On the Isle of Man the locomotive was numbered 17 and in 1993 it was named Viking, following a competition in the local schools to choose a name. This was the name originally planned for No. 3 Pender. When it entered service in 1993 Viking carried a Brunswick green livery. In 2003 it was repainted in a lighter spring green livery, but still with a red chassis and buffer beams.

Whilst usually restricted to non-passenger services, No. 17 saw some use in passenger traffic during 2010 owing to steam locomotive failure. In October 2012, it was announced that a replacement diesel engine had been ordered to replace Viking, with delivery expected in Spring 2013. As of 2017 Viking was stored at Douglas after not running since at least 2014, and its future was uncertain.

== No. 18 Ailsa ==
| Fleet No. | Built | Name | Builder | Works No. | Withdrawn | Status | Livery | Origin of name |
|---|---|---|---|---|---|---|---|---|
| No. 18 | 1994 | Ailsa | Hunslet Engine Company | LD9342 | - | in use | Fordson blue | Archibald Kennedy, 7th Marquess of Ailsa |

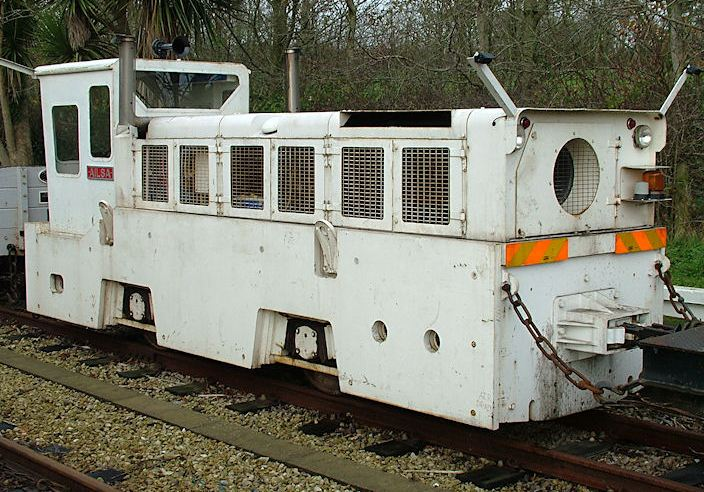
No. 18 Ailsa in its plain white colour scheme

This locomotive was built by Hunslet in 1994 for use during the construction of the Jubilee line extension of the London Underground. It was later used by the contractors who re-laid approximately two-thirds of the Port Erin line in conjunction with the IRIS project, which saw a sewerage pipeline being laid beneath the railway in 2000–2002. Upon completion of the work the locomotive was bought from the contractors and named Ailsa after the Marquess of Ailsa, who had greatly contributed to the railway in the late 1960s.

At first the locomotive remained in plain white livery until the removal of some of its ballast weights resulted in a rust-red lower half with a white top. In November 2024 it was repainted blue with red buffer beams.

The locomotive has a somewhat squat appearance because it was originally built to work on construction railways, although the cab was extended upwards before its arrival on island. The limited visibility for the driver has seen it fitted with closed circuit television cameras to aid vision. This disability, the absence of a continuous vacuum brake system and a mechanically governed top speed of 25 km/h (16 mph) make the locomotive unsuitable for passenger workings and it is mostly used on shunting and permanent way duties.

== No. 19 and No. 20 diesel railcars ==
| No. | Built | Name | Builder | Works No. | Withdrawn | Status | Livery |
|---|---|---|---|---|---|---|---|
| No. 19 | 1950 | None | Walker Brothers | C/N-7989 | 1998–Date | Partially restored | None |
| No. 20 | 1951 | None | Walker Brothers | C/N-83149 | 1998–Date | Partially restored | None |

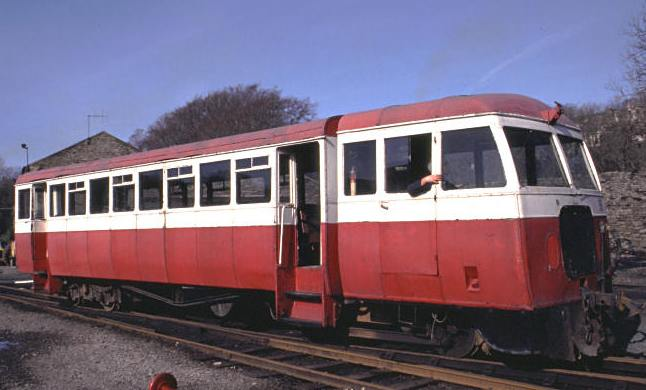
One of the diesel railcars in the yard at Douglas in 1993, at which point they were only used for shunting duties.

These two diesel railcars were built for the County Donegal Railways Joint Committee (CDR), where they entered service in 1950 and 1951. The mechanical parts were manufactured by Walker Brothers and the bodywork by the Great Northern Railway (Ireland). They are articulated with a full-width cab unit at one end and a separate 41-seat carriage section. After the CDR closed in 1959 the rolling stock was sold and the IMR purchased the two newest railcars. They arrived in Douglas in May 1961 and were overhauled and entered service on the Peel line in 1962. As the railcars had only one cab they were coupled back-to-back and ran as a pair, sometimes with a goods van between them. As the transmissions only had a single reverse gear the leading railcar had to haul the weight of the other. This caused adhesion problems on the line to Port Erin and the railcars ran mostly on the lines to Peel and Ramsey. The railcar's CDR fleet numbers were retained, leaving a gap in the IMR numbering sequence until the arrival of No. 18 Ailsa in 2005.

From the 1970s the railcars were only used for permanent way duties, not passenger services, and in the 1990s they were withdrawn from service for restoration. The railcars were the subject of controversy in the late 1990s when their over-budget rebuild was halted, and since this time no work has been done on them. As of 2019 they remain in store at Douglas station awaiting completion.

== No. 21 Diesel-electric ==
| No. | Built | Name | Builder | Works No. | Withdrawn | Status | Livery |
|---|---|---|---|---|---|---|---|
| No. 21 | 2013 | None | Motive Power & Equipment Solutions | MP550-B1 | 2013–2015, 2015–2019, 2019–2021, 2021–date | Undergoing attention | Green |

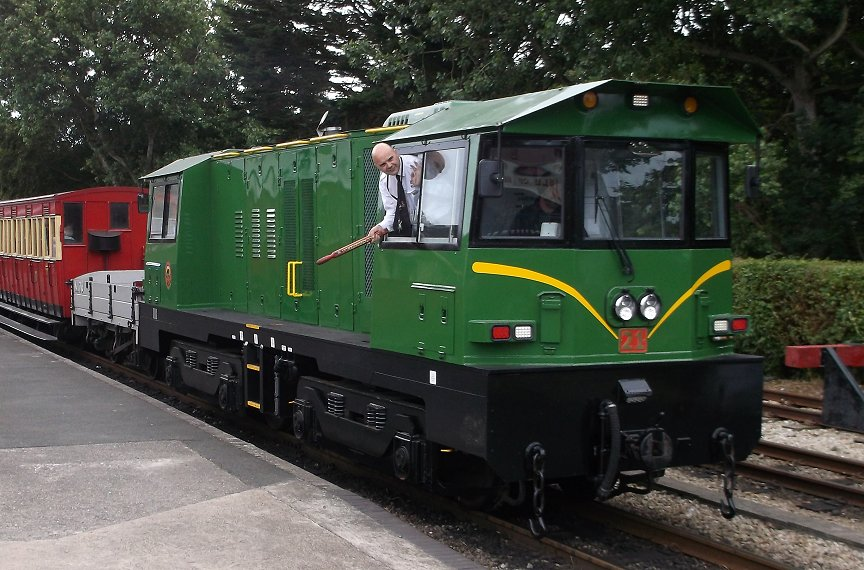
No. 21 in service with a mixed train at Port Erin in July 2014 as part of the annual transport festival

The diesel-electric locomotive No. 21 was delivered in December 2013 as a replacement for No. 17 Viking. Its duties were intended to include shunting, maintenance trains, TT commuter services and recovering other broken down trains. The locomotive has a cab at each end, weighs 42.5 tons and has a maximum speed of 40 mph (64 km/h).

It had originally been planned to spend £700,000 on a new locomotive, but Tynwald only approved £400,000 of funding. Second-hand locomotives from Russia or Romania were investigated. A new locomotive was preferred because it would have a better control system and better availability of spare parts. No. 21 was built by Motive Power & Equipment Solutions in South Carolina using refurbished bogies and traction motors with new bodywork, Cummins QSX15 diesel engine, alternator and controls.

Since its delivery the locomotive has suffered from a range of technical problems. After overheating problems, a new prime mover was supplied by the manufacturer under warranty. A loose wheel led to the bogies being rebuilt. After being out of service from 2015, the locomotive finally entered regular service in August 2019, before a "power problem" in October that year caused it to be left in sidings at Castletown. As of 2024 No. 21 had worked for a total of 31 days, with £249,000 spent on repairs and a further £40,000 necessary to return the locomotive to service.

== No. 22 and No. 23 Wickham trolleys ==
| No. | Built | Name | Builder | Works No. | Status | Livery | Other notes |
|---|---|---|---|---|---|---|---|
| - | 19?? | None | Wickham of Ware | ???? | Scrapped | Formerly red and white | Ex-Queen's Pier, Ramsey |
| No. 22 | 1956 | None | Wickham of Ware | 7442 | In traffic | Holly green | Restored 2014-2015 |
| No. 23 | 1961 | None | Wickham of Ware | 8849 | In traffic | Holly green | Restored 2013 and 2025 |

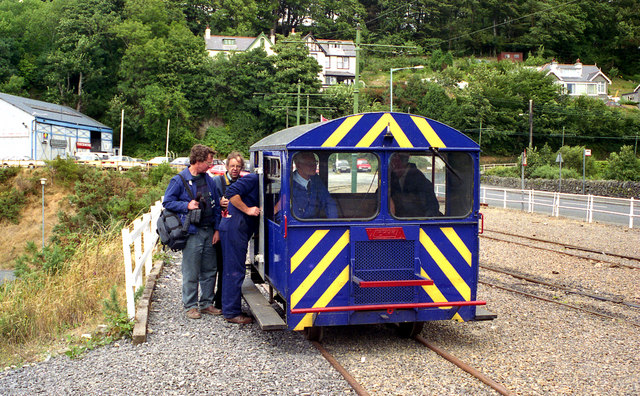
No. 23 giving rides at Laxey as part of the International Railway Festival in 1995.

A Wickham-built four-wheel railcar from the Queen's Pier Tramway in Ramsey was brought to the railway in 1975 for use when the Peel and Ramsey lines were lifted. It has since been scrapped, although some parts remain in storage at Douglas.

A further two Wickham railcars have since been acquired. These are No. 22, bought in 1978 from the Lochaber Narrow Gauge Railway, and No. 23. They are normally used for permanent way duties but also offer passenger rides during the Heritage Transport Festival. They are often transferred between the Manx Electric Railway and the steam railway as required.

No. 22 was restored to original condition in 2014 with internal bench seating and canvas side curtains. It is frequently for weed-spraying trains, fire-fighting trains and line inspections after bad weather. No. 23 was rebuilt in 2013 with a petrol engine and plywood sides and is generally stored out of use in the workshops at Douglas.

== No. 24 and No. 25 Simplexes ==
| No. | Built | Name | Builder | Works No. | Status | Livery | Other notes |
|---|---|---|---|---|---|---|---|
| No. 24 | 1959 | Betsy | Motor Rail | 22021 | In traffic | Oxford blue | Cabless |
| No. 25 | 1966 | Sprout | Motor Rail | 40S280 | In traffic | Holly green | Carries driver's cab |

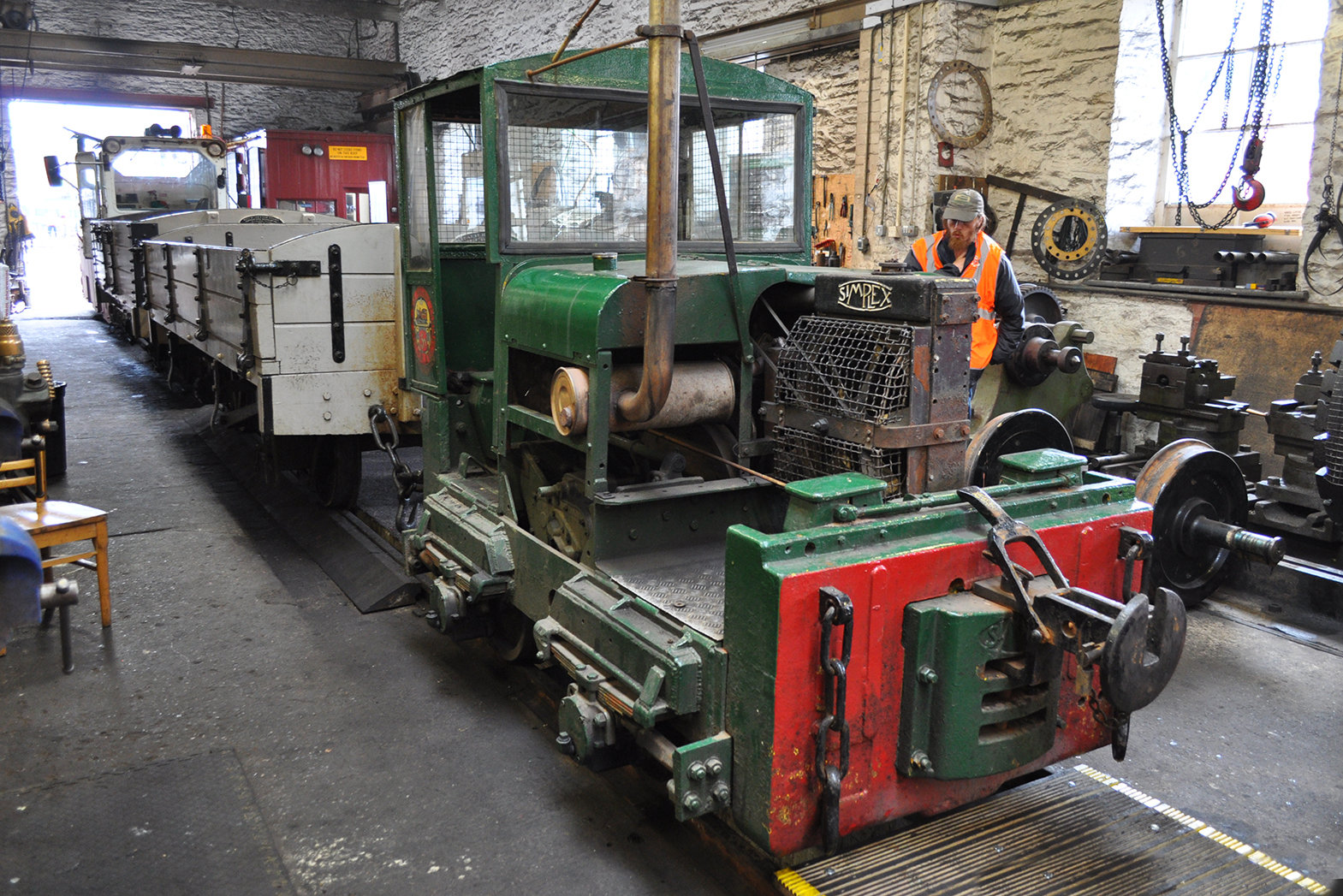
No. 25 in the workshops at Douglas showing its cab, which does not feature on No. 24

There are two small Simplex locomotives on the railway. No. 24 is based at Port Erin for daily shunting purposes during the operating season. No. 25 other can be found occasionally on the Manx Electric Railway or stored at Douglas. In the past both units have seen periodic use on the electric railway

No. 24 was repainted in September 2018 and received a fleet number and painted-on name for the first time. It has no cab but is fitted with an electric starter. No. 25 has a driver's cab and carries fleet details on its bonnet in yellow with crests on the cab sides. It was fitted with a replacement cab in 2022 with the same appearance as the original but remains with a hand-cranked starter. It is now painted green but previously had an all-over yellow livery with red chevrons.

== Ex-Bord na Móna diesel locomotives ==
| No. | Built | Name | Builder | Wheel arr. | Status | Livery | Other notes |
|---|---|---|---|---|---|---|---|
| T.B.A. | 1980 | Pig | Bord na Móna | 0-4-0 | Stored? | Yellow | Formerly LM344 |
| T.B.A. | 1994 | T.B.A. | Bord na Móna | 0-4-0 | undergoing assessment | Brown and cream | Formerly LM389 |
| T.B.A. | 1995 | T.B.A. | Bord na Móna | 0-4-0 | undergoing assessment | Brown and cream | Formerly LM396 |

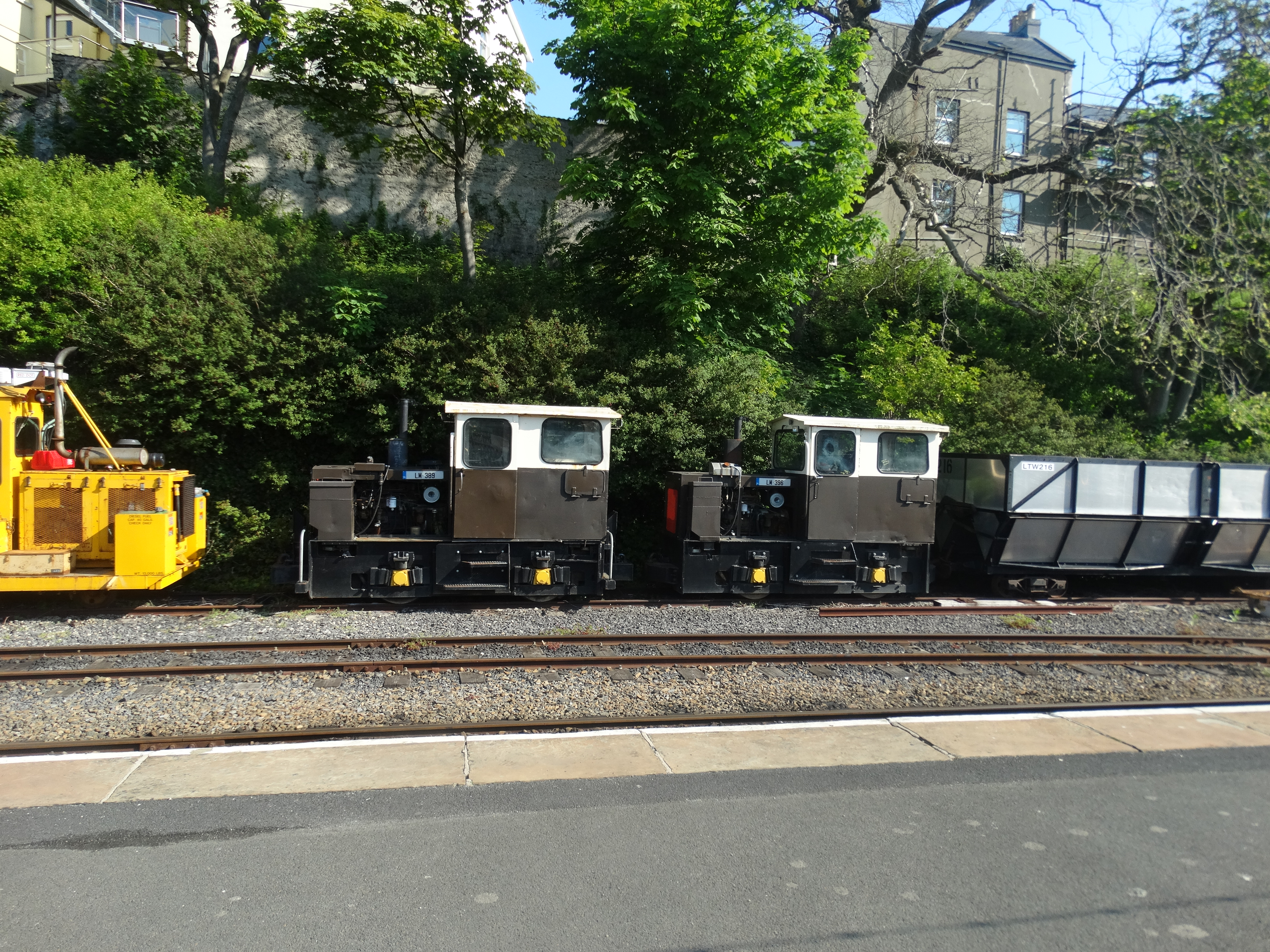
The two Bord na Móna locomotives at Douglas station in May 2025

In 2024 two small diesel-hydraulic locomotives were acquired second-hand from Bord na Móna in Ireland, whose 3 ft gauge industrial railway system was being closed down due to the end of peat harvesting. The locomotives were originally built in 1994 and 1995 and they were refurbished before being exported from Ireland to the Isle of Man. The locomotives are intended for shunting and track maintenance duties. A number of wagons were acquired at the same time. Each locomotive's engine produces around 100 hp (75 kW). As of June 2025 the locomotives are in the workshops undergoing assessment.

== The "Sharpies" ==
| M.N.R. No. | I.M.R. No. | Built | Builder | Name | Works No. | Withdrawn | Status | Livery | Origin of name |
|---|---|---|---|---|---|---|---|---|---|
| No. 1 | None | 1879 | Sharp, Stewart and Company | Ramsey | 2885 | 1917 | Scrapped | | Headquarters of MNR at Ramsey |
| No. 2 | None | 1879 | Sharp, Stewart and Company | Northern | 2886 | 1922 | Scrapped | | North of island |

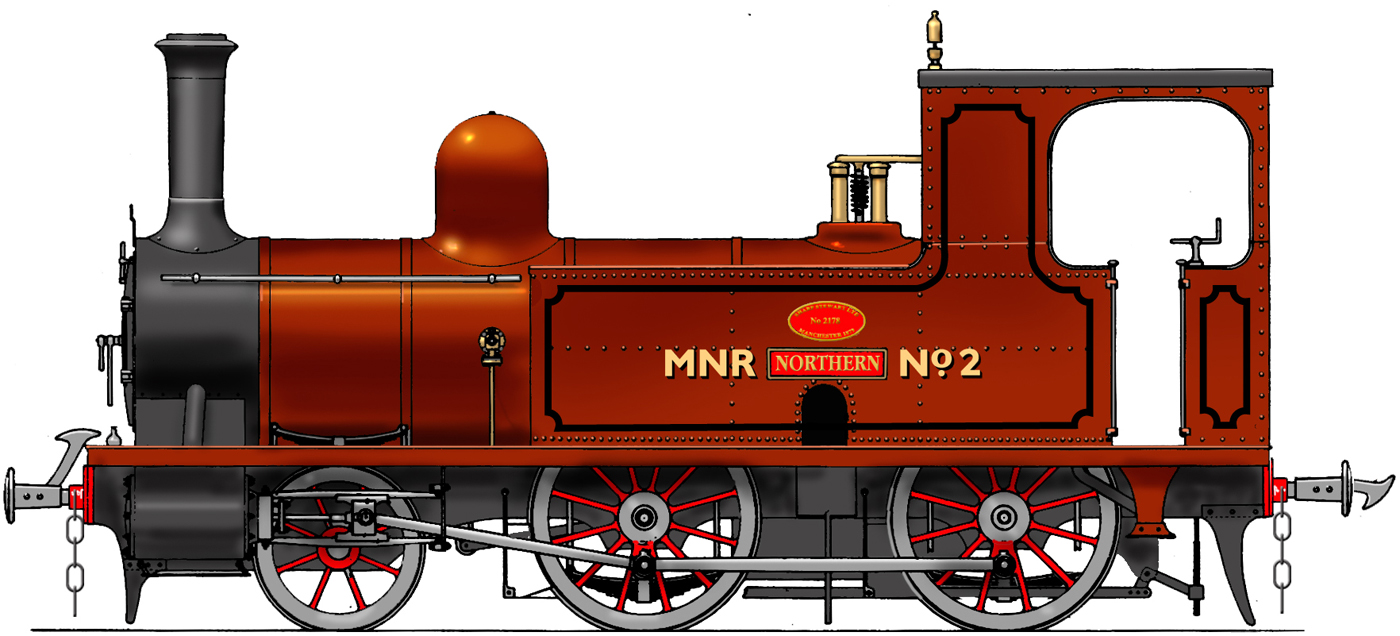
Manx Northern No. 2 Northern

The Manx Northern Railway's first engines were two 2-4-0 side tank locomotives were provided by Sharp, Stewart and Company for the line's opening in 1879. They were named Ramsey and Northern in 1893. Their dimensions were similar to the Beyer Peacock locomotives built for the IMR, however in their use of a leading radial axle (rather than a Bissell truck) and other features they were more conventional examples of mid-Victorian locomotive design. The locomotives were tested at speeds up to 45 mph (72 km/h) before their entry into service. There have been some suggestions that their shorter wheelbase (11 ft 6 in (3.51 m) as opposed to 13 ft 9 in (4.19 m) for the Beyer Peacock locomotives) made them less than steady at higher speeds.

Both locomotives were fitted with new boilers in 1893 and in 1897 Ramsey was hired to the IOMT&EP Co. to work on the construction of the Manx Electric Railway between Ramsey and Laxey.

After the takeover of the MNR by the Isle of Man Railway in 1905 these two locomotives were never re-numbered, unlike the other two Manx Northern locomotives, and saw very little use. Northern was scrapped in 1912. Ramsey was used to haul permanent way trains at Port Erin in the 1910s and the railway attempted to sell it in 1919 before the locomotive was scrapped in 1923.

== Boiler variants ==
All of the Isle of Man Railway locomotives and Manx Northern No. 3 Thornhill were 2-4-0T locomotives with a leading pony truck and outside cylinders. They were built by Beyer Peacock, based on the NSB Class IV locomotives which the company first supplied in 1866 for the 3 ft 6 in (1,067 mm) gauge lines of the Norwegian State Railways. The degree of standardisation of the Beyer Peacock locomotives made it possible to move parts between them when they were rebuilt.

The Manx locomotives came in three principal variants. The ten "small boiler" locomotives consisted of Nos. 1–9, and Manx Northern No. 3 (later Isle of Man Railway No. 14). These locomotives had a 6 ft 3 in (1,900 mm) coupled wheelbase, 3 ft 9 in (1,140 mm) driving wheels and 11 by 18 in (280 by 460 mm) cylinders. As built, were fitted with 2 ft 10 3/4 in (883 mm) diameter boilers. The boiler pressure was 120 psi (830 kPa) for Nos. 1–7 and 14, which was increased to 160 psi (1,100 kPa) for Nos. 8 and 9. The first three locomotives had 320 imp gal (1,500 L) side tanks. For Nos. 4–9 this was increased to 385 imp gal (1,750 L).

Nos. 10–13 constitute the "medium boiler" series. For these locomotives the boilers were enlarged to 3 ft 3 in (990 mm) diameter, the coupled wheelbase was extended to 6 ft 6 in (1,980 mm) and the side tanks were increased to 480 imp gal (2,200 L) capacity. The driving wheel diameter remained 3 ft 9 in and the cylinders were still 11 in by 18 in. The small boiler locomotives were rebuilt with larger boilers to match the medium boiler series. Nos 4–6 were also fitted with the larger 480 gal tanks.

No. 16 is the solitary example of the "large boiler" variant, with its 3 ft 6 in (1,070 mm) diameter, 180 psi boiler, 12 by 18 in (300 by 460 mm) cylinders and 520 imp gal (2,400 L) tanks. It has the same 6 ft 6 in coupled wheelbase and 3 ft 9 in driving wheels as the medium boiler locomotives.

== Liveries ==
The original company livery was a green colour. At first the lining was black lining with a thin vermilion line inside and a thin white line outside, but this later changed to black with vermilion on both sides. This remained the standard livery until 1944, when the standard livery changed to Indian red, lined out white-black-white. The Indian red paint was produced in the railway's workshop and tended to oxidise over time. Recently repainted locomotives would be a deep red colour with a bit of orange; those that had not visited the paint shop in some time would be a reddish brown.

When the line re-opened in 1967 with Lord Ailsa as chairman the service locomotives (Nos. 5, 8, 10, 11, 12 and 15) were repainted into a light spring green livery. This was very similar to the apple green used by the London and North Eastern Railway. The reason given is that the Rev. Teddy Boston, a friend of Lord Ailsa had a 4 mm scale model of an Isle of Man locomotive that he had painted in LNER colours. This was shown to Ailsa who liked it and had the locomotives repainted to match.

Spring green remained the standard livery until nationalisation, when it was decided to repaint all the locomotives in different colours. During this period No. 4 Loch, No. 12 Hutchinson and No. 13 Kissack appeared in red, green and blue liveries. This variety of liveries continued in use until 1999, when the arrival of new management resulted in all locomotives being painted in the post-war Indian red livery. No. 10 G.H. Wood was out-shopped in spring green in 2007 to mark the 40th anniversary of the takeover by Lord Ailsa.

The original livery of the Manx Northern Railway locomotives was Tuscan red, as used by the Metropolitan Railway, with black lining with narrow vermilion lines either side. Caledonia was repainted in this livery in 2013.

The railcars from the County Donegal Railway were in a red and cream colour scheme when they arrived on the island in 1961. They kept this until 1977 when they were repainted into a version of the then-standard dark red and cream carriage livery. This differed from the carriages in that cream was used only for the waist stripe, whilst the window surrounds were painted deep red. The railcars remained in this livery until 1988 when they were repainted with a red and white scheme, the same as that carried by the island's buses at the time.

== Idiosyncrasies ==
Whilst all from the same manufacturer broadly to the same design, the Beyer, Peacocks all have slight differences; for example, the first three have their nameplates mounted forward of the injector feed pipe, whereas Nos. 4 and 5 are central, meaning the name plates unusually read "LO CH" and "MO NA", because of a gap where the pipe passes through. All Isle of Man Railway locomotives were supplied with brass chimney numerals, whilst the ex-MNR engines received them following the 1905 merger. Today No. 10 does not carry any chimney numerals, and No. 15 had its taken off when it was returned to Manx Northern Railway No. 4 in 2007; when it returned to traffic in 1995 it carried both numbers at once.

In 1946, Beyer Peacock supplied three boilers with new cast iron chimneys which were not fitted with numerals. These boilers were fitted to Nos. 5, 10, and 12, which lost their chimney numerals as a result. It was at this point that No. 5 and No. 12 gained small tank side number plates. No. 12 lost them again when reboilered in 1981. Over the years, the water tanks of each loco were patched when they leaked, resulting in each one being distinctive by their pattern of patches; this is not noticeable today as the tanks are welded, and the rivets are only dummies for aesthetic purposes. No. 6 Peveril in the museum does however retain it patched tanks. There are several other differences, such as the grab rail on the back of No. 5's cab being a different style to all the others, No. 11 having a brass safety valve bonnet (at one time carried by No. 13 have been recycled from a pre-1939 boiler fitted to No. 13 prior to it 1971 reboilering), No. 4 featuring fleet number and three legs of man in brass on the buffer beam.

== Whistles ==
The stable of Beyer, Peacock locomotives carry standard whistles, which can be classified as high, medium and low. The medium tone of whistle is more commonplace for the simple reason that whenever a new boiler was supplied it came with a whistle. The higher "pea" whistle on the pre-1905 locomotives also has two variants, with 1-6 being higher than 7-9 and the whistle carried by No. 4 Loch from 1978 to 1995 being the highest. The third, much deeper tone of whistle was carried by Nos. 12 and 13 upon delivery, but this was changed so to a more standard version by the 1950s.

When No. 13 was rebuilt in 1971 a new deeper whistle was provided by Hunslet, and when No. 12 was extensively overhauled in 2001 it was fitted with the original deeper whistle, later being replaced by the medium toned one. Until withdrawal No. 4, known for the distinctive high pitch whistle, had been replaced with a medium tone one, leaving only No. 8 Fenella and Caledonia with a shrill whistle. It is not known what type of whistles were carried by the scrapped Sharp, Stewart locomotives. On occasion, such as at Thomas Days, Santa Specials and the end of season trains, staff members put their own whistles on locomotives, such as triple-chimes but these were never fitted to the locomotives originally.

== See also ==
- Isle of Man Railway stations
- Isle of Man Railway rolling stock

== Bibliography ==
- James I.C. Boyd, Isle Of Man Railway, Volume 3, The Routes & Rolling Stock (1996) ISBN 0-85361-479-2
- Norman Jones Scenes from the Past: Isle of Man Railway (1994) ISBN 1-870119-22-3
- Robert Hendry, Rails in the Isle of Man: A Colour Celebration (1993) ISBN 1-85780-009-5
- A.M Goodwyn, Manx Transport Kaleidoscope, 2nd Edition (1995)
- David Lloyd-Jones, Manx Peacocks: A Profile of Steam on the Isle of Man Railway (1998) ISBN 0 906899 958
