= Port Erin railway station =

Railway station in Isle of Man, the UK

Port Erin Railway Station Stashoon Raad-Yiarn Phurt Çhiarn
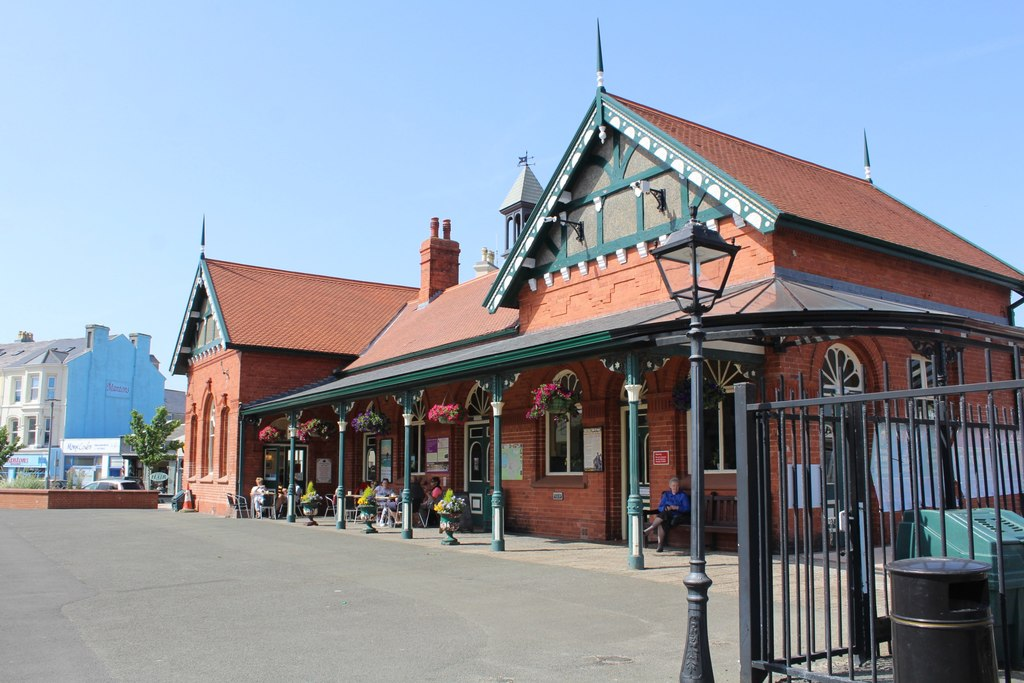

General information
- Location: Station Road, Port Erin, Isle of Man, IM9 6AE
- Coordinates: 54.085°N 4.758°W
- System: The Isle of Man Railway Co., Ltd.
- Owner: Isle of Man Government, Department of Infrastructure
- Lines: Port Erin (South) Line between Douglas and Port Erin
- Platforms: Main & Bay
- Tracks: Running Line & Sidings

Construction
- Structure type: Station building, goods shed, loco shed, carriage shed
- Parking: Adjacent
- Accessible: 1

History
- Opened: 1 August 1874
- Closed: Seasonally (Since 1965)
- Rebuilt: 1894 / 1903 / 1975 / 2016

Passengers
- Passenger only (since 1969, goods previously)

Services
Patrons' toilets, waiting room, booking facilities, coffee shop, historical displays, dedicated museum
Location

Port Erin Railway Station (Manx: Stashoon Raad Yiarn Phurt Çhiarn) is the western terminus of the Isle of Man Railway in the village of Port Erin on the Isle of Man; it is the sole remaining outer terminus of the railway. Until 1968 there were termini at both Peel and Ramsey in the west and north of the island respectively. This station was the second established terminus of the Isle of Man Railway: the first opened at Peel in 1873.

== Establishment ==
The railway initially considered building its southern route only as far as Castletown which had served as the capital of the Island and seat of parliament until the previous decade and is located 7 kilometres (4.3 mi) to the east of Port Erin, but due to increasing tourism on the island, especially at the seaside resorts of Port Erin and the nearby Port St. Mary, the line was extended all the way from Douglas to Port Erin, a distance of 25 kilometres (16 mi). Deviations to include Castletown were drawn up as an alternative plan also saw the town bypassed completed by a landward route between Ballasalla and Ballabeg.

However, the new terminus station soon established itself and became a focal point in the village, and it maintains this status today. Facilities were considerably expanded between 1902 and 1909, the site expanding to its greatest extent before the start of the First World War. Despite this, deposited plans and some even later documents refer to the line as the "Castletown Line" including those provided for the new signal box at Douglas which date to 1890.

== Original Station ==
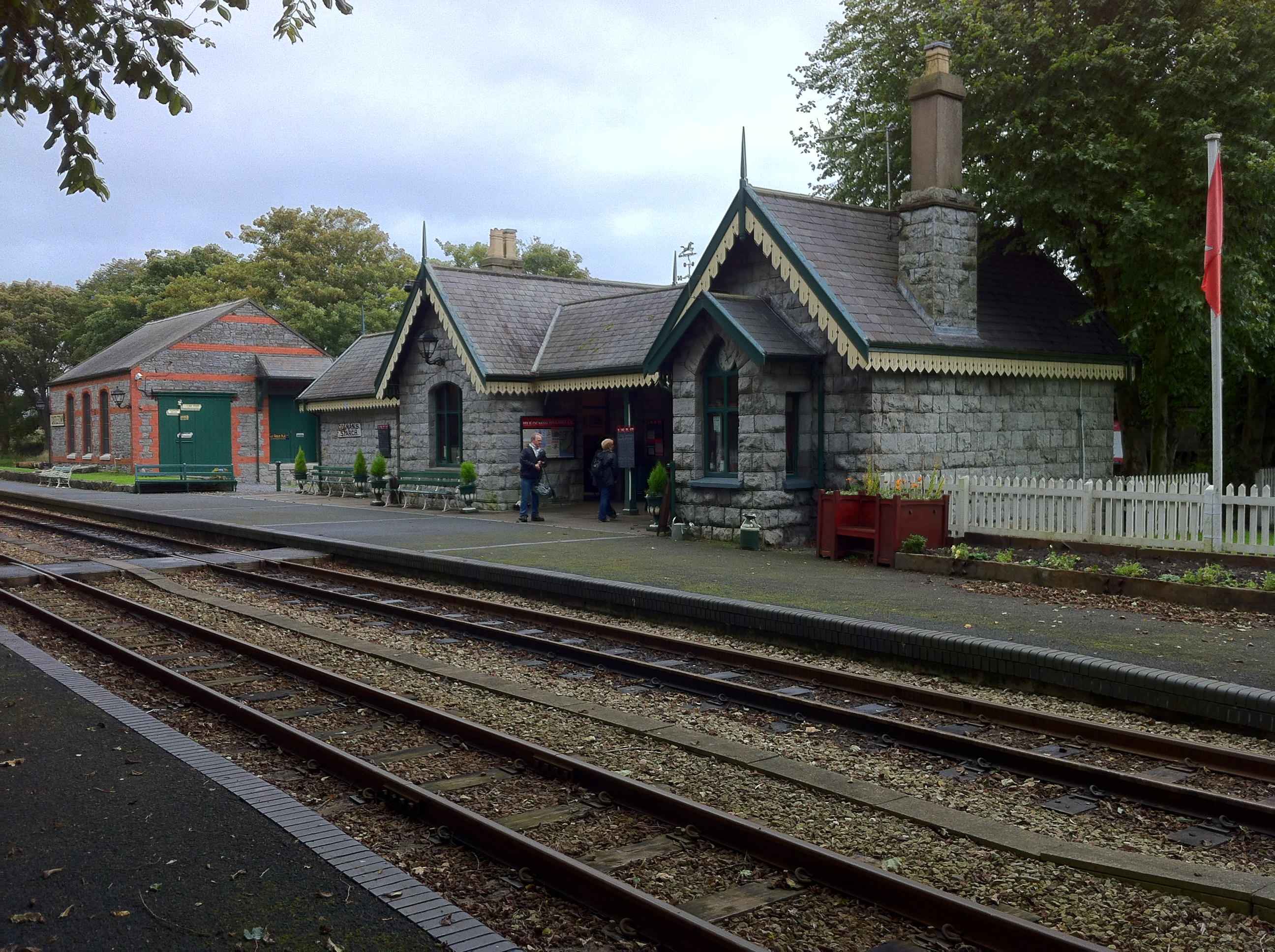
The surviving station at Castletown was built to the same design of that at Port Erin but in local limestone whereas that at Port Erin was of slate construction; its deemed to be too small for requirements by the turn of the century

On opening, the Port Erin terminus consisted of the mainline, a run-round loop, departure siding, and two further sidings one serving the original locomotive shed and the other for goods. The original station building was almost identical to the one that survives at Castletown, but was constructed of slate rubble. Until the beginning of the 20th century, the station facilities were all to the west of the pedestrian level crossing that bisects the later Edwardian station. The rather limited facilities reflected both the comparative newness of Port Erin as a seaside resort in the early 1870s, and also the financial difficulties faced by the railway in completing the line. However, after the opening of the railway, Port Erin developed rapidly, overwhelming the original facilities which were systematically replaced 1902-1905, with further extensions in 1912 and 1914.

== Replacement Station (1909) ==
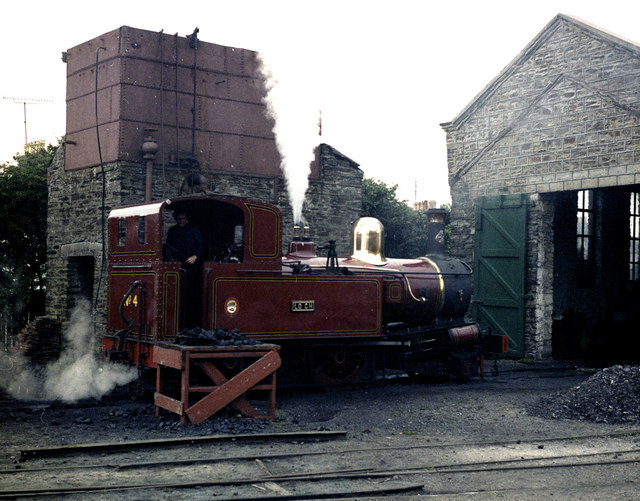
No.4 Loch outside the locomotive shed in 1979 with the original water tower in the background, demolished in 1986, Heritage Year

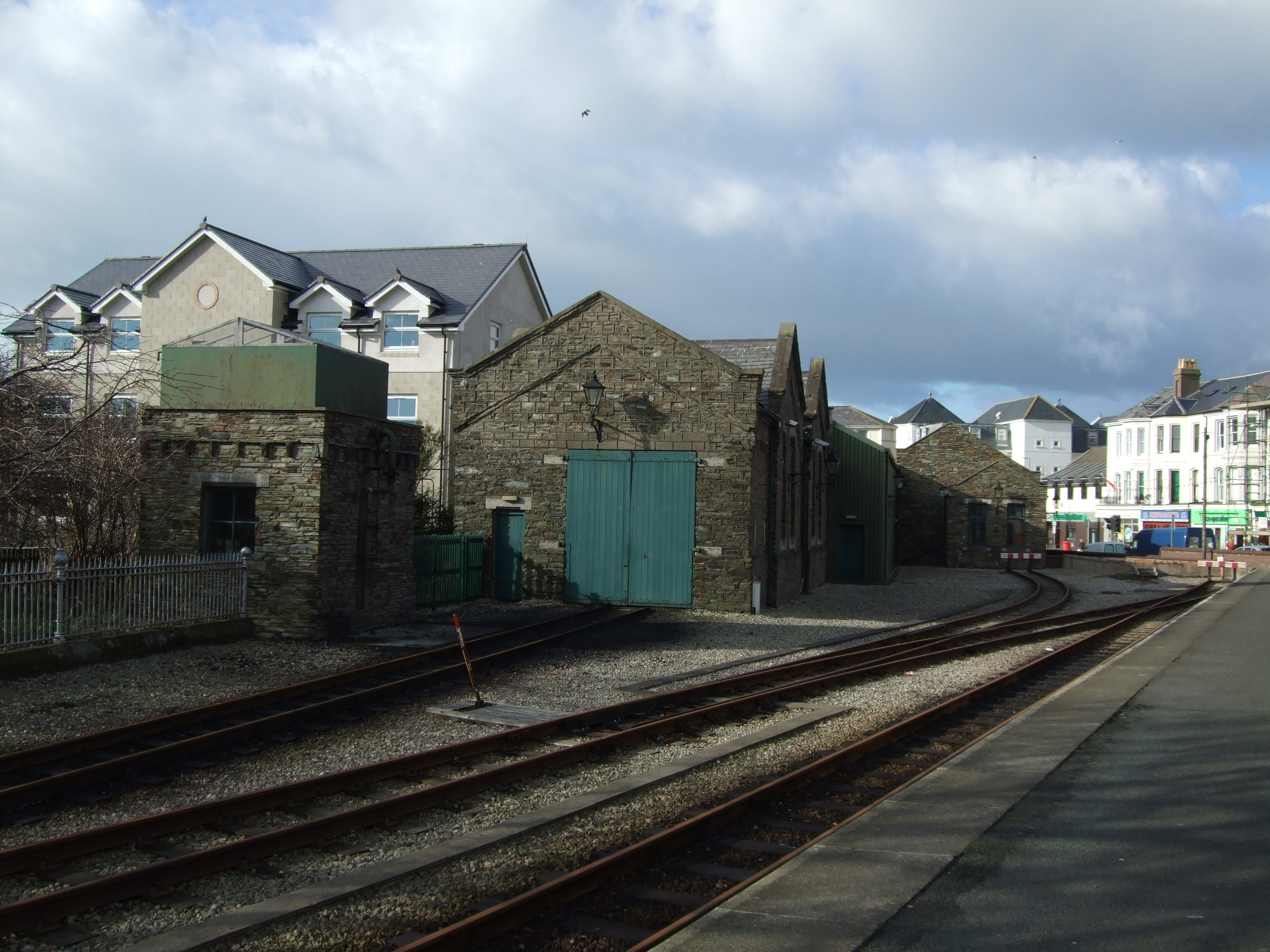
An overview of the yard showing the locomotive shed, replacement water tower and goods shed in the distance in 2012

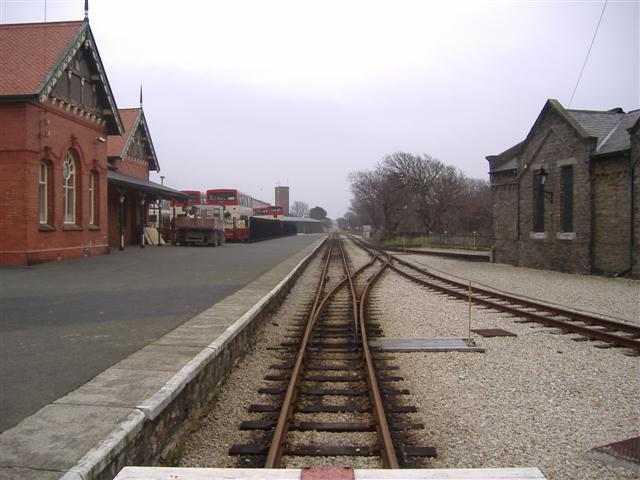
Viewed from the buffers showing the layout of the site with the 1909 station to the left and locomotive shed to the right in 2006

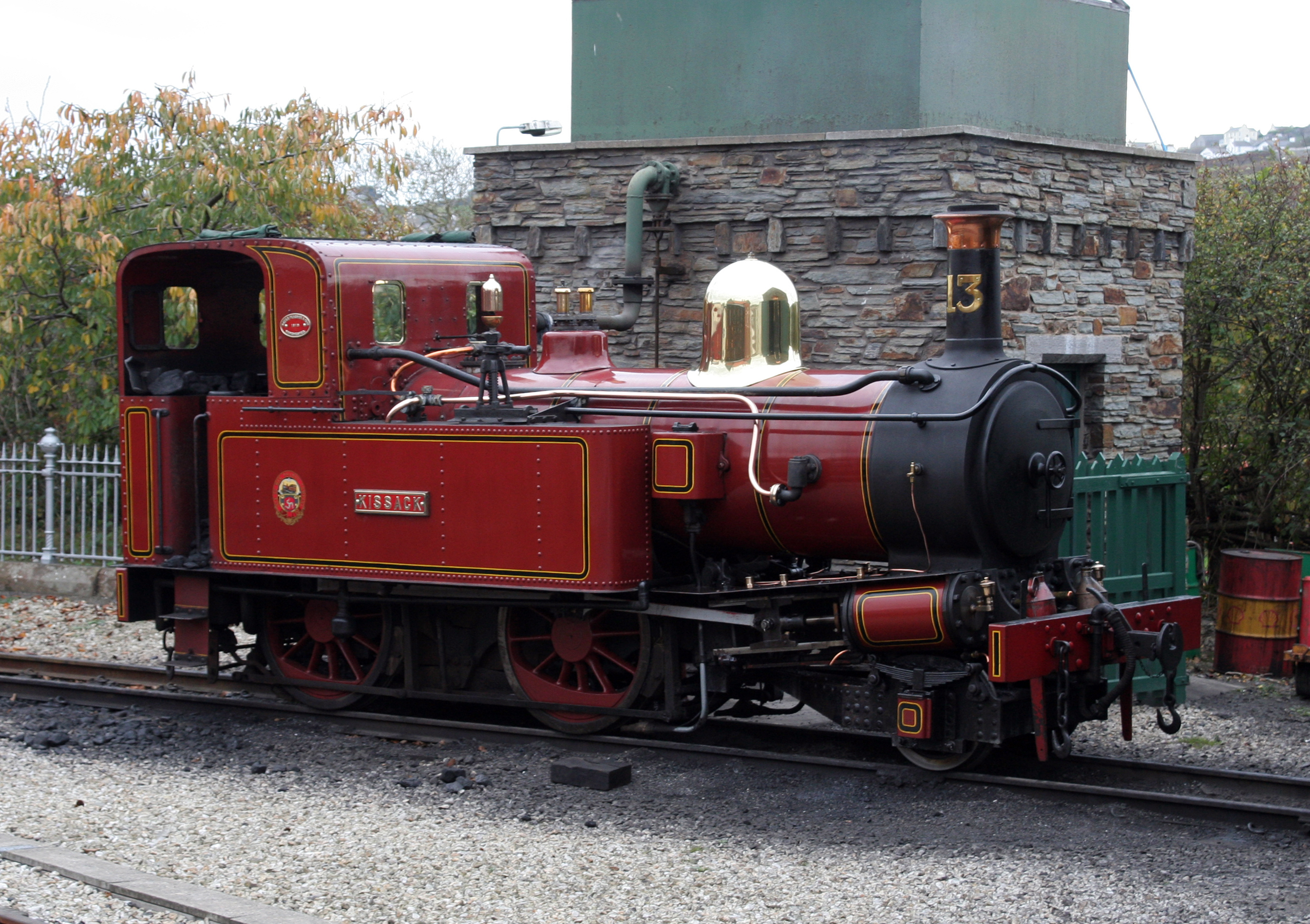
No.13 Kissack outside the locomotive shed with the replacement water tower to the rear in 2007 in the post-war red livery

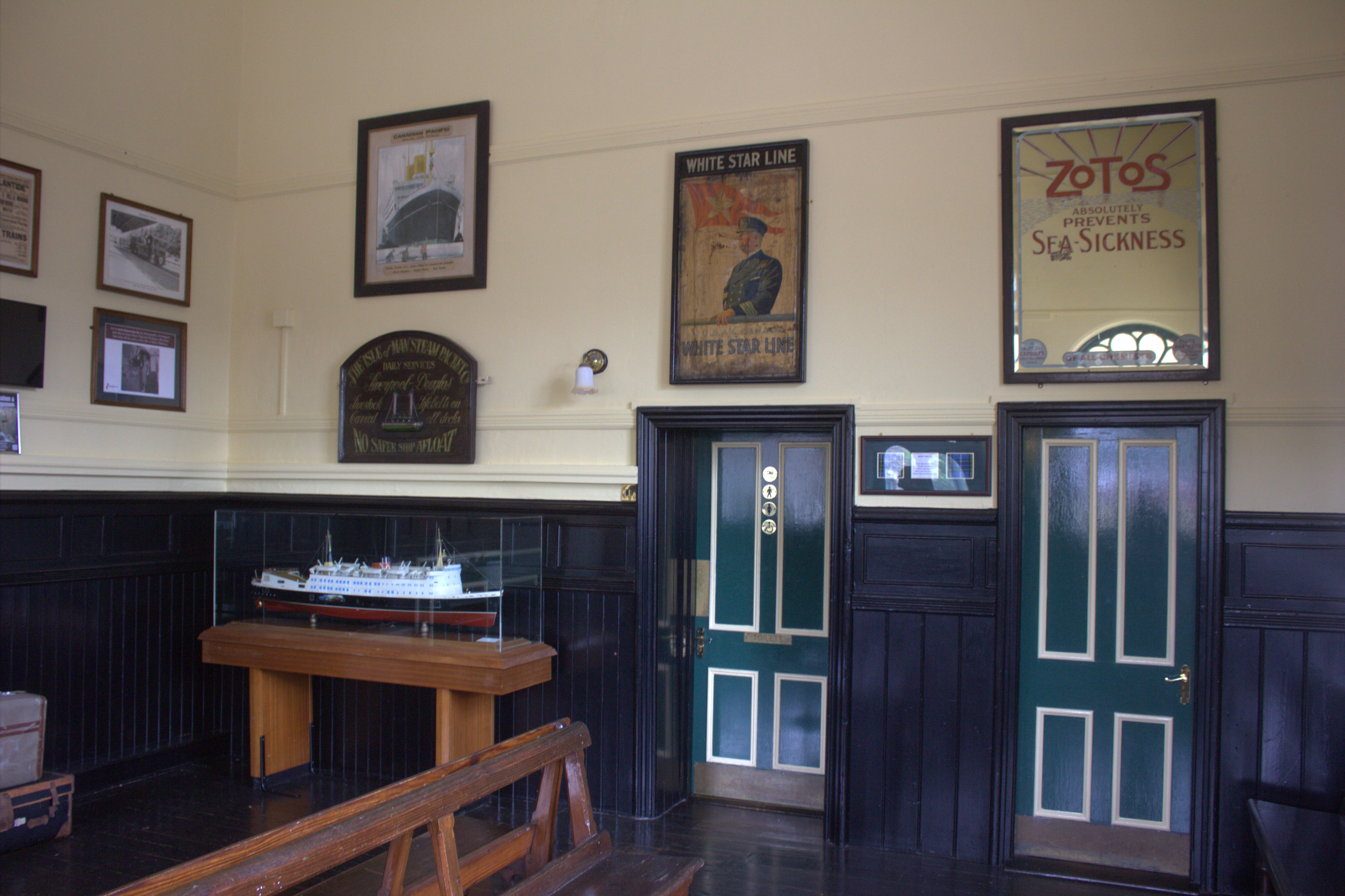
The interior of the waiting room following "regeneration" works with its model of the M.V. Mona's Queen a long-time feature

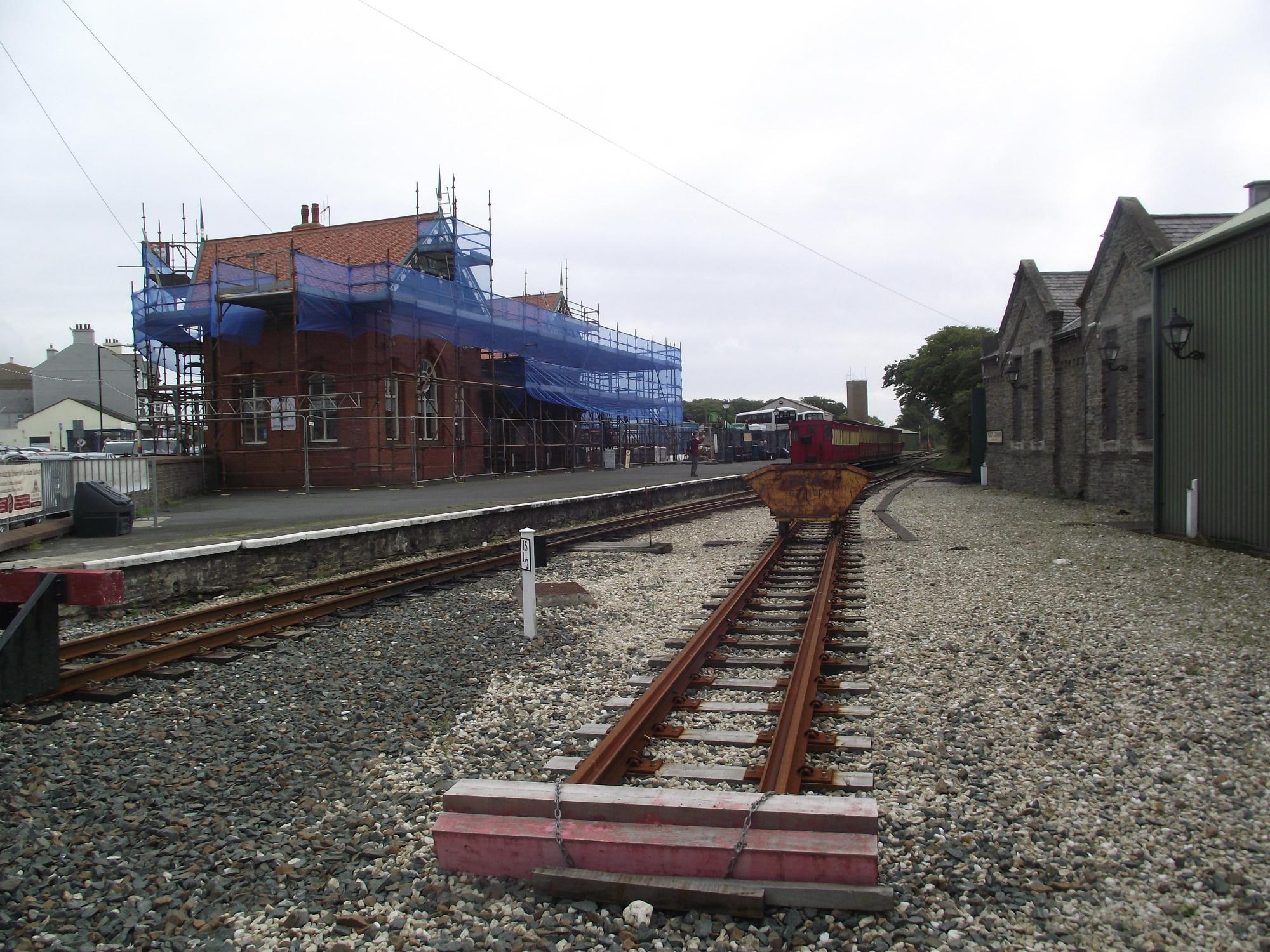
The station viewed from the buffer stops shrouded in scaffolding during "regeneration" works including re-roofing and demolition of later extensions

The main station building is constructed of Ruabon brick and was constructed in 1909 in the centre of the village, replacing a similar original version that was slightly smaller and made of local stone. This building is something of a focal point in the village and houses a booking office, a waiting room which was once a ladies only facility and a café in the former porters' office. This building was extended in the mid 20th century: the extension is now the mess room for locomotive crews, though it was built as a ticket office for Isle of Man Road Services, a subsidiary of the railway company. This extension, which also provides part of the station toilets, has in the past been home to the local Royal National Lifeboat Institution charity shop among others. It is proposed to remove the former bus office, install a new entrance to the station toilets from the street side of the building, and install a new canopy along the street side of the building. This will allow bus services to be moved from the present shelter on Bridson Road.

=== Locomotive Shed (1907) ===
There is also a substantial locomotive shed constructed from local stone adjoining an old bus garage which is home to the railway museum, replacing the 1874 version which stood beside it; this shed was constructed at the turn of the century and houses an inspection pit and one set of rails with access at both ends. Between 1982 and 1998 it served as the goods shed and housed two disused locomotives, No. 8 Fenella and No. 9 Douglas, both of which were privately owned but could be viewed from the exhibition hall of the main museum. Throughout this time the goods shed was used for servicing and housing of service locomotives.

=== Goods Shed (1908) ===
The goods shed was constructed at the turn of century in a similar style to the locomotive shed and also featured one road with doors at either end. Between 1982 and 1998 it was used as the locomotive shed, being fitted with an internal water tank and inspection pit for that reason. At this time is also lost its stone walling at the station end which was spar-dashed.

When the railway museum received a major overhaul beginning in 1998 the shed was converted into the entrance hall and souvenir shop for the museum, regaining a stone gable with the addition of an entrance porch in a similar sympathetic style.

=== Restoration (1990-1991) ===
Following extensive refurbishment, the station won an Ian Allan Heritage Railway award in 1990, but since then only remedial work has been carried out to the station's intricate and distinctively carved wooden fascia boards and other paintwork. In 1999 the traditional "picket" style wooden fencing was removed from the platform area and replaced with tall metal security fencing (to protect the bus yard in the former platform area) which detracted from the picturesque setting.

=== Crossing Hut (1998-2010) ===
A small timber-built sentry box also guarded the entrance to the station where it crosses the public highway at Droghadfayle Road and today this is used only for storage by the gatekeeper until the crossing was automated in the winter of 2012–2013. This structure replaced a much older version in 1998, which had previously seen use as an overspill ticket office at Douglas station prior to that point.

=== Bus Depôt (1975) ===
A large spar-dashed building in the middle of the site is the southern bus depôt of Bus Vannin, erected in 1975 when the entire site was redeveloped, buses having previously been housed in what is now the railway museum. This structure was erected at the same time as the bay platform and sidings were lifted to create further bus storage.

=== Carriage Shed (1998) ===
The station has a two-road carriage shed, also constructed in 1999, ensuring for the first time in the line's history that coaching stock stored overnight could be kept under cover; until this time the carriages were stored outdoors overnight on the platform, and latterly remained there in closed season attracting vandals.

=== Water Tower (1998) ===
The stone-built water tower which serves the locomotive shed today was built in 1998 replacing a much older version which had been removed in 1986 and not replaced at the time. The tower is in a similar style to the original, being of local stone, and houses the station's oil store beneath the tank. It stands on the same site as the original but it slightly larger; a timber-built crew bothy stands behind it, this having been used as a temporary ticket office at Douglas station for the duration of the 2016 season while refurbishment was ongoing.

=== "Regeneration" (2016-2018) ===
Beginning in 2016 the station and its surroundings became part of South West Regeneration Scheme for the village; this has involved the repaving of the adjacent Station Road, removal of the perimeter walling (itself only installed in 1974 when the road was widened), and the removal of a canopy from the northwest gable of the building, this not being original. A replacement canopy in a similar style to that on the platform side of the building was installed and the former bus office (later Quilter's Haltsewing shop) demolished to create a larger paving area, the new canopy continuing round to the roadside of the building. An original feature, the miasma tower, long since removed, was reinstated atop the roof and track realigned onto a curve at the headshunt. A second phase was completed in early 2018 and has seen a sloped area leading to the adjacent railway museum created, effectively making a large new feature wall a central feature when viewed from the road. Foundations were also laid with the possibility of a short platform being added in the future beside the museum and locomotive; to date there are no plans to install this feature.

== Isle of Man Railway Museum ==
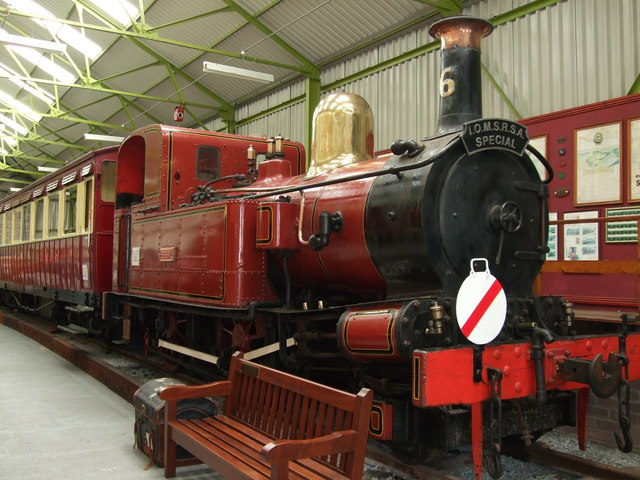
No.6 Peveril (1875) in the main exhibition hall of the museum in a space now occupied by No.5 Mona

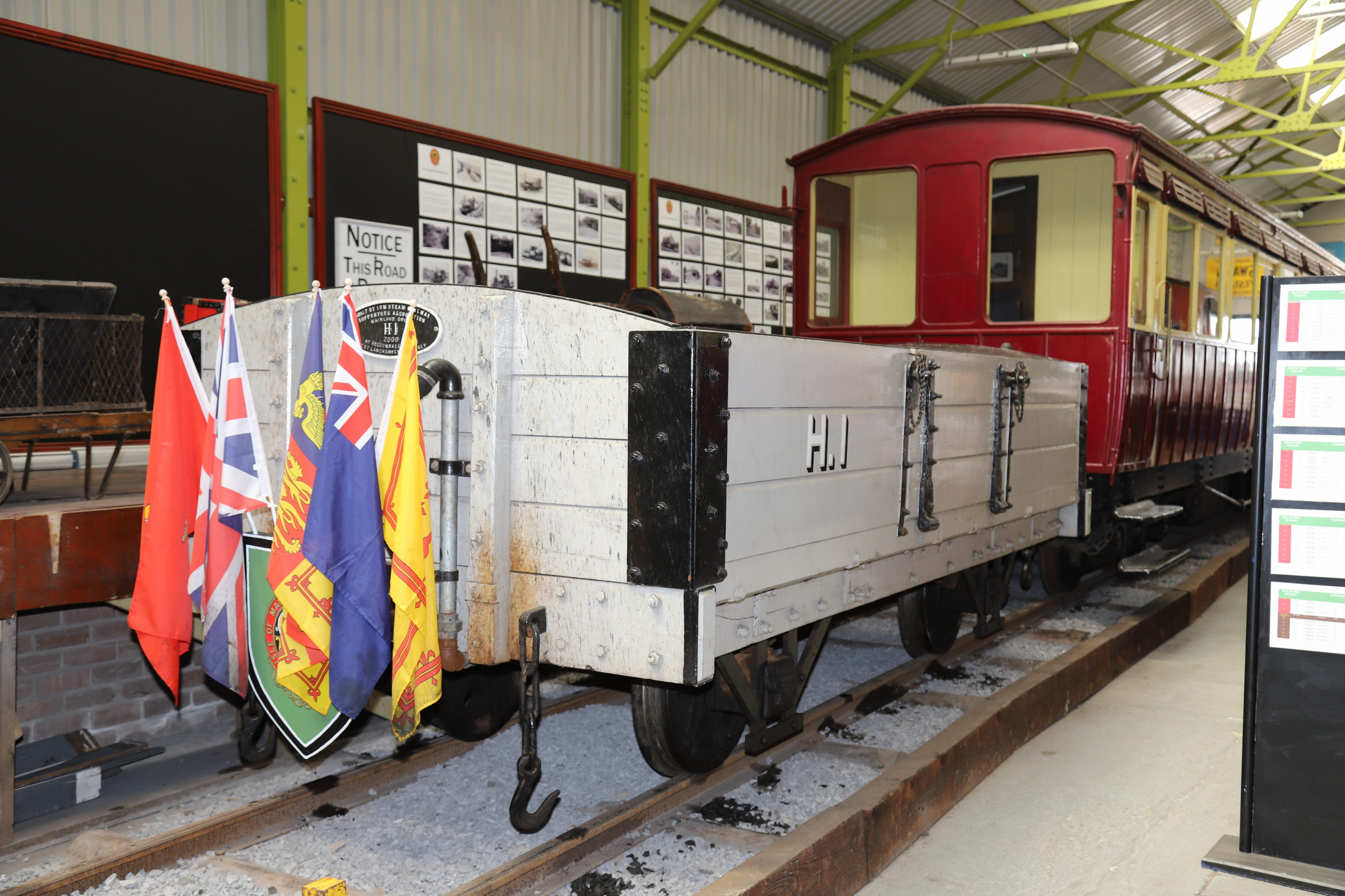
Wagon H.1 and Royal Saloon F.36 on display in the main exhibition hall with obligatory flags, shields and headboards

=== Background ===
Housed in a former bus garage, the museum was opened in 1975 and has a number of exhibits charting the whole history of the railway; before it opened, the goods shed (which today houses the associated souvenir shop and entrance hall) had acted as locomotive shed for several years, whilst two out-of-service locomotives (Nos. 8 Fenella and 9 Douglas were stored in the original locomotive shed. The museum was originally accessed via a purpose-built porch on the adjoining Station Road, but this changed when the whole site was refurbished in 1999. Today the museum houses the railway's last locomotive, No. 16 Mannin supplied in 1926 as well as No. 6 Peveril of 1875 and two carriages as well as a number of framed displays including tickets, memorabilia and historical documentation. Rail access to the building is via the locomotive shed to the rear. The building was built to house the buses of Isle of Man Road Services, a subsidiary of the railway company. When the museum opened an alternative bus garage was built on the site of the former bay platforms.

=== Major Exhibits ===
In the past the line's original locomotive No.1 Sutherland has been housed here together with Manx Northern Railway locomotive No.4 M.N.Ry. No.4 Caledonia and an unusual six-wheeled carriage dating from 1879, which is privately owned and currently in storage elsewhere. An original four-wheeled freight van, Gr.12, was also housed here until 1998 and this has since been restored and sees limited use in annual transport festivals. Volunteers act as guides around the museum in the summer months and there is a temporary display area which houses archive photographs and historical ephemera themed around the annual events which commemorate various anniversaries: 2017 saw the 50th anniversary of the reopening of the railway and 2018 hosted a display for the 40th anniversary of the nationalisation of the line as well as fifty years since closure of the entire network. 2023 saw No.5 Mona entering as part of the one hundred and fiftieth anniversary commemorations.

== Features ==
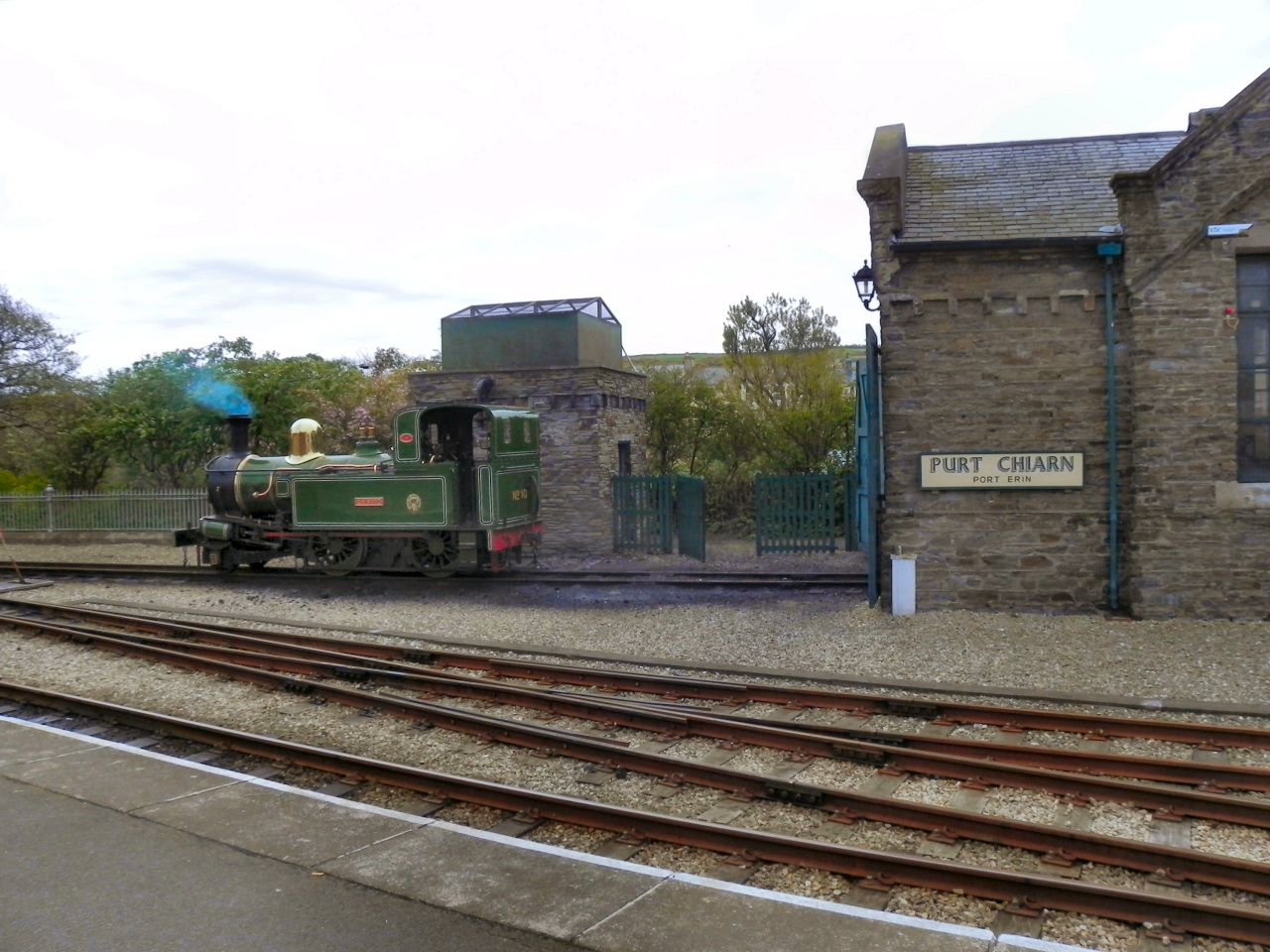
No.10 G.H. Wood on shed in April 2011 beside the running in board

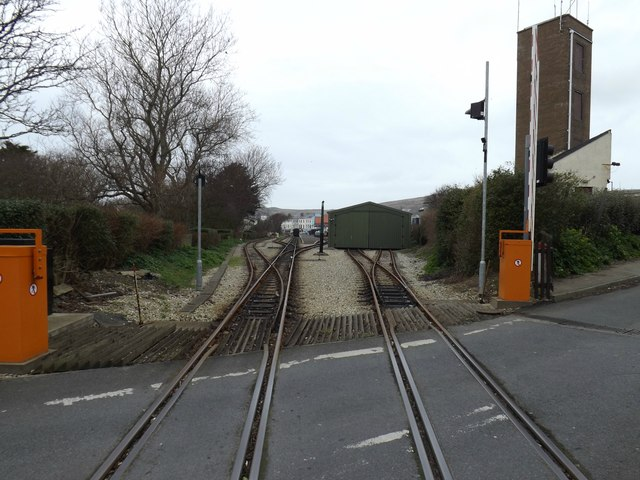
Droghadfayle Road crossing looking towards the station

=== Running-In Boards ===
The station has historically carried a bilingual station nameboard reading "Purt Çhiarn/Port Erin" attached to the side of the locomotive shed, the only station on the network to have had Manx language signs historically; however, in 2008 following new policy, the other running in boards along the line were updated to be bilingual but these are painted maroon and cream rather than the traditional green/cream used at the terminus.

This contrasts with the green and cream livery applied to the station area, but is consistent with the rest of the line. There are plans to change the station colour scheme to maroon as part of a corporate makeover of the whole railway, and repaints carried out subsequently have reverted to the familiar scheme with the colours however inverted in a further break with tradition.

=== Crossings ===
The station is unique in having a public right of way bisecting the long platform and, in bygone days, longer trains (sometimes seen today when the dining train is strengthened with additional carriages) would have to uncouple whilst loading prior to departure to ensure the right of way to the nearby Athol Park was not blocked. This unusual trait has appeared in editions of Ripley's Believe It or Not! titled Right Of Way Thro [sic] A Train!.

At the eastern end of the station is a level crossing (one of the last remaining manual ones on the railway, automated in 2011) across Droghadfayle Road. Until the yard trackwork was re-laid in 1999-2000 the locomotive crew had to open and close the gates whilst "running round" to couple onto the train for departure, but this can now be done without disturbing traffic as the pointwork has been modified to accommodate this.

== Route ==
Preceding station	Isle of Man Railway	Following station
Terminus	Port Erin Line	Port St. Mary
