= Isle of Man Railway =

Steam-operated railway in the Isle of Man

Overview
- Status: 1 line open; 3 lines closed
- Owner: Isle of Man Government; Department of Infrastructure
- Locale: Isle of Man
- Termini: Douglas; Port Erin; Ramsey; Peel; Foxdale
- Website: rail.im

Service
- Type: Nationalised railway

History
- Opened: 1870 (trading 1873)
- Key people: List: George Henry Wood (Secretary & Manager 1876–1911); Thomas Stowell (Secretary & Manager 1912–1924); Alan Sheard (General Manager 1925–1965); Archibald Kennedy (Railway Operator 1967–1972); Max Crookall (General Manager 1969–1974); William Lambden (General Manager 1971–1974); Harry Stewart (General Manager 1964–1978); William Jackson (Chief Executive 1978–1987); Robert Smith (Director 1987–1999); David Howard (Director 1999–2004); Ian Longworth (Director 2009–2022)

Technical
- Track gauge: 3 ft (914 mm)
Route map
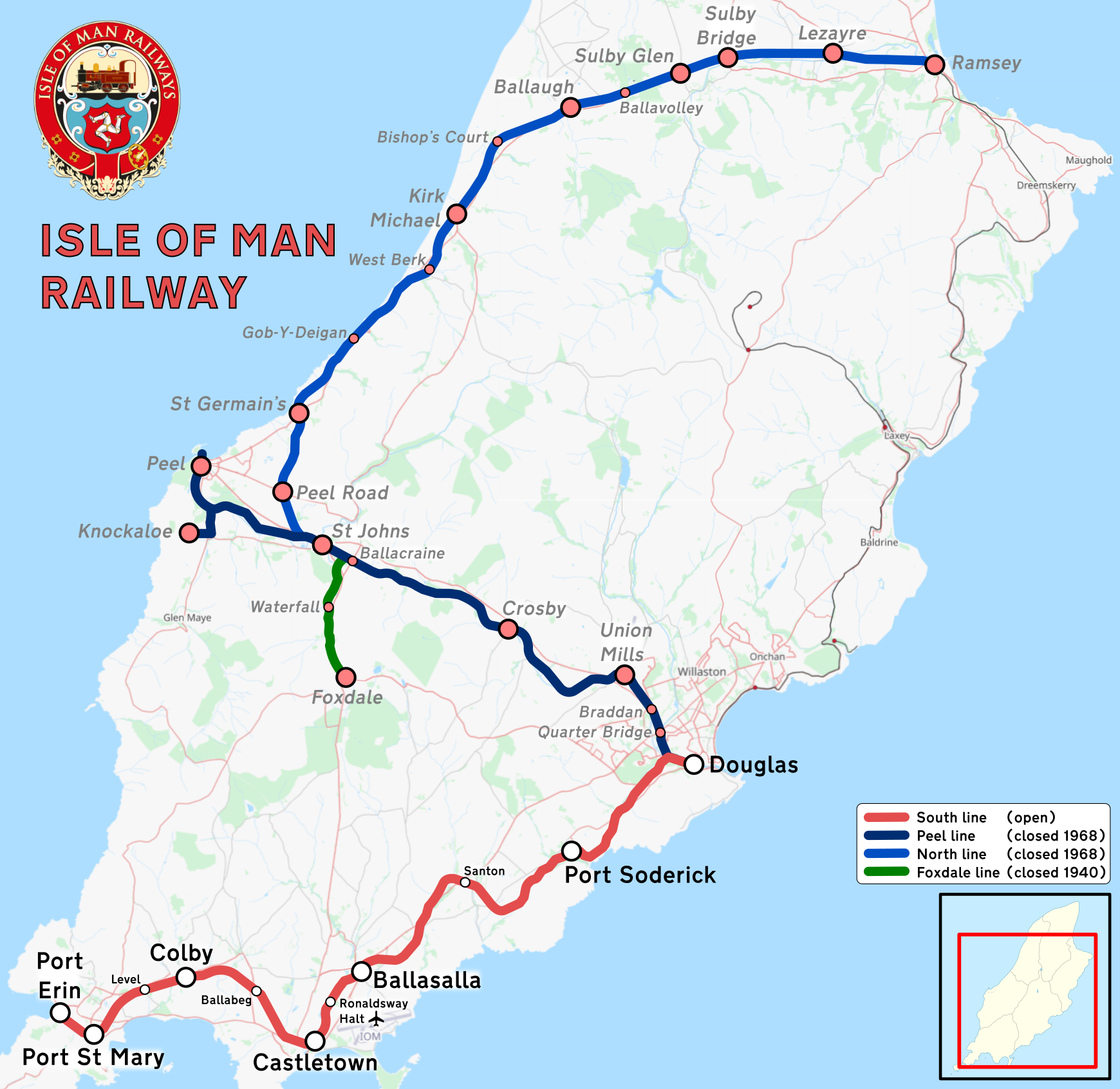
(Click to expand)

The Isle of Man Railway (IMR) is a narrow gauge steam-operated railway connecting Douglas with Castletown and Port Erin in the Isle of Man. The line is 3 ft (914 mm) narrow gauge and 15 1/2 miles (25 kilometres) long. It is the remainder of what was a much larger network (over 46 miles or 74 kilometres) that also served the western town of Peel, the northern town of Ramsey and the mining village of Foxdale. Now in government ownership, it uses original rolling stock and locomotives and there are few concessions to modernity.

== History ==
The 15 1/2-mile (25-kilometre) line from Douglas to Port Erin is the last remaining line of the former Isle of Man Railway Company, formed in 1870. Its first line, from Douglas to Peel, opened on 1 July 1873, followed by the Port Erin line on 1 August 1874. Initially the Port Erin line had been planned to terminate at Castletown, but the construction of deep water docks at Port Erin caused an extension to the line. A few years after completion, the dock was destroyed by heavy seas and the idea of deep water vessels abandoned there. The remains of the breakwater are still visible at low tide.

A third line was built in 1878–1879 by the Manx Northern Railway, from St John's (on the Douglas to Peel line) to Ramsey. A further short line was constructed from St John's to Foxdale in 1885 to serve the lead mines there. Although it was built by the nominally independent Foxdale Railway, it was leased to and operated by the Manx Northern. The loss of the mineral traffic from Foxdale and competition for the Douglas-Ramsey passenger traffic from the Manx Electric Railway placed the Manx Northern Railway in financial difficulties. It was taken over by the IMR in 1904.

During the mid-1920s the IMR formed a bus subsidiary that operated most of the Island's bus services, and helped the railway to remain profitable into the 1960s. The first serious examination of the long term viability of the railway came with the Howden Report in 1949, which recommended the closure of the Ramsey line, which was already losing money; the eventual closure of the Peel line, which was breaking even in the late 1940s; and the retention of the then profitable Port Erin line. Howden also reported that the existing equipment of the railway had an economic life of 10–25 years. Economies were made throughout the 1950s and early 1960s. These included the ending of evening and Sunday services, the deferral of track maintenance, and cuts to train mileage as locomotives became unserviceable. To further reduce expenses, there were winter closures of the Peel line (1960–61 only) and the Ramsey line after September 1961, but A. M. Sheard, the then general manager, refused to close the Ramsey line which by this time was losing a considerable amount of money each year.

Following the closure of the County Donegal Railways in 1960, the IMR purchased the CDR's two most modern diesel railcars, which were then largely used on the Peel line in summer, and after 1962 worked the whole of the winter service except when withdrawn for maintenance. The system closed after the 1965 season but was briefly revived when the Marquess of Ailsa obtained a lease and reopened all three routes in 1967. Both the Peel and Ramsey lines shut following the 1968 season, but goods services between Peel and Milntown (just short of Ramsey) continued until mid-1969. Traffic was poor on the two northern lines, especially that to Ramsey, so after the end of the 1968 season, Ailsa decided to concentrate on passenger service on the South Line for three more seasons until he took the option to end his lease at the close of the 1971 season.

There were occasional empty coaching stock workings between Douglas and St John's in 1970 and 1971 for the retrieval of stored stock between seasons. During this time most of the early wooden framed carriages were moved to St John's, where they were lost in a fire in July 1975. The Peel and Ramsey routes and the Foxdale line were lifted in 1975. The IMR operated services between Douglas and Port Erin after Lord Ailsa took his five-year option, beginning in 1972 through the centenaries of the Peel and Port Erin lines in 1973 and 1974 respectively. In 1975, the Port Erin line operated only from its southwestern terminus to Castletown, but it was found that half a railway made twice the loss. The government sponsored a short extension of the service from Castletown to Ballasalla in 1976, and, after extensive campaigning during the 1976 Tynwald elections, the railway returned to Douglas in 1977, the last year in which the railway was operated by the IMR. Following nationalisation the railway has continued to be operated seasonally, for many years from Easter weekend until the end of September, more recently from around 1 March to early November.

== Ownership ==
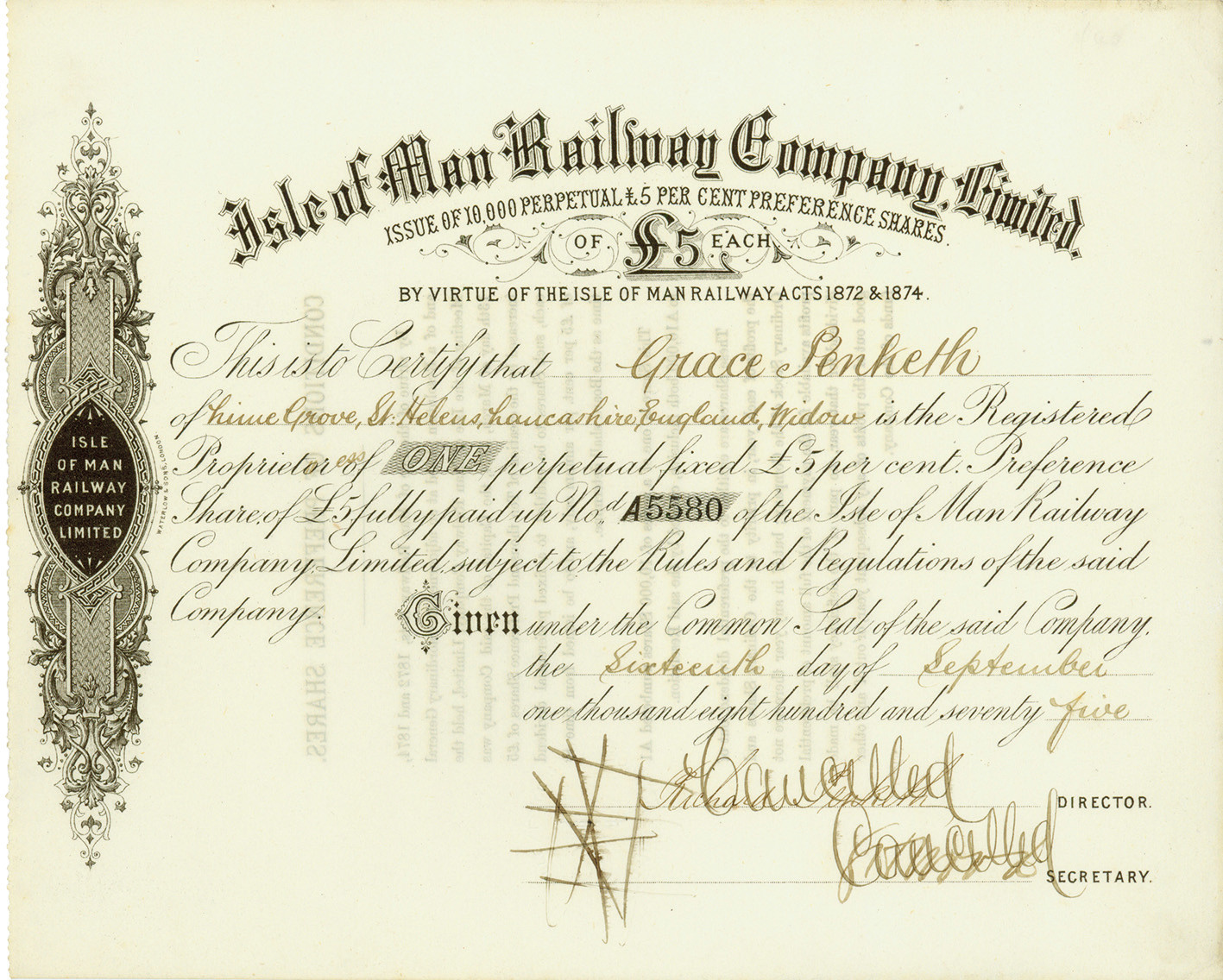
Share certificate of the Isle of Man Railway Company Ltd, issued 16 September 1875

Formed in 1870 with the first line following three years later, the Isle of Man Railway Company operated services until 1977 (see below) merging with the Manx Northern Railway and Foxdale Railway in 1905. The railway is now marketed as the Steam Railway to differentiate it from the Manx Electric Railway, operated by the same department. It was marketed as "Isle of Man Railway" until closure in 1965. From 1969 to 1972, it operated as the Isle of Mann Victorian Steam Railway Company Limited, reverting to Isle of Man Railway. When nationalised in 1978 it fell under the banner of "Isle of Man Railways", along with the Manx Electric Railway. Re-branding to Isle of Man Passenger Transport took place from 1984 but the steam line was not affected, and this reverted to Isle of Man Railways from 1990, when a re-branding exercise took place with the emphasis on the Victorian origins of the railway. A change in management style occurred in 1999, and trains, trams and buses were presented as Isle of Man Transport. The electric railway was affected more by this change, with a series of non-historical and modern liveries, but in 2007 this was changed and the railway is marketed once more as the Isle of Man Railway. In keeping with the historical aspect, coaches and locomotives carry original names and transfers. The banner heading of all the railways was again changed in 2009 and became collectively known as Isle of Man Heritage Railways, although the "heritage" tag has been dropped latterly. Joint timetabling with the Manx Electric Railway sees the line titled as the Steam Railway in marketing material.

== Locations and maps ==
=== South line ===
Point	Coordinates (Links to map resources)	OS Grid Ref	Notes
Douglas	54.1478°N 4.4861°W	SC37727529	
Port Soderick	54.1265°N 4.5384°W	SC34227305	
Santon	54.1182°N 4.5841°W	SC31207223	
Ballasalla	54.0961°N 4.6288°W	SC28196988	
Ronaldsway	54.0881°N 4.6425°W	SC27266902	
Castletown	54.0787°N 4.6488°W	SC26816799	
Ballabeg	54.0911°N 4.6739°W	SC25226943	
Colby	54.0944°N 4.7042°W	SC23256988	
The Level	54.0914°N 4.7211°W	SC22136959	
Port St Mary	54.081°N 4.743°W	SC20666848	
Port Erin	54.085°N 4.758°W	SC19696897	

=== Peel line ===
Point	Coordinates (Links to map resources)	OS Grid Ref	Notes
Peel	54.2219°N 4.6974°W	SC24248404	
Knockaloe railway station and branch line	54.2055°N 4.7038°W	SC23758223	
Knockaloe Internment Camp	54.2054°N 4.7046°W	SC23708222	
St John's	54.2012°N 4.6415°W	SC27798160	
Ballacraine	54.1986°N 4.6325°W	SC28378129	
Crosby	54.182°N 4.566°W	SC32647928	
Union Mills	54.169°N 4.52°W	SC35597773	
Braddan Bridge § Railway halt	54.1615°N 4.5056°W	SC36507686	
Quarterbridge Crossing	54.1558°N 4.5017°W	SC36737622	
Douglas	54.1478°N 4.4861°W	SC37727529	

=== North line ===
Point	Coordinates (Links to map resources)	OS Grid Ref	Notes
Ramsey station	54.322°N 4.387°W	SC44859445	
Lezayre	54.325°N 4.429°W	SC42139487	
Sulby Bridge	54.324°N 4.472°W	SC39339486	
Sulby Glen	54.319°N 4.491°W	SC38079435	
Ballavolley Halt	54.315°N 4.517°W	SC36369396	
Ballaugh	54.31°N 4.541°W	SC34789346	
Bishop's Court	54.3036°N 4.5703°W	SC32859282	
Kirk Michael	54.284°N 4.587°W	SC31699068	
West Berk	54.2713°N 4.5998°W	SC30808930	
Gob-y-Deigan	54.253°N 4.633°W	SC28568734	
St. Germain's	54.236°N 4.654°W	SC27128550	
Peel Road	54.215°N 4.66°W	SC26658318	
St John's	54.2012°N 4.6415°W	SC27798160	

=== Foxdale line ===
Point	Coordinates (Links to map resources)	OS Grid Ref	Notes
St John's	54.2012°N 4.6415°W	SC27798160	
Waterfall	54.18°N 4.642°W	SC27677924	
Foxdale	54.17°N 4.636°W	SC28027812	

=== Knockaloe branch ===
In addition to the main routes there was also a short-lived branch line/spur off the Peel Line between the terminus and St. John's, serving an alien internment camp of the same name; this operated between 1915 and 1920. The line was on the outskirts of Peel near Glenfaba Mill, and climbed steeply in a southerly direction for about 0.7 miles (1.1 km) until it reached the village of Patrick. It then turned west along the access road into the internment camp, which had been built in the grounds of Knockaloe Farm. The total length of the branch line was about 1.2 miles (1.9 km).

== South line described ==
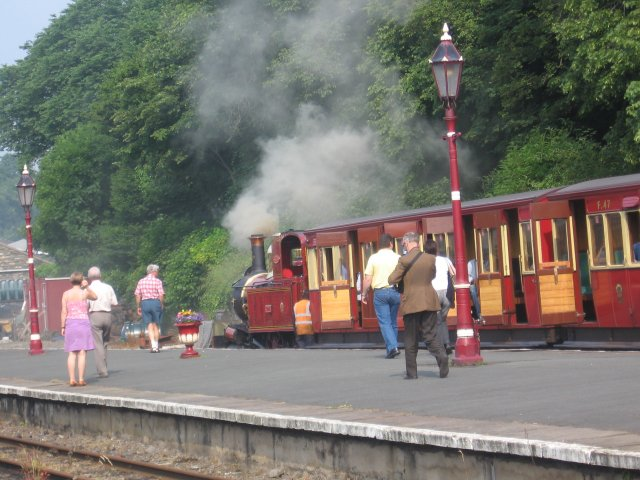
Douglas Station, 2008

Today's railway is a fraction of its original size: it once served the western town of Peel, the northern town of Ramsey and the small mining village of Foxdale. Since 1969 only the southern line has been operational. Although it is only about half of its former size, Douglas Station is still an impressive complex. After crossing the River Douglas, the line climbs the 2.5-mile (4.0 km)-long 1-in-65 Nunnery Bank through a wide rock cutting that brings it through a large estate, and past an industrial estate to the White Hoe, where the Island's largest brewery is passed on the left of the train before crossing the first bridge.

The train continues to climb to Port Soderick, just before which passengers get the first view of the sea at Keristal, before descending into the railway station. The train then passes through Crogga Woods, under another bridge at Meary Veg (centre for the Island's sewage treatment works) and climbs, reaching its summit (209 feet or 63.7 metres, marked by a board visible from the train) close to the site of Ballacostain Halt. The train descends to Santon, the only intermediate station in substantially original condition. From here the train descends at 1 in 60 to Ballasalla railway station, with interesting sea-cliff views to the east. Regular service trains formerly passed each other here. After Ballasalla the line runs over relatively flat land past the request halt at Ronaldsway to the ancient capital of Castletown.

After Castletown the railway crosses the Silver Burn and heads northwest across country to the diminutive request stop at Ballabeg Station. It then turns west for the short run to Colby, which is popular with the locals. After a request stop at the Level the train continues to Port St Mary, with views of Bradda Head and Milner's Tower on this stretch of line to Port Erin. Port Erin railway station is home to the Whistle Stop Coffee Shop, providing light refreshments, and the Isle of Man Railway Museum, established in 1975 with two locomotives and rolling stock including the Governor's Saloon from the opening of the line in 1873.

The majority of the line runs through countryside, with only small stretches close to built-up areas. Many people start or end their journey in Port Erin, a Victorian seaside resort, or in Castletown, the ancient capital. Ronaldsway Halt, between Ballasalla and Castletown, is a few hundred yards' walk from the airport. There are several farm crossings and rural request stops, which largely serve adjoining fields and local communities, especially on the southernmost section which passes through agricultural land. The line passes along the southern plain after traversing the more hilly landscape north of Ballasalla.

== Post-nationalisation ==
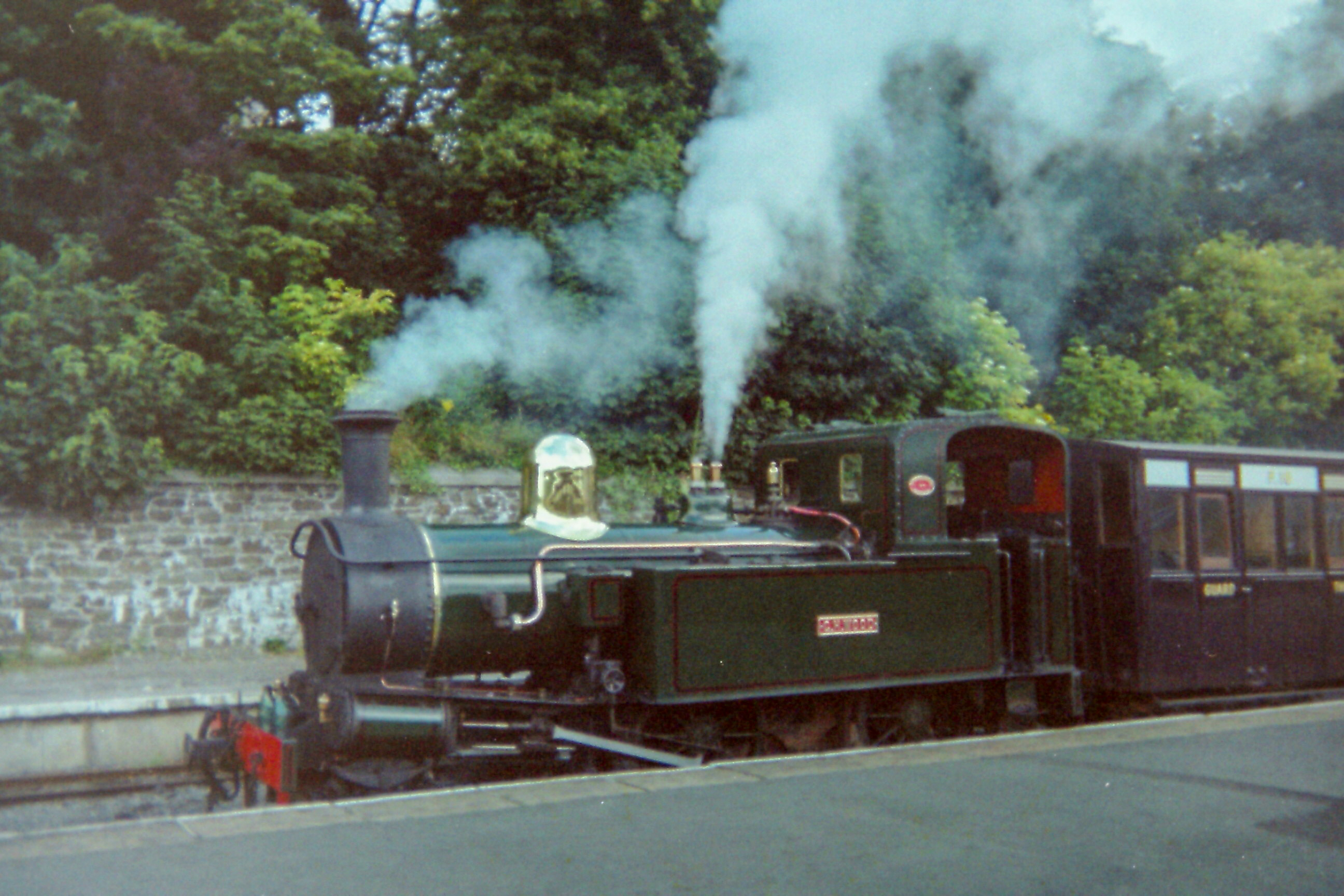
Restored the previous year for the Year Of Railways celebrations, locomotive No.10 G.H.Wood ready to depart Douglas Station 1994

When the railway was nationalised in 1978 Bill Jackson was appointed the first manager. During his time in office much progress was made, not all liked by the preservationists and supporters: negative developments overshadowing his tenure included the loss of the large railway yard at Douglas and the unpopular rebuild of No. 12 locomotive, Hutchinson. Upon his retirement in 1987 he was replaced by Robert Smith, whose style was totally different and who made many changes. Smith masterminded the Year of Railways in 1993 and the celebrations that followed. Rolling stock returned to original "purple lake" livery and Nos. 10, 15 and 1 (in that order) were returned to service. When he resigned in 1999 he was replaced by David Howard, with previous bus experience at various UK operators and rail experience from his time at Tyne and Wear Metro. He was more inclined to a corporate approach, and the railway had to follow suit. His time in office, finishing in 2006, will be remembered for the thrust on health and safety issues, such as high-visibility clothing and warning signs, as part of a Government-wide drive.

The government commissioned a study to see if it would be worthwhile to operate commuter services to help relieve the road traffic congestion in and around Douglas, and although experimental services were implemented in 2007, these operate only during TT race periods. The study recommended against such development. Nevertheless, almost all the line was relaid in the first few years of this century as part of the Department of Transport's IRIS sewerage scheme, with all but one of the numerous level crossings converted from manual to automatic operation, saving the cost of employing crossing keepers. After Howard resigned, the Department of Tourism and Leisure's Director of Leisure, Mike Ball, stepped in as acting director of public transport, and in early 2007 the leisure and public transport divisions of the department combined into "service delivery", Ball becoming "Director of service delivery" under the minister Adrian Earnshaw appointed in November 2006. Ian Longworth was appointed Director of Public Transport in 2009 and since then the railway been the responsibility of the Department of Community, Culture and Leisure.

A number of new services have been introduced since the arrival of the new director, including evening excursion trains, a Rush Hour event at the start of each season, and family-oriented events including a Teddy Bears' Picnic and Fathers' Day specials. A restoration programme for the unique collection of rolling stock and locomotives remains ongoing; this has seen two saloon-type carriages completely rebuilt and back in traffic as part of the popular dining train with several more carriages to be restored, one of which has been out of traffic for nearly half a century. Locomotive restorations also continue, though the director retired in September 2022 and to date a successor has not been appointed. The 150th anniversary of the closed Peel Line was commemorated in 2023 with an extended Manx Heritage Transport Festival (billed once again as the Year of Railways) echoing the 1993 events, with the similar anniversary of the Port Erin Line similarly celebrated in the summer of 2024 during another week-long event, original locomotives No.4 Loch and No.5 Mona taking a central part in the event with a combined age of three hundred years, though the latter is not operational, having been cosmetically restored by the Isle of Man Steam Railway Supporters' Association for the 2023 event.

== Locomotives ==
=== Steam ===
All but one of the railway's distinctive locomotives were built by Beyer, Peacock & Company of Manchester between 1873 and 1926, with 16 steam locomotives in total. As of October 2023 there are four locomotives in traffic: No.4 Loch, No.11 Maitland, No.13 Kissack and M.N.Ry. No.4 Caledonia. In addition, No.10 G.H. Wood and No.12 Hutchinson as of May 2024 are undergoing rebuilds. The Isle of Man Railway Museum is home to No.1 Sutherland of 1873 and No.6 Peveril of 1875, with other locomotives No.5 Mona at Port St. Mary Station and No.9 Douglas cosmetically restored by the Isle of Man Steam Railway Supporters' Association for display in the museum from 2026. Only No.2 Derby has been lost, with only the frames of No.7 Tynwald in existence, privately owned off-island and No.3 Pender in the Manchester Science Museum.

=== Diesel ===
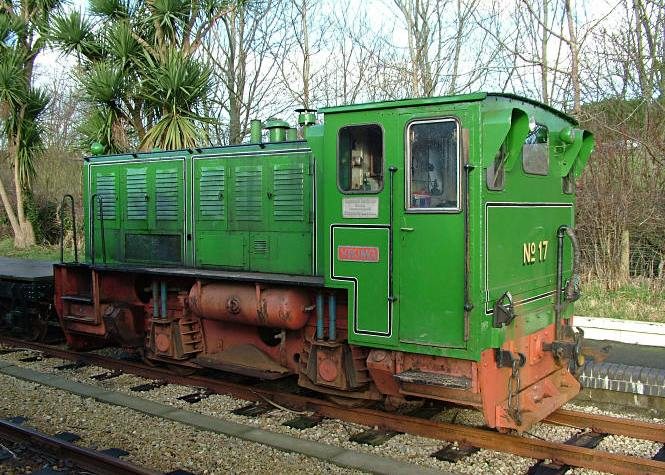
No.17 Viking Santon Station 2011

The railway also possesses three diesel locomotives: No.17 Viking which was withdrawn in 2010, No.18 Ailsa, used as shunting locomotive at Douglas station and the unnamed No. 21, a diesel electric locomotive delivered in December 2013. A number of smaller shunting locomotives and people carriers for departmental use also exist including two Motor-Rail units (No.24 Betsy and No.25 Sprout) based at Port Erin and Douglas stations respectively, and two Wickham people carriers (No.22 and No.23) used on departmental work and fire train duties as well as spells in use on the Manx Electric Railway when required. There are also two diesel railcar units (No.19 & No.20) which are in storage at Douglas station partially restored having last operated in 1995. In 2024 two modern, small diesel locomotives were acquired secondhand from Bord na Móna in Ireland, whose industrial rail system is being closed down due to the end of peat harvesting.

== Carriages ==
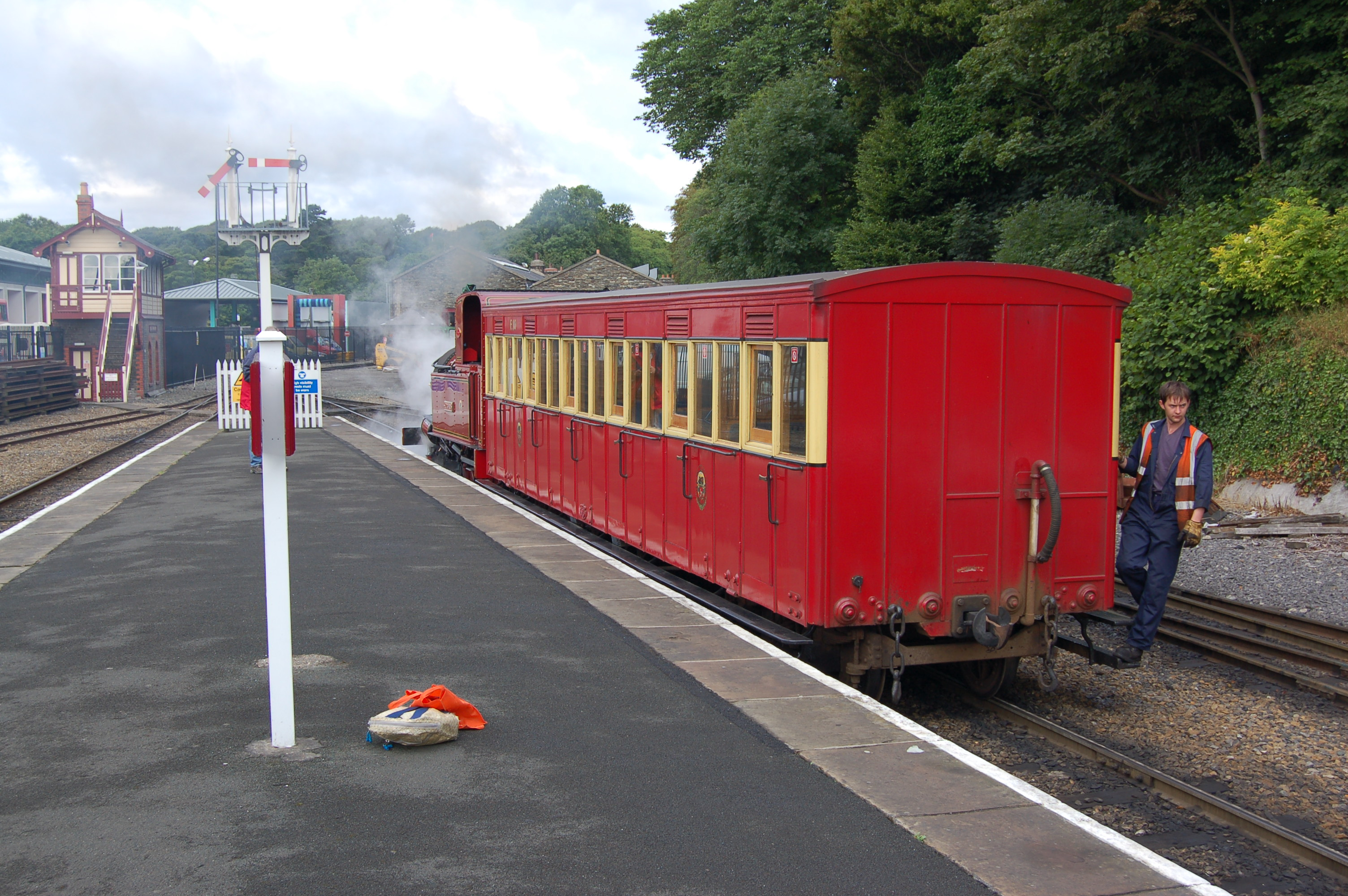
One of the "Small F" carriages (F.10) being shunted at Douglas Station in 2006; these are the earliest carriages and are timber framed.

About 30 carriages remain on the railway, of which 18 are in service, two in the Isle of Man Railway Museum, and the rest in storage. Several vehicles were sold off-island in 1975 for preservation, and at least one has been preserved privately on the Island. Over 12 out-of-use carriages were lost in a fire that engulfed the large carriage shed at St John's in 1975, and more were damaged beyond economic repair, including most of the remaining Manx Northern six-wheelers. There is an ongoing maintenance programme for returning carriages to traffic, which saw two saloons completely rebuilt and returned to traffic in 2011, with a further two in 2012, all of which now form part of the dining train.

In the winter of 2013, a replica of Empress Van F.27 was built on a steel underframe as a kitchen to work with the saloons as a dining train. Significant work was also done on the Cardinal's Saloon F.35, which is used as the bar carriage, and the other saloons have being converted recently to dining cars seating 66 in total, giving the six saloon set as of 2015. Further restored stock include 'pairs' carriages F.62 and F.63 in 2021 and 2022 respectively, timber framed F.11 in 2022 and work also ongoing on sister F.10 which is receiving similar treatment. F.15 also returned to service in the summer of 2022 with the programme of restorations ultimately to aim for three rakes of five or six compartment carriages.

Serviceable carriages at May 2024 are F.9, F.15, F.18, F.26, F.39 (the Foxdale Coach, numbered M.N.Ry. No.17 and restored to 1887 appearance), F.45, F.46, F.47, F.48, F.49, F.54, F.62 and F.63 with both F.10 and F.11 undergoing restoration works. In addition to these the dining train is made up of F.27 (ii) (a replica 1897-built Empress Van) and saloons F.29, F.30, F.31, F.32 and F.35. The remaining surviving carriages are stored in various states of repair, with Ducal Saloon F.75 in the museum with other non-passenger stock. Also on the railway is privately owned six-wheel Manx Northern Railway carriage M.N.Ry. No.6 which occasionally sees use during events. Withdrawn and stored carriages which remain on the Island are F.21, F.25, F.43 – all at Port Erin Station with F.66, F.67 and F.74 at Jurby Airfield. A number of carriages are off-island, notably M.N.Ry. No.3 in Suffolk with M.N.Ry. No.1 amnd M.N.Ry. No.14 in private ownership with F.68 displayed at the Vale of Rheidol Railway since 2024 in restored condition.

== Operation ==
The IMR has always had a marked seasonal pattern in traffic. Services evolved around two main considerations: the need to connect with ferries to and from the UK and Ireland, and to transport day trippers out of the major termini. The railway never evolved appreciable commuter traffic, so local traffic tended to revolve around shopping, attending markets, and trips to "Town".

=== 1873–1879 ===
When the Isle of Man and Manx Northern Railways opened between 1873 and 1879, the basic service on all three main routes consisted of four or five trains a day. The first departures were timed to arrive in Douglas just before 08:30 to connect with the morning ferries to the UK. The trains returned from Douglas shortly after 09:00, crossing the second inbound trains of the day en route. All three routes then had a late morning/lunchtime, and late afternoon trains in both the up and down directions, with the day's service ending with an early evening departure from Douglas. The February 1878 timetable shows departures from Douglas to Peel at 09:00, 11:00, 14:15, 17:15 and 19:40, and to Port Erin at 08:30, 10:10, 14:10, 17:00, and 19:35. From Peel to Douglas trains departed at 07:40, 10:05, 13:00, 16:00, and 18:30, and from Port Erin at 07:20, 09:50, 12:30, 15:40, and 18:20. This rather basic service tended to increase until after World War Two: seven trains each way on the three main routes was the usual winter timetable in the 1920s and 30s. From 1886 to 1940, the Foxdale branch was served by up to four round trips on weekdays from St John's.

Additional trains were added to the basic service at Easter and again at Whitsun. The high season timetable usually came into effect on the first Monday of July, or immediately following Tynwald Day (5 July). This often stretched the railway's resources to the limit. At its height in the 1920s, the railway was carrying well over a million passengers a year. In this timetable there were up to 15 round trips on the Peel and Port Erin lines, and up to 14 on the Ramsey line, with even Foxdale seeing a half dozen trains each day. In 1927, during the "Bus War", the IMR boasted that it ran "100 trains a day at pre-war prices."

=== 1930–1945 ===
In the 1930s, following the integration of train and bus services, the summer train service was trimmed to about a dozen trains each way on all three main routes. This intensive service ran on an entirely single-track system controlled by staff and ticket safeworking, with limited semaphore signalling. As the UK's 1889 Railways Act did not apply on the Island, there were no signal interlockings except at Douglas and St John's, though limited interlocking in the form of slot detectors was fitted at passing loops from 1927 onwards. Continuous vacuum brakes were not fitted until 1925–27. In spite of this the railway has seen very few serious accidents (see below).

During World War II, the usual winter timetable of seven or eight trains each way a day on all three main routes between 07:00 and 20:00 ran throughout. However, as the number of servicemen on the Island increased, additional late trains were run on Fridays and Saturdays: the last arrivals in Port Erin, Peel, and Ramsey were often around midnight. Military requirements led to a large number of special trains being run, some of them in the small hours of the morning, which led to some minor mishaps. Foxdale passenger services ceased in 1940, but the branch was heavily used for spoil trains during the construction of Jurby and Ronaldsway aerodromes.

=== 1945–1959 ===
Traffic levels remained very high in the late 1940s due to petrol rationing, but the 1948 Howden Report foresaw the eventual closure of both the Ramsey and Peel lines, with goods services transferred to road transport. The brief post-war resurgence of the Manx tourist industry kept the trains well filled into the mid-1950s, and postponed the day when significant economies and modernisation would be required. From 1955 onwards usage declined sharply; a million passengers were carried for the last time in 1957. By then the high season schedule had been reduced to seven round trips to Port Erin, and five each on the Peel and Ramsey lines. However individual trains, such as the boat trains, and the 10:35 to Port Erin could load very heavily: 9 carriages and almost 500 passengers on a single train was common in high season.

=== 1960–1965 ===
The last re-boilering before the 1965 closure took place in 1959; by then the active fleet had been reduced to 11 locomotives from the 16 of 1939 by the withdrawal of Nos. 7, 2, 9, 4, and 3. Loco Nos. 1, 6, 13, 14 and 16 were known to have limited lives left on their existing boilers, so the future looked grim. Although the railway was still intensively used in summer, winter train services had been reduced to morning and afternoon round trips to Port Erin and Peel, and a solitary working to Ramsey. These trains operated mainly for parcels traffic, and were run at a considerable loss. Winter trains usually consisted of a locomotive and one or two carriages. The St John's – Peel section closed for the winter of 1960, reopening the following Easter, whilst in 1961–65 the St John's to Ramsey service was withdrawn for the winter months, after the long-established Kirk Michael to Ramsey school trains were replaced by buses. From 1962 the ex-County Donegal railcars handled most of the winter service; they were used between Douglas and Peel in the summer. The last two summer timetables reflect the tourism of the mid-1960s. These show six round trips on the Port Erin line, three to five on the Peel line, and two to Ramsey. Except for the Port Erin-Douglas boat train July and August, all trains operated between 09:30 and 17:30: quite a contrast with the 15 or 16 hours-a-day operation of the 1920s and 1930s. Almost the whole of the Peel line service was handled by the ex-Donegal Railcars, allowing the remaining steam locomotives to be divided between the South Line and the service to Ramsey.

=== 1967–1968 ===
In June 1967 Ailsa issued an ambitious summer timetable that pushed a reduced locomotive fleet to its limit, leaving no contingency in the event of failure, as by now only five Beyer Peacock steam locomotives and the railcars were available for service. The timetable was modified by mid-August to four round trips to Castletown (unchanged), three to Peel (down from 7) and two to Ramsey. This pattern carried over to the 1968 season, except that the Ramsey service was reduced to one train thrice-weekly by the end of the season.

=== Closure of the Peel and Ramsey lines ===
Since the closure of the Peel and Ramsey lines, the basic service has generally been four trains a day between Douglas and Port Erin and return, at roughly two-hour intervals between 10:00 and 16:00. In most seasons an extra train has operated from Douglas around 10:45 during July and August, returning from Port Erin at about 15.30. A brief 1990s experiment of six trains each way in high season was abandoned on grounds of cost. In the 2012, 2013, and 2014 seasons, a six train service has again been run in high season. The service in 2012 followed the conventional pattern of a third locomotive and third set of carriages providing additional departures at 10:50 and 14:50 from Douglas, and 12:50 and 16:50 from Port Erin; but in 2013, a third locomotive was used to shorten turn around times at Douglas, and trains departed at 90-minute intervals through the day. This allowed the use of only two rakes of carriages for the scheduled service, allowing the saloons to be reserved for excursion and charter trains.

In the period 1945–1965 most trains consisted of two and three-carriage sets hauled by a single locomotive. Each three-car set consisted of a brake third or brake-composite, a first-third composite, and a luggage-brake-third, with two car sets omitting the either the brake-composite, or the luggage-brake-third. Three car sets had seats for 120 third class, 12 first class; two car sets carried up to 60 third and 12 first class passengers. Additional carriages – usually older stock such as "the Pairs" and "small Fs" – were added when loadings increased in mid-summer. The official maximum loading for a single locomotive was seven carriages until 1977, when it was reduced to six (SRN Spring 1978). However, during locomotive shortages a single Medium Boiler locomotive sometimes handled eight or nine carriages on Port Erin trains, banked as far as Keristal by the Douglas station pilot. Peel and Ramsey trains were usually combined between Douglas and St John's. These trains were often double-headed, usually to balance locomotive workings rather than on account of loading.

Apart from the Ramsey Cattle Mart specials and the transport of materials for projects such as the completion of an airfield in the north of the Island, freight trains rarely operated. Most freight was conveyed by attaching freight wagons, loose coupled, to the rear of passenger trains. This practice was contrary to UK regulations, but legal in the Isle of Man. The consequent shunting often delayed passenger trains at intermediate stations, but was cost effective for the railway. A miscommunication while detaching a van from a Douglas train at Union Mills was a contributory factor to the 22 August 1925 accident at Douglas.

Freight traffic ceased in the 1960s, as road transport was much more effective over the Island's short distances. Ailsa's manager, Sir Philip Wombwell, did try to bring container traffic to the railway in 1967/8 and stripped 12 carriages from the F50-75 series of the bodies to act as container flats. The experiment proved unsuccessful as clearance issues prevented containers being carried north of Douglas, and the double transshipment of containers at Castletown – from ship to lorry and from lorry to train – made the traffic uneconomic. Some of the underframes from this project eventually found their way to the Ffestiniog Railway, where they were placed on 2-foot (0.61 m) gauge bogies and used as the basis for some of the "Barn" carriages running on the FR. Far more successful was a contract to haul oil between Peel and Milntown (near Ramsey) for the Electricity Board. Three 'M' series wagons were fitted with tanks, and the oil was worked as tail traffic until passenger trains ceased in September. The service continued through the winter of 1968/9, but was abandoned in May 1969 following the decision to close the Peel and Ramsey lines.

== Timetabling ==
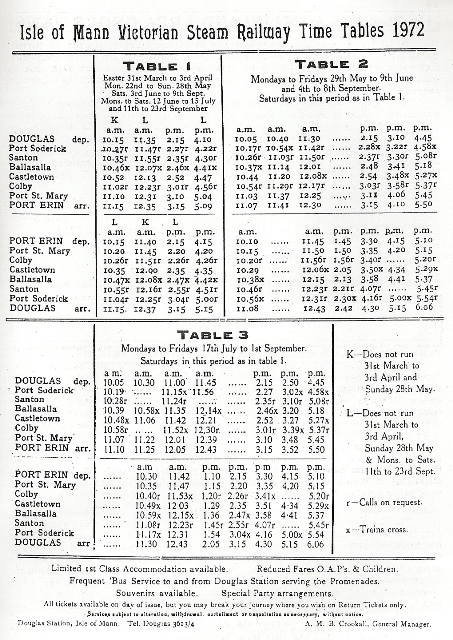
Summer 1972 timetable

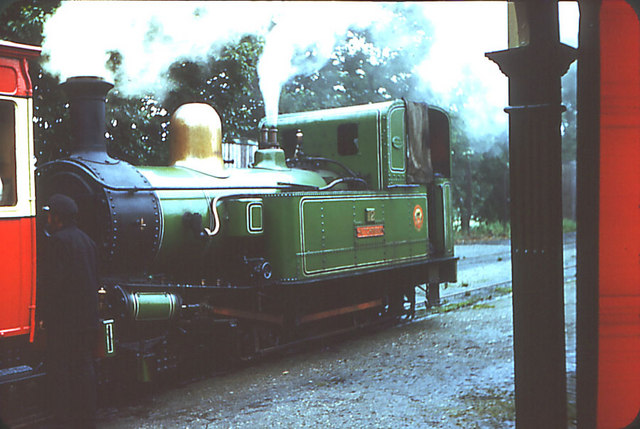
No.12 Hutchinson Castletown Station 1968

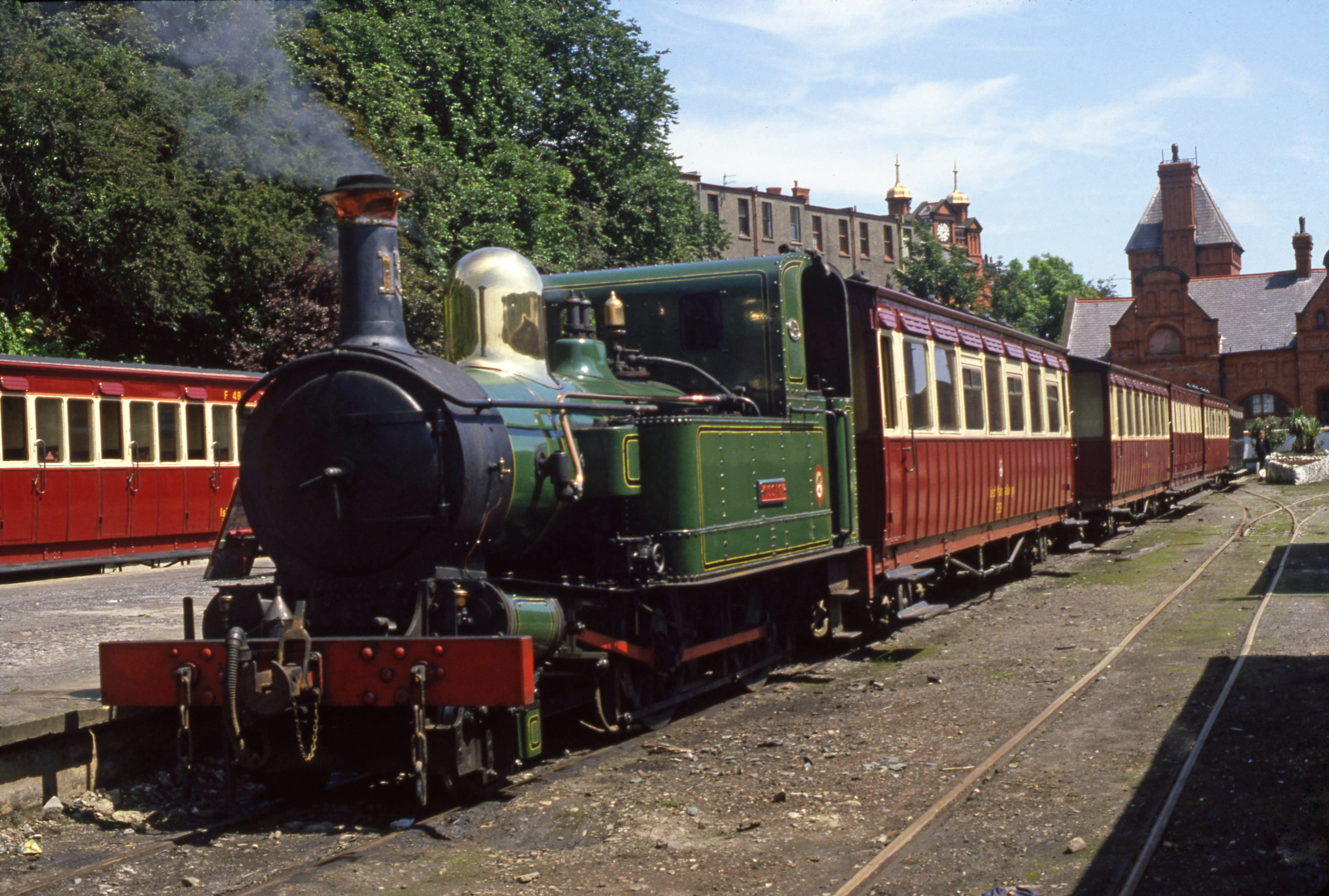
No.13 Kissack Douglas Station 1982

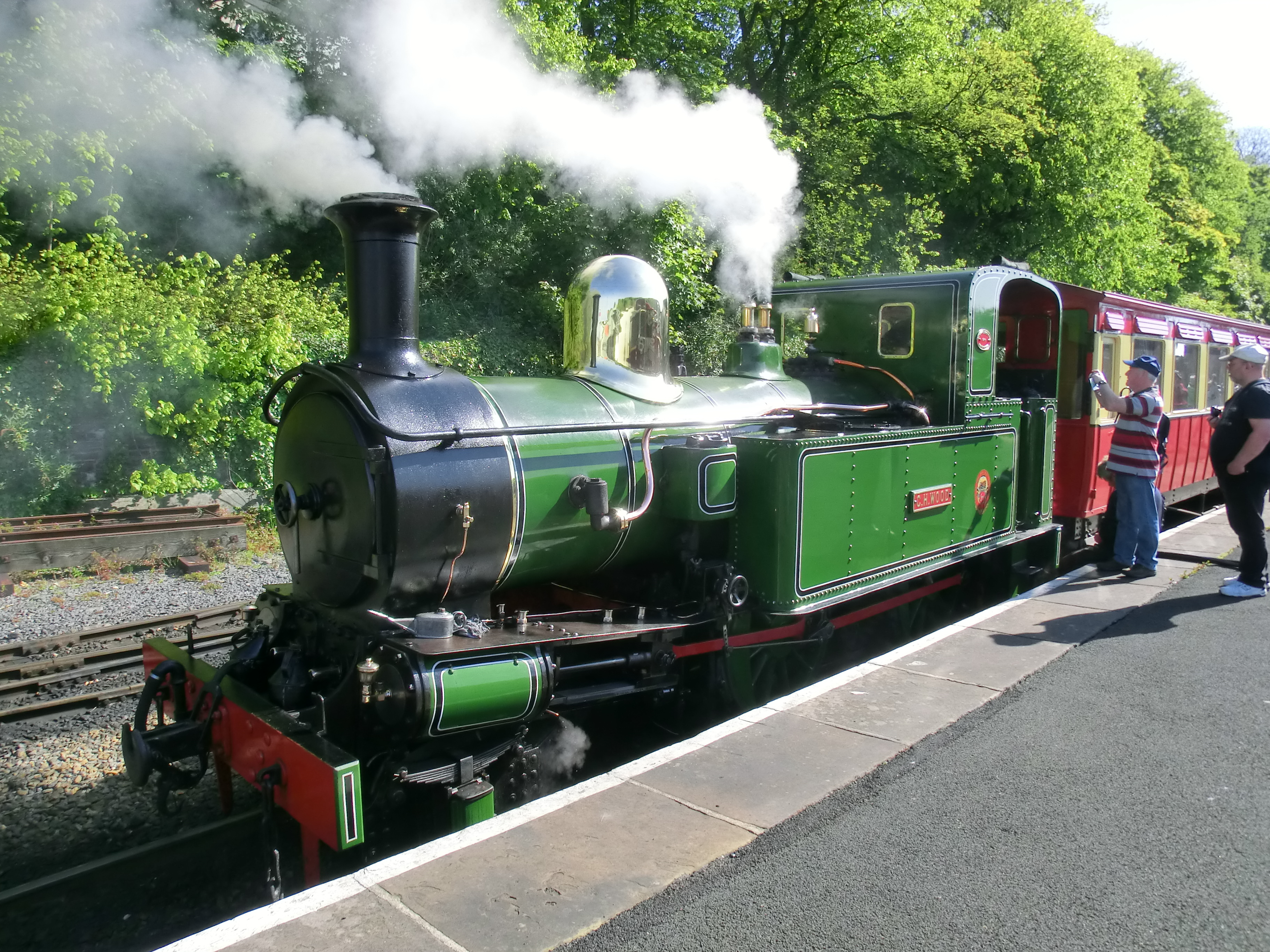
No.11 Maitland Douglas Station 2010

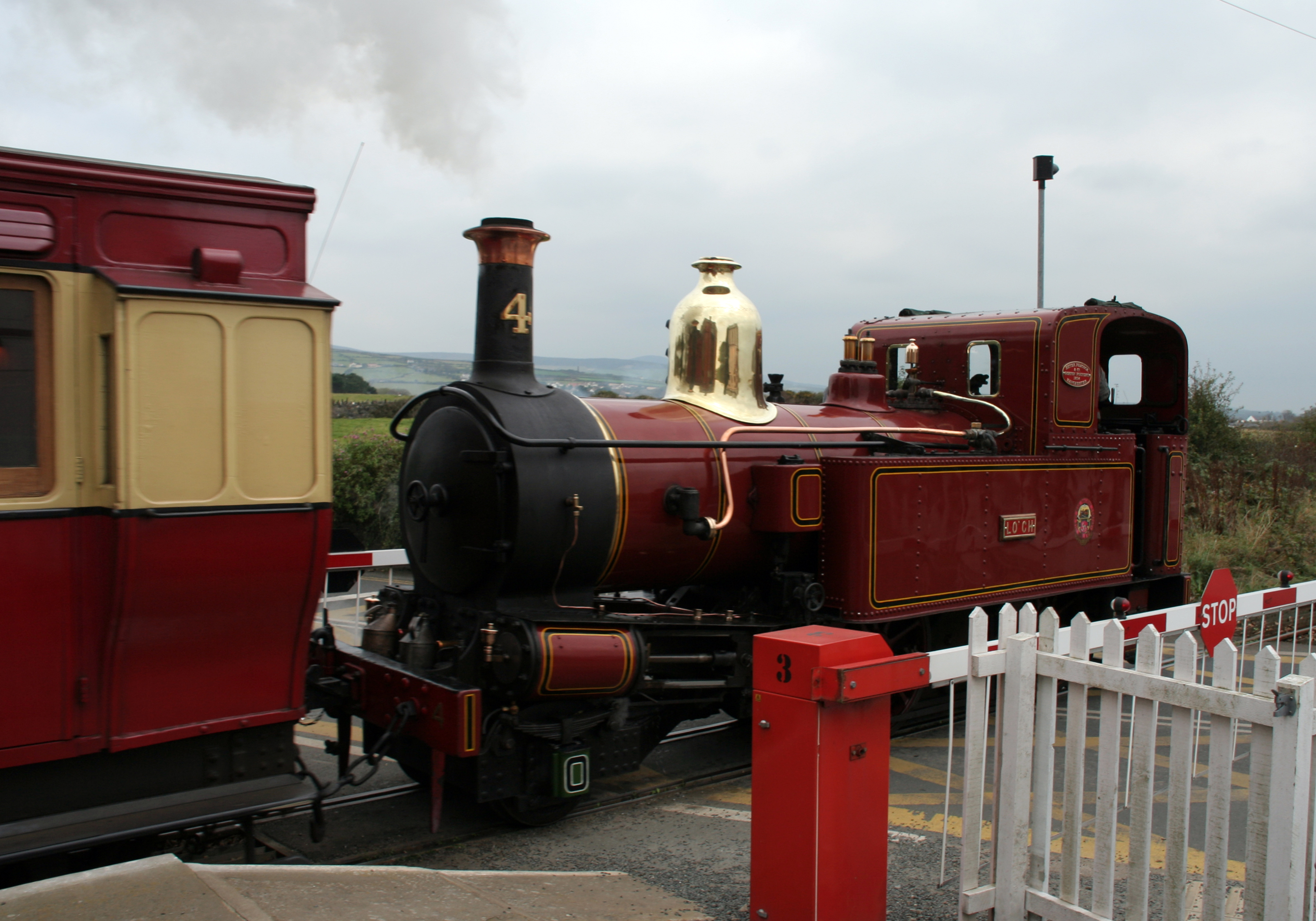
No.4 Loch Port St. Mary Station 2007

=== 1873–1966 ===
The railway operated a modest local train service throughout the year, which was considerably augmented during the summer months to accommodate tourist traffic. Traffic was driven by three requirements: the need to connect with the ferries to and from Britain and Ireland, on-island transportation for tourists, and local passenger traffic. It was common for three or four timetables to be produced each year reflecting seasonal trends, and these would be published in the local newspapers. Winter traffic declined sharply after the 1920s, but it was not until 1960 that the railway was effectively "closed" for spells during the winter, with services only operating on certain days mainly for parcels traffic. This continued until November 1965 when the railway was closed "for essential maintenance to take place". No trains ran in 1966 but the following year it reopened on a seasonal basis as a tourist attraction as detailed above.

=== 1967–1968 Lord Ailsa ===
The entire network was leased by Archibald Kennedy, 7th Marquess of Ailsa and the lines reopened on 3 June 1967 operating an intensive service, especially on the Peel Line, until September; the following year saw a reduced timetable of operation but proved to be the final year of the lines serving Peel and Ramsey. This has become known as the Ailsa Period known for the change of livery to spring green carried by the locomotives. The timetables utilised the Peel and Port Erin lines heavily, whilst there was no service to Ramsey on certain days, and then only a limited service ran.

=== 1969–1972 Port Erin line only ===
From 1969 only the southern route to Port Erin was operated. Services generally operated from May to September thereafter still under the auspices of Lord Ailsa; the former lines remained in situ but disused, save for occasional stock movements to the carriage shed at St John's for the winter storage of rolling stock. A limited oil tanker service operated only in 1969. At this time the now traditional pattern of four trains each way per day was adopted and it is this pattern of operation that broadly speaking remains in place today.

=== 1973–1974 centenaries ===
Lord Ailsa took his five-year option on a 21-year lease and relinquished duties to operate trains from the close of the 1972 season and the Railway Company again took over services with subsidy from the Isle of Man Tourist Board. The centenaries of the Peel and Port Erin lines were commemorated with special trains on the anniversary days in these two years. Services continued to operate on the four each way per day pattern with additional services at peak times in the summer months to coincide with Island events.

=== 1975–1977 curtailments ===
In a cost-cutting measure, trains only operated between Port Erin and Castletown in 1975, and Port Erin and Ballasalla in 1976. The line to Douglas was still maintained as locomotives and rolling stock returned there to receive maintenance. There was much political controversy over the short-line workings and services were ultimately restored in 1977 although rails were lifted on the closed sections during this time. 1977 proved to be the final year of Railway Company operation of the line, again on a familiar seasonal basis with four trains each way per day between May and September.

=== 1978–1986 nationalisation ===
Various timetables were experimented with in the early period of nationalisation; Notable in this period were the Friday only Winter Shoppers trains which ran during the 1981–1982 and 1983-1983 winter periods, with only one train from Port Erin and return each day. Generally trains operated for Easter Week and the full season began at the end of May to coincide with the annual T.T. race period and ran until the last weekend of September. Aside from the popular Santa Trains, which have operated since 1985 the line remained closed in the winter months. Also of note are the shuttle services which operated between Douglas and the country park at Lough Ned (mid-way to Port Soderick), which ran in peak season and often utilised the railcars; a platform was provided for this service, which saw the last regular use of the railcars in passenger service.

=== 1987–1999 anniversaries ===
Trains operated for Easter Week with the main season running from mid-May each year; from 1987 trains ran seven days a week in this period (previously there had been no Saturday service for several years) and many additional and extra timetables ran for the Year of Railways in 1993, the International Railway Festival in 1995 and Steam 125 event in 1998. Certain years also saw skeleton services operating in October and November, in conjunction with various off-season attractions on the Island, although the pattern of passing trains at Ballasalla was adhered to. A familiar pattern during this period was the operation of an additional train on Mondays-Thursdays in July and August which left Douglas mid morning (10:50) and returned from Port Erin at 17:30, utilising the long-closed station at Port Soderick to pass the regular service trains. It was common for a shuttle service to link Port Erin and Castletown during the closure of the Billown Circuit for racing during this time.

=== 2000–2009: New millennium ===
The season was extended so that a daily service also operated during October half term after a three-week closure from the end of September. In some years, Castletown station was used as a passing loop instead of Ballasalla. There was major disruption to services for three years from 2000 when a sewer pipe was laid beneath the railway. This resulted in short line workings from Douglas to Santon, and various shuttles between Port Erin, Port St Mary and Castletown before the full line was reinstated. A courtesy coach was provided during this period to bridge the gap of the closed sections for passengers. The extra peak season train was dropped during this period, and the usual timetable had only four departures from each terminus. From 2007 a commuter service operated during the TT races, and in the first two years this also ran during Manx Grand Prix week.

== Television and film ==
Title	Year	Location	Details
No Limit!	1935	Quarter Bridge & Braddan?	Backdrop to scenes featuring the T.T. Circuit
I See A Dark Stranger	1947	Union Mills & Douglas	Doubling as Ireland, train and carriage interiors used
Seaside Special	1979	Castletown & Port St. Mary	Backdrop to a Chattanooga Choo Choo dance sequence
S.O.S. Titanic	1980	Peel Station (Site Only)	No trains features, also shot at Laxey Harbour
Anna Of The Five Towns	1984	Port Erin Station	Using locomotive No.13 Kissack and booking hall interior
The Ginger Tree	1988	Castletown & Douglas	Doubling as communist Russia with No.11 Maitland
The Train Now Departing...	1988	Douglas & Port Erin	Episode Four "Steam In The Isle Of Man"
Stiff Upper Lips	1998	Castletown & Port St. Mary	Using Manx Northern Railway No.4 Caledonia
Cinderella	2000	Santon Station	Station clock hung to give impression of canopy
Thomas & The Magic Railroad	2000	Castletown Station	Altered and shed used as Shining Time Co-Op
I Capture The Castle	2002	Port St. Mary & Nunnery	Departing trains with No.15 Caledonia
Five Children & It	2004	Castletown Station	Station fitted with temporary canopy and dressed with posters
Legend Of The Tamworth Two	2003	Port Soderick & Crogga	Featuring locomotive No.11 Maitland
Keeping Mum	2004	Foxdale Station	Appears in backdrop to scenes at nearby primary school
Belle	2013	Glenfaba Mill	Mill located adjacent to former railway trackbed

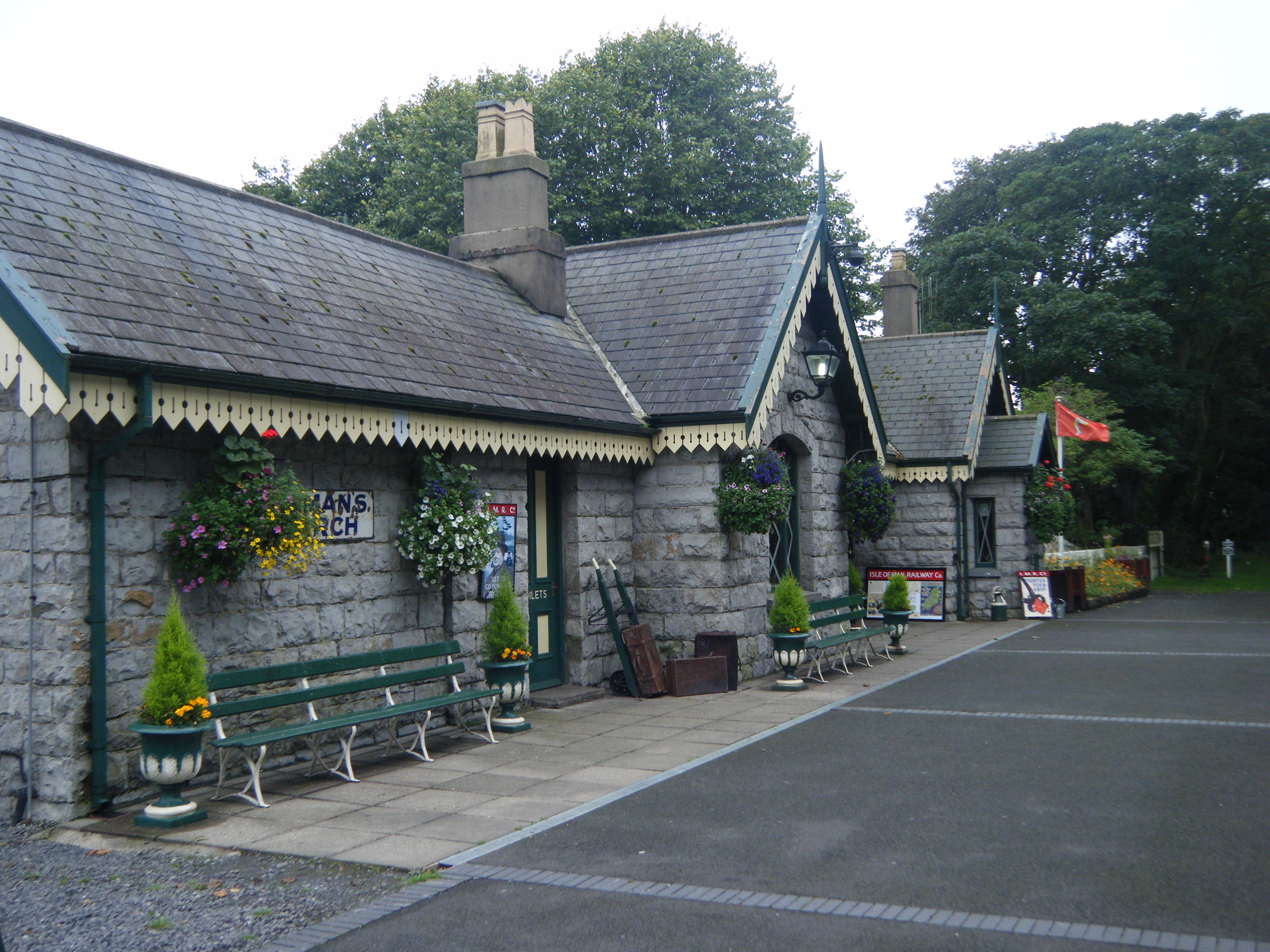
Castletown Station was used extensively during filming of Thomas and the Magic Railroad and was considerably altered for its appearance; for Five Children & It a temporary canopy was fitted to the front of the structure.

In 1976 the BBC series Nationwide featured a piece on the railway when it was under threat of closure. The BBC adaptation of The Ginger Tree notably used the carriage shed at Douglas, lineside scenes and (No.11 Maitland was painted matte black for this production and remained in this guise for the remainder of the 1989 season).

Other television credits for the railway include:

- Wish You Were Here...?
- The Radio One Roadshow
- Lookaround Border News
- North West Tonight
- Oz and James's Big Wine Adventure
- Robot Overlords
- The One Show
- Great Coastal Railway Journeys

== Incidents ==
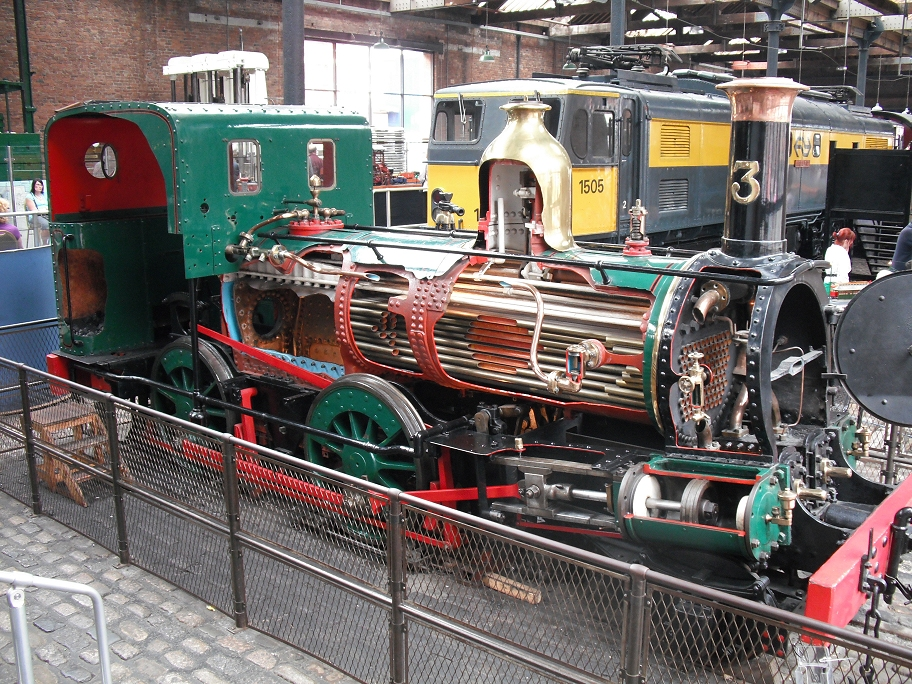
No.3 Pender now displayed as a sectionalised exhibit in the Manchester Science Museum having left the Island in 1978 for these works to take place; this locomotive was involved in the 1925 accident, possibly the worst incident in the railway's long history and was significantly damaged as a result, vacuum braking being installed on all locomotives and rolling stock as a result of the serious nature of the runaway; the locomotive was one of the original trio delivered for the opening of the Peel Line in 1873 with No.1 Sutherland (now in the Isle of Man Railway Museum and No.2 Derby (now scrapped, but with several smaller components retained as spares, notably the pony truck).

- 28 October 1916: The steam locomotive No.5 Mona was derailed in the Nunnery cutting after running into a heap of sand placed on each rail by teenage boys. Only the engine driver was injured; the passenger carriages remained on the track.
- 22 August 1925: A train hauled by No.3 Pender ran into Douglas station with insufficient braking power. Due to a misunderstanding, the guard and brakesman had been left behind at Union Mills, so there was no-one on board the forward and rear brake vans to apply the train handbrakes. The fireman of the train was killed, but the driver, William Costain, escaped unhurt. Vacuum brakes were introduced as a result of the accident.
- 28 November 1928: J.I.C. Boyd mentions a serious head-on collision between a light engine (No.7 Tynwald) and a passenger train on Port Soderick bank, which resulted in the frames of No.10 G.H. Wood being bent. They were bent again in a minor collision at Union Mills in 1968.
- 14 August 2005: A train hauled by No.13 Kissack was derailed on the facing points of the loop when entering Castletown, resulting in the locomotive and carriage F.54 becoming derailed. There were no serious injuries and services were replaced by buses for the remainder of the day while the locomotive was re-railed.
- 19 May 2008: A train hauled by No.4 Loch to Port Erin was involved in a collision with a van at Port Soderick station. There were no reported injuries to the driver of the van or to the 74 passengers and crew on board the train.
- 7 May 2012: A train again hauled by No.4 Loch was involved in a minor collision with a train hauled by No. 13 Kissack, which was awaiting departure from the bay platform at Port Erin, due to the points being incorrectly set.
- 31 December 2022: A New Year dining train hauled by No.11 Maitland struck a tree near Ballabeg Station, causing some damage to the rolling stock, which was reported in the local media; later services were cancelled.

== See also ==
- Isle of Man Railway level crossings and points of interest
- Isle of Man Railway locomotives
- Isle of Man Railway rolling stock
- Isle of Man Railway Museum
- Isle of Man Railway stations
- Isle of Man Steam Railway Supporters' Association
- Isle of Man Transport
- Rail transport in the Isle of Man
- British narrow gauge railways
- Bus Vannin
