= Port St Mary railway station =

Isle of Man railway station

Port St. Mary Railway Station Stashoon Raad-Yiarn Phurt Le Moirrey
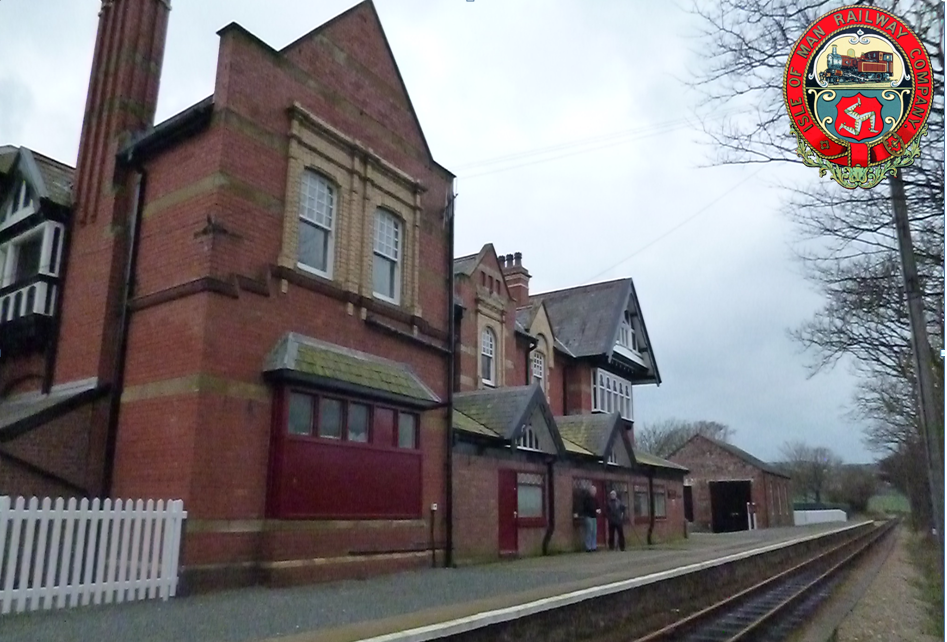

General information
- Location: Station Road, Port St Mary, Isle of Man, IM8 4FW.
- Coordinates: 54.081°N 4.743°W
- System: The Isle of Man Railway Co., Ltd.
- Owner: Isle of Man Government; Department of Infrastructure
- Lines: Port Erin (South) line Between Douglas & Port Erin
- Platforms: One, raised One Goods, Disused
- Tracks: Running line Goods Siding

Construction
- Structure type: Station & Goods Shed
- Parking: Dedicated
- Accessible: 1

History
- Opened: 1 August 1874
- Closed: Seasonally (Since 1965)
- Rebuilt: 1898 / 1901
Location

Port St Mary Railway Station (Manx: Stashoon Raad Yiarn Phurt Le Moirrey) is a station in Port St Mary in the south of the Isle of Man and is served by the Isle of Man Railway, having first opened in 1874 when the line to nearby Port Erin was completed. It forms part of the sole remaining section of the railway which once covered a network of some 46 miles across the island. The station is less than a mile away from the terminus and has no passing loop or run-round facilities, but a siding serving the goods shed was lifted in the 1979 but reinstated in 2002 at the same time as the whole of the permanent way was replaced along the line. When reinstated, the siding was not connected to the imposing goods shed, however in the winter of 2007/2008 rail connections were restored. A second siding which once served the rear of the shed was removed in 1974 and has not been replaced. Both sets of facing points were on the northern approach, the second lifted siding running parallel to the shed access as far as the exterior loading platform.

== Original Station ==
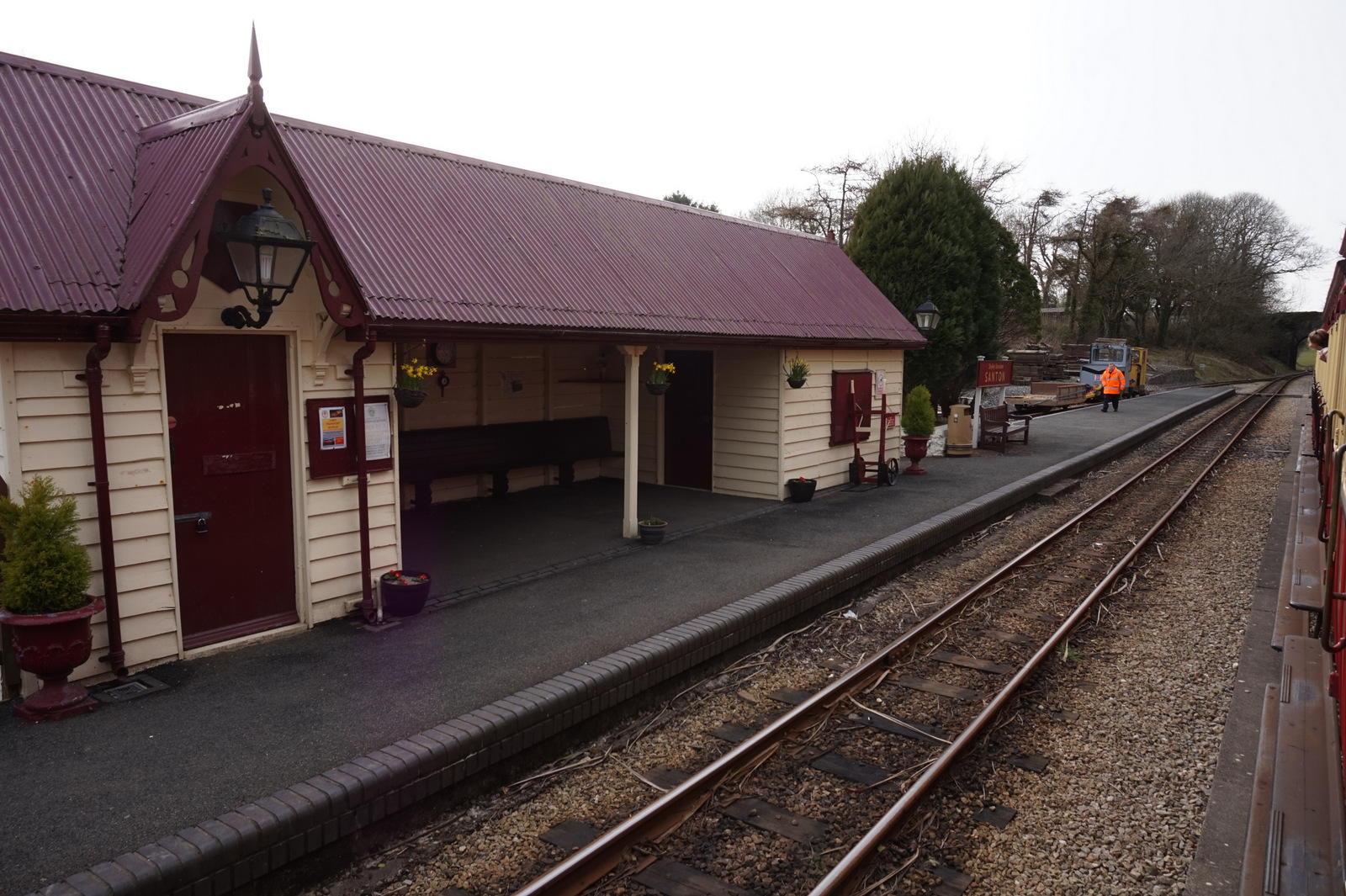
The remaining structure at Santon Station which is very similar to the original building at Port St. Mary which originally featured a "candystripe" corrugated roof according to limited photographic references; a central recessed shelter is flanked by two structures and an overall roof, one portion being staff accommodation, the other porters' facilities. The remaining sole example is believed to be larger than that which was provided at Port St. Mary

=== Timber Structure ===
When opened on 1 August 1874 the site was furnished with a timber structure with zinc roof similar to structures at Santon, Ballasalla and Colby (with only that at Santon remaining in situ today) but with the popularity of the resort in the line's earliest days the decision was taken by the Railway Company to upgrade the site after which the original structure was demolished; few early views survive of this structure, but reveal it to be very similar to the other along the line, notably Port Soderick and Ballabeg.

=== Goods Shed ===
A timber goods shed was provided in 1880 being of similar style to those elsewhere on the route of which no known photographs survive but it is believed to have been similar to that provided at Crosby Station on the Peel Line which was in a "Swiss" style and capable of being relocated. This was replaced by a stone structure as below, which remains extant.

== Replacement Station ==
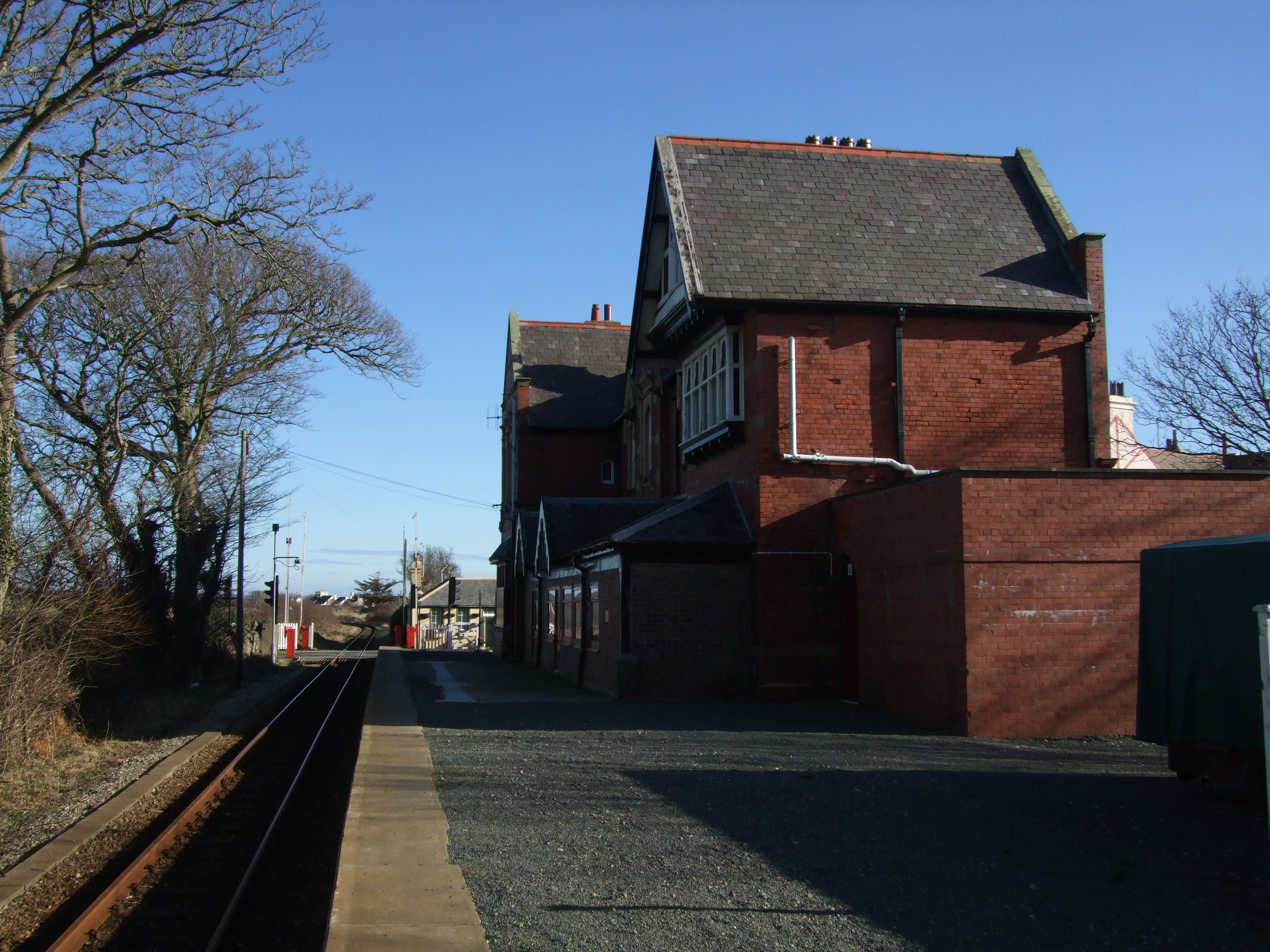
Looking north showing the imposing two-storey structure which replaced a much smaller timber affair; the toilet block is to the right and the line towards Four Roads in the distance

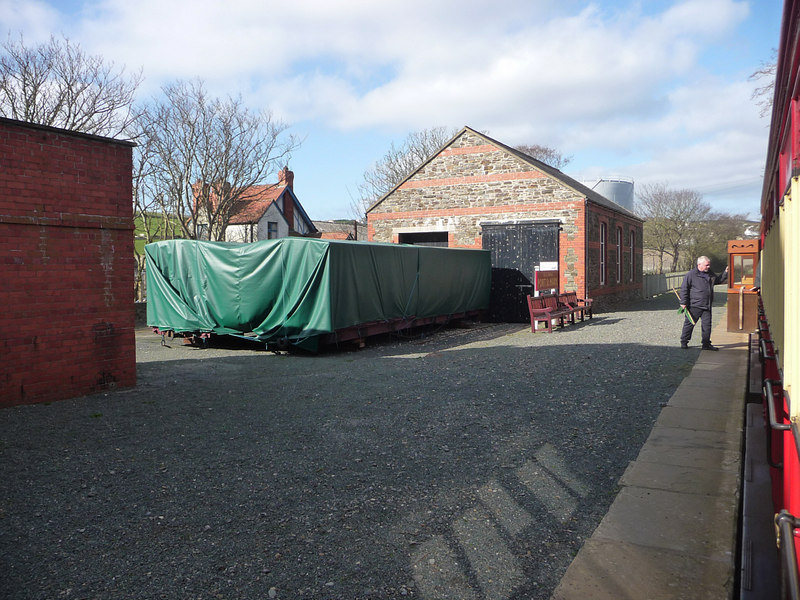
The replacement goods shed, similar to that which also remains at Castletown Station and is today used a volunteer base for the Isle of Man Steam Railway Supporters' Association

=== Station Building (1898) ===
Today's impressive two-storey station building would lead the casual observer to think it to be the railway's terminus which is in fact just under a mile away at Port Erin; it was constructed by a local firm in 1898 to serve the large demand of tourists for whom the village was a popular resort. It is the only "proper" station on the line to not have a passing loop, owing to its close location to the southern terminus. The station remains under the ownership of the railway but has been largely out of use. In 1980 the station was converted by the company Campamarina for use in conjunction with their Trailblazers holiday scheme and was used as a hostel (the buildings at Castletown Station were similarly treated at the same time). At this time the railway passed over the use of the whole building, and the station staff were subsequently housed in a garden shed-type structure on the platform. When the usage change, the canopy structure that runs parallel to the platform was bricked in and remains so today, although latterly the station master is once again housed in the building itself, albeit in a smaller office using part of the original ladies' waiting room. The ground floor consists of a large reception room with open fireplace and toilet facilities; formerly there was a refreshment room.

=== Goods Shed (1902) ===
Of the same construction as the shed at Castletown Station and built at the same time by local builders, the goods shed here is located on the south western side of the station building and features rail connected doors at either end as well as platform height openings at the elevations and rear; it also boasts an external loading platform and originally had associated awnings, lost in more recent times. It is constructed from local rubble stone and features red brick quoins throughout with three large windows on the railway-side; as built a large skylight was also featured on the rear roof panel. For a time it was leased by Campamarina (as above), and the northern doorway was for a time bricked up and rendered, with only a small doorway in this section for access. It is commonly used for storage only and from 2020 was used for the decontamination of asbestos from the railway's non-service locomotives; in 2022 it became home to locomotive No.5 Mona which was cosmetically restored by volunteers of the Isle of Man Steam Railway Supporters' Association. Internally the goods shed is rail accessible and half its floorspace is at platform height; the second set of doors are accompanied by a short spur which allows onward transit of goods from road vehicles.

== Filming ==
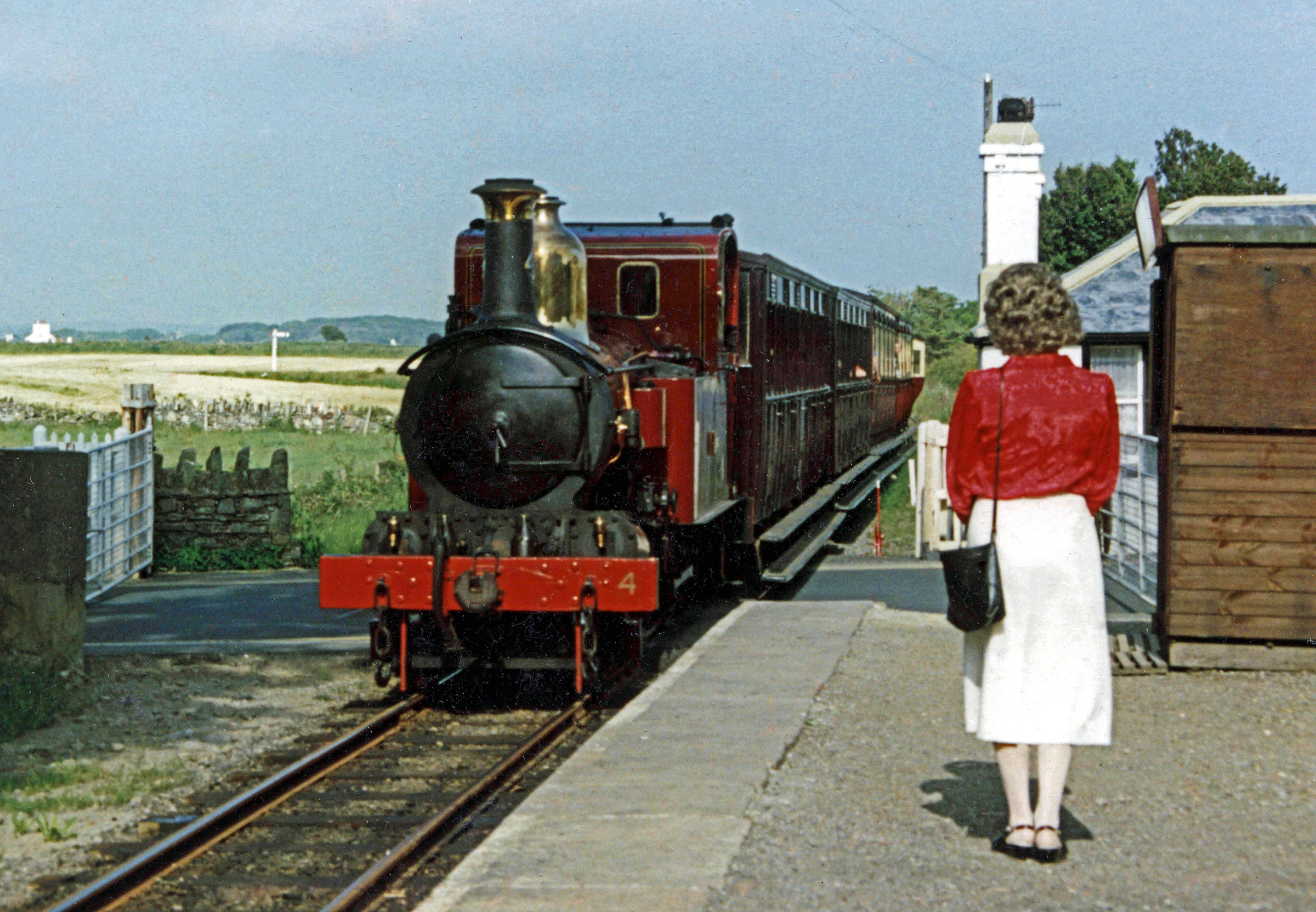
No. 4 Loch calling at the station in 1988 when staff accommodation was in the hut on the right

The goods shed was used as the set for Burnett Stone's workshop on Muffle Mountain for the filming of Thomas and the Magic Railroad along with several other railway locations. The engines of the Isle of Man Railway however did not appear in the film. For filming purposes the interior of the shed was dressed to become a workshop where the engine Lady resided; at this time the fabric of the building was also restored, with new external doors and improved lighting. The exterior also saw use in 2001 when it was used for a night shoot for the Channel Four production of Cinderella which also featured the locomotive Caledonia, then carrying the deep blue livery. Sequences for various other productions have used the station in more recent times, these include The Ginger Tree in 1988, The Brylcreem Boys in 1999, Legend Of The Tamworth Two in 2003 and various episodes of documentaries and travelogues featuring the island, notably Wish You Were Here...? and a 1979 episode of the BBC show Seaside Special which used the platform and trains as part of a dance routine montage to Chattanooga Choo-Choo featuring the station prominently.

== Today ==
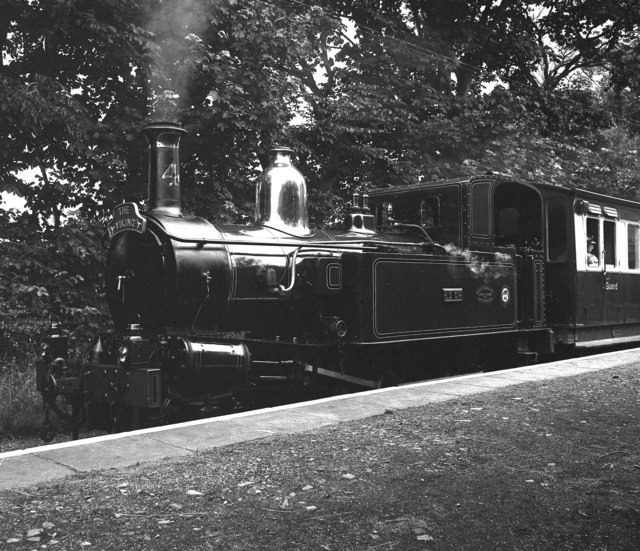
No.4 Loch at the station in 1979 shortly after refurbishment and application of maroon livery

In keeping with current policy, the station received new bi-lingual nameboards in 2008 in a standard maroon and cream colour scheme (the previous colouring here had been black, white and grey). On the northerly side of the level crossing there is a gatekeepers cottage which is now a private dwelling. To the rear of the station is the Station Hotel. From August 2014 the station became unstaffed for the remainder of the railway's season with passengers boarding and alighting purchasing tickets elsewhere. Train guards now operate the barriers which protect the line from the adjacent road to the village. During special events on the railway the station has been used as a drop off point for shuttle buses to Cregneash Folk Museum for Island At War each summer and the Heritage Open Days that are staged by Manx National Heritage each October. The goods shed remains in railway hands and is used for storage purposes only, housing one of three remaining closed vans until the winter of 2013 when this was moved to Port Erin to form part of a new display in the railway museum. The goods yard is used to store other railway items, notably the former railings from Port Erin Station. The station remains a popular drop off point for walkers who then use the coastal footpath beyond to reach Port Erin and return by rail in the summer months. It is also the nearest station for the national folklore museum to which a limited bus service is operated.

== Recent ==
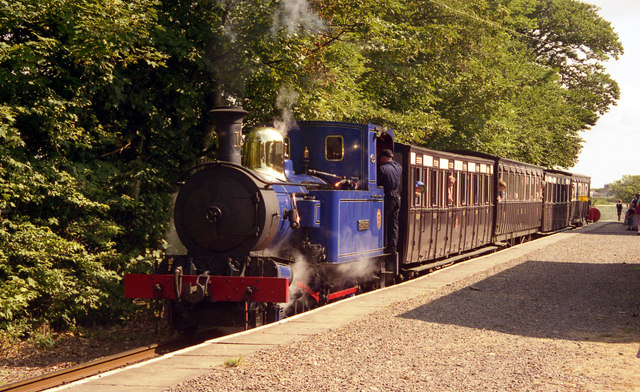
No.12 Hutchinson at the station in 1991 in the blue livery

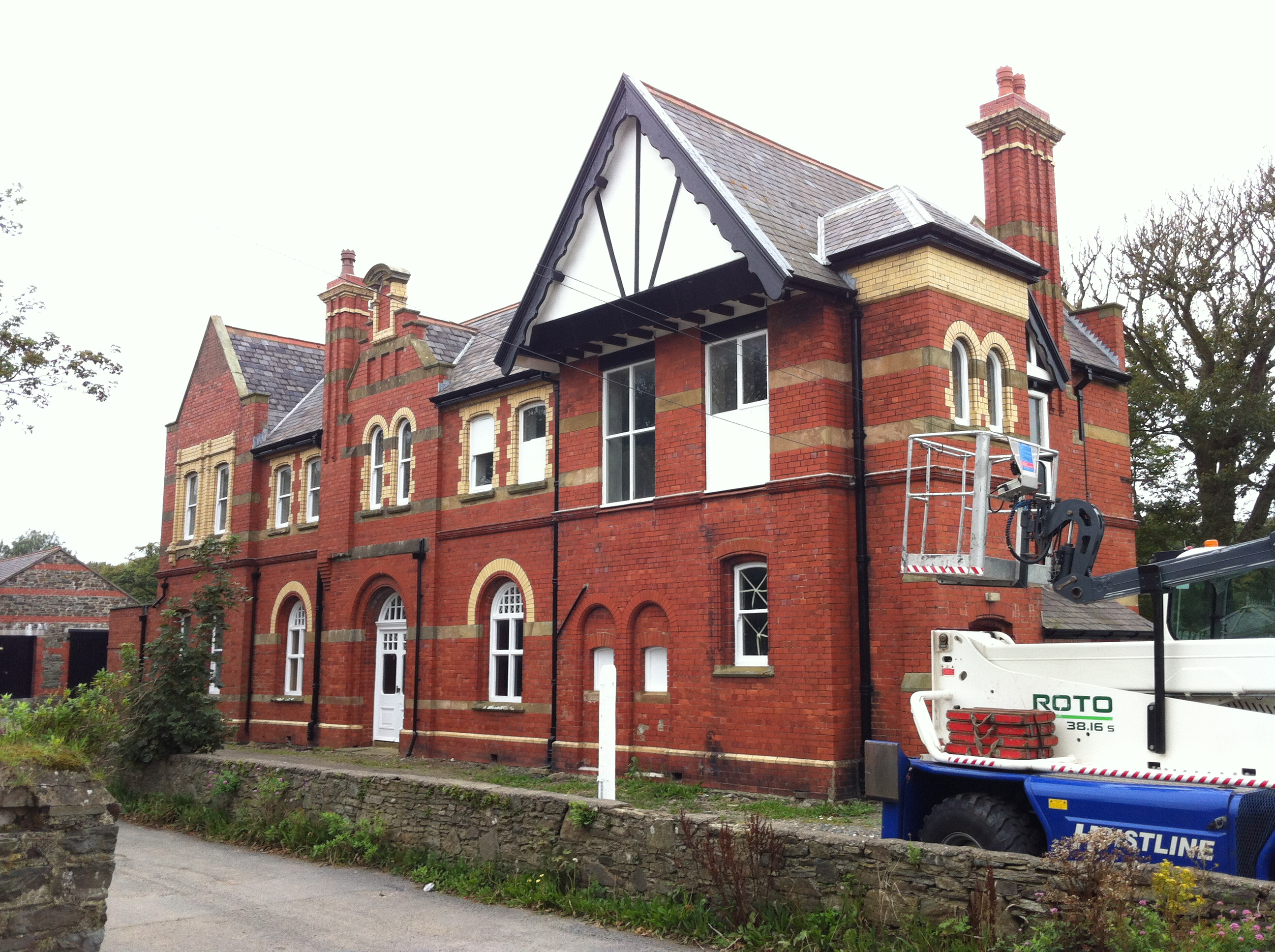
The rear elevation of the former booking hall in 2012

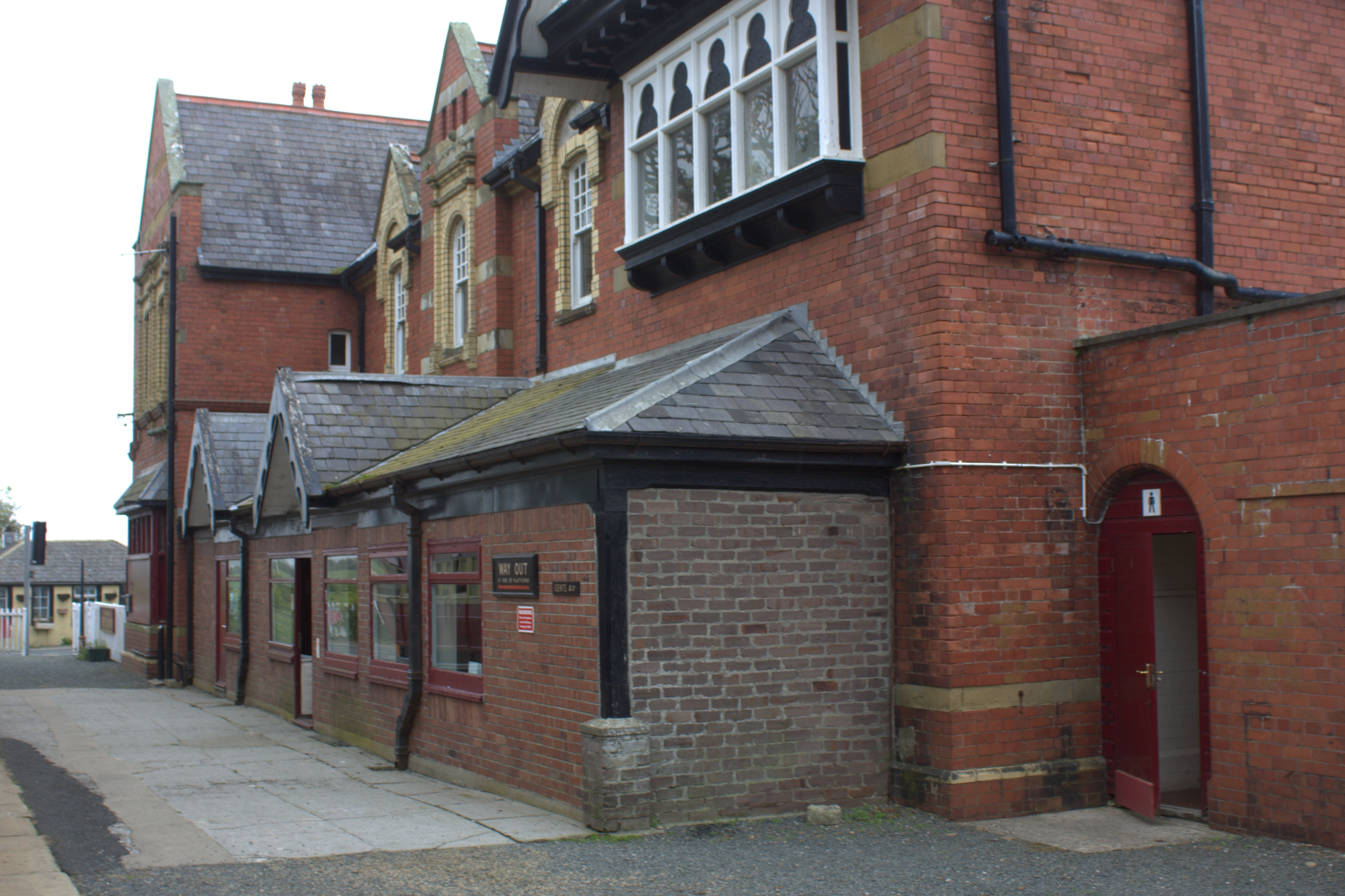
The front elevation showing the former open shelter which was bricked in to provide a waiting room in 1979

=== Campamarina & Trailblazers (1982-1989) ===
The entire site was leased to an outdoor pursuits company in 1982 who converted the upper storey into hostel accommodation, with railway staff relegated to a wooden shack on the platform during this time; the booking hall was fitted with a servery and a new fireplace installed as well as shower rooms.

=== 1997 Re-Use ===
Having been largely unoccupied for several years, the station masters' accommodation was relocated in 1997 to the building itself and the garden shed structure was removed. The building itself has been the subject of several restoration/conversion attempts but all of these have been fruitless to date.

=== Apartment Proposal (2008) ===
In 2008 a local developer is understood to have received permission to convert the building into apartments, whilst retaining the frontage of the platform area, removing the bricked-up canopy added in 1979 and restoring much of the charm of the railway-oriented site. This plan never came to fruition and the building remained largely unoccupied.

=== Offices Proposal (2012) ===
The buildings were placed on the market in 2012, and subsequently sold subject to planning, for conversion to offices. This application was denied on the grounds of insufficient parking and to date the station building lies empty while the shed remains in railway hands and used for storage. The station was then put up for sale and the former gasworks land to the rear is proposed to become another residential area following the closure of the works in 2012; the housing development remains ongoing to the rear and the gasworks site razed, the station is now unoccupied.

=== Vacation (2015) ===
The station remained staffed by railway personnel until the summer of 2014 when it was closed with only the toilets and waiting area being open. This practice ceased in 2020 when the toilets were found to be in a parlous state of repair. Today the station remains open but provides no passenger facilities. A further application to convert the premises into a toy museum with office space and cage was also proposed in 2018 but these failed to materialise and the building remains out of use.

== Environs ==
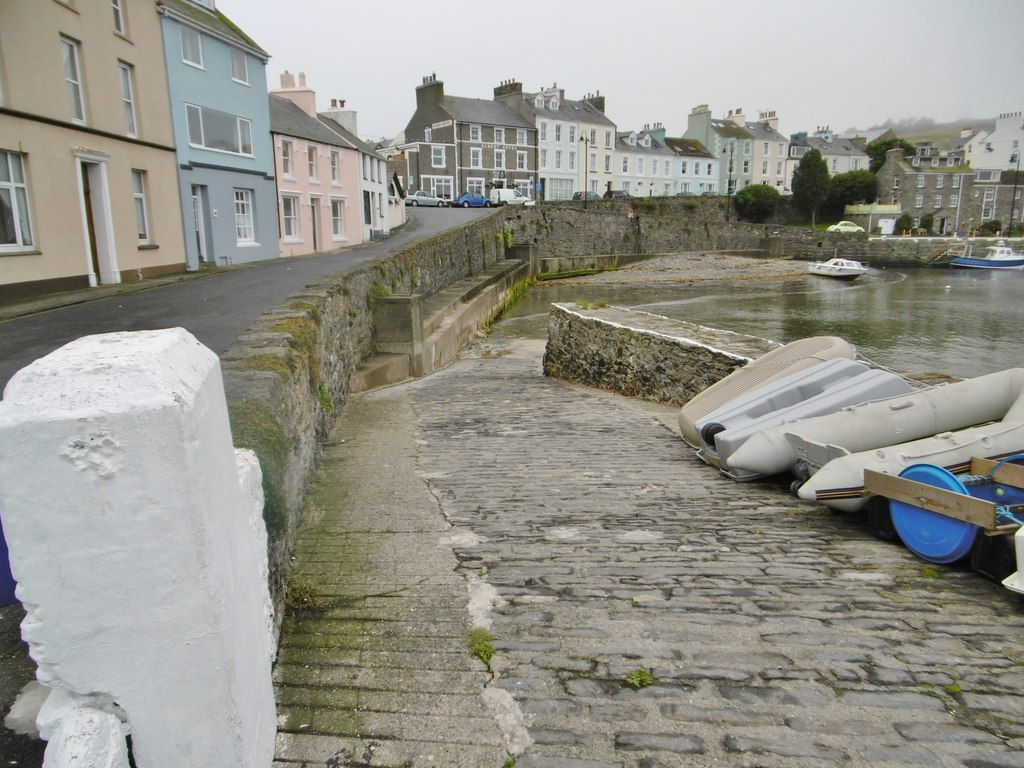
The slipway at the picturesque lower harbour in the village which is approximately a ten-minute walk once the train is disembarked

The village only received a station at all following public outcry when the proposed route was announced, with a request to deviate the line also being submitted, This was not carried out however, resulting in today's station being some distance from the heart of the village it serves. Being some distance from the village, the nearest point of interest is the Station Hotel which lies behind the station. Also to the rear was the gasworks (closed and demolished in 2012) followed by a walk of some half mile before reaching the outskirts of the village. The first building of interest close to the station is the local primary school Scoill Phurt Le Moirrey which was only established in the year 1994. Thereafter lies the village proper with its lines of shop fronts leading down to the harbour. A crossroads close to the station directs traffic either to the village, the coast at Gansey Bay or the folk museum at Cregneash and The Sound (latterly styled as Lands End Of Mann. In the opposite direction the road leads to a roundabout which serves Port Erin, Gansey and Rushen, the local primary school being located nearby. To the northern side of the station is another level crossing at Four Roads, automated in 2001 though the original crossing lodge remains extant.

== Routes ==
Preceding station	Isle of Man Railway	Following station
Port Erin	Port Erin Line	The Level

== See also ==
- Isle of Man Railway stations
- Port St Mary
