= Castletown railway station =

Station on the Isle of Man

Castletown Railway Station Stashoon Raad-Yiarn Valley Chashtal
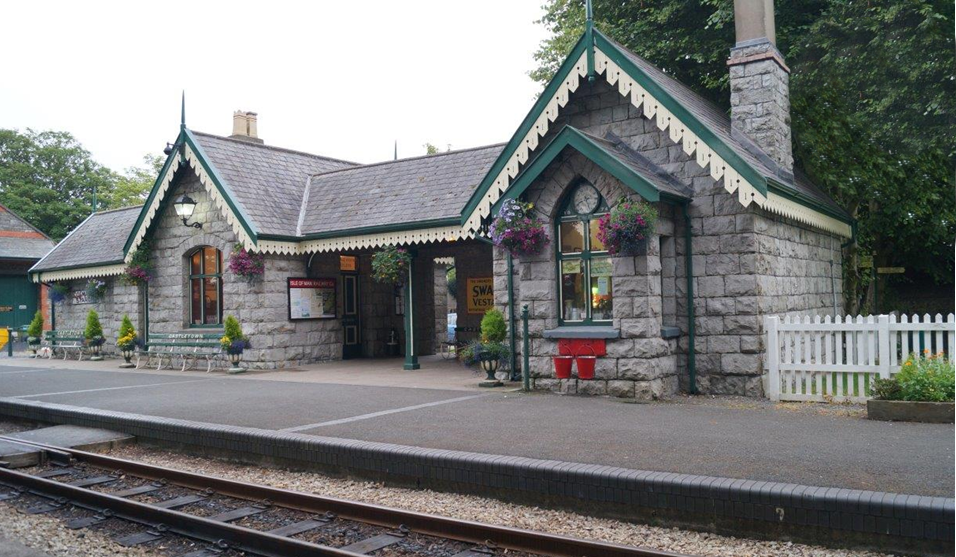

General information
- Location: Station Road, Off Victoria Road, Castletown, IM9 1EF. Isle of Man
- Coordinates: 54°04′44″N 4°38′58″W
- System: Isle of Man Railway
- Owner: Isle of Man Government; Department of Infrastructure
- Lines: Port Erin (South) Line; Between Douglas & Port Erin
- Platforms: Two, Raised Half-Height; One Goods & One Livestock
- Tracks: Two Running Lines, Passing Loop; Two Sidings (Goods & Livestock)
- Connections: Bus Vannin; North & Southbound

Construction
- Structure type: At-grade
- Platform levels: 1
- Parking: Dedicated Patrons' Car Park
- Cycle facilities: Yes
- Accessible: Yes
- Architect: James Cowle
- Architectural style: Victorian

Other information
- Status: Staffed Seasonally; March - November
- Website: www.castletownstation.im

History
- Opened: 2 August 1874
- Closed: 1965–1966 (Railway Closed); 1967–2000 (Seasonally); 2001–2002 (Short-Line Working); 2003-Date (Seasonally)
- Rebuilt: 1901-1902 – Canopy & Veranda; 1993-1994 – Restored & Reopened
- Original company: Isle of Man Railway Co., Ltd.

Key dates
- 1874: Station Built & Opened
- 1901: Canopy & Veranda Added
- 1902: Goods Shed Erected
- 1910: Loading Dock & Platform
- 1953: Veranda Removed
- 1966: Entire Network Closed
- 1994: Canopy Removed
- 1998: Half-Height Platforms Added
- 2002: Temporary Terminus (I.R.I.S.)
- 2017: Souvenir Shop Created
- 2022: Replica Advertisement Hoarding
- 2024: 150th Anniversary Plaque
- 2026: Replica Cattle Dock Added

Passengers
- 1874-Date; Goods, Freight & Livestock 1874–1965; Container ("Mantainor") Traffic 1967–1968; Bus Replacement (Schools) 2012–2013

Services
Patrons' Toilets, Waiting Room, Booking Facilities, Historic Displays, Railwayana Dioramas, Gift Shop, Model Railway Exhibition, Advertisement Hoarding
Location

Castletown Railway Station (Manx: Stashoon Raad Yiarn Valley Chashtal) is an intermediate station on the Isle of Man Railway on the Isle of Man forming part of sole remaining section of the once extensive network that operated across the island. The station is the busiest of the railway's intermediate stations, being the closest to a number of local visitor attractions. In peak season service trains often pass here, making the station one of the railway's more active stopping places. The station occupies a site within walking distance of the main town and is in close proximity to the local playing fields.

== Origins ==
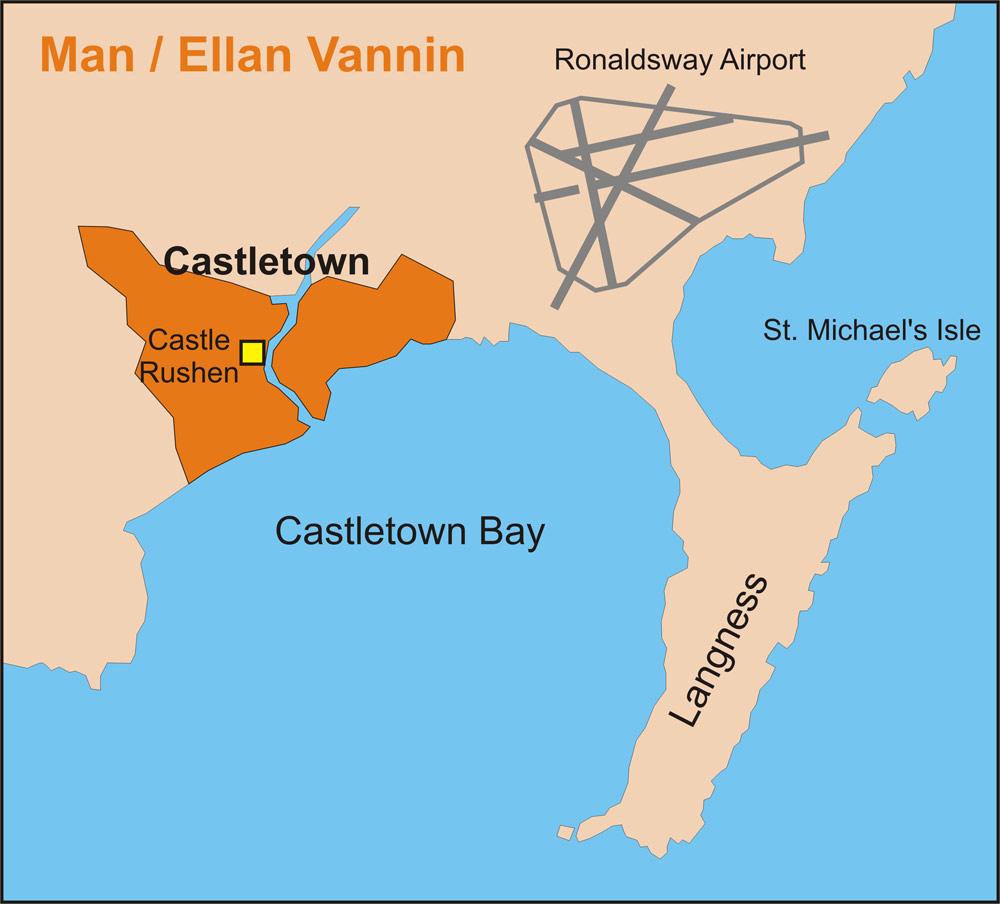

This is an original station on the Isle of Man Railway situated on the north-eastern edge of the town of Castletown. When the railway was first constructed the town had until ten years previously been the island's capital and therefore a substantial station was provided. Although the most extensive intermediate stopping place on the line, it remains some distance from the town itself, being a brisk ten-minute walk to the centre of the town. One of the railway's considerations was originally to terminate at this station, but plans were made to extend the line so that the terminus would be on the quayside. These never came to fruition and the site of today's station is the original one. The size of the station site and associated buildings can be attributed to the town's importance as the capital of the island and seat of parliament until 1869 when Douglas was made the capital. In the intervening time there has been much development of residential areas so that today the station is considered to be in the town itself. In more recent times the town's close proximity to the island's only airport has ensured that it remains a busy residential and commercial area, being the nearest built-up area to the runways. Until 1967 the station was the closest to the airport, but the establishment of Ronaldsway Halt in that year effectively gave a more convenient place to alight for potential commuters.

== Location ==
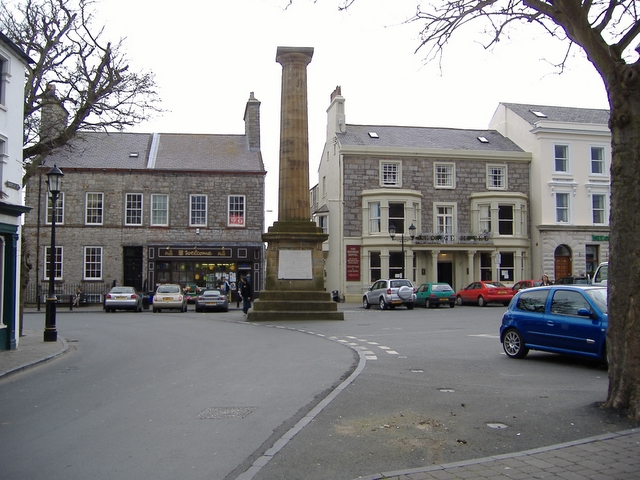
The historic market square, parade and George Hotel with the Smelt Monument at its centre, a short walk from the station

Despite the town's importance (it served as the island's capital until 1869, just five years before the railway's arrival) the railway station is some distance from the centre of the town, at the north-easterly side. The railway company considered many various alternative sites for the station before settling upon the location; a cursory view of a map of the line reveals that between the preceding station (Ballasalla) and the following one (Ballabeg) the line deviates considerably from its course. Despite this, the station has always been one of the most active on the line, providing a source of much freight and goods traffic over the years. Since the station was established the town has spread considerably to the extent that today is surrounded along one side by both residential and industrial premises, including a petrol station and car sales establishment. The main attractions of the town are a short walk from the station, an approximate five-minute walk from the station along the bank of the Silverburn River leading to the heart of the town which surrounds the inner harbour. The town itself was considered to be second only to Douglas in importance to the island; with its bustling harbour and active agricultural scene, the station's importance remained until the final days of operation with livestock being transported from the station's cattle dock (the remains of which are still visible today) until the final year the railway operated its full network in 1965, although the line did reopen to passengers only later. Close to the station are the local primary school at Victoria Road, the medical centre in the Sandfield Complex, the local Morton Hall, and Qualtrough's Timber Yard, all in walking distance.

== Structures ==
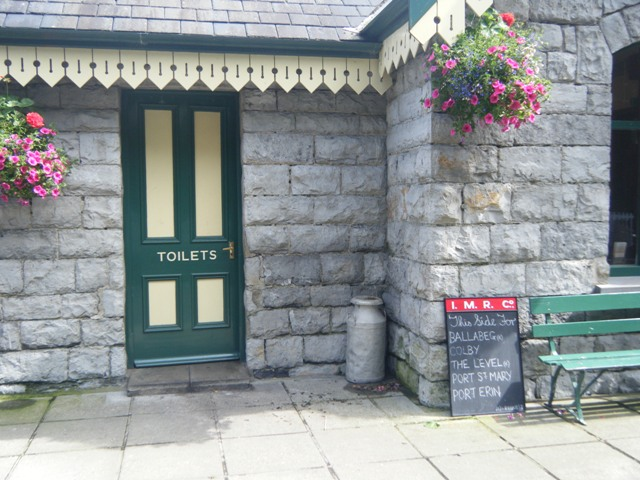
Period details on the platform provided by the Friends Of... volunteer group to enhance the historic structure during operational periods.

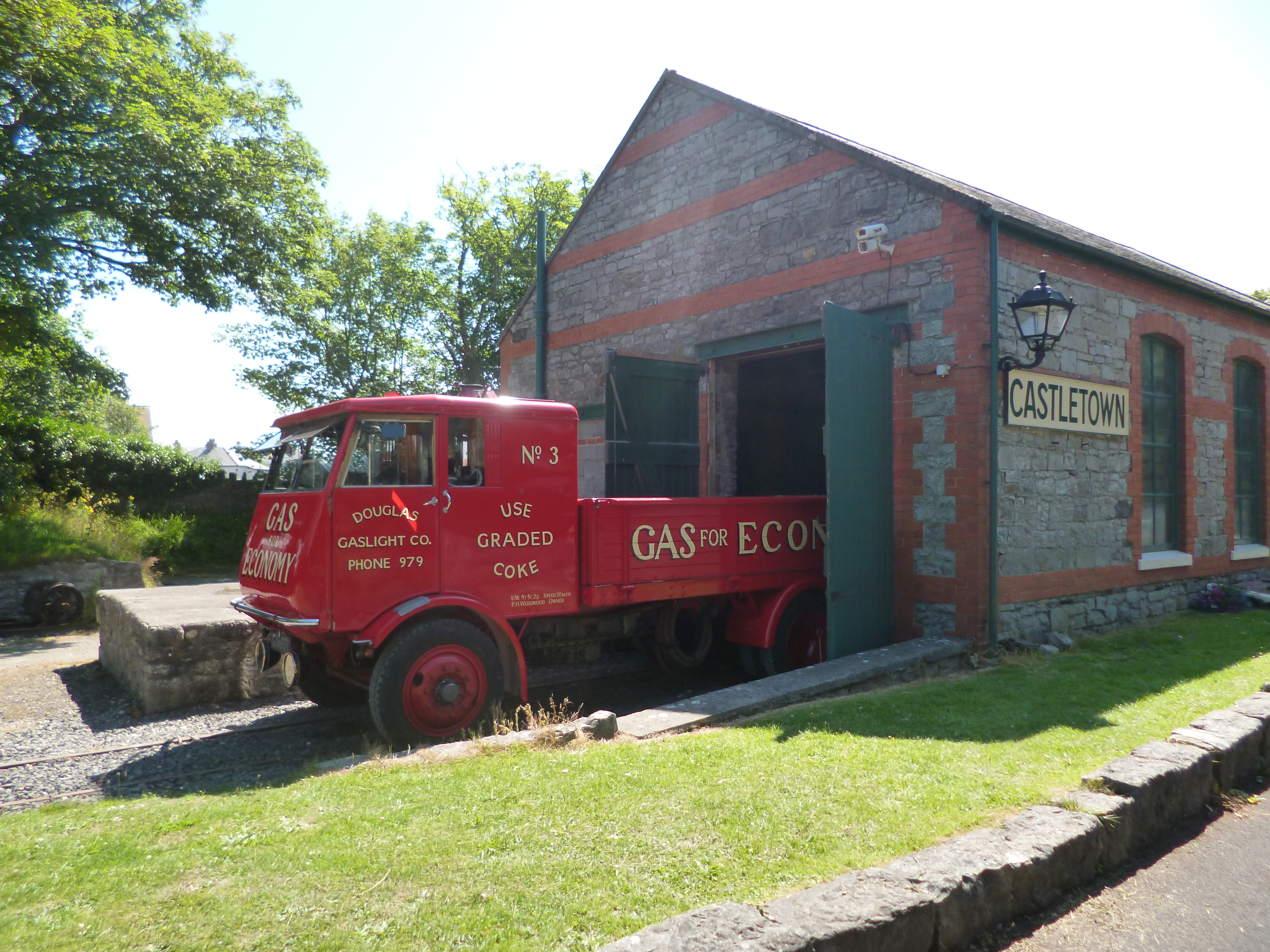
Sentinel steam wagon outside the goods shed during one of the Rush Hour weekend events commonly held across the Easter period until 2019.

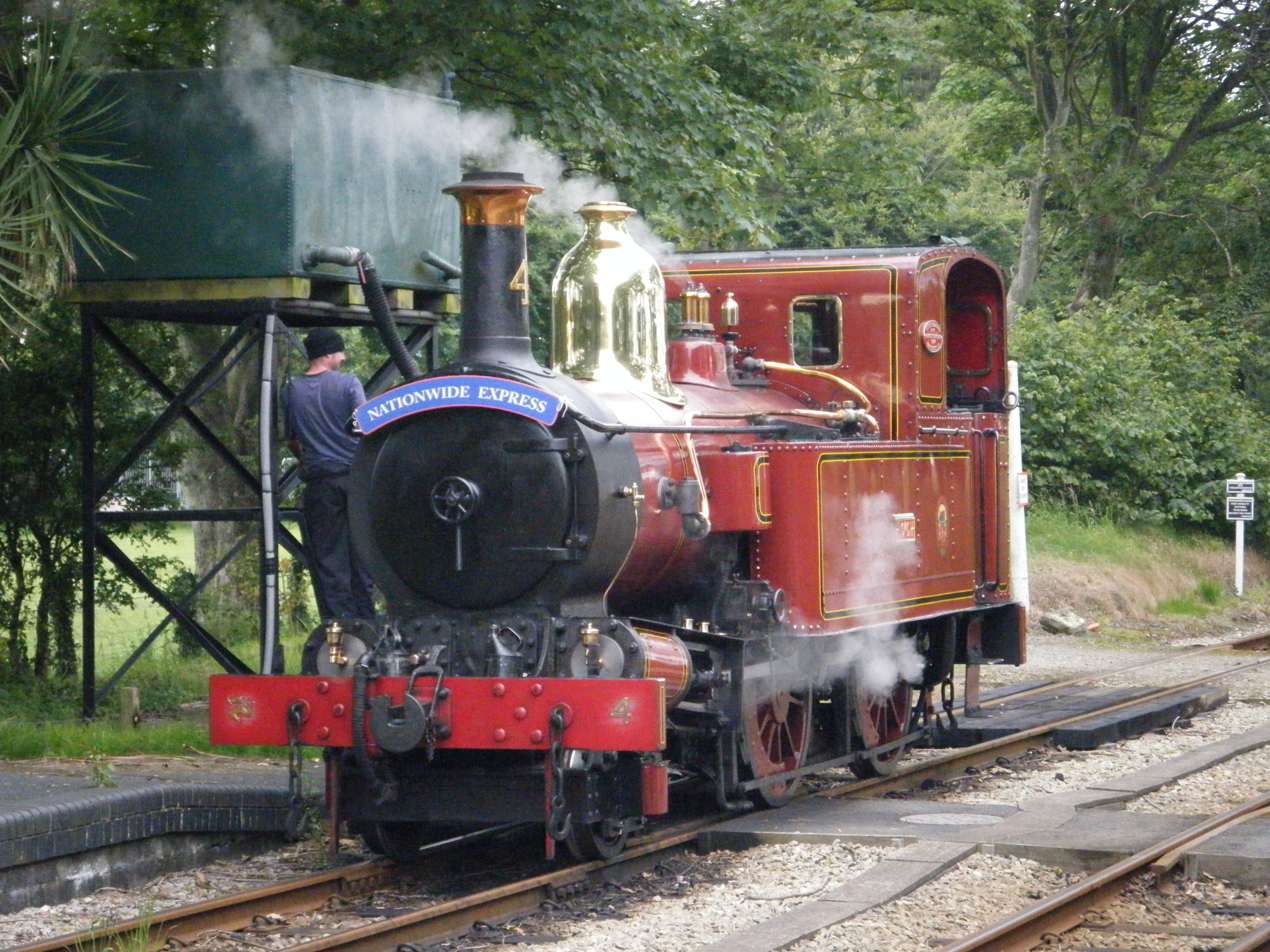
No.4 Lochtaking water at the station while on special duties with the Nationwide Express, one of several themed and charter trains which the station serves on a regular basis.

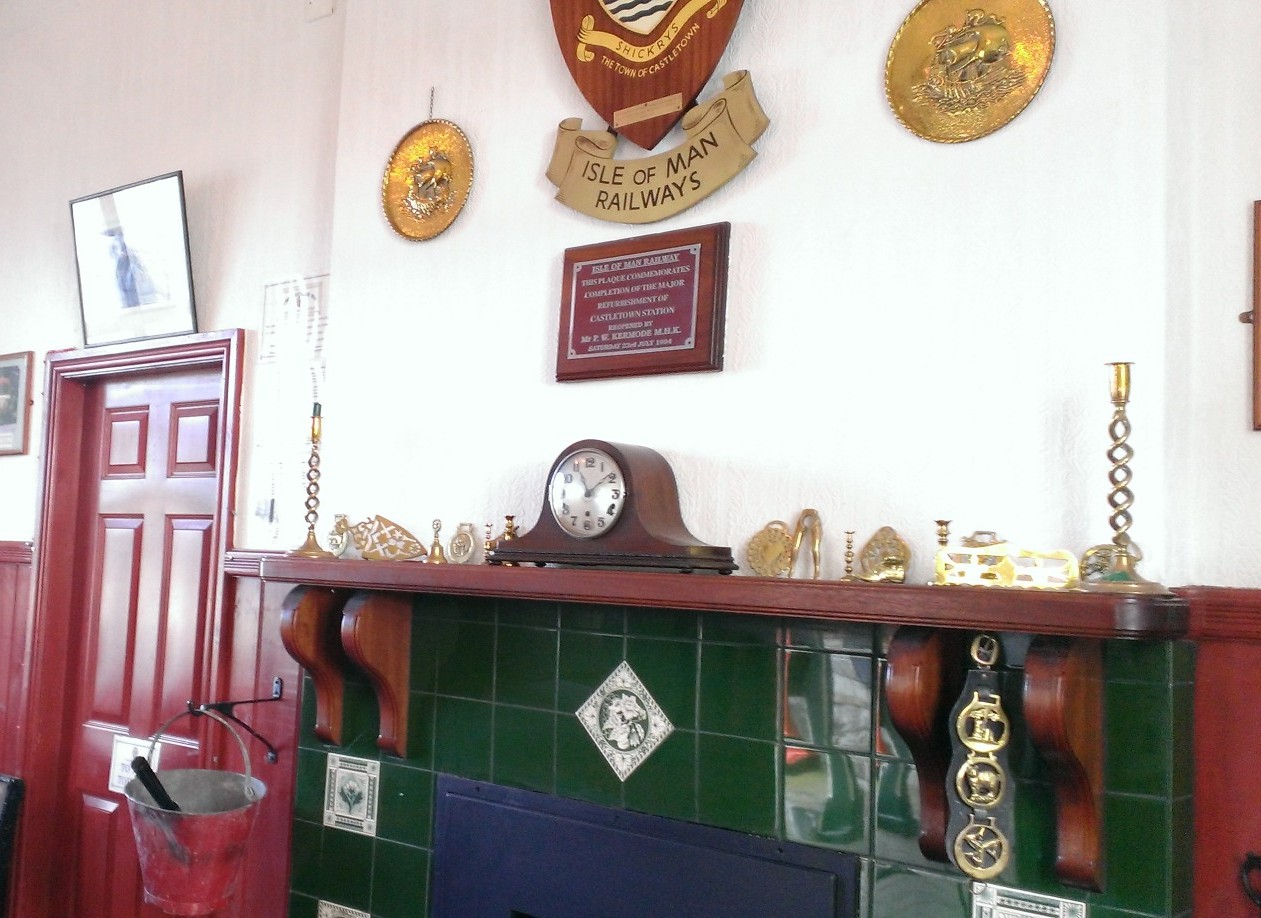
The restored waiting room at the station is the focal point of the building and is tended to by the Friends Of... volunteers regularly who provided all the display materials, ornaments and photographic materials.

=== Station Building ===
When the line opened in 1874 this station was furnished with a stone structure built in the distinctive grey limestone found at nearby Scarlett Pointon, (the original station at Port Erin was of identical design but construction was of local slate). The floor plan was an enlarged version of the wooden buildings used elsewhere on the Port Erin Line at Santon, Ballasalla and Colby; by the turn of the century it became apparent that this was insufficient for the requirements of this busy town and the station building was enlarged in 1903 to its present design. Facilities were improved considerably and the structure housed a station master's office, toilets and general and ladies waiting rooms. This was followed by the addition of a canopy and veranda (the latter lost in 1956) to the station building in 1910 to provide additional passenger shelter.

=== Goods Shed ===
The station was provided with a timber second class goods shed upon the opening in 1874, believed to be similar in construction to those elsewhere on the system; by the turn of the twentieth century it became apparent that the town was an important location for import of goods so, in 1902 a new stone-built structure with red brick quoins and detailing was constructed, identical to that provided at Port St. Mary. This featured rail access at both ends as well as doors at both rail and platform level and an exterior loading bank at the northern end. Until 1994 the rear siding at the station also extended far beyond its current limit, also serving the current car park and rear platform-height doors, this was removed to create additional car parking. This saw much use until the decline of the 1960s and later saw use as a camping hostel before returning to railway use in 2008 by which time a permanent way team were based there. Today the structure is used only for storage and is occasionally open to the public as part of railway events annually, when it is used to store goods stock and road vehicles. It became a listed structure in 2008.

=== Water Tower ===
Established in the earliest years of the railway, the original water tower at the station was constructed of local limestone, again quarried from nearby Scarlett Point and was fed from a well beneath it by means of a hand pump in the tank house beneath the tank itself. This was demolished in 1978 and owing to the depth of the well the majority of stonework was emptied into the hole as rubble, while some was retained to provide edging for new lawns and flower beds. It was not replaced until 1999 when the station served as a temporary terminus during short line workings. The new tank is of metal framed construction and is served by mains water; this facility is still used in conjunction with charter services, notably when No. 8 Fenella is used, having smaller side tanks which require replenishing more frequently, or when Ultimate Driving Experience trains call at the station. The current tank is sited to the south-west of the original.

=== Restoration work ===
The station was extensively renovated in the winter of 1993/1994. A new peaked roof was constructed over the gentlemen's toilets, and the old wooden canopy removed and window apertures converted into archways. At this time the station master's office was halved in size to create a booking hall and a new internal ticket hatch installed, the original being blocked off the waiting room was also reopened, having been closed for over 30 years. The overhauled station was reopened with suitable ceremony later that year by local politician Phil Kermode who at the time was the minister with responsibility for the railway. During the winter of 2012 the partition in the booking hall was removed, recreating the full sized office, and the fireplace reinstated; the original ticket hatch was also brought back into use. In the summer months the station building is adorned with flower baskets and period features such as milk churns (a nod to the station's former importance for handling goods and freight traffic), reproduction notice boards and enamelled signage reinstated on the exterior walls based upon period photographs. This work was carried out by the Friends Of... group.

== Displays ==
=== Locomotive frames ===
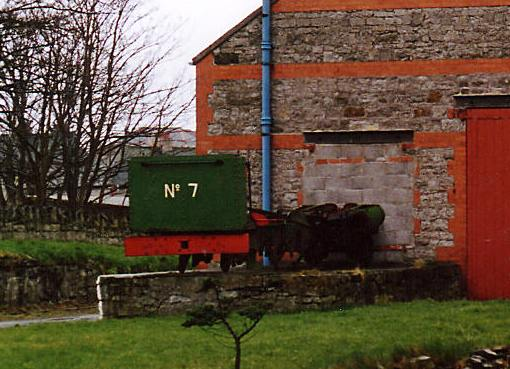
The frames and bunker of locomotive No.7 Tynwald on display on the loading platform; these are now off-island

The former goods shed exterior loading platform became the home in 1985 to the remaining component frames of the railway company's 1880 locomotive No.7 Tynwald for display purposes, although many major components were by that time scrapped; the display consisted of the main frames, cylinders, coal bunker, with a set of carriage wheels substituting for the pony truck. The locomotive had not been used in traffic since 1947 and was purchased by the group in 1978 following the nationalisation of the railway, to save it from scrap. The frames were initially stored at Ballasalla Station, later being removed to Santon Station before being relocated here. They were owned by the now-defunct Isle Of Man Railways & Tramways Preservation Society, and for a period they were moved to off-site storage before being returned to the goods platform in the autumn of 2009 only to depart again in 2012 due to issues with railway's management and the owners. They now reside on the Southwold Railway in Suffolk and await restoration. There is currently nothing displayed on the platform although the Friends Of... group have future plans.

=== Triskelion ===
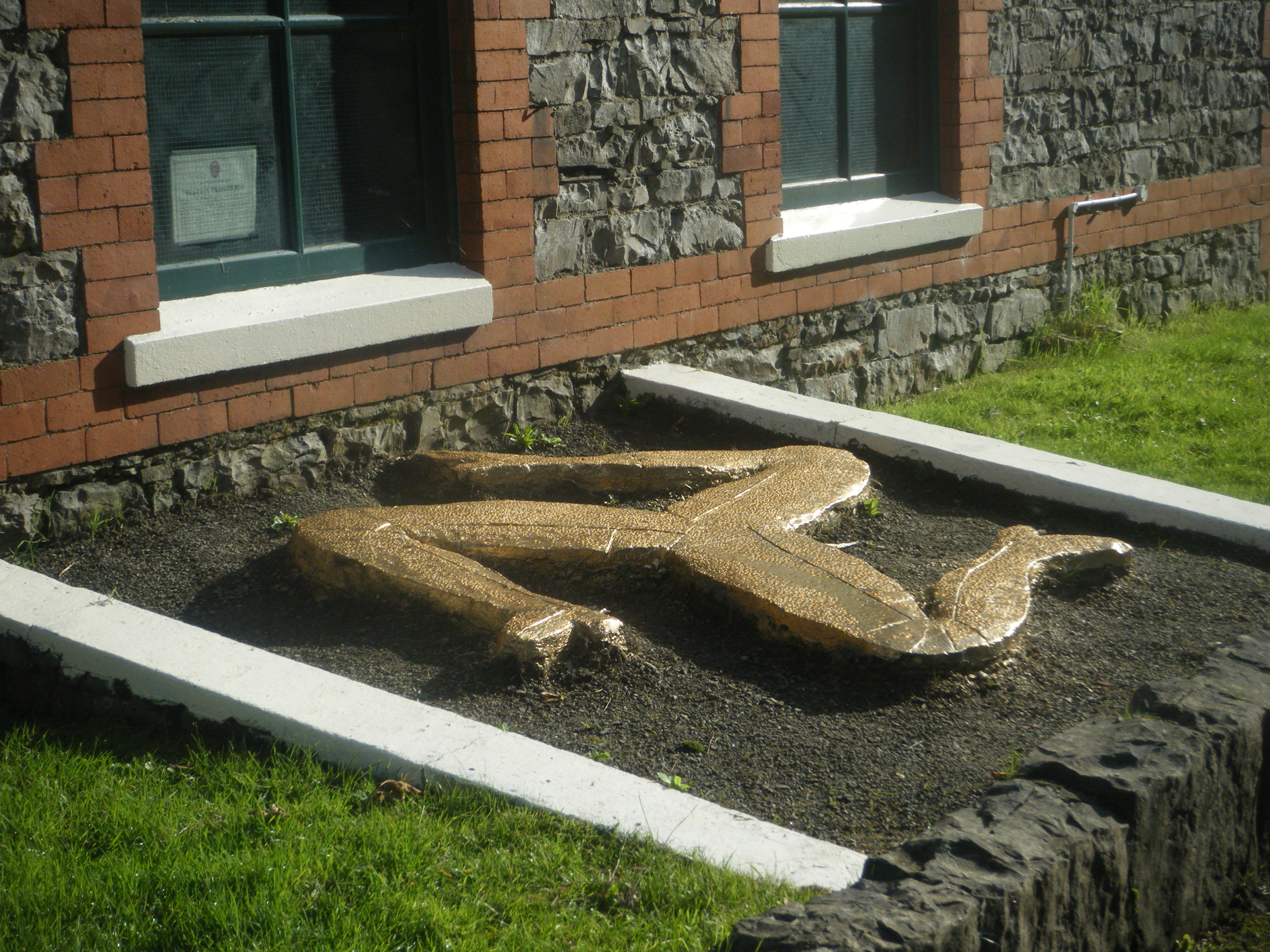
The station's distinctive triskelion during restoration; this was once at Peel Road Station on the Manx Northern Railway

Also at the station, to the side of the goods shed in a gravelled raised section of the lawn is a large cast concrete Triskelion or Legs Of Mann at platform level, painted in a yellow and red colour scheme. It is believed that this piece was relocated from the long-closed stopping place at Peel Road on the Ramsey Line, and was relocated at some point prior to the closure of these other lines in 1968, and prior to 1975 when the Peel Road site was cleared. This feature originally had a gravel surround which was later replaced with grass. In 2012 the Friends Of... group restored the item, repainting it to a golden colour scheme with red gravelled surround to mimic the colourings on the national flag though it returned to its more familiar red, yellow and black setting in the spring of 2016. Originally the feature also had a large circular surround although this was beyond repair to be removed from the original site.

=== Other items ===
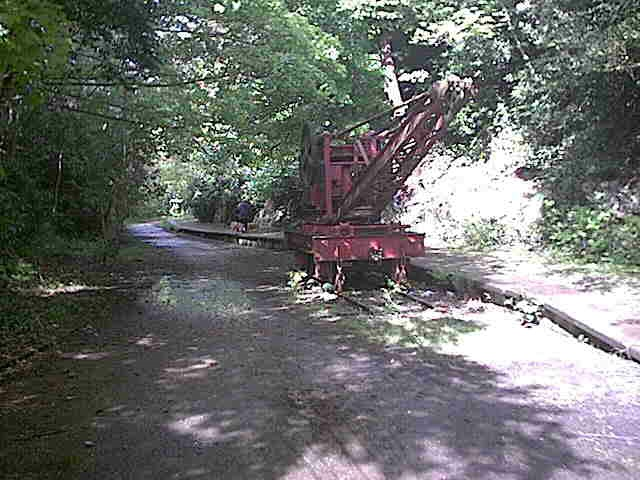
The railway's breakdown No.1 Breakdown Crane, formerly on display at the station, now plinthed on the site of Union Mills Station

On the rear goods siding, one of the railway's three breakdown cranes was stored for a number of years, being removed in 1991 and subsequently restored and placed on display at Union Mills on the site of the former railway station. This crane was constructed in 1893 by the Birmingham-based firm Richard C. Gibbins. Inside the station's waiting room are several framed displays charting various historical aspects of the railway featuring old photographs, framed tickets, maps and other historical documentation relating to the earliest days of the railway. A headboard commemorating the centenary of the adjacent Poulsom Park in 1996 is also mounted on the wall above the fireplace, several other pieces of ephemera are available to view at the station. For many years, there also featured large advertisement hoardings lining the down platform but these were removed in 1974 having become unsafe. An original signal windlass constructed by the Birmingham company A.J. Linley & Co., was also displayed on the up platform for many years, a similar version is extant and used to operate the unique slotted post semaphore signal which protects the station's southerly side.

=== Advertisement hoarding ===
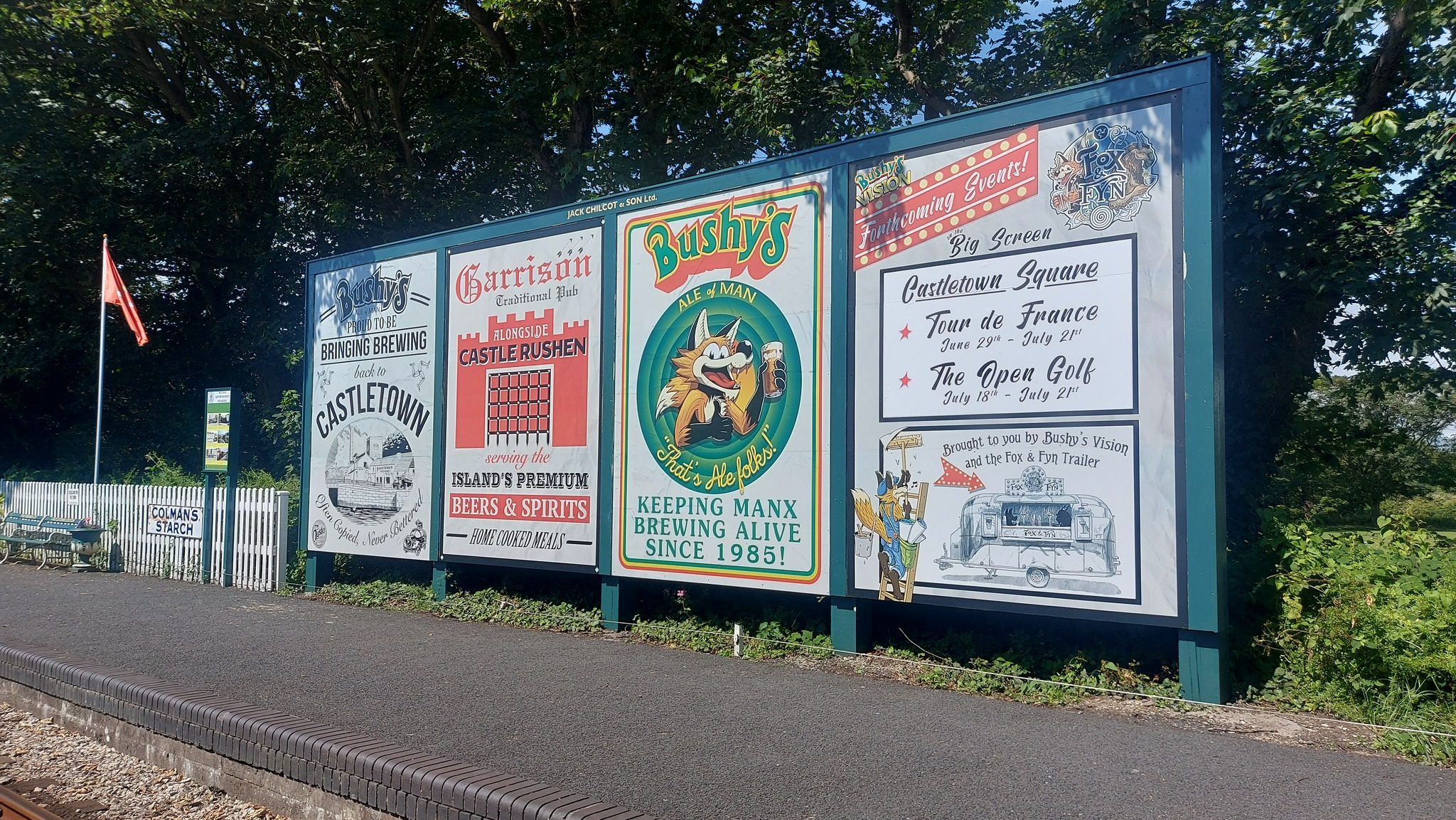
The replica advertisement hoarding at the station shortly after completion of its promotional signage for Bushy's Brewery.

The Friends Of... volunteer group were successful in obtaining planning permission in 2016 to erect a replica advertisement hoarding up the up platform on the site and with fund from Culture Vannin began works shortly thereafter; after a number of setbacks, not least of which the various lockdowns during the COVID-19 pandemic, the large timber baulks were installed in early 2022 and as the season progressed further fundraising was achieved so that the remaining timber could be sourced and delivered to the site; by mid-September work began on erecting the hoarding itself with a view to completion in readiness for the railway's south line 150th anniversary in 2024 and with sponsorship from Bushy's Brewery secured it was completed in time for the plaque unveiling and community event on 2 August, anniversary day itself. The possibility of extending this replica to its original size, approximately doubling its length to that of the original, has been mooted to both complete the historical look and raise revenue for the Friends Of.. group. Following storm damage the hoarding was removed in February 2026, and reinstated the following month in time for the first trains.

=== Cattle dock ===
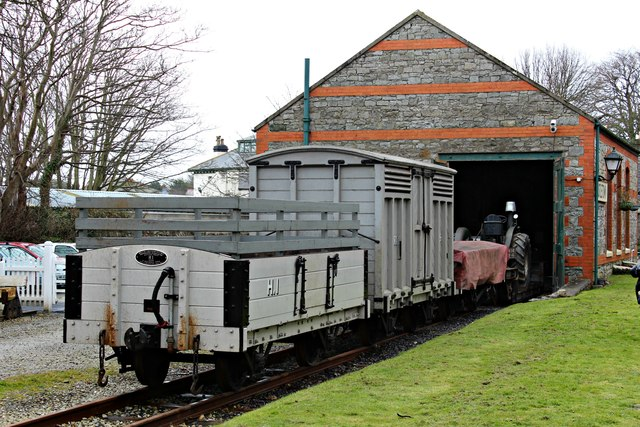
Freight stock

In March 2026 the voluntary Friends Of... group commenced work on another major project, the reinstatement of the long-lost cattle loading pen located on the former goods platform in the station yard. Funding work by contractors from donations and monies raised in previous years, this pen, which takes the form of a palisade fence with three integral access gates, was based upon limited photographic evidence and scale drawings, and completed prior to the first trains of the operating season. It is also fitted with replica enamel signage and an historical interpretive information panel also provided by the group. The dock was supported financially by the Isle of Man Steam Railway Supporters' Association, the leading preservation group on the island, to commemorate their sixtieth anniversary.

=== Period signage ===
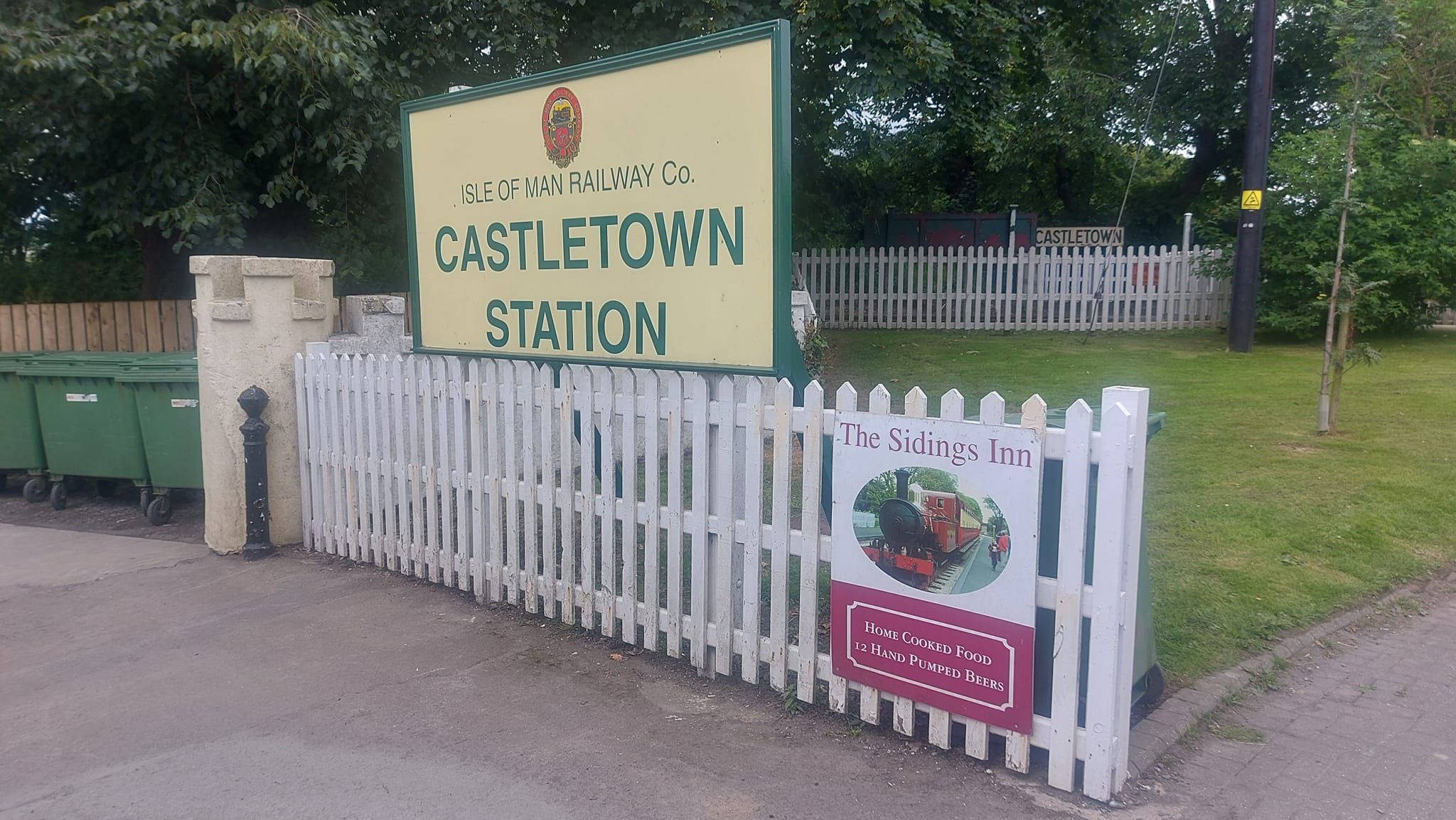
The forecourt signage at the entrance to the site featuring the Railway Company crest with historically recreated lettering.

The station is notable along the route of the south line of the remaining railway for a number of period signage boards and advertisements maintaining a period feel lacking at other sites on the route; all of the signs are provided by the Friends Of... volunteer group who have sourced them over a period of years, and also maintain and upkeep them using funds donated from events on the site which are staged regularly in the railway season. Signage is all presented in a heritage style featuring the green and cream scheme of the site and in a way to be unobtrusive, modern access signage being presented in a "heritage" style to keep the environs of the station.

== Poulsom Park ==
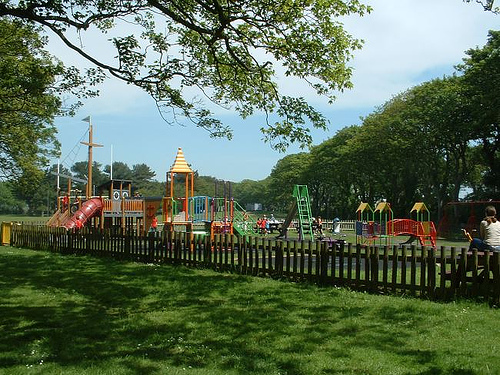
The children's play area in Poulsom Park, the station lies above this play area, secreted by the large trees to the rear right of this view; the park also has rugby fields, a skatepark, zip-line and pathways

To the northeasterly side of the station lies this park, provided and funded by a generous benefactor to the town and being established at around the same time as the railway and it is from this benefactor that the park takes its name; it consists of a large grassed area and is surrounded by perimeter railings within which are contained playground equipment for children and two football/rugby pitches which form the home grounds and changing rooms for the local clubs. The play equipment has been greatly improved in recent times, the standard slide and swings being replaced by a pirate ship-themed set of equipment. The park is accessed either from a wide path that passes underneath the railway at the south-western end, or via a set of steps accessed from the station platform. More recently the area has become home to a skateboard park which is viewable from the passing trains; this facility is popular with local children who use the facilities for both skate boarding and stunt bike racing. Such is the popularity of the park with travellers that it can be accessed directly from the line's northbound platform; the area is a popular site for campers in the summer months as well as being home to the local football and rugby teams who regularly play matches there. The brick-built changing rooms and club house facilities for the rugby team are located at the northern end of the park, close the skatepark. A macadam pathway around the perimeter of the play park, and sporting fields is a popular with walkers and a regular Walk & Talk event takes place here. In more recent times the park has been plagued by vandalism which has resulted in the installation of closed circuit television cameras to monitor and apprehend culprits.

== Filming ==
=== The Ginger Tree ===
As part of a major adaptation of the Oswald Wynd novel in 1988 the station was used to film exterior scenes, together with several other locations on the line, which doubled for Russia during the revolution. The recessed canopy was dressed with luggage and artificial snow for numerous linking scenes, and locomotive No. 11 Maitland was memorably repainted into a matt black colour scheme as part of the filming, a scheme it retained for the remainder of that season. Much of the location work was filmed during the hours of darkness and the scenes shot at the station do not feature a train although one was present. At the present time the series has not been repeated nor is it available in any home media format. The production was made by the BBC.

=== Thomas and The Magic Railroad ===
The live-action film version of Thomas The Tank Engine was partially filmed at the station, forming the basis of Shining Time Station (itself a variation of the series screened in the U.S.) in the story and the building and its environs were considerably disguised for this purpose, with a temporary canopy being built in the place where the original had once stood; whilst being a temporary structure this canopy looked remarkably similar to the original which had been demolished some seven years previously. The distinctive limestone station building was completely encased in wooden cladding and finished in a brown and cream colour scheme for the duration. Between the filming the production company provided their own style station nameboards which were erected between shots for the convenience of passengers, the railway remaining operational throughout the period of filming. The goods shed was disguised as the local Cooperative Store and period cars and set dressings were featured in the station. Some of the scenes shot featuring Alec Baldwin (the 1st station master), Michael E. Rodgers (the 2nd station master) and Peter Fonda (the grandfather) were shot at this location. The railway was used extensively during filming, with Port St. Mary goods shed being transformed into a workshop for the purpose and other island locations were also used including the Tynwald Hill Inn at St. John's. The locomotives and carriages were however not featured in the finished motion picture.

=== Five Children and It ===
The station was again used for filming in 2005 when a live-action version of the Edith Nesbit story was filmed on the island, particularly in and around the town. For this, a temporary canopy was reinstated along the frontage of the station in a similar position to the original, and this remained in place through the majority of the peak season. the canopy was fitted with replica decorate fascia boards to match in with the extant versions. The film starred local resident Sir Norman Wisdom and the creature was voiced by Eddie Izzard. Scenes at the station retained the name of Castletown which are clearly discernable in the finished film. Upon completion of filming a number of smaller period props were retained at the station.

=== James May's Toy Stories ===
During June 2014 an episode of this series was filmed on the island as part of the T.T. races when a motorcycle constructed entirely of Meccano was driven around the famous mountain circuit. As part of the filming Oz Clarke took a footplate ride on locomotive No. 10 G.H. Wood alighting at the station where linking footage of the train and its crew was filmed.

=== Great Coastal Railway Journeys ===
In September 2021 a film crew visited the railway with former politician Michael Portillo to film and episode of the upcoming series on coastal railway journeys and briefly alighted at the station which was featured in the episode; filming also took place at Douglas, Port St. Mary and Port Erin while the episode also featured the electric railway at Groudle Glen and a number of other heritage locations on the island as well as a visit to Tynwald Court.

== Timetabling ==
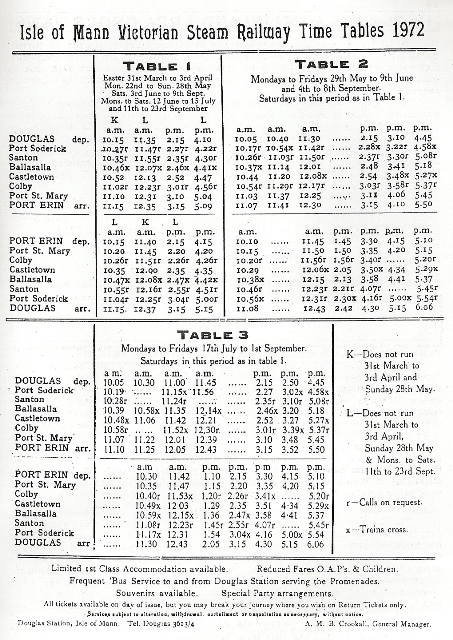
The 1972 timetable when the line was marketed as the Isle of Mann Victorian Steam Railway by the Marquess of Ailsa, then operator, showing three variants on the timetable of which only the third saw trains crossing at Castletown as denoted by the "X" beside the times; the station was however still staffed throughout.

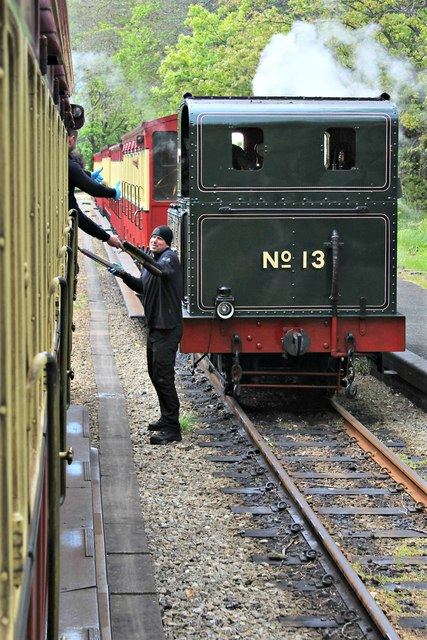
The traditional exchanging of single line staffs is still observed at the station, here the driver of No.13 Kissack swaps staffs with the other (southbound) train. The railway continues to operate the traditional Staff & Ticket system which has been in place since the line's earliest days of service.

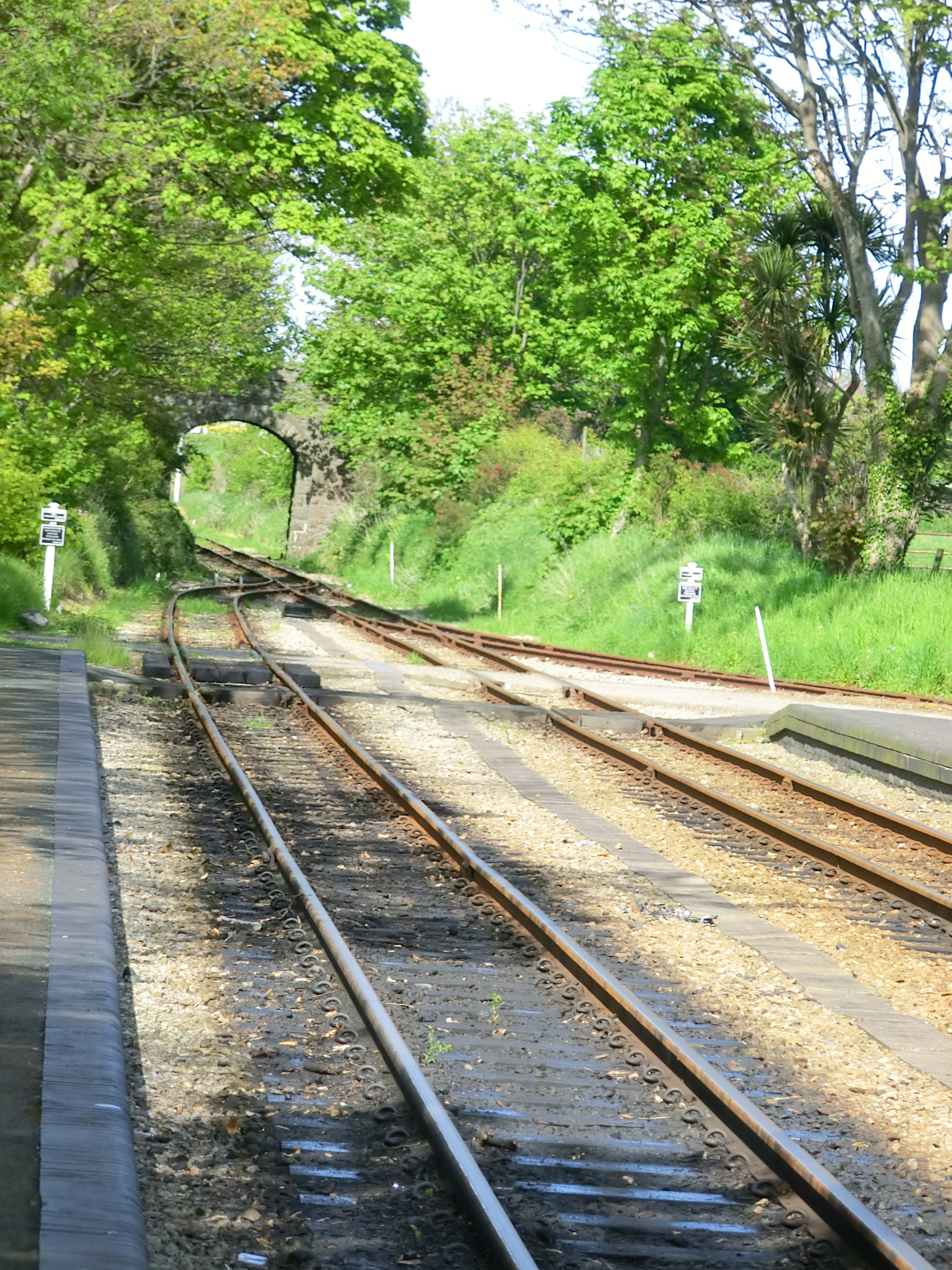
Showing the long passing loop at the station with Love Lane Bridge at the north-western extremity of the yard; the loop is capable of carrying two twelve-carriage trains and on its southern side has a spur serving the former goods yard; points are sprung in favour of left-hand running, common practice at remaining open stations.

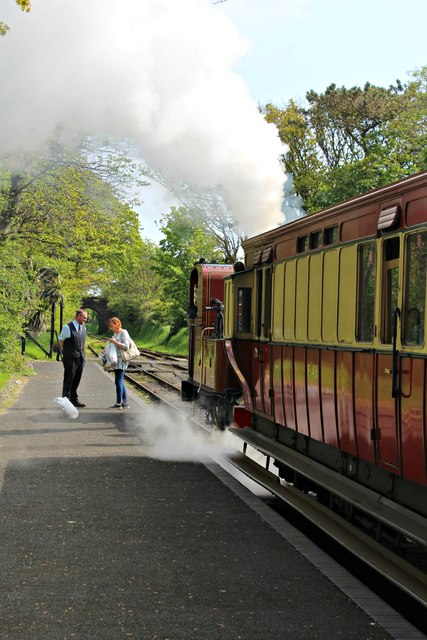
Northbound train headed by No.8 Fenella awaiting the arrival of the other service in a common scene at the station as the stationmaster engages with a passenger. The line towards Douglas Station stretches out into the distance

=== 1874–1965 ===
Since the establishment of the line in 1874 the station has been one of the key passing places for trains; timetable issues were usually released four times a year to coincide with seasonal traffic, with notably reduced winter services from the early 1960s when the railway-owned Road Services buses shouldered some services. From November 1965 the railway announced its closure for "essential track maintenance" but no services operated in 1966 at all and the station closed.

=== 1967–1974 ===
With the reopening of the line by the Marquis of Ailsa in June 1967, the station reopened, but later than the remainder of the network; owing to gas mains being laid beneath the track further south it served as the temporary terminus in 1967 with the full line reinstated in 1968, when it again resumed use as an occasional passing place. The station was also used for the delivery and dispatch of the short lived Mantainor scheme during this period. The Marquis took his five-year option at the close of the 1971 season and the Railway Company resumed operation, marking the centenary in 1974.

=== 1975–1977 ===
In 1975 the railway only operated between Castletown and Port Erin so it acted as a temporary terminus; this was as a cost cutting experiment but was deemed to be failure not serving the capital. The following year saw services extended to Ballasalla which again proved unsuccessful, so in 1977 the full line reopened (with government subsidy from the then Tourist Board), again seeing Castletown again regularly used as a passing place.

=== 1978–1999 ===
The railway was nationalised in 1978 and from May that year began to be operated by the Manx Electric Railway Board, later becoming the Isle of Man Passenger Transport Board which also had responsibility for the bus services. The station continued to be staffed and used to cross trains on a daily basis in season. It was not until 1987 that a Saturday service was operated however.

=== 2000–2002 ===
During major track work between 2000 and 2002 it again served as a temporary terminus. With work being carried out southwest of the station in 1967 it again acted as temporary terminus, and no trains operated in 1966 following cessation of Railway Company operations. Prior to this it was open throughout the year, though latterly the winter services were limited and occasionally substituted with bus services. Being a main hub on the south line the station remained open throughout the year though other smaller rural halts were not always kept open away from the peak season. A number of staff members were full time to deal with bookings, parcels, livestock, passing of trains and miscellaneous duties. It was common for the railway to issue a number of printed timetables throughout the year, with a short winter service, early spring, peak season, late season and autumn schedules prevailing. Provided with a long passing loop capable of holding twelve bogie vehicles on each side the station saw regular use for passing of trains as well as marshalling of goods stock in the two sidings, one of which remains connected to the goods shed, while the other was temporarily lifted in 2020 to allow for drainage work.

=== 2003–2008 ===
With the completion of drainage works and infrastructure replacement the full line reopened with due ceremony in May 2003 and the station again became one of two regular passing places; services reverted to their common seasonal pattern between Easter and October to a regular standard timetable of four trains in each direction between the selected dates, the second returns of the day passing at Castletown and the remainder at Ballasalla.

=== 2009–2014 ===
In 2009 a new letter-coded timetable has been in place which saw trains passing at Ballasalla daily throughout the season with generally runs between the start of March and end of October annually, this being designated "R" (pink) in schedules with a more intensive "S" (blue) timetable and other variations subject to demand and events.

=== 2015–2019 ===
Since 2015 Castletown has been used for the passing of all timetabled services following the closure and un-staffing of Ballasalla Station with services every two hours on the standard schedule at XX:27, increasing to every hour and a half on peak days with additional trains. At this time Port St. Mary Station was also closed and became unstaffed.

=== 2020–2021 ===
In 2020 the season commenced as scheduled but in the second week of operations the island was placed on lockdown owing to the COVID-19 pandemic and services did not resume until July, albeit to a curtailed timetable, continuing until early November. In 2021 services did operate for the same reason, a shortened season beginning in July and continuing until the traditional end of October. The station however did remain periodically open during the closure periods for the sale and top-up of bus travel cards, observing all social distancing measures accordingly.

=== 2022–present ===
Following the coronavirus disruptions all services have reverted to their 2019 timings and trains have commenced in the middle of March, continuing until early November, though in shoulder season it is usual for there to be no services on Tuesdays and Wednesdays in March, April, early May and October/November. In both 2023 and 2024 special timetables were operated on key dates to tie in with the one hundred and fiftieth anniversary events, the latter notably seeing Ballasalla Station reopened for just one day. The 2026 season concluded on 1 November and services are scheduled to restart on 18 March 2027.

== Events ==
=== The Royal Train (1972) ===
On 2 August 1972 members of the Royal Family boarded a special train at the station accompanied by dignitaries and officers of the Railway Company; accompanying Her Majesty The Queen and Prince Philip were three of their children, Princess Anne, Prince Andrew and Prince Edward as well as Lord Mountbatten. They were introduced to key members of staff by lieutenant governor Peter Stallard, including the chairman William Lambden, chief engineer Donald Shaw and the locomotive crew and train staff. The train was hauled by No.13 Kissack and the party travelled in Royal Saloon F.36 (now on display in the Isle of Man Railway Museum in Port Erin) into Douglas Station, passing No.4 Loch where it was acting as standby locomotive. This represented only the second time the railway had conveyed royalty, the first being the Queen Mother who travelled on the Peel Line in 1963 using the same carriage by hauled by No.11 Maitland. On arrival in the capital Her Majesty also travelled on the Douglas Bay Horse Tramway riding tramcar No.44 which thereafter became known as the Royal Tram, painted in a patriotic red, white and blue scheme for the occasion.

=== Island at War (2010–2019) ===
Beginning in 2010 the station has taken part in an annual event, usually held on the third weekend of August, as part of a wartime recreation weekend staged by the railway. The station building and goods shed are dressed with period posters and memorabilia, with all traces of modern signage and additions being removed or concealed for the duration of the event. Anti-shatter tape is applied to the windows and historical recreation groups attend the site adding to the period atmosphere; themed music is played on the station's public address system and various music groups also attend throughout the weekend entertaining around the station site. At previous events there have also been stagings of un-exploded bombs, sandbag bunkers, field hospitals and other period dioramas. This weekend is one of the busiest of each season and attracts both locals and visitors. Local groups of scouts also attend the site, camping on the concourse and providing period foodstuffs such as rabbit stew to passengers. Similar events are staged of several other stations along the line during this event, notably at either termini at Douglas and Port Erin . In recent times similar themed events have also taken place at Cregneash Folk Museum operated by Manx National Heritage for which a shuttle bus service has been operated from Port St. Mary.

=== As Tinseltown (2010–2013) ===
In December 2010 the station was renamed for the first time as Tinseltown; this was carried out when it was used as the terminus for the railway's popular annual Santa Trains for the first time; these seasonal services had previously been terminated at Santon Station for many years. As part of a new initiative operated by Manx National Heritage, the local authority Castletown Commissioners and the railway the revamped services saw trains bring passengers to the station on an hourly basis for a short shuttle bus ride to Castle Rushen where Santa's Grotto was located in addition to traditional market stalls, fairground rides, an enchanted forest walk and snow machine. For these services the station was decorated with festive lights and music played, and adding to the festive feel of the station several of the services took place following an unusually heavy snowfall that blanketed the island in December 2010. As part of the experience the unusual step of allowing buses into the relatively small station car park was permitted and the Tinseltown Shuttle departed at regular intervals, echoing the latter years of Railway Company operation when Road Services buses called at the station at regular intervals when the rail-based services were restricted during the winter months. This theme and use of the station as a terminus was repeated in 2011 and 2012; in 2013 the grotto was based in the station's office; the decision was taken to revert festive services to Santon Station in 2014. In more recent times it has become the regular stopping place for festive dining trains which operate regularly throughout each December for which the station is decorated.

=== Commonwealth Youth Games (2011) ===
On Monday, 12 September 2011, the station played host to the official parties connected with the 2011 Commonwealth Youth Games with the "culture day" prior to the closing ceremony of the event taking place in the town; to accommodate the vast numbers travelling on this occasion passenger services on the railway were suspended for the day whilst the competitors and officials were transported by rail to the station. The event has been a fixture of the sporting calendar taking place every four years since the inaugural event which took place in Edinburgh in the year 2000 and the 2011 event was the first time that the island has hosted the event. The event is designed as a small-scale version of the Commonwealth Games aimed at children and young people; past hosts have included Bendigo in Australia and Pune in India. The event saw the railway coping with its largest crowd on a single day for what may possibly be the first time since the annual influx of passengers on Tynwald Day ceased to be a major part in the railway's calendar after the Peel Line closed in 1968 when the railway stopped serving the village of St. John's where the outdoor ceremony is still held on 5 July each year. For the 2011 event, every serviceable steam locomotive on the railway was used (No. 4 Loch, No. 10 G.H. Wood, No. 12 Hutchinson and No. 13 Kissack all seeing service) together with all available coaches, which totalled 18 bogie carriages – the first time this number of coaches had been available since 1974 – including three newly refurbished coaches all of which are over one hundred years old. Once competitors arrived at the station they were transferred to the town square by four Wright Eclipse Gemini buses provided by the island's nationalised Bus Vannin arm of the transport division. All competitors attended specially prepared events at Castle Rushen before returning to the capital by rail.

=== For Southern 100 ceremony (2015) ===
With ongoing regeneration works in the town's historic market square at the time of the event, the organisers of the Southern 100 motorcycle races held the closing ceremony and prize presentation for the 2015 outside the station; the road was cordoned off from Victoria Road to the station forecourt and a temporary dais installed on the approach lawn to the station to allow the event to take place. Several hundred people attended the event, which may become an annual sight at the station, and the Friends Of group provided refreshments. As part of the 2015 event the races marked their diamond jubilee resulting in record crowds attending the ceremony, at which Guy Martin was hailed as the overall winner, being a long-time supporter of the event, which is known widely as the "friendly races". Since this time the area immediately outside the station (known as "the triangle" between the two hostelries The Sidings and The Viking) has been used for a number of open-air events in conjunction with local events, notably a music venue in the summer of 2021.

=== Christmas Terminus (2013-present) ===
Each December since 2013 the railway's dining train has operated regularly with a range of festive meal options and the majority of these services use the station as a terminus for both daytime and evening trains; the station is fitted with colourful festoon lighting and decorations are provided by the Friends Of... volunteer group each December and into January when it is common for afternoon tea, brunch and commuter services to call prior to the closure for maintenance.

=== Renamed Ballavolley Halt (2015) ===
During the 2015 Manx Heritage Transport Festival some of the stations along the route of the extant Port Erin Line were renamed as former stations of the Manx Northern Railway with Castletown being designated as Wild Life Park on 1 August 2015 only. The station's running in boards were covered with plastic signs denoting this, with selected other useful signage for passengers being removed for the duration of the event. One locomotive, No. 10 G.H. Wood was also temporarily renamed to appear as No. 5 Mona during the day, with other stations taking on dual roles, Port Erin becoming Ramsey and Douglas becoming St. John's; the request stops at both The Level and Ronaldsway Halt were not renamed, with bin liners covering the running in boards at these sites. The original halt at Ballavolley opened during the summer of 1965 upon the establishment of the Wild Life Park, consisting of a simple running in board and ground level grassed platform. It was again used during the brief reopening of the Ramsey Line 1967, taking its name from the nearby level crossing (the gatehouse of which remains extant today), being named "Ballavolley Halt – For Wild Life Park" rather than the "Wildlife Park" title used during the reenactment.

=== During COVID pandemic (2020–2021) ===
Despite the railway closing during lockdown in March 2020, the station remained open as a selling point for Bus Vannin "Go card" top-ups and retail requirements; following a relaxation of restrictions the railway itself reopened in July 2020 and remained operational five days a week until the close of the season as scheduled on 1 November, whereafter the station again closed for the winter, being used a destination for various festive dining services throughout December. A second island lockdown took effect on 7 January 2021 and the following day the station's ticket office was once again reopened for Bus Vannin sales, the railway itself remaining closed during this period; the lockdown was lifted on 19 April and the station closed until the season commenced on 27 May. A limited timetable operated for the first few weeks of the season.

=== 150th anniversary (2024) ===
Celebrated at the end of July and beginning of August 2024 to coincide with the actual anniversary date of 2 August, the volunteer Friends Of... group commissioned a blue heritage plaque with support and funding from Castletown Heritage for erection on the building at a ceremony on the anniversary date; the structure is the sole surviving example from the line's inception, with a timber example remaining at Santon Station dating from 1875. Commemorations took place as part of the larger Manx Heritage Transport Festival focussing on locomotives No.4 Loch and No.5 Mona, both built for the opening of the line, the latter being cosmetically restored by the Isle of Man Steam Railway Supporters' Association for the 2023 celebrations and displayed on the site for the day together with the Foxdale Coach and No.24 Betsy and No.25 Sprout. The plaque was unveiled by former Chief Minister and president of the Friends Of... group. Tony Brown in the presence of the Lieutenant Governor of the Isle of Man Sir John Lorimer

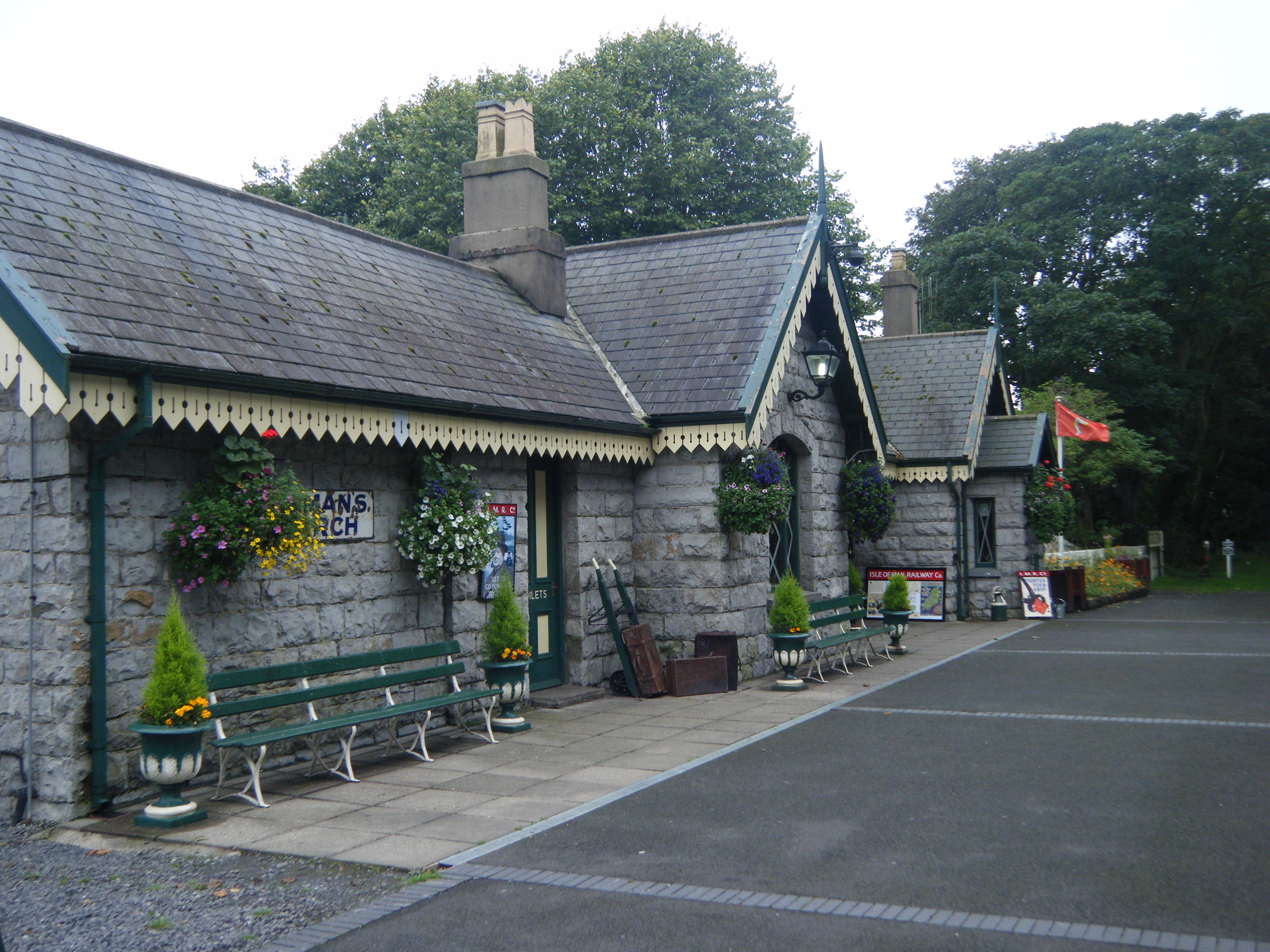
During one of the popular Island at War weekend events in August 2012, for which all traces of modernity are hidden or removed for atmosphere

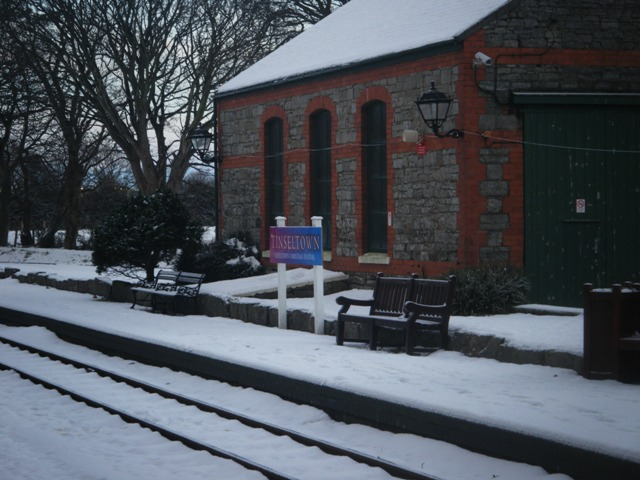
The station and its large goods shed after overnight snowfall, dressed as Tinseltown for the annual festive services in December 2012

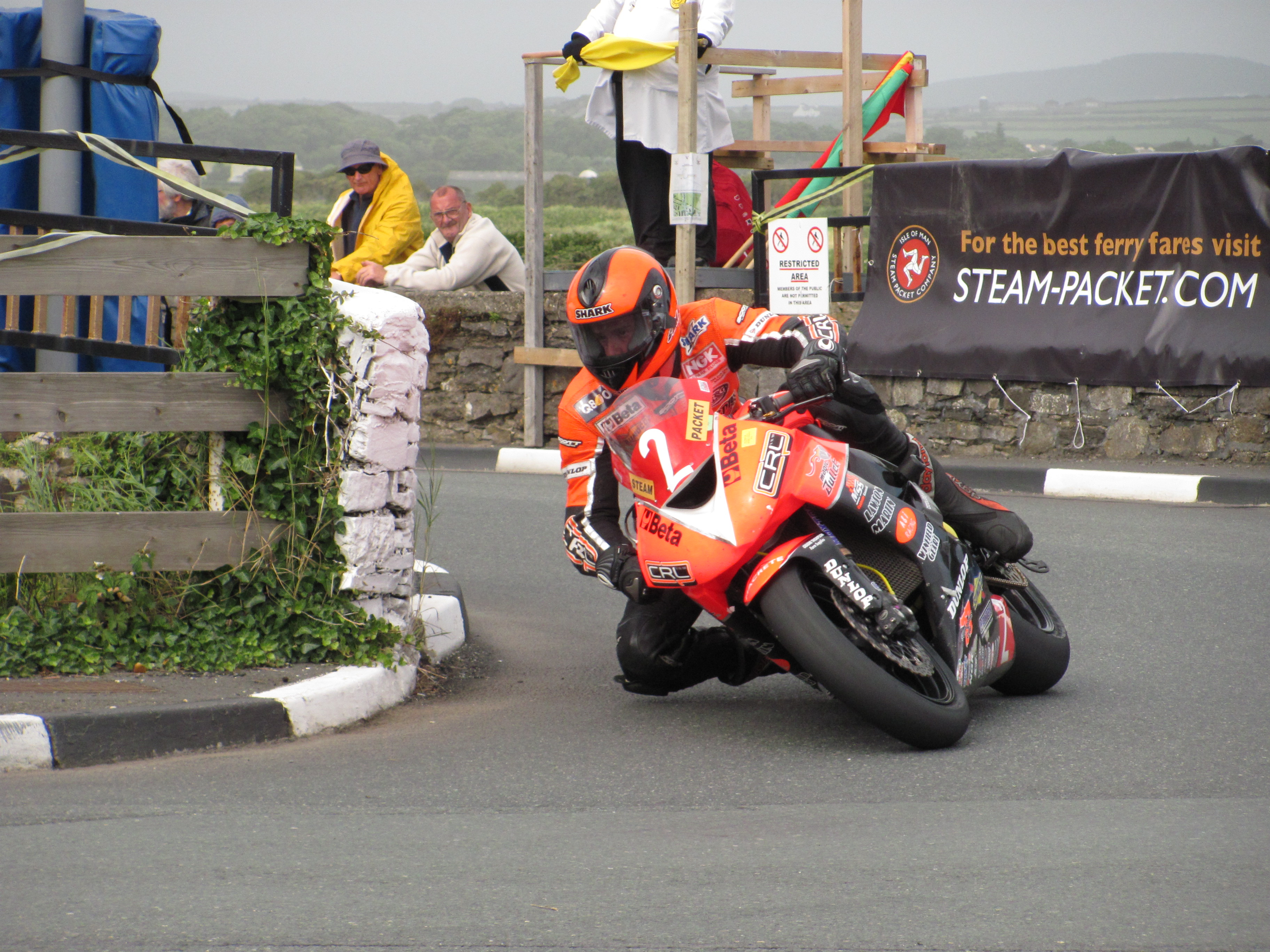
Southern "100" racing which takes place annually on the nearby Billown Circuit at Malew Road bridge under which the line passes

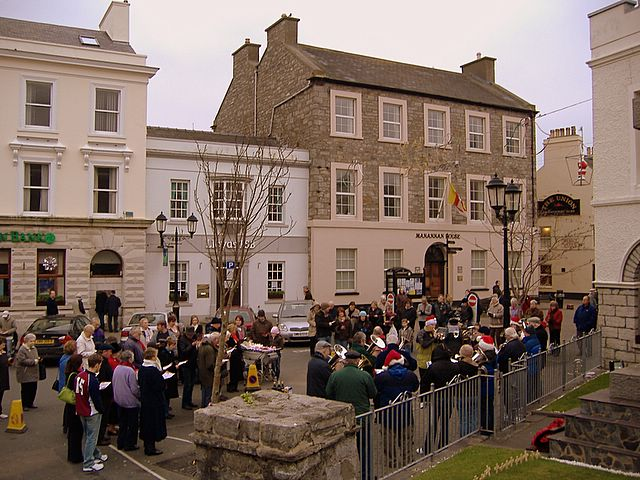
The historic Market Square, which is a short walk from the station, with traditional Christmas carol singers in attendance

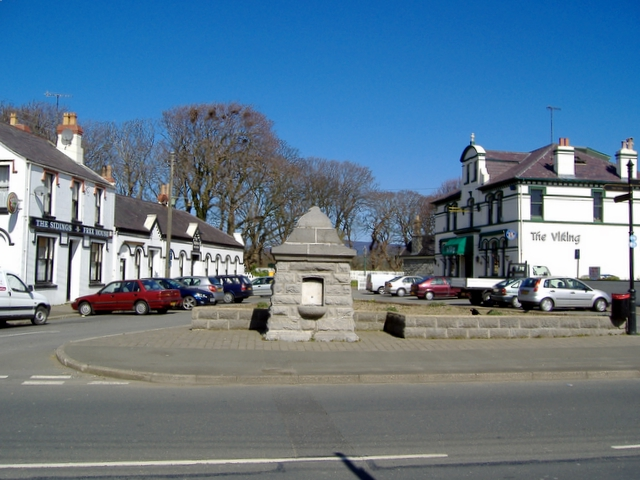
Outside the entrance on Victoria Road is the area known as "The Triangle" between The Sidings and The Viking free houses

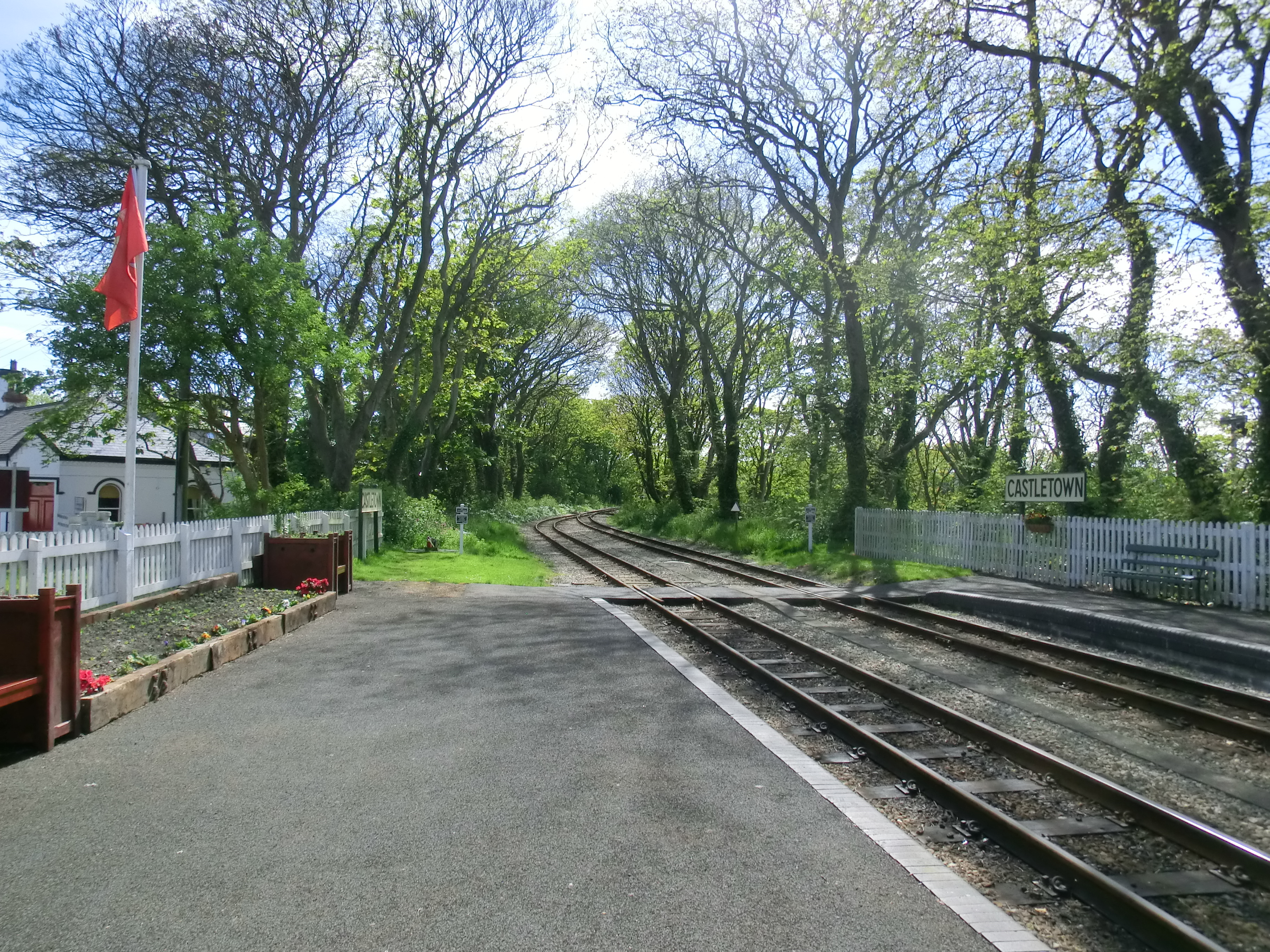
A quiet time between trains looking southwest from the down platform in April 2011 showing the Friends Of... flower bed and flagstaff

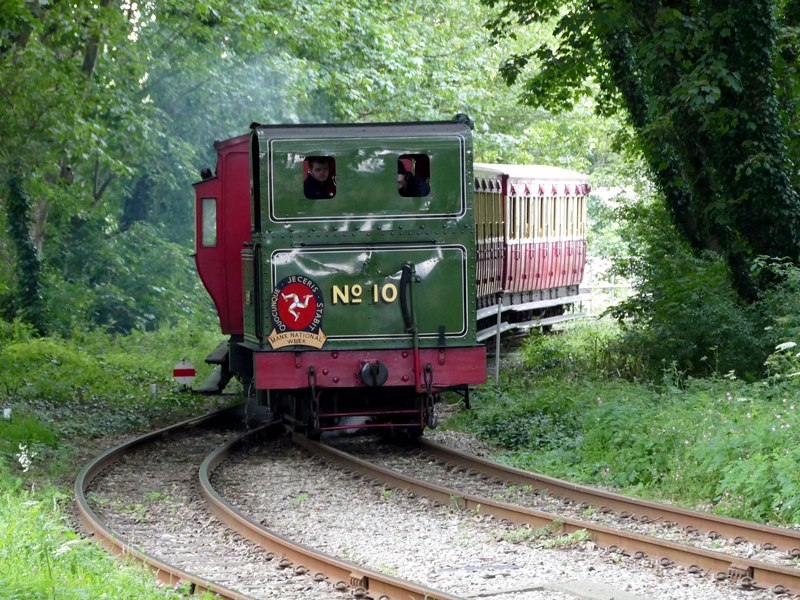
No.10 G.H. Wood at the station in July 2013 wearing the spring green colour scheme with a Manx National Week banner

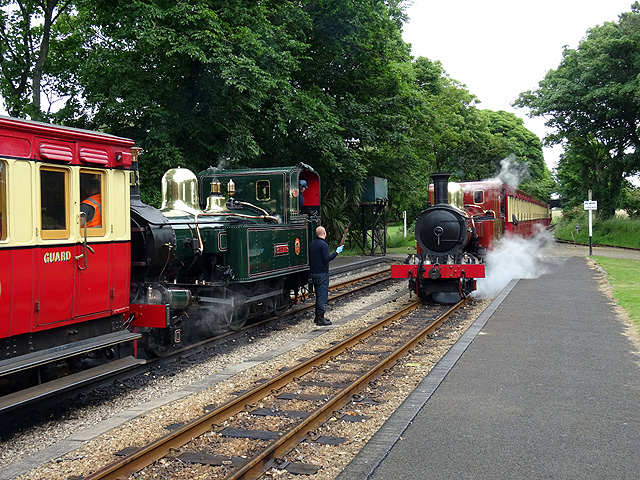
The familiar sight of trains passing with No.12 Hutchinson and No.13 Kissack in July 2016; all scheduled services now pass here

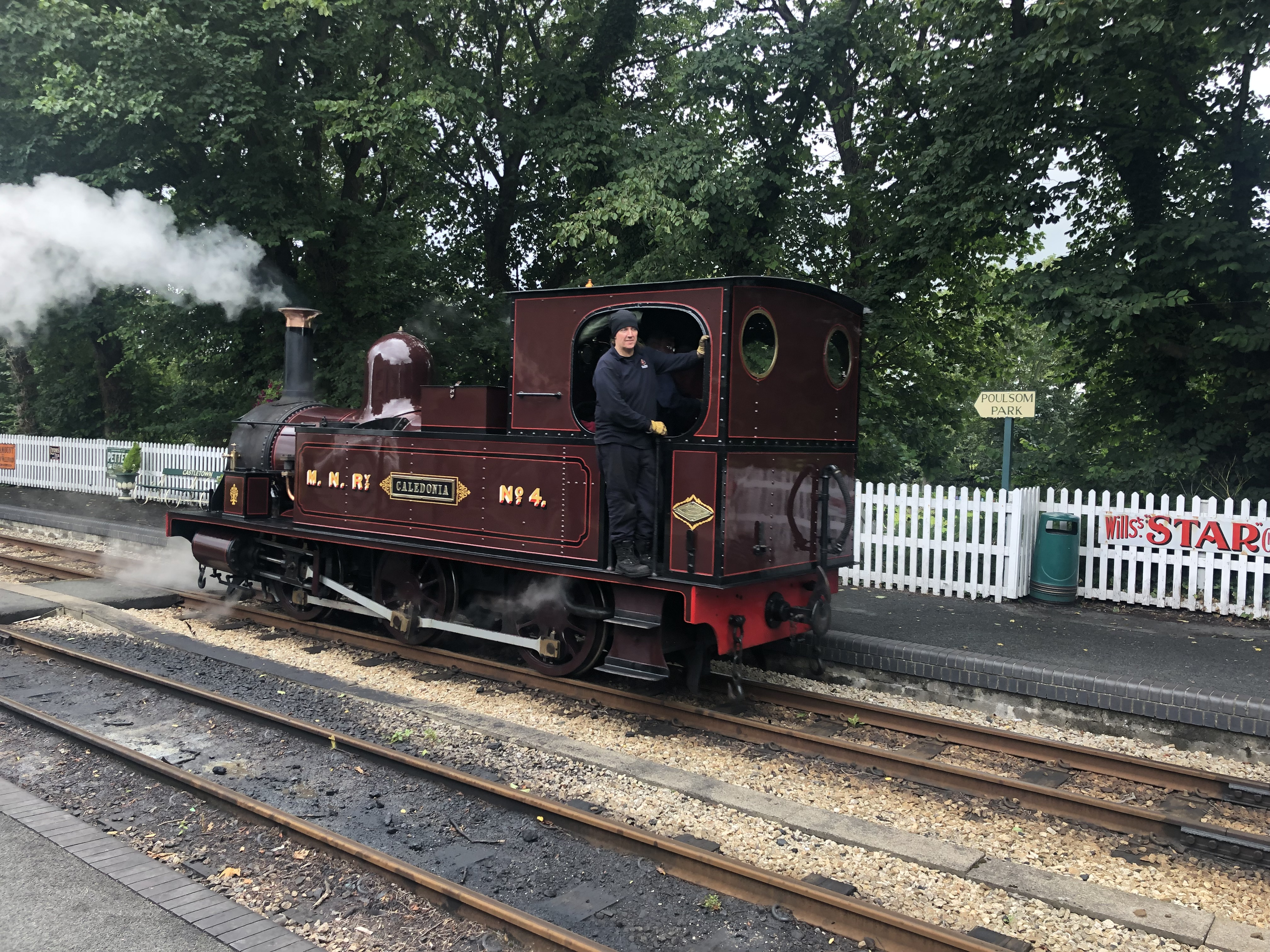
M.N.Ry. No.4 Caledonia running round her train at the station with one of the popular Ultimate Driving Experience trains in July 2019

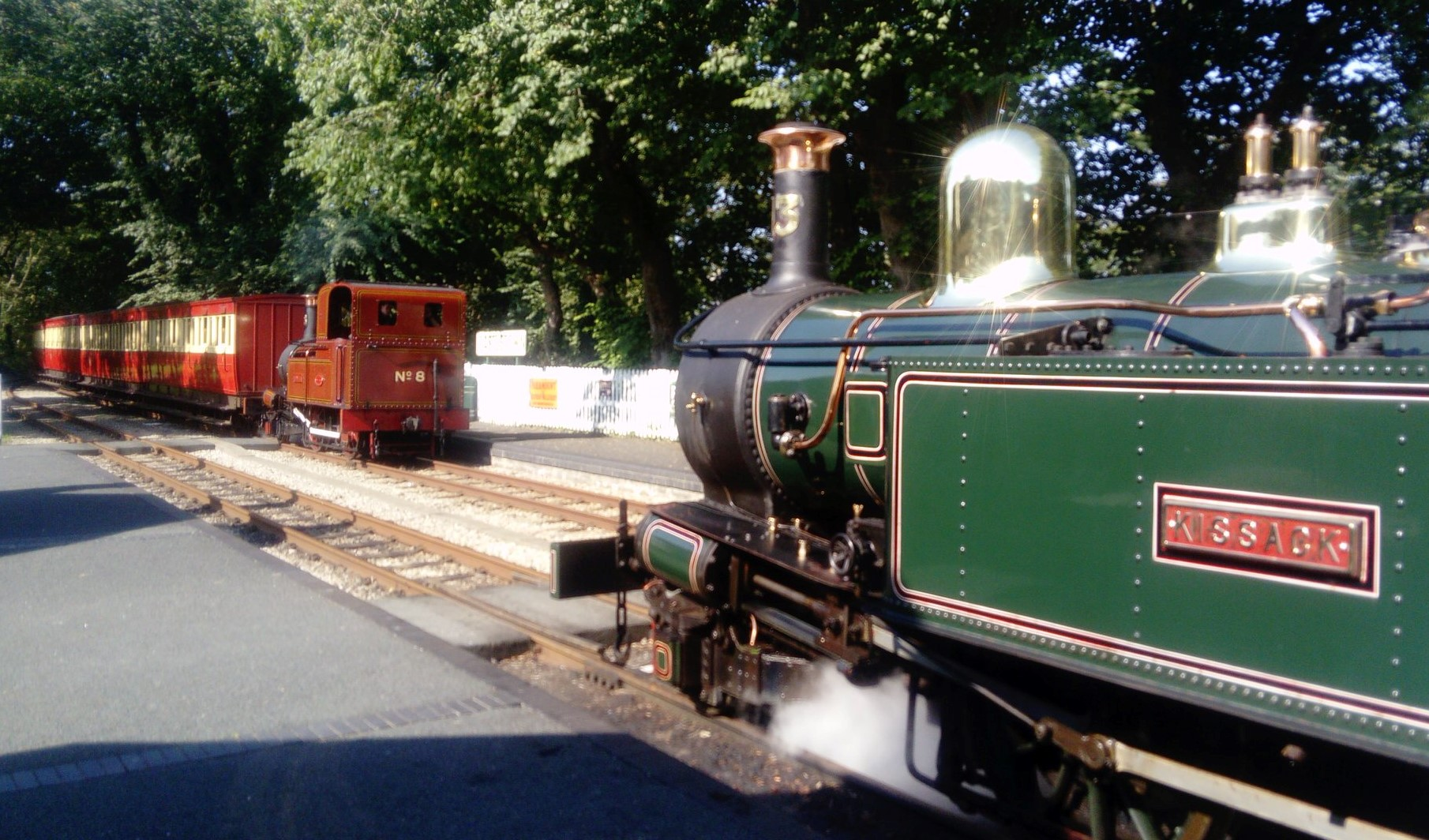
No.4 Loch passing No.13 Kissack during the shortened 2021 season owing to COVID-19 restrictions on the island when a limited service was operated.

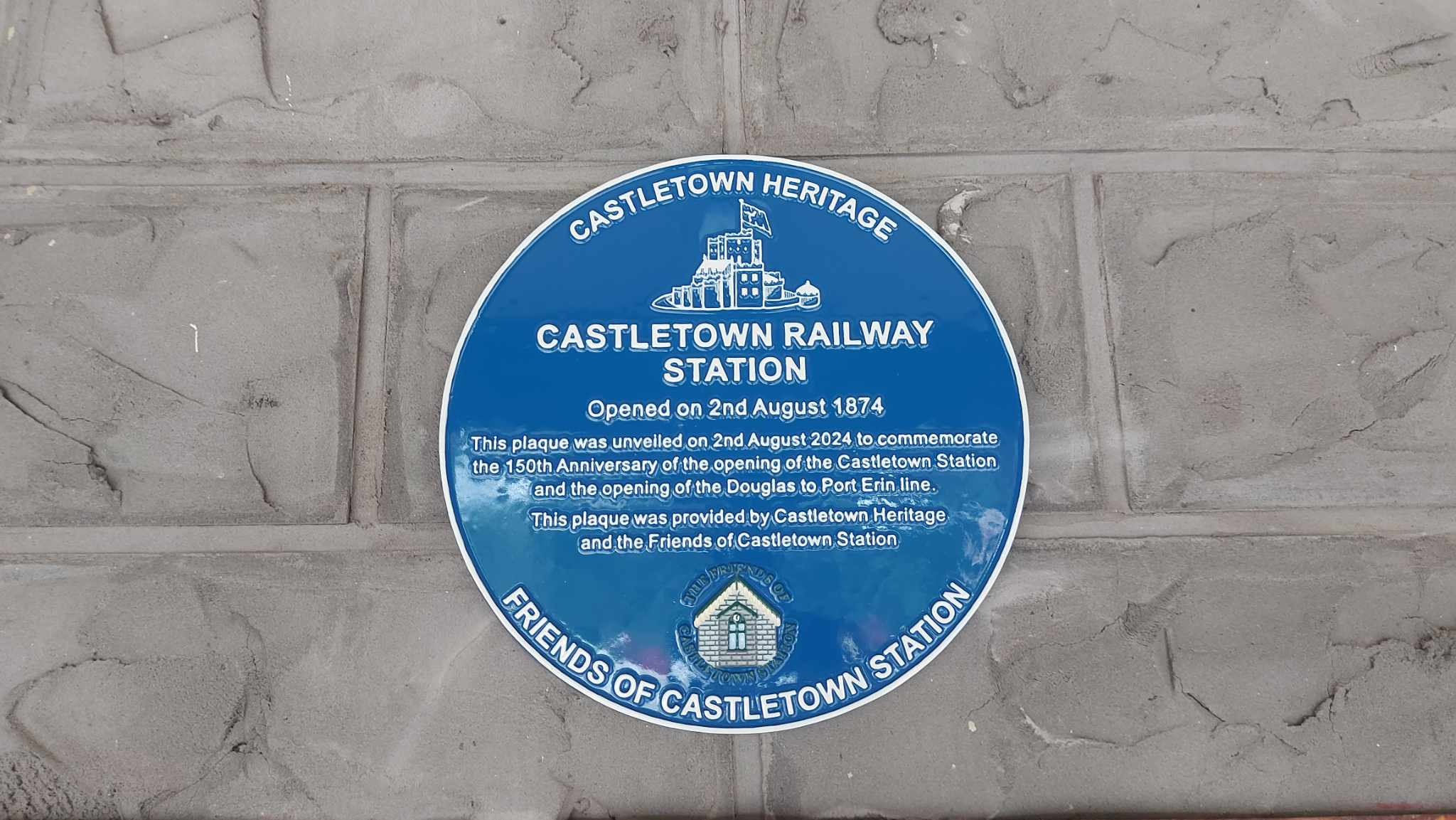
The commemorative blue plaque provided by Castletown Heritage marking the 150th anniversary unveiled by former Chief Minister Tony Brown on 2 August 2024.

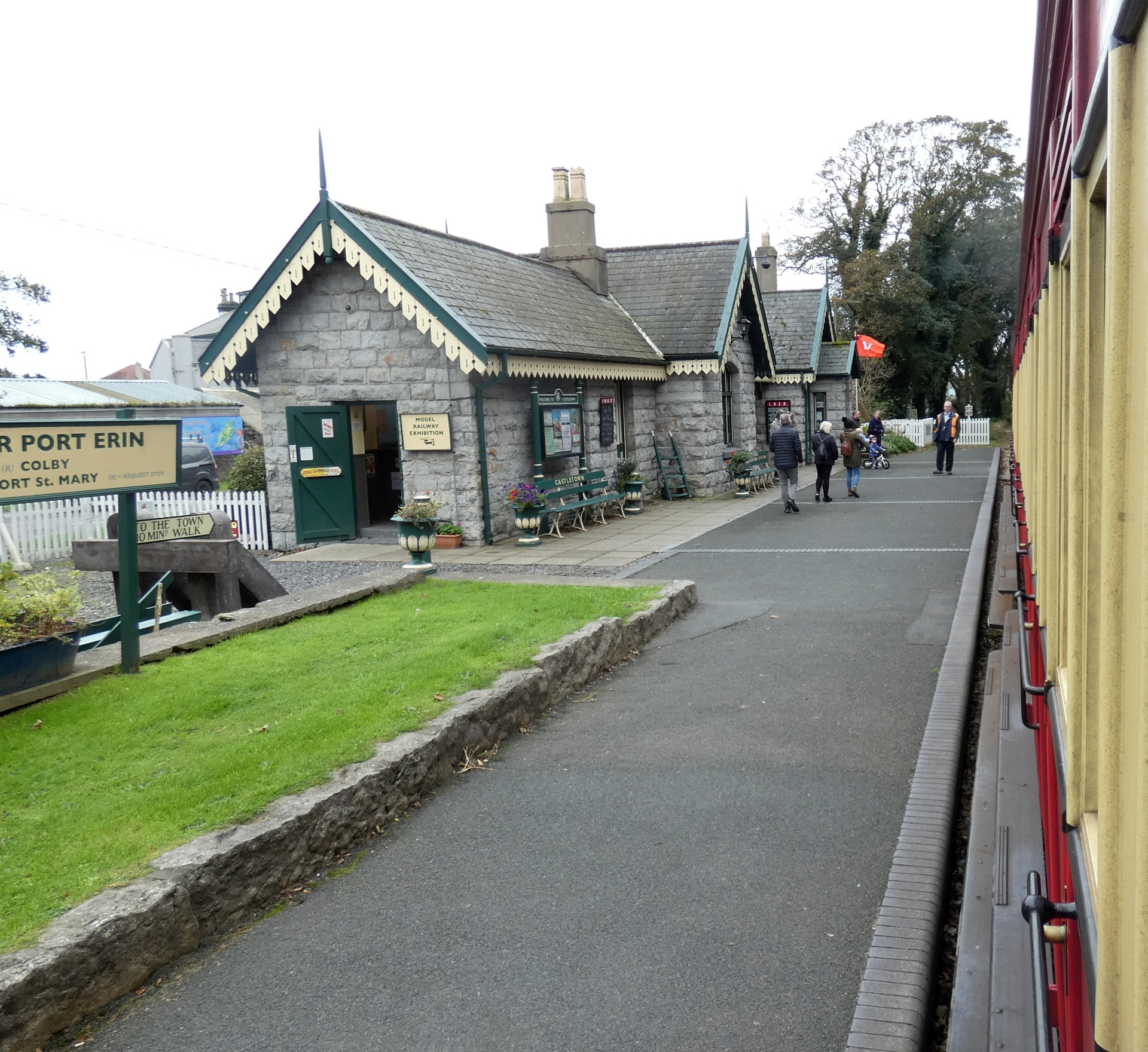
The view from a southbound train showing the platform and former stores/urinal which now houses a model railway layout provided by the Friends Of... volunteer group

== School Hill Station ==
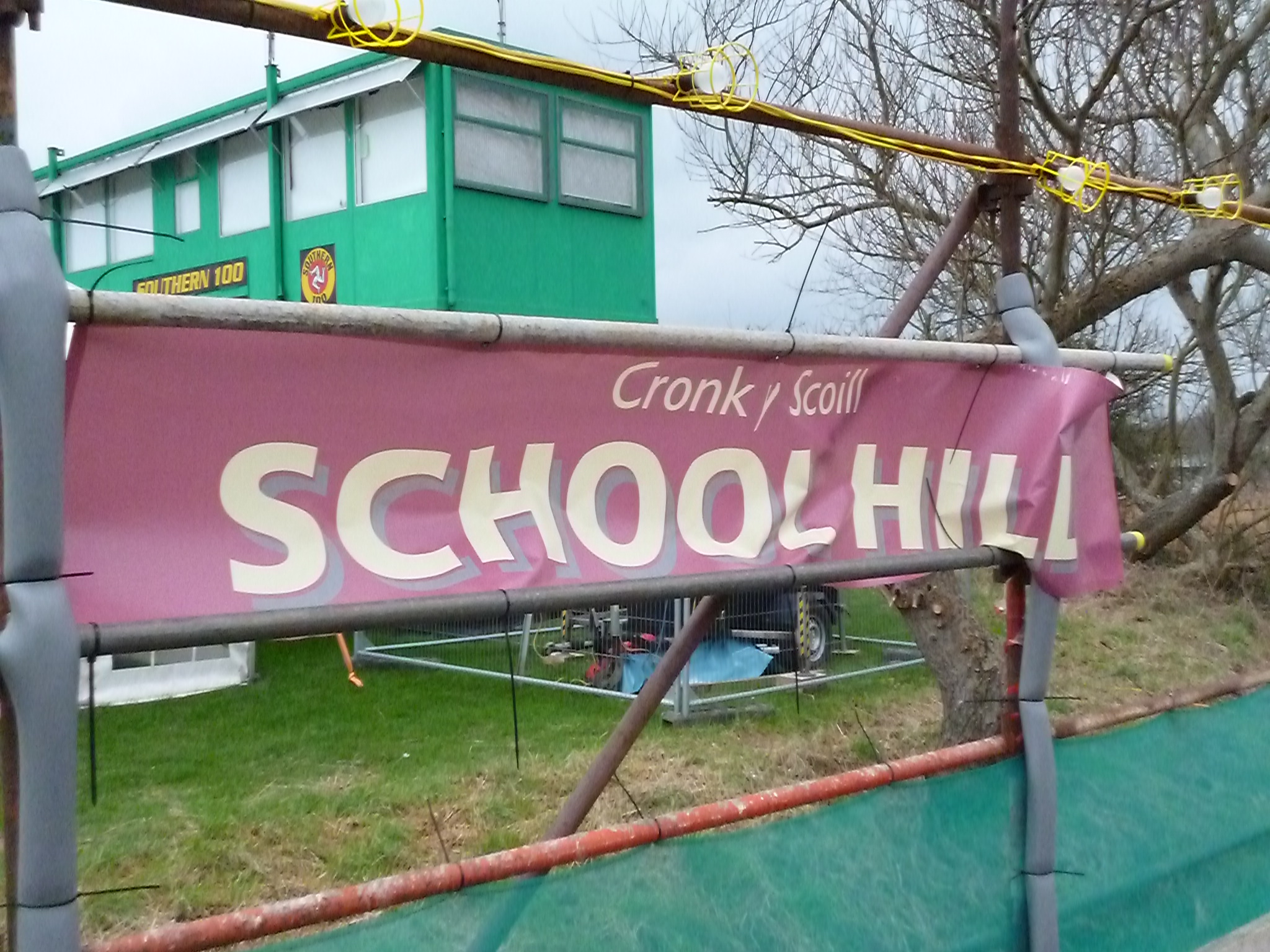
The temporary signage on the scaffold platform which was provided in the "house" style with bilingual lettering, Cronk-E-Schoil being translated from the Manx Gaelic as other signs.

Opened during strike action taken by employees of Bus Vannin during 2012, this temporary station was located approximately three-quarters of a mile to the south-west of the station and was used only by local school children attending Castle Rushen High School; it consisted of temporary scaffolding platform with a capacity for five carriages, and operated only when the buses were on strike, at which times special trains replaced the bus service. It was located close to the start-finish line of the Southern 100 circuit and was removed after a considerable time out of use in April 2014. This was the first "new" station on the line since the halt serving Lough Ned Country Park (between Douglas and Port Soderick) was established in 1979; this however was closed in 1986 upon the demise of the park. School Hill was fitted with a vinyl banner as a station running-in board in the current house style, featuring bilingual titling. When in operation the halt was staffed by a station attendant and control of it was via internal radio communication with the station. It was also used during two of the railway's Rush Hour events when a recreation Manx Northern Railway train consisting of M.N.Ry. No.4 Caledonia and The Foxdale Coach briefly stopped there for photographic opportunities. Today there is no trace of the temporary on the site.

== Environs ==
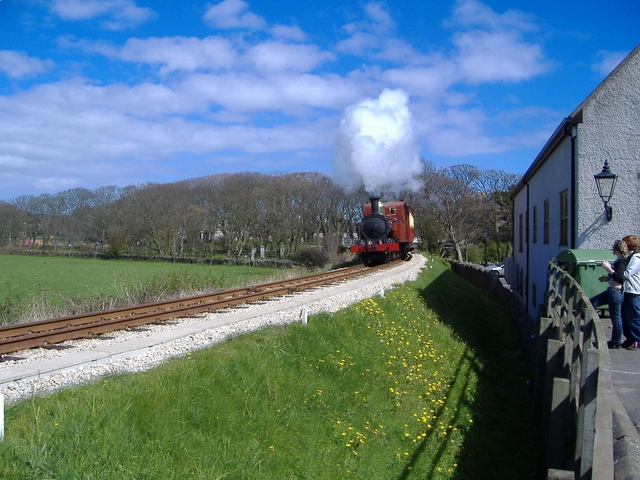
No.10 G.H. Wood on Pumphouse Curve (or occasionally "K. & L. Curve" after a garden centre which one occupied the site) is immediately to the southwest of the station; a train heads towards Mill Road Crossing; The Engine House shared office space is to the right, initially built as offices for Canada Life.

To the immediate north of the station is a stone-built footbridge which provide pedestrian access from the adjacent Poulsom Park to the privately owned King William's College which is known as Love Lane Bridge allegedly owing to assignations between college students and those at the nearby Buchan School; the railway passes underneath this structure. The south-westerly extent of the station sees the line pass over the Silverburn River by means of stone overbridge also constructed from local limestone; an occupational crossing titled Mill Road is beyond, being controlled by the station by automatic barriers. Until 2001 this was a staffed crossing and the gatekeepers' hut remains extant although disused. From this point the railway runs parallel to the by-pass road next to the route of the Southern 100 motorcycle racing circuit. In the station forecourt there are two public houses, namely The Viking (built as the Castletown Hotel) to the left and The Sidings (free house, formerly the Station Hotel and, until 2001, the Duck's Nest) to the right; the current name acknowledges its close proximity to the railway station. A petrol station is located beyond these, and a car dealership whilst across the main road a sheltered housing complex is evident; the town itself, and the famous Castle Rushen, are a short walk from the station along the banks of the Silverburn River which runs through the town to the harbour.

== Friend Of... ==
This group was formed in early 2009 by a group of local residents and the resident station master with a view to enhancing the station; small groups of volunteers occasionally meet at the station to carry out these improvements which to date have included the erection of a station flagpole (a traditional sight on many Isle of Man Railway station platforms) some painting of the station including the platform benches, provision of traditional blackboard signage to the station, and most significantly, the reinstatement of the coal fire in the waiting room for the first time in many years. The group continue to have an input to the upkeep of the station and will be donating concrete cast planters in the future for addition to the station's platforms. The group have, to date, spent many hours attending to the small details around the station, that which would not ordinarily fall under the jurisdiction of the railway's full-time staff. In 2012 the station won the commercial category of Castletown in Bloom, an annual competition, and took place in the Hidden Gardens event.

One of the seasonal station masters co-ordinates all activities and he can be contacted at the office whenever trains are in operation and he is on duty, or by telephoning the station directly. The group always welcome new members and suggestions for further enhancement of the area; a number of photographic material and ephemera relating to the station have been donated since the group's formation and these can be found on display in the waiting room which is open whenever trains are running. In 2014 the group held its first Summer Fayre on the site, raising funds for various projects including the proposed reinstatement of the station's advertisement hoarding and a replica cattle dock. This was followed by an Easter Fayre in 2015 to tie in with the railway's annual Rush Hour event with a further summer event taking place in August. Since this time the summer fayre has generally taken place annually towards the end of August, though in 2024 attention focused on the 150th anniversary of the station as part of the Manx Heritage Transport Festival.

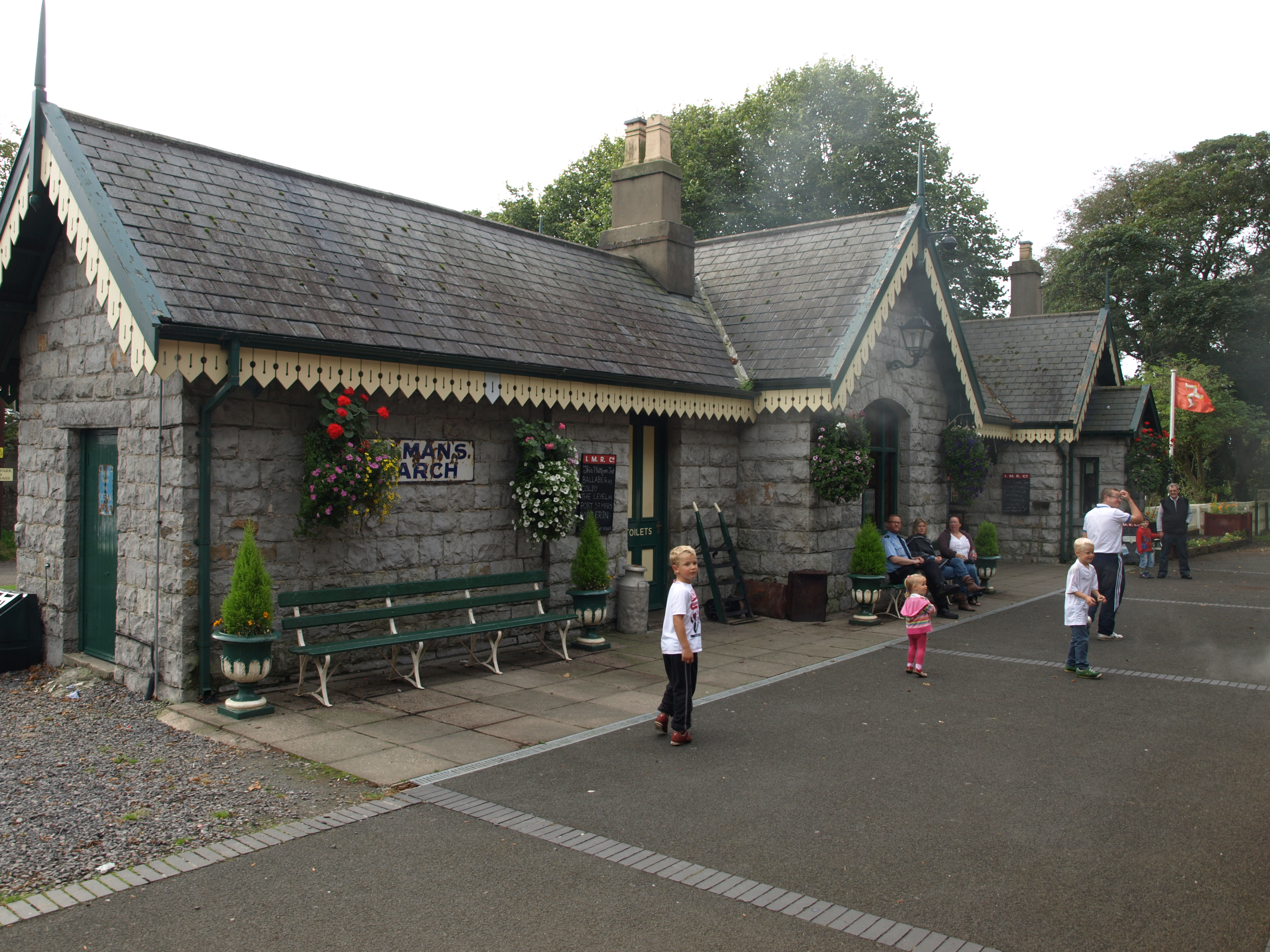
The historic building in June 2012 from a passing train showing the platform area; the doorway to the left accesses the model railway exhibition provided by the Friends Of... group

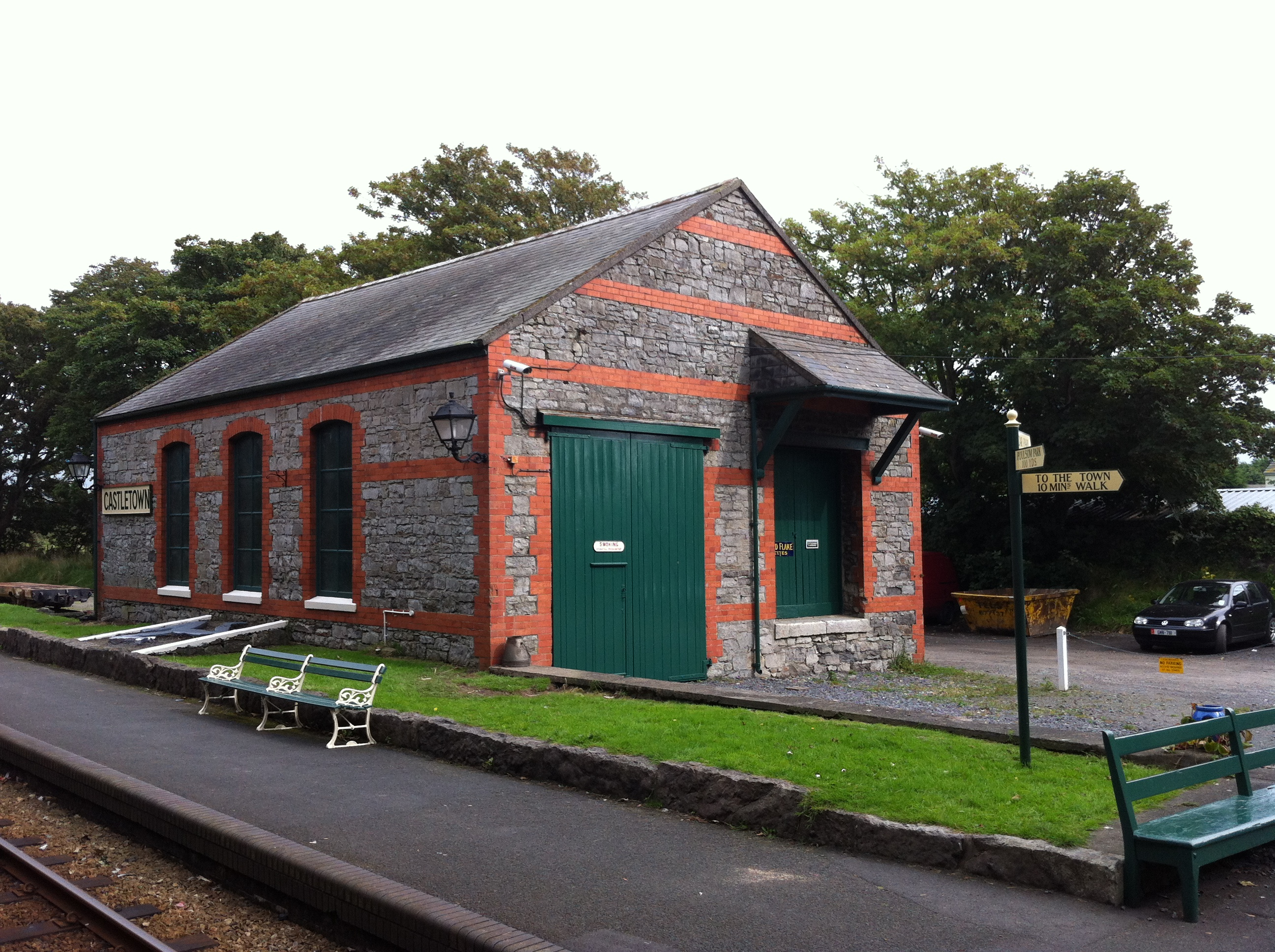
The goods shed dates from 1901 and has been considered as the home of a visitors centre by the group, pending a number of contributory factors

=== Projects ===
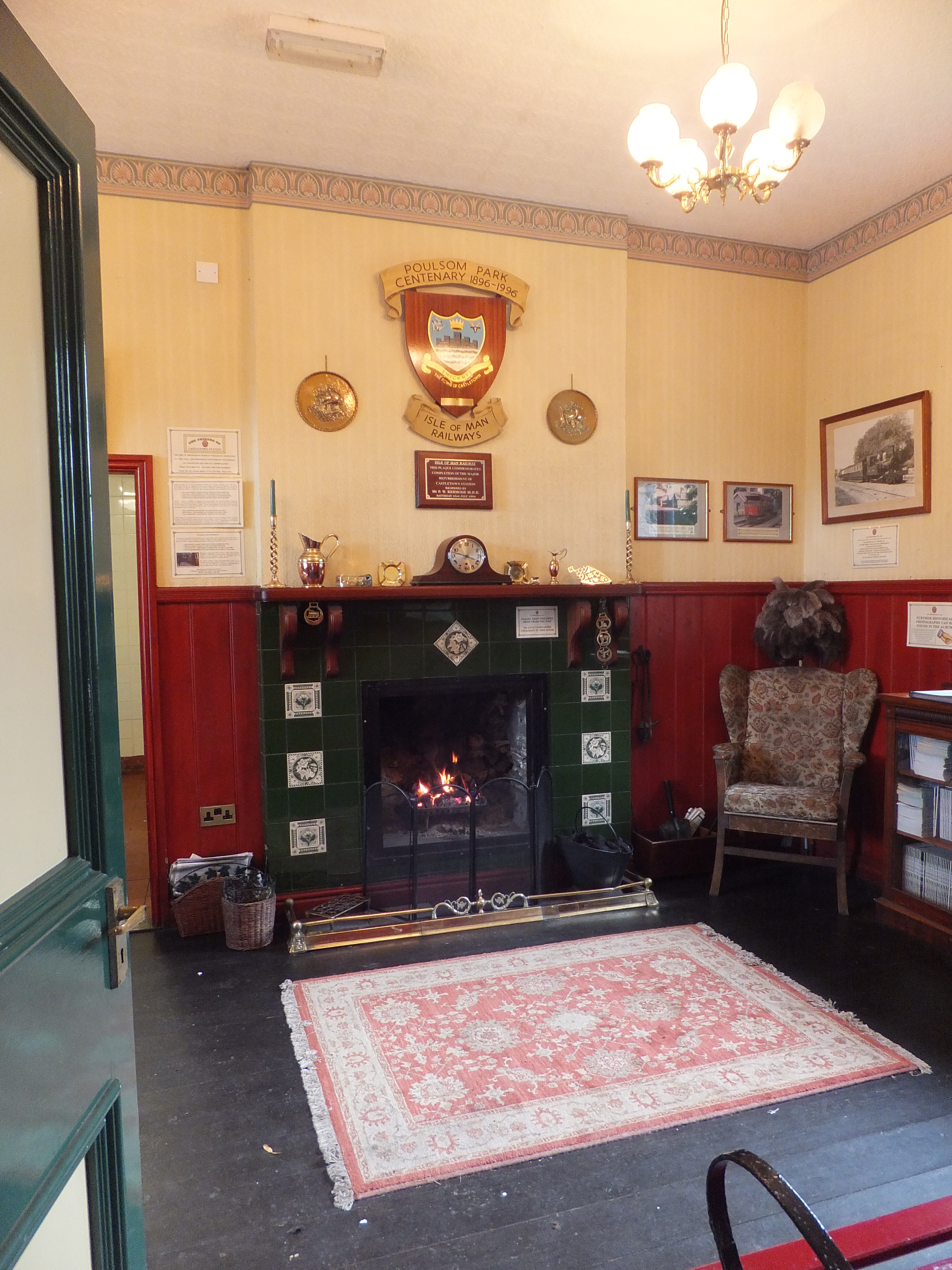
The period waiting room which has been restored by and is maintained by the Friends Of... volunteer group who funded and installed a new multi-fuel stove in the early part of 2025 and fully redecorated it in 2026 complete with refreshed historical displays and furniture.

- Reinstate Coal Fires (2010)
- Hand-Painted Signs (2011)
- Castletown in Bloom (Winner 2011)
- Provision Platform Furniture (2012)
- Castletown in Bloom (Winner 2012)
- Provision Replacement Flagpole (2013)
- Castletown in Bloom (Winner 2013)
- Tiling & Refit Fire Surrounds (2014)
- Window Railway Display (2014–2016)
- Provision Platform Furniture (2019)
- Creation of Model Room (2020)
- Cast Iron Notice Board (2021)
- Replica Advert Hoarding (2023)
- Anniversary Blue Plaque (2024)
- Coal Fire & New Stove (2025)
- Cattle Dock Replica (2026)
- Redecorate Waiting Room (2026)
- Period Telephone Kiosk (2026)
- Masonry Water Tower (2027?)
- Historical Interpretive Signage (Ongoing)
- Period Advertisements (Ongoing)
- Upkeep & Tending Lawns (Ongoing)
- Archives Display Waiting Room (Ongoing)
- Maintenance of Furniture (Ongoing)
- Seasonal Floral Displays (Ongoing)
- Waiting Room Displays (Ongoing)
- Upkeep of Platforms (Ongoing)
- Meetings With Management (Ongoing)
- Waiting Shelter Up Platform (Suggestion)
- Refreshment Facilities (Suggestion)
- Extension of Rear Siding (Suggestion)
- Locomotive Display (Suggestion)
- Rolling Stock Displays (Suggestion)
- Goods Shed Visitors Centre (Suggestion)
- Canopy Restoration (Suggestion)
- Replica Gradient Posts (Suggestion)
- Remodelling Approach Road (Suggestion)
- Audio-Visual Presentation (Suggestion)

=== Future ===
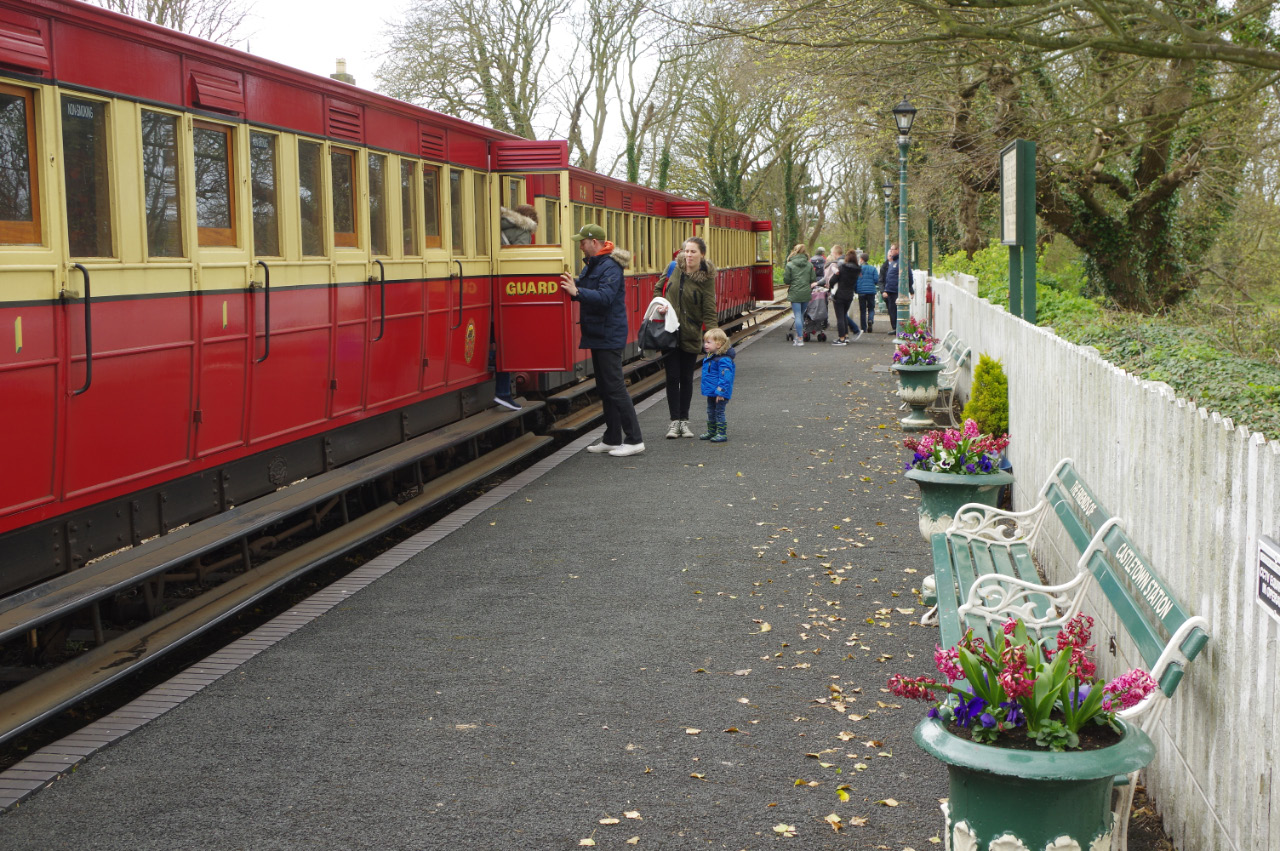
Passengers boarding a train at the northbound platform which stands adjacent to Poulsom Park and currently has no shelter, a potential project being to provide one.

The group are always working on potential new projects and have identified a number which are under development; these include the reinstatement of the cattle dock in the goods yard, recreation of decorative ridge tiles to the main building, replacement of plastic downspouts with period metal versions, remodelling the approach road, development of the goods shed as a visitors centre and adding rolling stock to the displayed items. The possibility of recreating the canopy to the building has been discussed in the past, but it is the general belief that the building presently appears in largely as-built condition and the cost involved, coupled with the amended layout of the platforms in recent times, mean it is not conducive to reinstatement. A passenger waiting shelter for the opposite platform has also been considered, basing the design on the extant shelter at Colby Station elsewhere on the line. This structure itself has historical providence as it was originally located at Braddan Station on the Peel Line which closed in 1968 and was relocated in 1988.

== Route ==
Preceding station	Isle of Man Railway	Following station
Ballabeg Station	Port Erin Line	Ronaldsway Halt

== See also ==
- Billown Circuit
- Castle Rushen
- Castletown Golf & Country Club
- Castletown
- Dreswick Point
- Hango Hill
- King William's College
- Langness Peninsula
- Level crossings
- Locomotives
- Manx Aviation & Military Museum
- Nautical museum
- Old House of Keys
- Other stations
- Rolling stock
- Ronaldsway Airport
- Scarlett Visitors Centre
- Southern "100" Races
