= Ronaldsway railway station =

Railway station in Isle of Man

Ronaldsway Halt Staad Roonysvaie
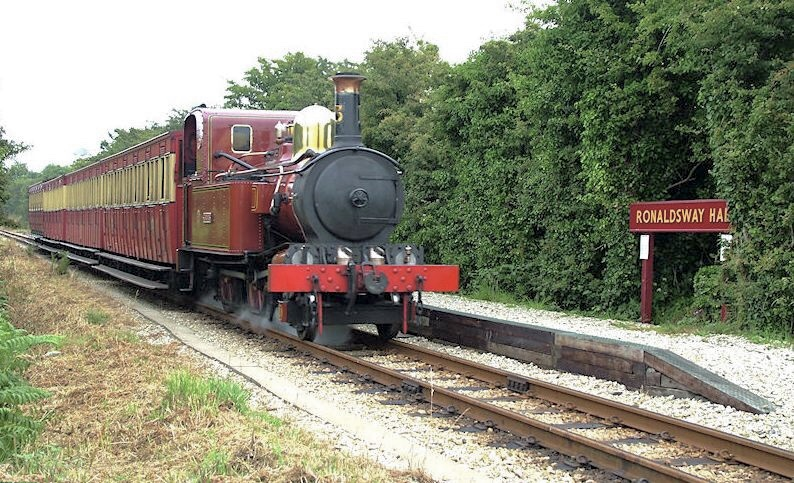

General information
- Location: Off A1 Road, Castletown, Isle of Man, IM9 1DE.
- Coordinates: 54°05′17″N 4°38′33″W
- System: The Isle of Man Railway Co., Ltd.
- Owner: Isle of Man Government; Department of Infrastructure
- Lines: Port Erin (South) Line; Between Douglas & Port Erin
- Platforms: One, Raised Half-Height
- Tracks: One Running Line

History
- Opened: 2 June 1967
- Closed: Seasonal, Since Opening
- Rebuilt: 2001 (Platforms Added)

Passengers
- Passenger Only
Location

Ronaldsway Halt (Manx: Stadd Roonysvaie) is a request stop on the Isle of Man Railway between Castletown and Ballasalla at Ronaldsway, near the Isle of Man Airport.

== Location and environs ==
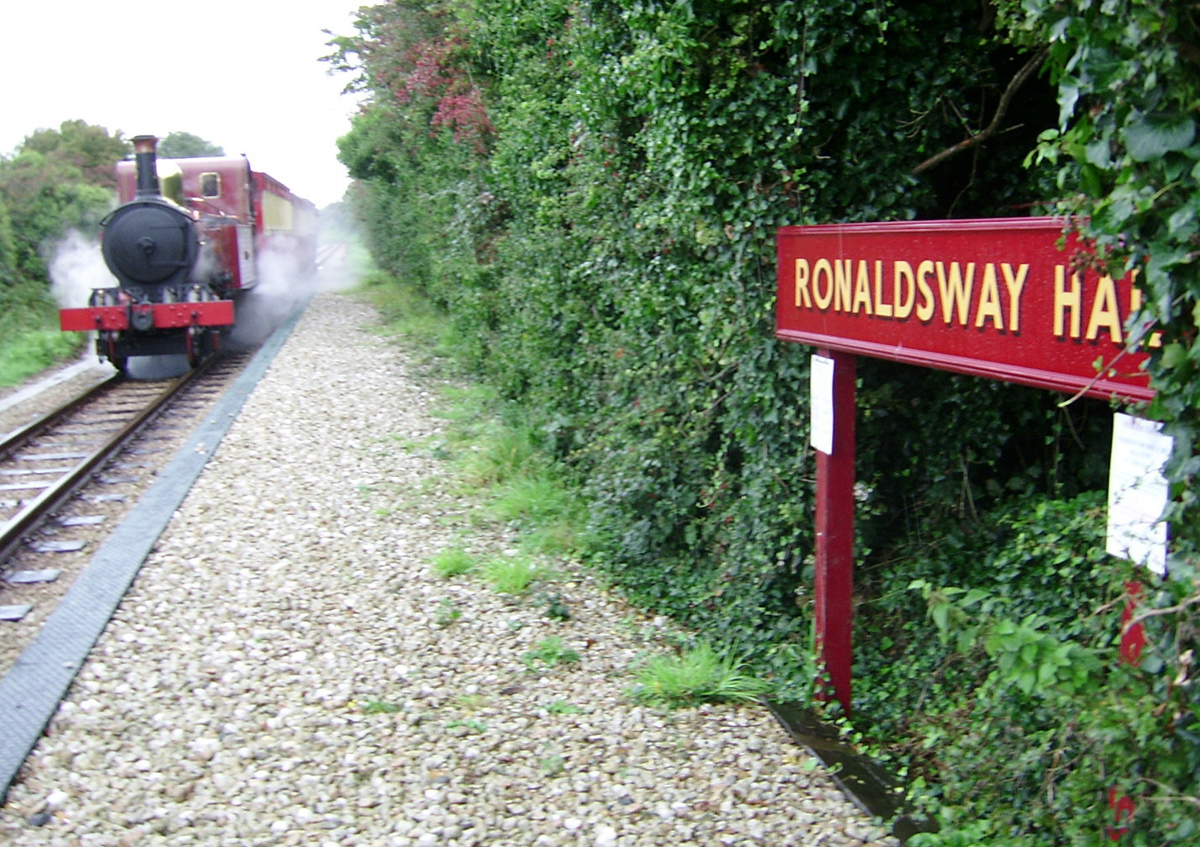
No.4 Loch arriving at the halt from the north in 2006 showing the minimal facilities provided for passengers.

The halt is situated behind the Ronaldsway Industrial Estate beside the Silverburn River at the midway point between the stations at Ballasalla and Castletown. Ronaldsway is the site of the Battle of Ronaldsway in 1275, which saw the Isle of Man transfer from Norse rule to Scottish rule; keills were excavated here and these now form part of historical displays at the Story Of Mann in Douglas. On the west side of the halt is a large field known as the Great Meadow which was once a horse racing track and later played host to the island's annual southern agricultural show; there were special trains for both these events.

== History ==
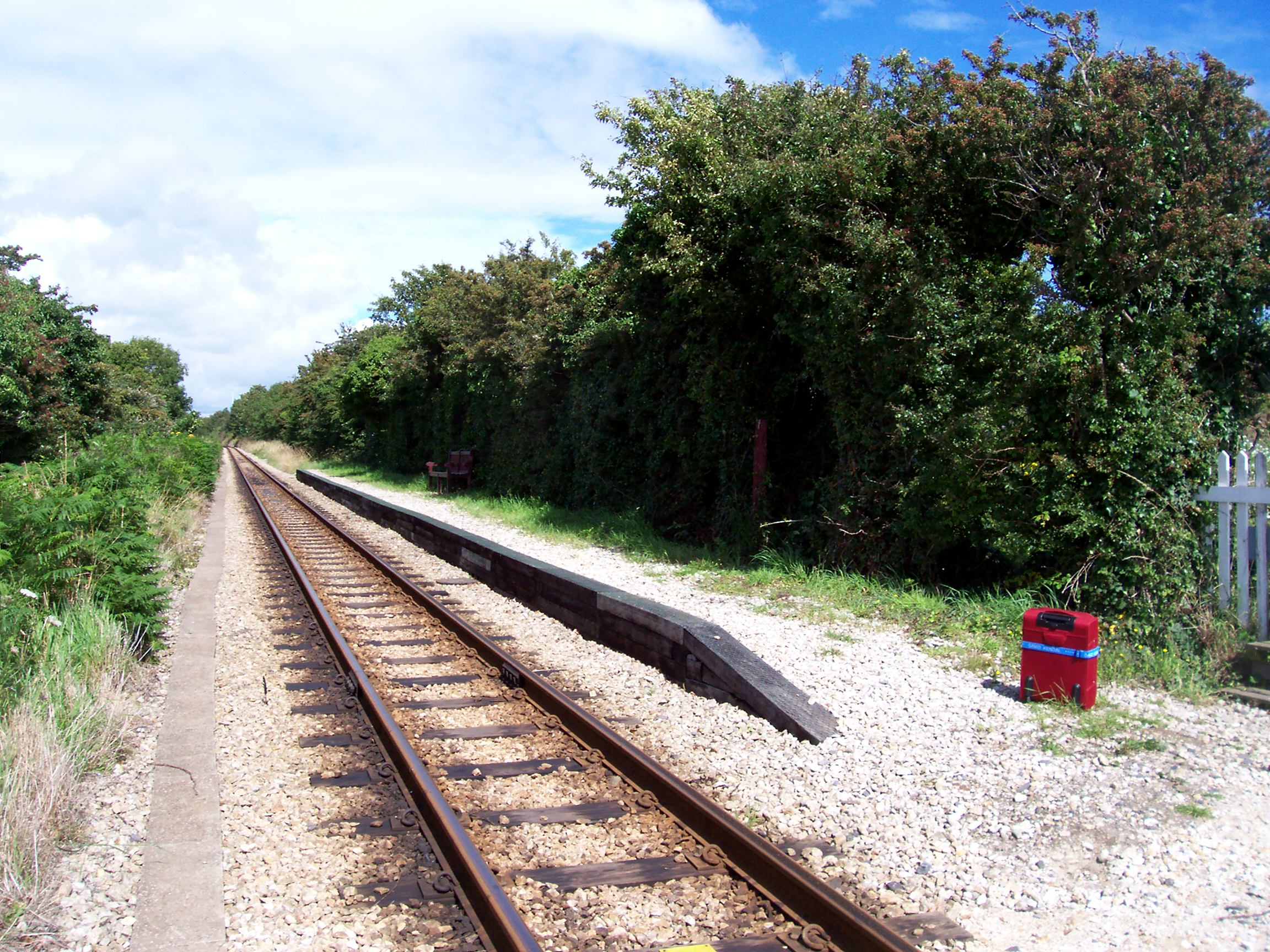
The raised platform of sleepers which is capable of accommodating four bogie carriages

The halt was introduced in 1967, to compete for airport traffic with buses and taxis. At that time there was just a simple nameboard, and the halt was mentioned only intermittently in timetables. As part of a major overhaul of the entire line as part of an all-island sewerage network in 2001, a pipeline was laid beneath the railway line and the permanent way completely replaced, the halt received a small waiting platform consisting of built up sleepers. Passengers wishing to board the train here can signal the driver to stop the train; to alight from the train the guard must be notified in advance. Because of the short walk from the airport, air passengers leave and board trains here; it is also a popular drop-off spot for walkers, being close to the Millennium Way footpath established in 1979.

== Running-In Board ==
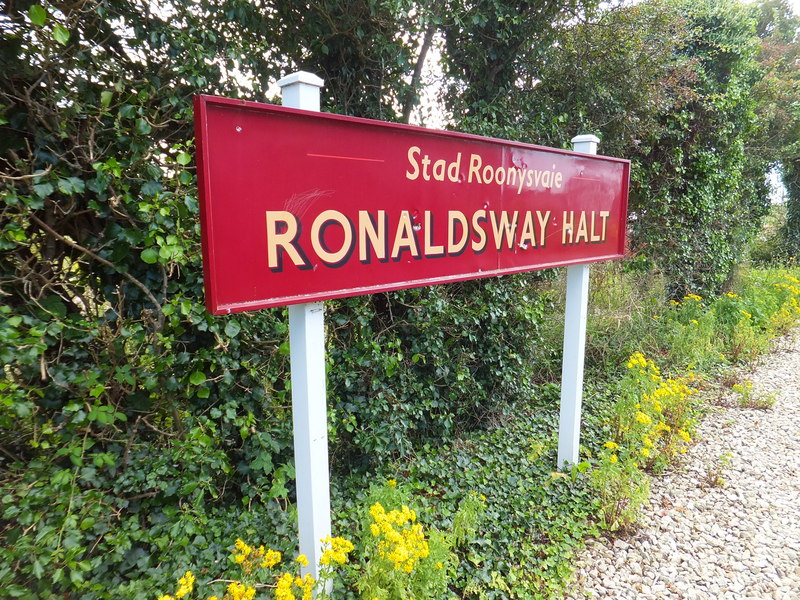

The request stop's name is taken from that of the nearby airport, the island's only such commercial airport and was named as such from its inception with a white board and red lettering. For the 1971 season only it was re-titled as Great Meadow Halt in reference to the large field and one-time race course that lies adjacent to the halt which was still operational at the time and from which the railway gained some trade that summer. For some subsequent seasons the stop did not feature in any timetable literature though it continued to be served by request. When bilingual Manx/English nameboards were introduced on the line beginning in 2008, a replacement running-in board was added showing the Manx Gaelic name of Staad Roonysvie and is still in place today with some variation in styling appearing from 2022. Although closed during the pandemic with there being no commercial flights for a period, the signs remained in place with closure notices added. Since the beginning of the 2022 season it has again been in regular use despite not appearing in the timetable literature.

== Route ==
Preceding station	Isle of Man Railway	Following station
Castletown	Port Erin Line	Ballasalla

== See also ==
- Isle of Man Railway stations
- Ronaldsway
- Isle of Man Airport
