= 2009 Southern 100 Races =

(Isle of Man) 2009 Southern 100
Race details
| Date | 13–16 July 2009 |
| Location | Castletown, Isle of Man |
| Course | Road Course; 4.25 mi (6.84 km) |

The 2009 Southern 100 Races were held between Monday 13 July and Thursday 16 July on the 4.25-mile Billown Circuit near Castletown, Isle of Man.

The main event was won by Guy Martin claiming victory in the 2009 Southern 100 Solo Championship race. Sixteen races were held, with Ryan Farquhar taking the most wins with four victories. Roy Richardson and William Dunlop took double victories with, Jamie O'Brien, Dennis Booth, Dave Madsen-Mygdal and Stephen McIlvenna all achieving solo victories. Steven Coombes and Paul Knapton, Ian and Carl Bell, and Glyn Jones and Jason Slous all tasted sidecar success during the meeting.

== Race results ==
=== Race 12; 2009 Southern 100 Solo Championship Race final standings ===
Thursday 16 July 2009 10 laps – 4.250 miles Billown Circuit (Reduced Race Distance)

| Rank | Rider | Team | Time | Speed |
|---|---|---|---|---|
| 1 | (England) Guy Martin | Honda 1000cc | 20' 44.823 | 110.618 mph |
| 2 | (Northern Ireland) Ryan Farquhar | Kawasaki 1000cc | + 0.163 | 110.604 mph |
| 3 | (Isle of Man) Conor Cummins | Kawasaki 1000cc | + 0.770 | 110.550 mph |
| 4 | (Northern Ireland) Michael Dunlop | Honda 1000cc | + 0.777 | 110.549 mph |
| 5 | (Wales) Ian Lougher | Yamaha 1000cc | + 33.21 | 107.774 mph |
| 6 | (Isle of Man) Stephen Oates | Suzuki 1000cc | + 48.114 | 106.502 mph |
| 7 | (England) James McBride | Yamaha 1000cc | + 50.687 | 106.290 mph |
| 8 | (England) Scott Wilson | Suzuki 1000cc | + 1' 12.550 | 104.526 mph |
| 9 | (Northern Ireland) Davy Morgan | Yamaha 1000cc | + 1' 13.126 | 104.481 mph |
| 10 | (New Zealand) Paul Dobbs | Honda 1000cc | + 1' 13.797 | 104.427 mph |

Fastest Lap: Ryan Farquhar, 2' 16.401 112.619 mph on lap 9
