= Colby railway station =

Small railway station in the south of the Isle of Man

Colby Stashoon Raad Yiarn Cholby
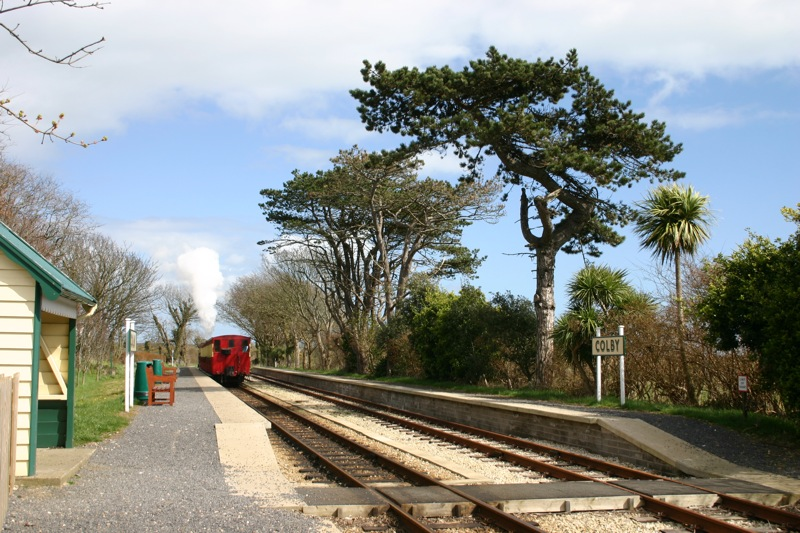

General information
- Location: Off Station Road, Colby, Isle Of Man IM9 4DR
- Coordinates: 54°05′40″N 4°42′15″W
- System: The Isle of Man Railway Co., Ltd.
- Owner: Isle of Man Government; Department of Infrastructure
- Lines: Port Erin (South)Line; Between Douglas & Port Erin
- Platforms: Two, Raised; Full Height
- Tracks: Two Running Lines

Construction
- Structure type: Open Shelter
- Parking: Dedicated, Adjacent

History
- Opened: 1874
- Closed: Seasonally Since 1965
- Rebuilt: 1991 / 2001
- Former names: Isle of Man Railway Co.

Passengers
- Passenger Only (Since 1958, Goods Previously)

Services
Waiting Shelter
Location

Colby railway station (Manx: Stashoon Raad Yiarn Cholby) is a small railway station on the southern edge of the village of Colby in the south of the Isle of Man served by the Isle of Man Railway; it forms part of the sole remaining section of the network which once covered over 46 miles island-wide.

== Origins ==
The railway station was established in 1874 it consisted of a goods siding, with a ground level platform, waiting room and station master's office on the north side of the running line. The building was of the same design as the one at Ballasalla railway station which was demolished in 1985, and the one still extant at Santon railway station. A passing loop was added in 1907 breaking the 5 mile 5 furlong single line section between Castletown and Port Erin into two almost equal sections.

== Location ==
Trains approach the railway station from the north on a right curve and depart in a southerly direction in a straight section that lasts until the level road crossing via Kentraugh Farm occupational crossing. The railway station is located on the outskirts of the village, and the houses that back onto the perimeter of the railway station on one side are that of the local authority. The village has its own public house, the Colby Glen which is visible in the trees to the north of the railway station, and the housing can be seen from the passing trains. In 2011 the local football club established new headquarters in the field to the seaward side of the railway station, for which a new automated level crossing was installed at the northern extent of the railway station. This was the first new level crossing on the railway for over a century. The railway station is a mandatory stopping place and one of the busiest on the line for local traffic, popular with locals who travel by train to do their shopping in either Douglas or Port Erin.

== Rationalisation ==
The building here survived through nationalisation and was demolished in 1980, leaving no shelter for waiting passengers. The former goods platform is still distinguishable on the westerly side of the railway station, the siding itself being long-since lifted. Until 1991 the pointwork was still in place at the northerly end of the railway station but this was removed when remedial works were carried out at this time. In 1991 the shelter from Braddan Bridge on the long-abandoned line to Peel was refurbished and moved here, but since the railway station received platforms on both up and down sides of the loop in conjunction with an all-island sewerage network in 2002, the waiting shelter is no longer at platform height, being left in-situ at a lower point giving it an unusual appearance in respect of the actual platforms.

== Translation ==
The railway station is unique in being the only one on the line to not carry bi-lingual railway station nameboards because the name translated carries exactly the same spelling, but this does lead to an inconsistency of naming along the line.

== Route ==
Preceding station	Isle of Man Railway	Following station
The Level	Port Erin Line	Ballabeg

== See also ==
- Isle of Man Railway stations
- Colby, Isle of Man
