= The Level railway station =

Railway station in Isle of Man, the UK

The Level Railway Station Stashoon Raad-Yiarn yn Laare
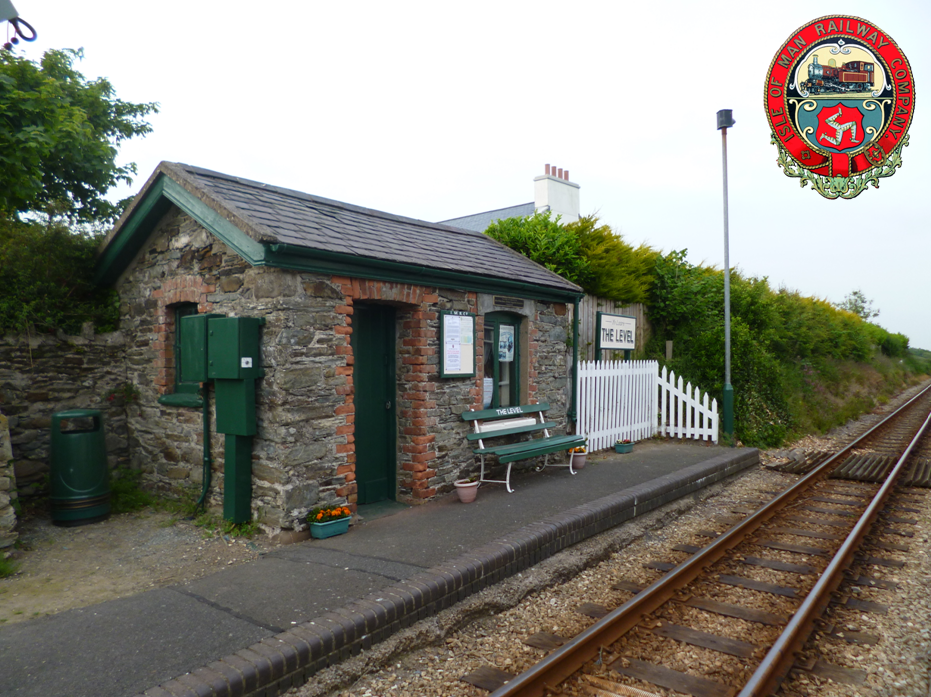
- The 1887 Crossing Lodge

General information
- Location: Croit-E-Caley, Rushen Parish; Isle of Man, IM8 6YR.
- Coordinates: 54°05′29″N 4°43′16″W
- System: The Isle of Man Railway Co., Ltd.
- Owner: Isle of Man Government; Department of Infrastructure
- Lines: Port Erin (South) Line; Between Douglas & Port Erin
- Platforms: One (Short), Raised
- Tracks: One Running Line

Construction
- Structure type: Stone Lodge
- Platform levels: "Half-Height" Macadam
- Parking: Roadside Only (Restricted)

History
- Opened: 2 August 1874
- Closed: Seasonally Since 1965

Passengers
- Passenger Only / Goods Formerly (Until 2000)

Services
Waiting Area / Bench Seat / Historical Displays
Location

The Level (sometimes erroneously referred to as Colby Level despite being located in Rushen, or simply Level) (Manx: Yn Laare) is a seasonally operated request stop on the Isle of Man Railway located in the sheading of Rushen on the Isle of Man. This is the sole remaining section of the railway which once spanned over 46 miles with lines to Peel in the west, Ramsey in the north and the mining village of Foxdale in the centre of the island.

== Origins ==
The crossing point was established with the opening of the line on 1 August 1874 where the railway bisected a small road between the main Colby to Port Erin Road and the coast road passing the nearby Kentraugh House; it became an unofficial stopping place for the local populace shortly afterwards and by 1877 plans had been made to provide a substantial crossing keepers' hut which was later accompanied by a keepers' lodge house. The surrounding rural area grew although initially the stop was not mentioned officially in any timetable literature.

== Locale ==
This diminutive request stop serves the hamlets or individual houses of Level (Rushen), Croit-E-Caley, Kentraugh, Ballagawie and Ballakillowey. The 1 km section of line from the previous station (Colby) is straight and has a level crossing for Kentraugh Farm in the centre of it; to the west, towards Port St Mary, the line curves to the left on the approach to the next crossing for Ballagawne Farm and continues to Four Roads crossing. In more recent times a housing estate called Strawberry Field has been established a short distance from the halt, this was installed by the local authority.

Until recently the road that leads to the level crossing also served the local Level Garage and until well into the 1990s trains carried motor parts from Douglas for dropping off at this point; the garage was closed in 2000 and the site has since been redeveloped into residential housing. The village that has built up around the level crossing site has been expanded considerably since the arrival of the railway making the halt frequently utilised during the summer months. A large private residential dwelling was established directly behind the station site from 2004 and this now dominates the railway premises with tall conifer trees; the area is now somewhat more residential than before.

== Naming origin ==
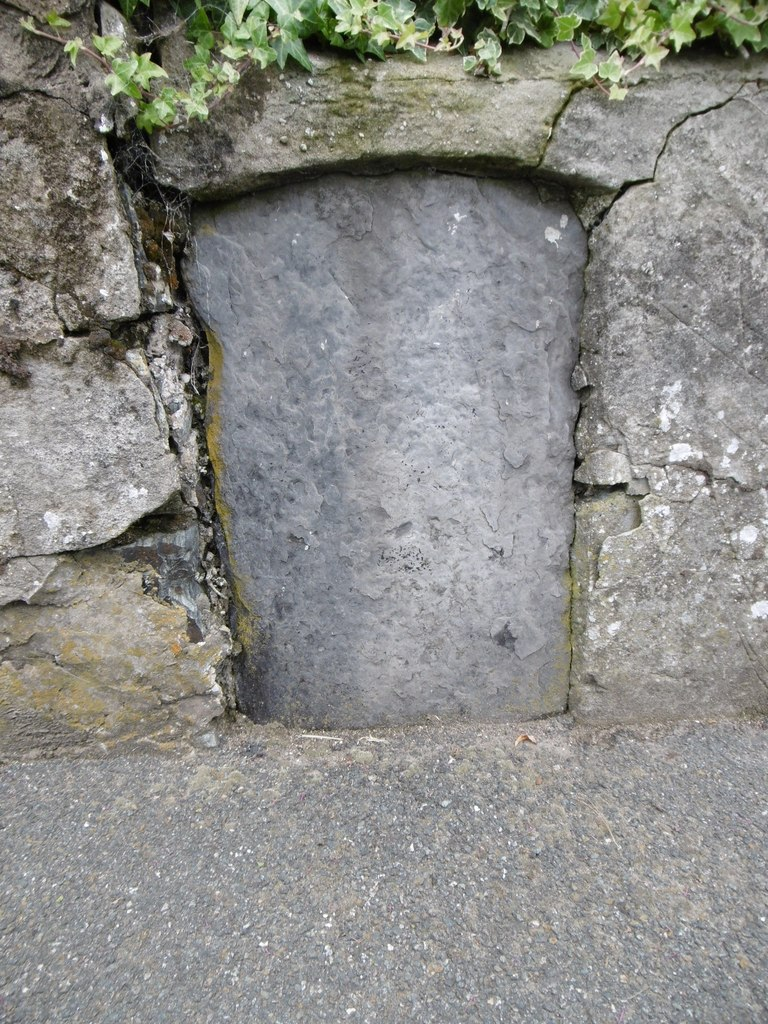
The milestone from which the station derives its correct name which is located on the A7 road a short distance away

The title is believed to derive from the once prolific mining activity in the surrounding area, being a reference to the "level" of one of the mine adits; the mine ruins are still discernible in the hills directly above the area. It is one of two areas that carry the colloquial name, the other being Level Rushen, although the two are often confused as they are in the same sheading of the island. The name was adopted by the railway when the site officially became a request stop as early as 1928 when it first appeared in the timetable. Today the painted running-in board declares the halt as The Level (bilingual since 2008 to include the Yn Laare translation into the Gaelic) but in the past it has been variously (and incorrectly) called Colby Level, Level, Level (Rushen) etc., and a metal nameboard stating Colby Level - Crossing installed in 1973 remained in place until 2013; the timetable uses "The Level" in all literature as correct to all reference sources. The origin of the name comes from the stretch of main road at the top of the lane that leads from the level crossing, being a straight level section when macadamed, the name being used in local parlance ever since. The halt is usually timetabled in the railway's literature but the 2011 timetable for example omits to give the stopping places; the halt however remains open as a request stop despite this. It is also called the level due to the adit level at Colby, as part of the Ballacorkish mine near Colby. Today, all references to "Colby" are removed from timetabling literature in order to avoid confusion with Colby Station itself which is a mandatory stopping place whereas The Level remains a request stop only, though the use of the incorrect title persists in some quarters to add confusion.

== Crossing ==
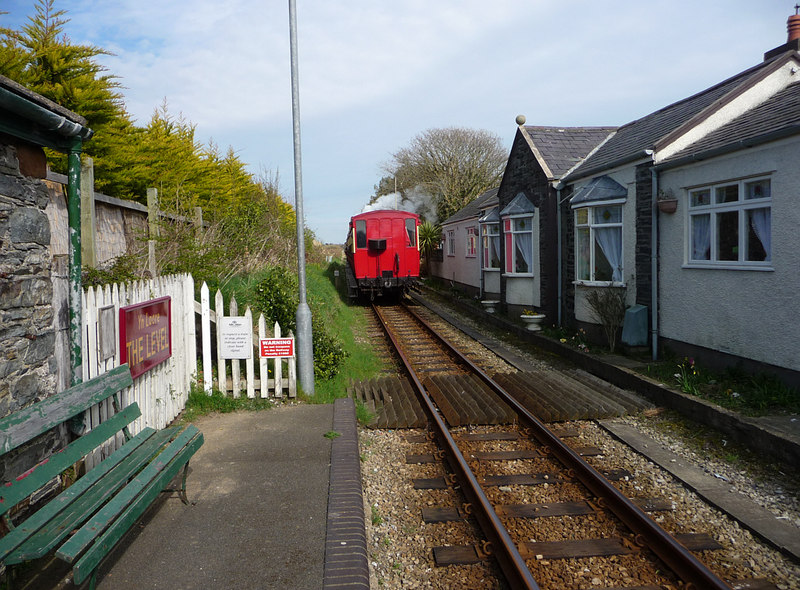
Towards Colby Station

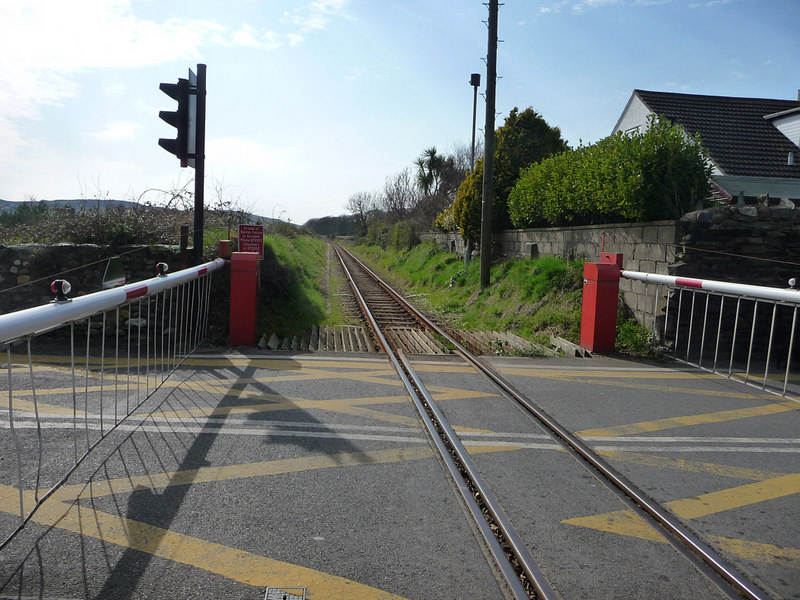
Towards Port St. Mary

=== Gated ===
The gated crossing was staffed by a dedicated gatekeeper who lived in the adjacent house, this was commonly part of the job specification for the keeper, frequently being a familiar member to another employee who worked elsewhere on the system, more often than not as train crew; latterly when the railway's operation became seasonal a part-time member of staff would operate the crossing and the house was sold off and heavily extended beginning in 1972; the small lodge itself was equipped with an open coal fire, fuel for which was delivered from passing trains. This remains in place today but has fallen out of use since 2002.

=== Automatic ===
Automatic lifting barriers were introduced in 2002 (these becoming commonplace along the entire line at the same time with the notable exceptions of Droghadfayle Road in Port Erin at Ballastrang just south of Santon Station) and the manually operated gates were removed at this time. Since then the crossing keeper's hut has been unstaffed but remains in situ housing storage facilities for the railway out of season. At that time a section of raised platform, of just one carriage length, was also installed at the request of a regular passenger. The dwelling that lies opposite the crossing lodge was once the gatekeepers' house, though this was sold off by the railway in 1972. It now carries the name Station Cottage.

== Restorations ==
=== February 2013 ===
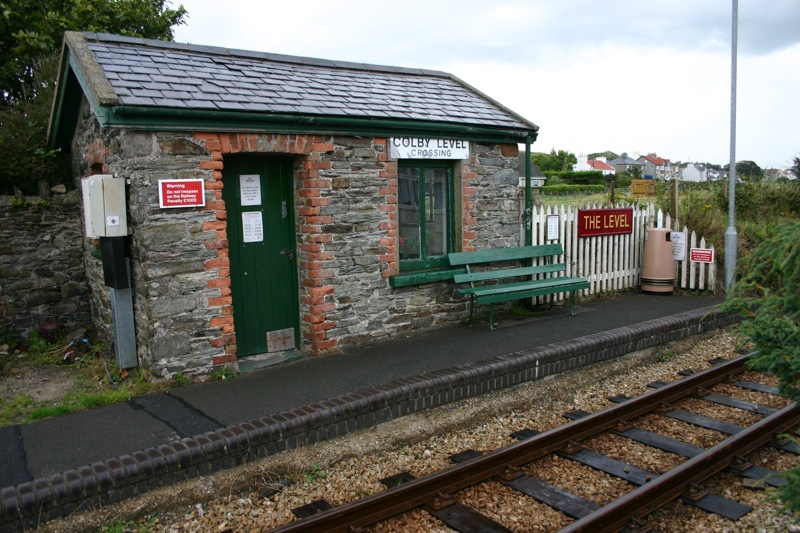
2006 Pre-Restoration

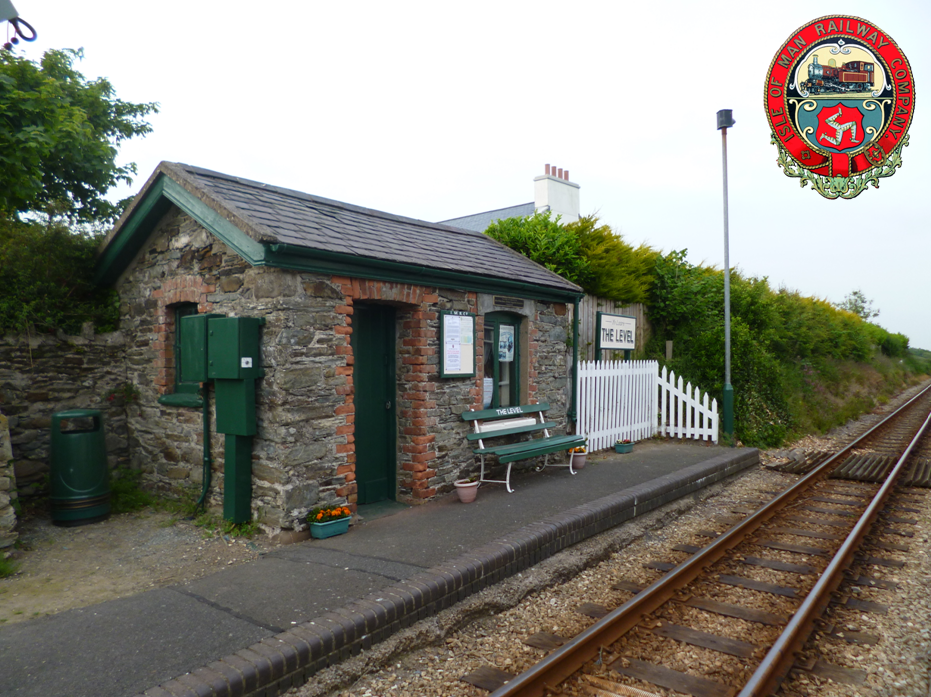
2017 As Restored

In February 2013 the crossing lodge and its environs were restored by volunteers from the Isle of Man Steam Railway Supporters' Association, the only charity dedicated to the continued restoration and operation of the railway; the project marked a return to active "hands-on" railway volunteering by the group after a considerable break for a number of reasons. The lodge was restored, new period signage fitted and the surrounding area smartened up, the opportunity also being taken to standardise the naming (see above) so that all literature and notices refer to it as "The Level" rather than any of the previous unclear connotations used. This name was chosen following historical research into contemporary documentation which shows this as the most-used title for the request stop over many years.

=== Listed status ===
In 2013 it was successfully added to the island's list of protected buildings, being one of very few such lodges remaining and of historical and cultural significance; other buildings along the line are being similarly treated thanks to the Association. Similar structures at Four Roads, Ballagawne and Ballasalla have had similar applications made on the grounds of their importance, as well as several of the main stations, notably Castletown and Port St. Mary.

=== June 2020 ===
In a follow-up to their initial works in 2013, volunteers from the Isle of Man Steam Railway Supporters' Association revisited the site following easement of COVID-19 restrictions in July 2020 and once again repaired and repainted the diminutive halt, opting for a uniform maroon appearance and working in conjunction with the island's Department of Infrastructure to ensure some deteriorating woodwork was replaced; the opportunity was also taken to add some traditional railway concrete plant pots along the platform and replace the station's running in board which was time-expired. Local residents also tend to the floral displays on the platform which were expanded upon for the 2021 season.

== Routes ==
Preceding station	Isle of Man Railway	Following station
Port St. Mary	Port Erin Line	Colby

== See also ==
- Other Stopping Places
- Rushen, Isle of Man
- Other Level Crossings
