= Isle of Man Steam Railway Supporters' Association =

Railway preservationist group on the Isle of Man

Isle of Man Steam Railway Supporters’ Association Ltd.
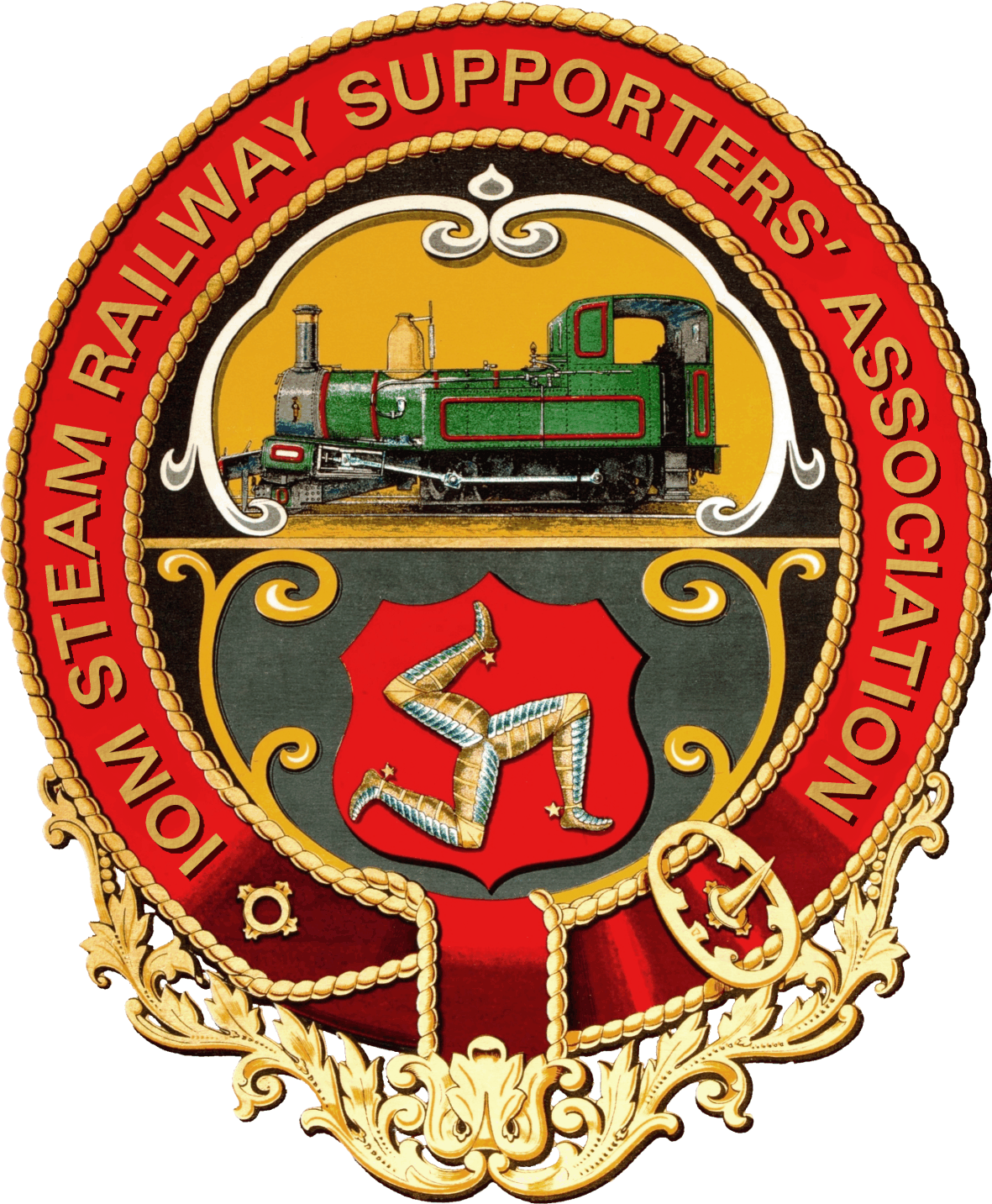
- Company Crest
- Abbreviation: I.o.M.S.R.S.A.
- Formation: November 29, 1976; 49 years ago(as limited company, 1966 as unincorporated body)
- Founded: 1966
- Founder: Sir Paterson Fraser
- Type: Charitable Organization
- Registration no.: 249
- Legal status: Active Charity
- Purpose: To preserve, promote and conserve all aspects of the railway
- Headquarters: Thornhill, Bayrauyr Road, St. Marks, Ballamodha, Isle of Man, IM9 3AT
- Chairman Secretary Treasurer: William Cubbon Grant Taylor John Fayle
- Publication: Is This Any Way To Run A Railway? Lampoon Manx Steam Railway News Quarterly Journal A 1960 Photographic Journey Album Another Photographic Journey 1962 Album The 1966 Almanac Compendium Volume
- Website: www.iomsrsa.org

The Isle of Man Steam Railway Supporters' Association Ltd (I.o.M.S.R.S.A., commonly known as The Supporters) is a railway preservationist group dedicated to ensuring the continued operation of the Isle of Man Railway on the Isle of Man with over seven decades of work in and around the railway.

Since its inception in 1966 the group has provided volunteer workers, acted in a watchdog role and undertaken the restoration of the Groudle Glen Railway on the island, as well as supporting projects on the railway and producing the journal, Manx Steam Railway News.

They also carry out major rolling stock projects and in 2026 marked their own diamond jubilee as part of the Manx Heritage Transport Festival with special trains, displays of past projects and the publication of The 1966 Almanac detailing the formation of the group and key events in that particular year.

== History ==
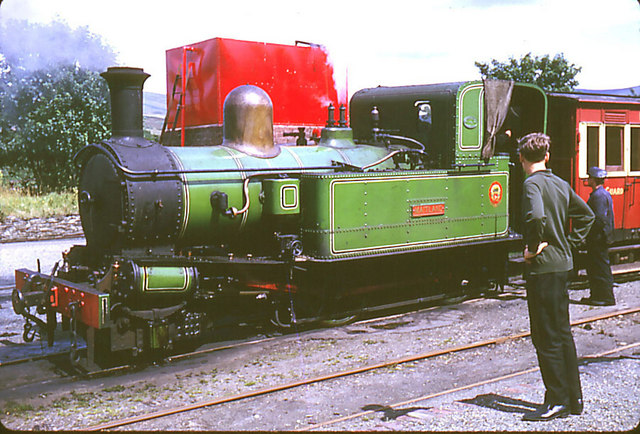
No. 11 Maitland at St. John's Station in July 1967, the line's penultimate year of full operation.

The group merged with the Mannin Railway Group to form one association in 1966 when the future of the Isle of Man Railway hung in the balance; the railway did not operate any services in that year for the first time since the line to Peel was opened in 1873. In 1967 however, the full network (save for the Foxdale Railway which had closed back in 1940) was reopened owing to the intervention of the Marquess of Ailsa who ran services until September 1968; but then the lines to Peel and Ramsey were closed for good. This was a period of concern for the Supporters' Association but the future of the line to Port Erin was assured and trains ran on this line from 1969 onwards. The centenaries in 1973 and 1974 were celebrated by running special trains. In 1975 and 1976 services were curtailed between Port Erin and Castletown, then Port Erin and Ballasalla and the group became politically active in fighting for the retention of the full southern line. Following a major campaign trains returned to Douglas in 1977 and after nationalisation in 1978 the group took on more of a watchdog role, ultimately moving on to restore the Groudle Glen Railway whilst maintaining strong connections with the Isle of Man Railway into the twenty first century.

== Volunteering ==
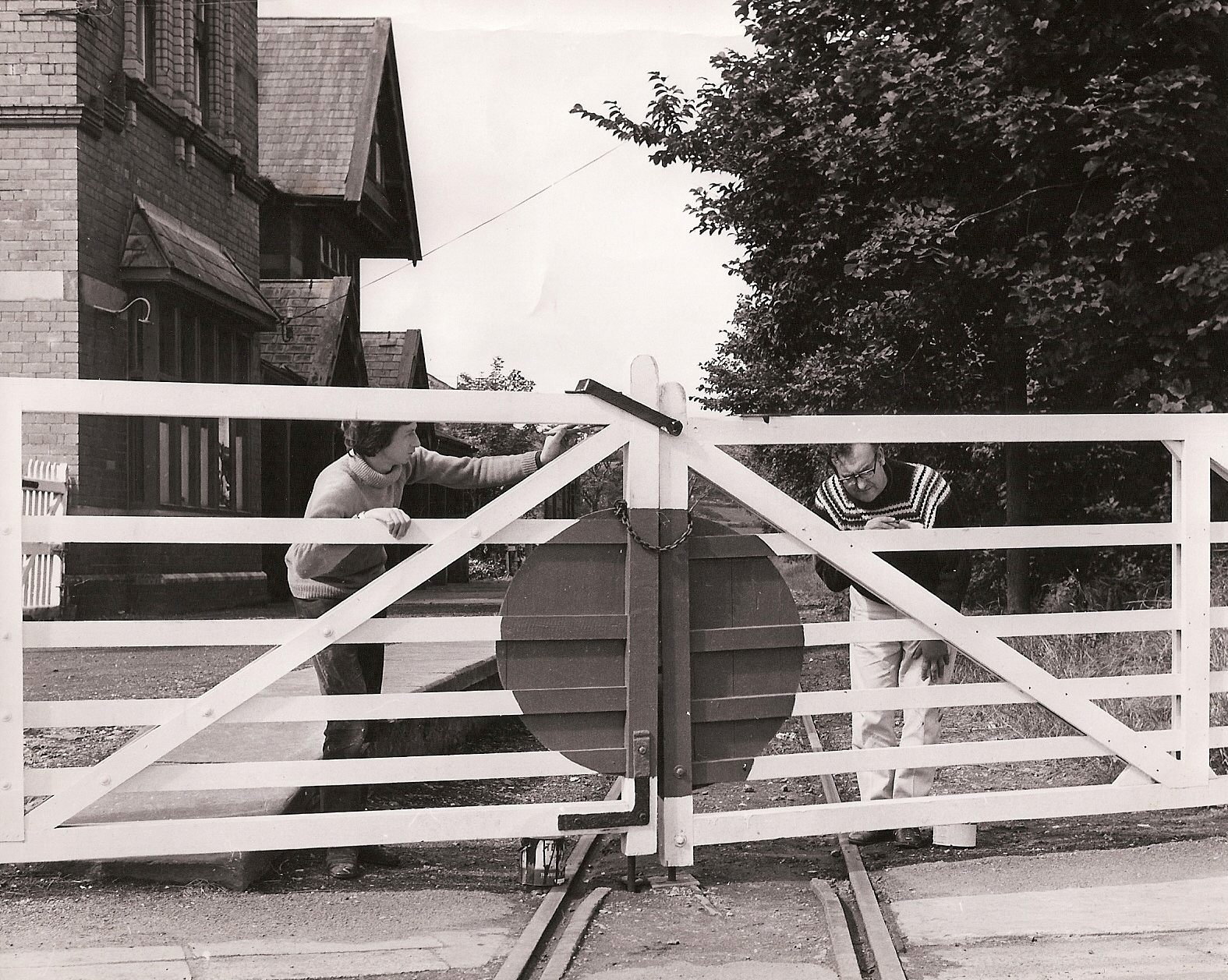
Volunteers from the Supporters' Association repainting the crossing gates at Port St. Mary Station in July 1973; until the nationalisation of the line in 1978 the Association maintained an active volunteer presence on the railway, both operationally by providing guards and gatekeepers, and peripheral works such as painting and maintenance at the lineside; these efforts were later concentrated on their restoration of the Groudle Glen Railway

In its time the Supporters' Association has undertaken many supportive projects on the railway, from the basic painting and maintenance of level crossing gates (which were controversially replaced with automated barriers in 2001) to more menial matters such as the general tidying up of stations along the line, at one time their input ranged all the way up to providing volunteer operational staff such as station masters and train guards each summer during the 1970s. However, by 1978 when the railway was nationalised the role of the group decreased somewhat with volunteer-based workers causing difficulties within a government-run organisation. An ambitious attempt to fully restore a steam locomotive (No.9 Douglas, built by Beyer, Peacock & Company at its Gorton Foundry in 1896 and withdrawn from traffic in 1953) was aborted and so after much deliberation of other major projects (and having used some the intended funds to re-tube No. 11 Maitland in 1981) in 1982 the association began the ambitious restoration project of the Groudle Glen Railway which, since that time has been re-opened in its entirety and now operates at weekends and certain evenings in the summer months. The railway is owned entirely by the Supporters' Association and operated by volunteer labour. Since this time all the volunteer labour provided by the members of the group is concentrated on the railway at Groudle Glen and activities connected to the Isle of Man Railway have been predominantly fund-raising and/or provision of parts. A number of works have also been undertaken to stations along the line, notably at Castletown, Ballabeg, The Level and Port St. Mary as well as larger projects including cosmetic restoration of out-of-use locomotives.

== Projects ==
Since the organisation's inception it has had a pro-active role on the railway; prior to the nationalisation in 1978 they undertook tasks on the line such as the re-painting of station buildings, tending to flower beds at the stations, upkeep of the level crossing gates, etc. After the government took ownership the association took on more of watchdog role and ultimately took on their own major project in the resurrection of the Groudle Glen Railway in 1982;

The association has also been vocal in its support of the completion of the rebuild of the diesel railcars which (as at April 2024) are in store uncompleted at Douglas Station. Representatives of the association attend regular meetings with the relevant government department. In 2003 a preservation policy was put in place, thereby securing the future of the line in a way sympathetic to its origins, ensuring that they are consulted when any major projects are considered by the railway's management. Potential projects are discussed at board level on a regular basis, ensuring the group's continued commitment to the preservation of the railway and its historical stations and stock, reflected in the proposed items on the list above.

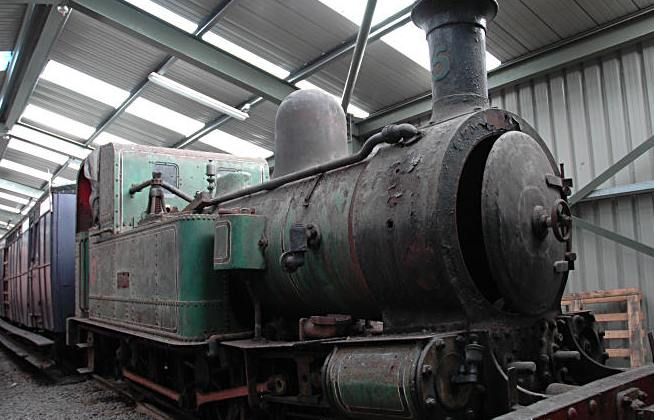
No.5 Mona stored in 2007 prior to cosmetic restoration work commencing.

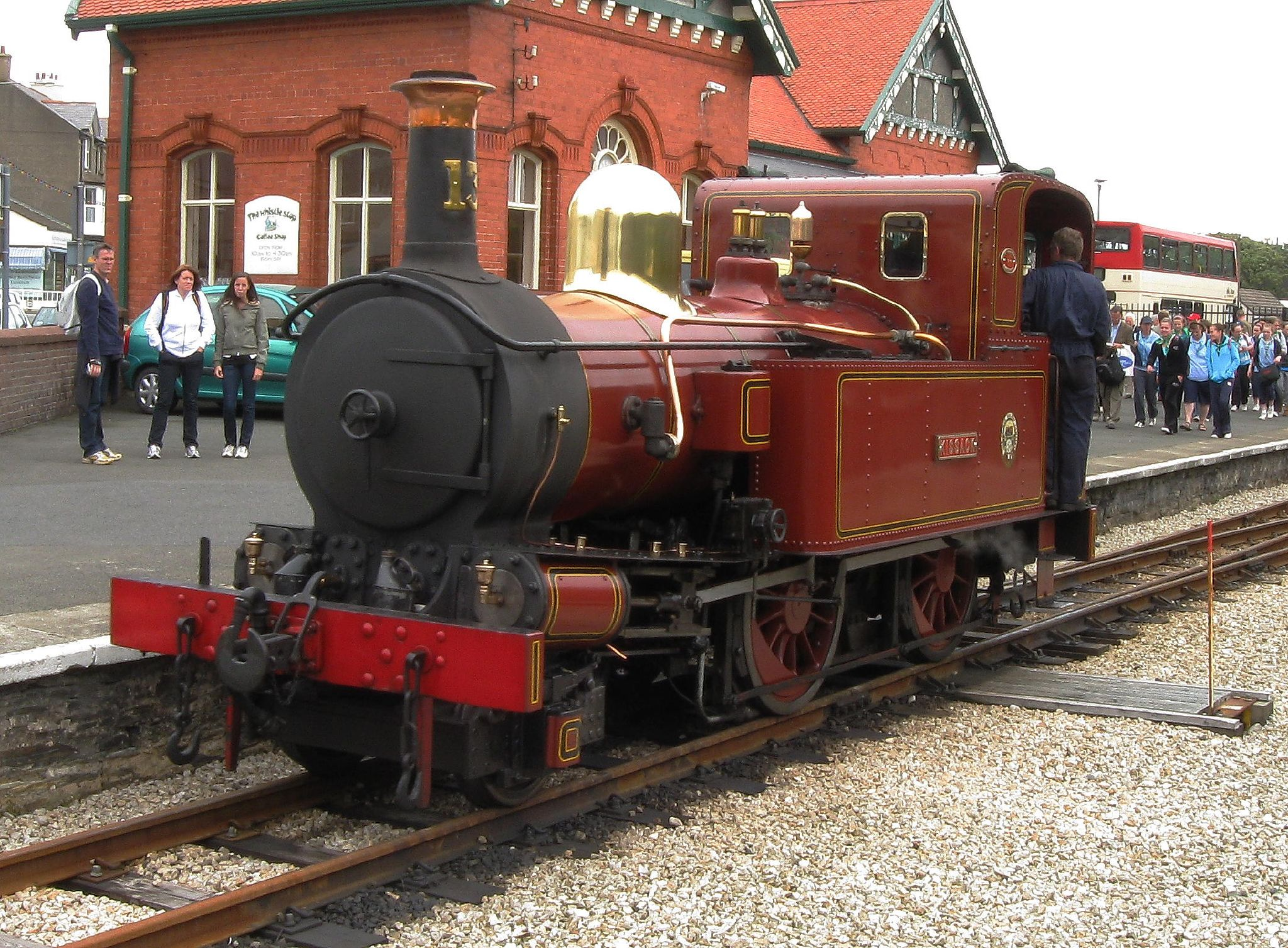
No.13 Kissack fitted with Association-funded injectors at Port Erin Station

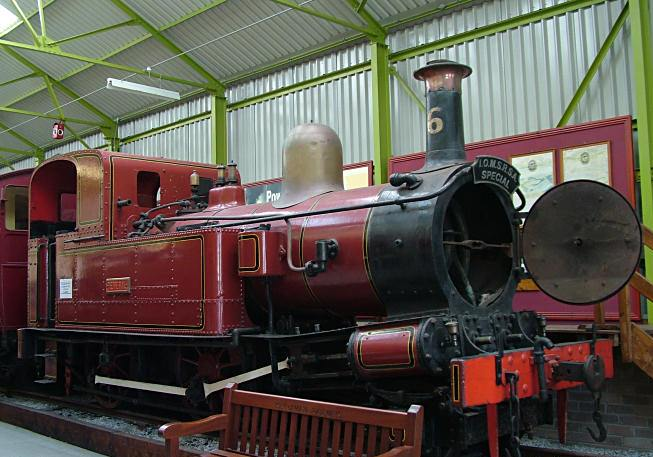
No.6 Peveril which was cosmetically restored by the Association in 1994 and again in 2021

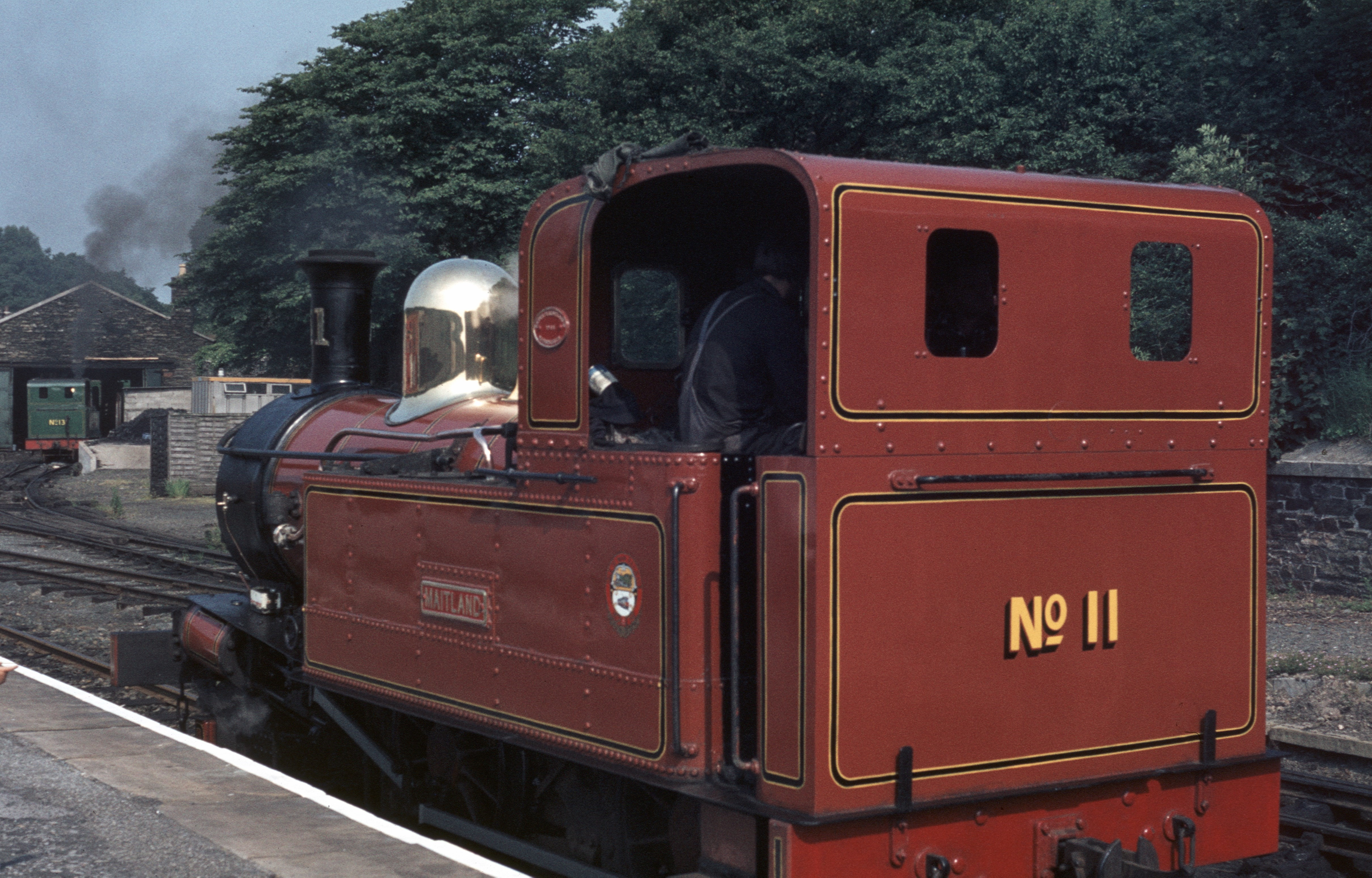
No.11 Maitland 1981 at Douglas Station in 1983 carrying Association-funded boiler tubes

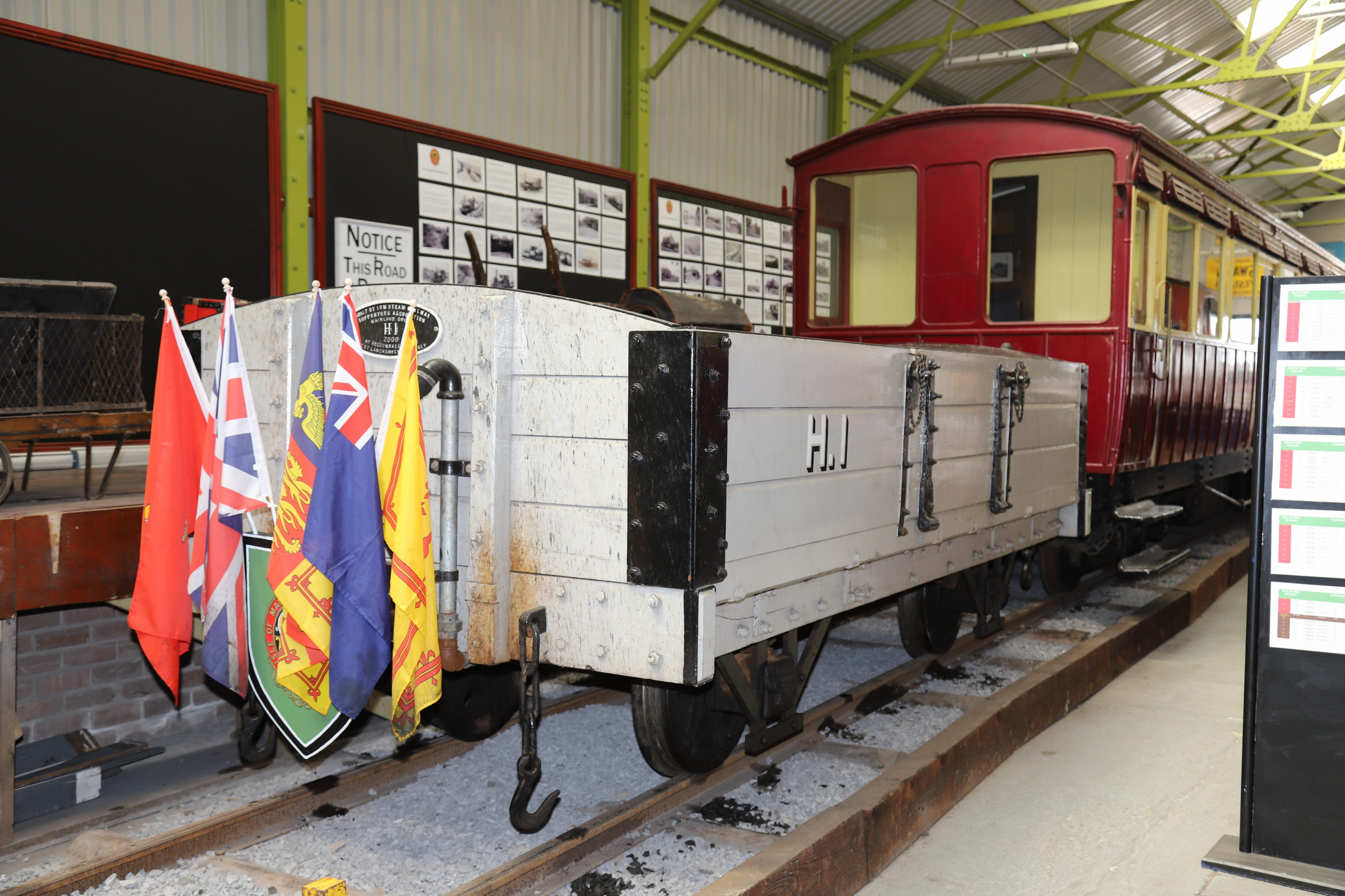
Association-built replica wagon H.1 (with F.36)in the Isle of Man Railway Museum at Port Erin.

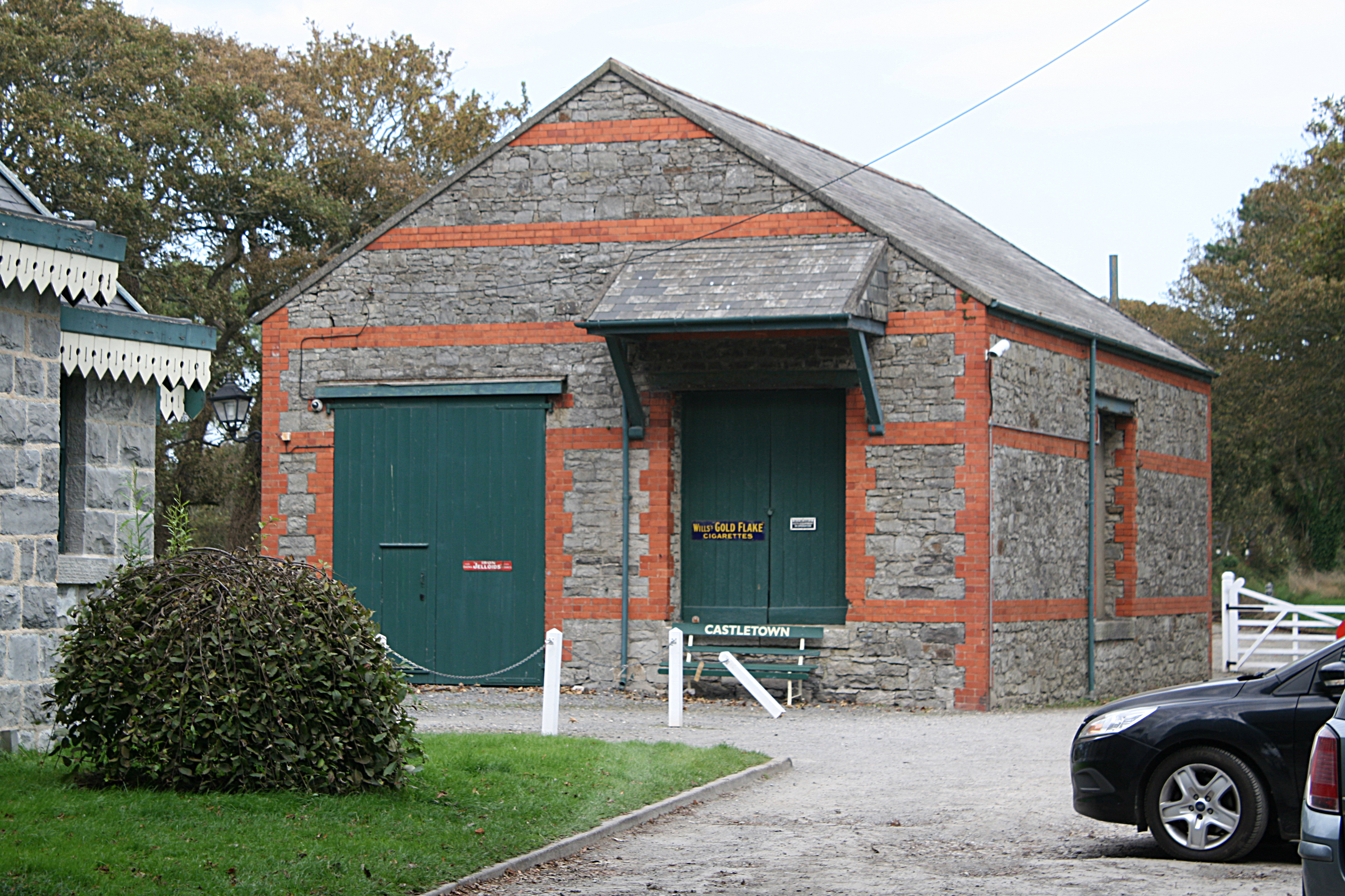
The goods shed at Castletown Station which sees use as a base for Association volunteers in harmony with the Friends Of... group there

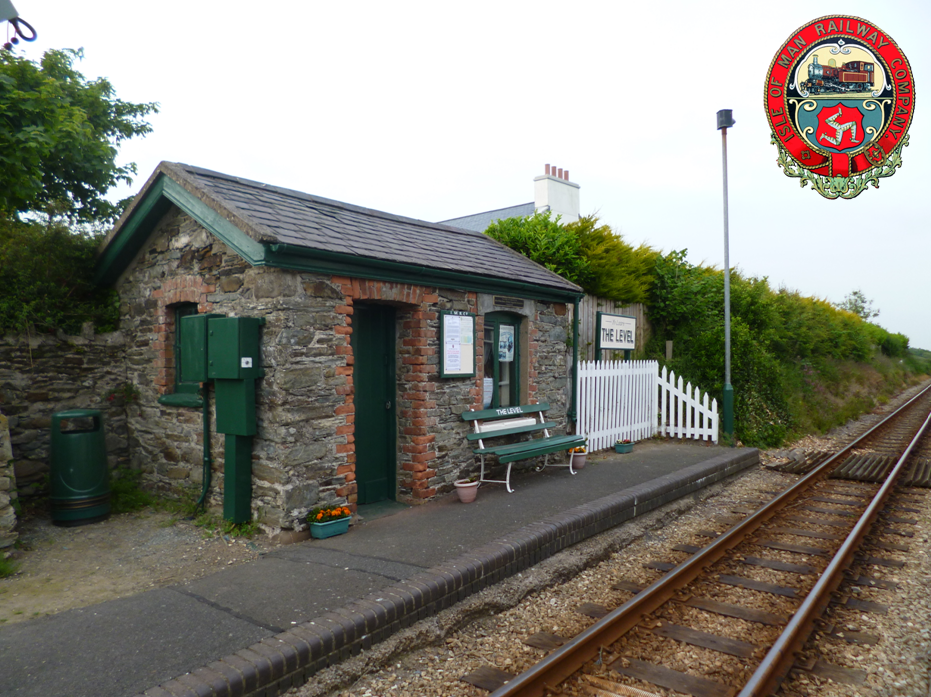
The Level following its first restoration in February 2012, it was later revisited and painted into maroon

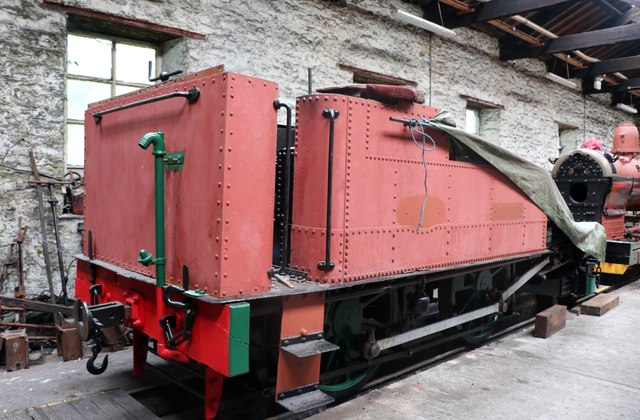
No.9 Douglas during cosmetic restoration in the Douglas Station workshops complex

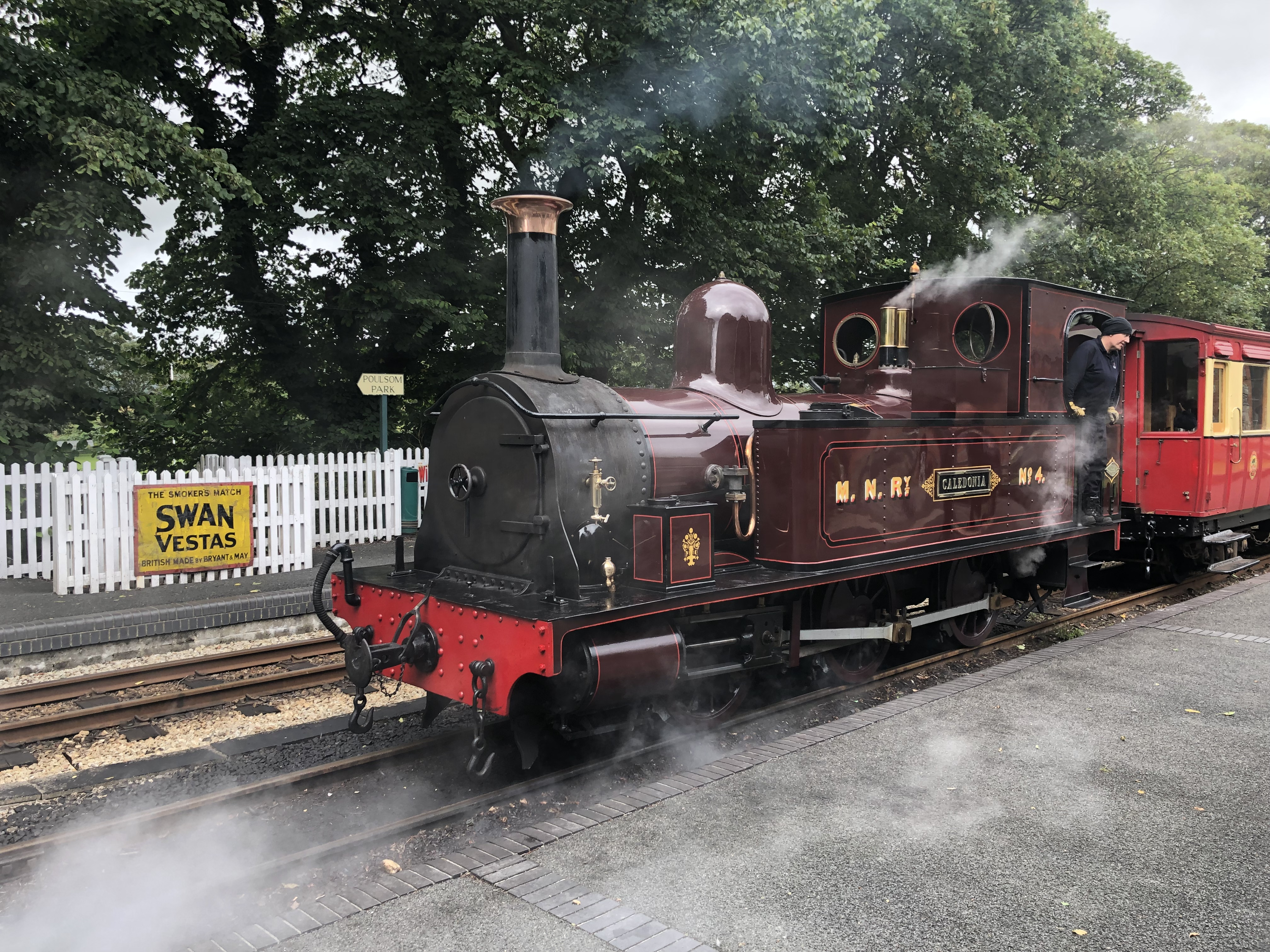
M.N.Ry. No.4 Caledonia at Castletown Station with water tanks which were donated as a project

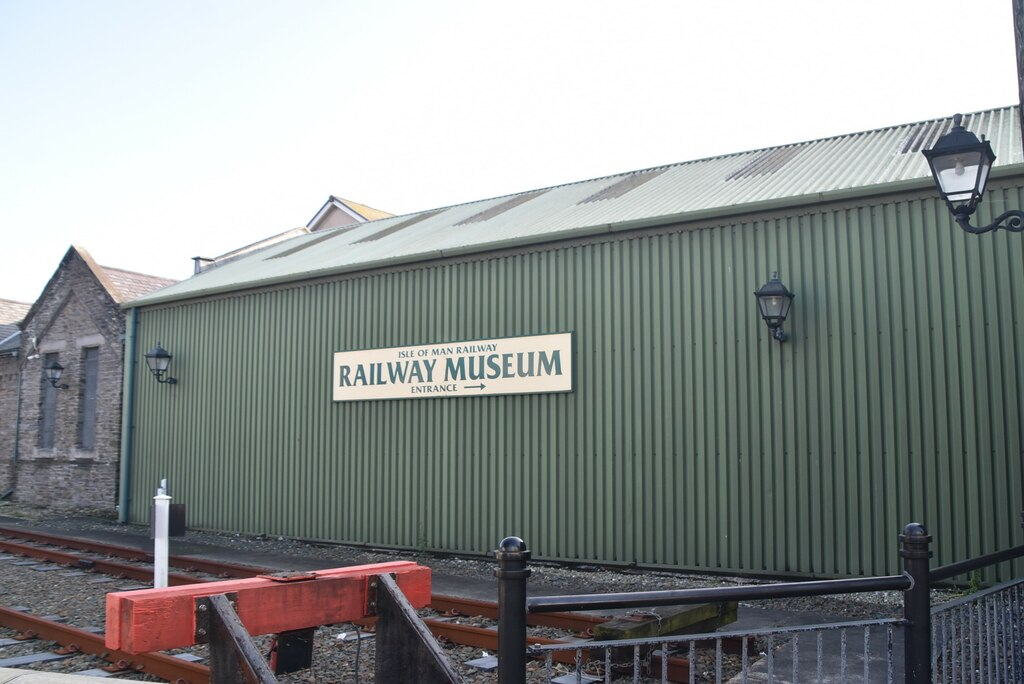
Isle of Man Railway Museum which the Association continues to have an active involvement with

Year	Tasks	Recipient	Notes
1967	Cosmetic Restoration	No.1, No.6 & No.14	Displayed St. John's Station
1968	Cosmetic; Restoration	No.5 & No.15	Displayed St. John's Station
1969	Cosmetic; Restoration	No.3 & No.9	Displayed Douglas Station
1969	Volunteer; Gatekeepers	The South Line	Through until the 1975 season
1975	Cosmetic; Restoration	No.16 Mannin	Displayed Isle of Man Railway Museum
1981	Restoration; Operation	Groudle Glen Railway	Standalone company since 2012
1981	Supply New; Boiler Tubes	No.11 Maitland	Completed, returned to service
1994	Cosmetic; Restoration	No.6 Peveril	Displayed Isle of Man Railway Museum
1994	Fund New; Water Tanks	No.15 Caledonia	Returned to regular operation
1997	Complete; Restoration	Drop-Side M.78	Returned to periodic operation/display
2000	Un-Loch; Your Cash	No.4 Loch	New boiler and returned to regular operation
2000	Replica; Fabrication	Three-Plank H.1	Returned to periodic operation/display
2002	New Water; Injectors	No.4 Loch	Fitted and now in regular operation
2003	New Water; Injectors	No.13 Kissack	Fitted and now in regular operation
2006	New; Steam Turret	No.15 Caledonia	Fitted and now in regular operation
2009	Travellers'; Companion	Guide Book	Stocked in all retail outlets
2010	Fund New; Injectors	No.4 Loch	Fitted and now in regular operation
2012	New Seat; Moquette	Saloon F.29	Fitted and back into regular operation
2012	Slotted; Post Signal	Castletown Station	Erected and remains in regular operation
2013	Restoration; Work	The Level	Completed and regular maintenance since
2013	Restoration; Work	Four Roads	Completed and regular maintenance since
2016	Running-In; Board	Union Mills Station	Completed and regular maintenance since
2016	Running-In; Board	Peel Station	Completed and regular maintenance since
2017	Complete; Restoration	Mill Road Lodge	Completed and regular maintenance since
2023	Complete; Restoration	Closed Van G.1	Completed and returned to periodic use
2018-	Volunteer; Manning	Ballasalla Station	Regularly manned and maintained since
2020	Second; Restoration	The Level	Completed and regular maintenance since
2020	Restoration; Work	Ballabeg Station	Completed and regular maintenance since
2021	Restoration; Work	Ballasalla Gatehouse	Structure also on protecting buildings register
2022	Purchase; Nameplates	No.5 Mona	Completed and fitted to restored locomotive
2021	Cosmetic; Restoration	No.6 Peveril	Revisiting original 1994 project
2023	Cosmetic; Restoration	No.5 Mona	Completed and launched for transport festival
2024	Cosmetic; Restoration	No.9 Douglas	Completed and launched for transport festival
2024	Purchase; Nameplates	No.9 Douglas	Completed and fitted to restored locomotive
2024	Running-In; Board	Peel Road Station	Completed and regular maintenance since
2024	Securing; Repatriation	Carriage F.37	Returned to railway for restoration
2025	Purchase & Restore	Carriage F.6	Full restoration ongoing
2023	Cosmetic; Restoration	No.9 Douglas	Completed and unveiled July 2025
2026	Running-In; Board	Ballaugh Station	Pending consideration and funding
2023	Anniversary; Displays	No.1 Sutherland	Completed
2026	Running-In; Boards	St. John's Station	Pending consideration and funding
2023	Platform; Furniture	Various Stations	Phase one completed, second batch pending
2023	Carriage; Repatriation	M.N.Ry. No.3	Appeal launched and pending funding/agreement
2025	Carriage; Restoration	Carriage F.6	Appeal launched and work commenced
2026	Running-In; Board	Foxdale Station	Pending consideration and funding
2026	Restoration & Display	Crane "No.4"	Pending completion and installation
2024	Information; Panels	Various Stations	Santon Station, Ballasalla Station,Ballabeg Station, The Level and Port St. Mary Station
2026	Cattle; Dock	Castletown Station	Installed and completed for affiliated Friends Of... volunteer group

== Groudle Glen Railway ==
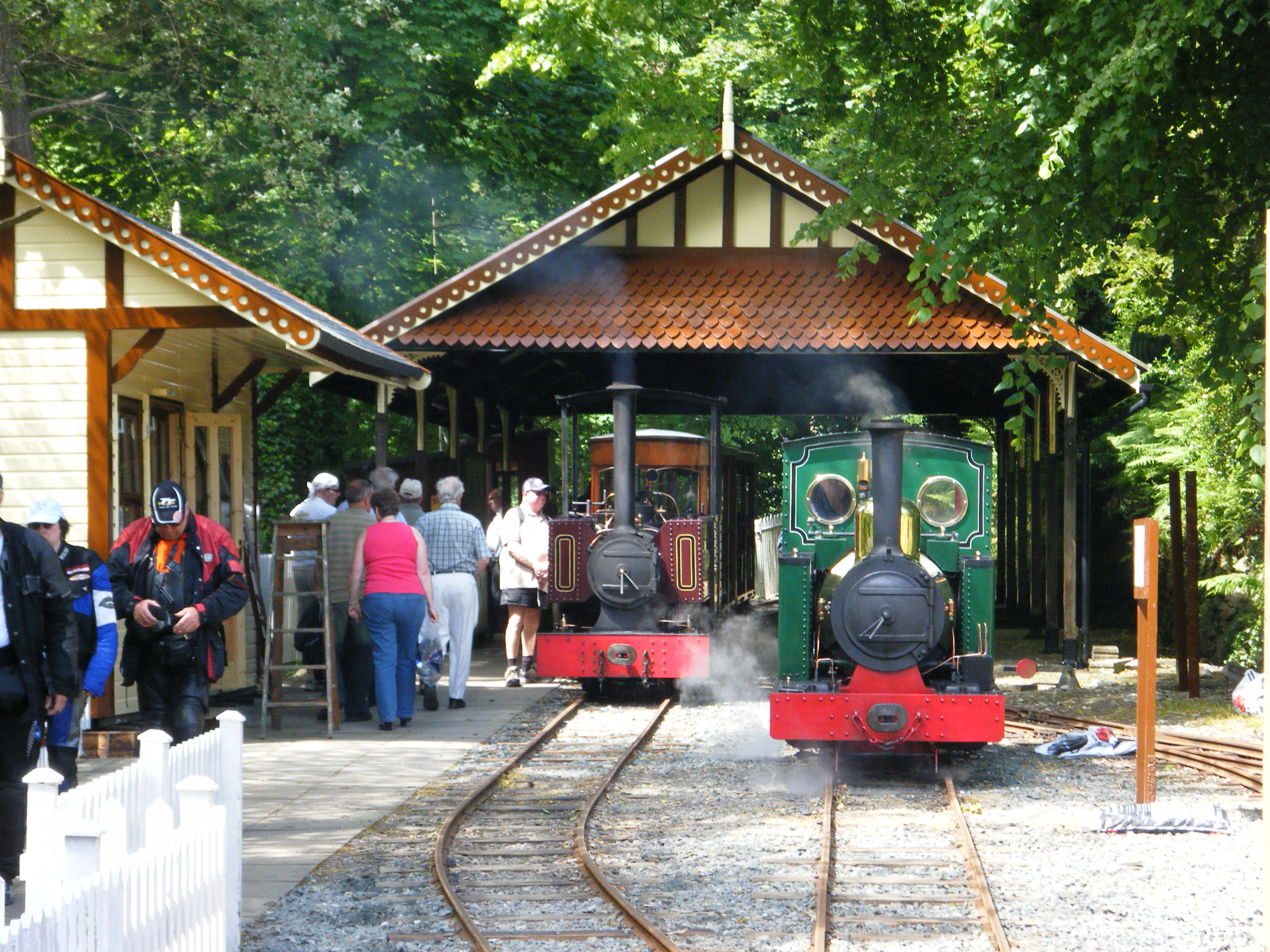
Lhen Coan Station on the Groudle Glen Railway with original locomotive Sea Lion in 2009; this railway was restored and owned by the Association between 1982 and 2009 when it became an independent organisation.

Since the nationalisation of the Isle of Man Railway secured its future, the main thrust of the group has been the restoration of the Groudle Glen Railway, commencing in 1982, and the line continues today. The line had been reduced to a footpath, but the line was relaid to its full length for the first time since 1939, and it was officially opened in 1992. The original steam locomotive Sea Lion returned to service in 1987. Various replica station buildings were built, starting with the station canopy in 1993, and the improvement of the line as one of the island's tourist attractions has continued; this has included the added attraction of visiting steam locomotives, gala days in conjunction with Isle of Man Heritage Railways and popular off-season events such as Santa Trains at Christmas and Bunny Trains each Easter weekend. In more recent times there have also been Jester Express days and promotions in connection with Father's Day. Operations on New Year's Day were introduced in 2011. Additionally, Driver Experience Days are also offered: members of the public can pay to spend the day on the footplate of a steam locomotive and drive trains. The railway is now a stand-alone charity and operates seasonally, whilst the volunteers of the Supporters' Association continue to maintain strong ties with the Isle of Man Railway albeit in a watchdog role, and provision of project items. The group maintains a strong working relationship with the management and attends regular meetings to ensure the development.

== Area Groups ==
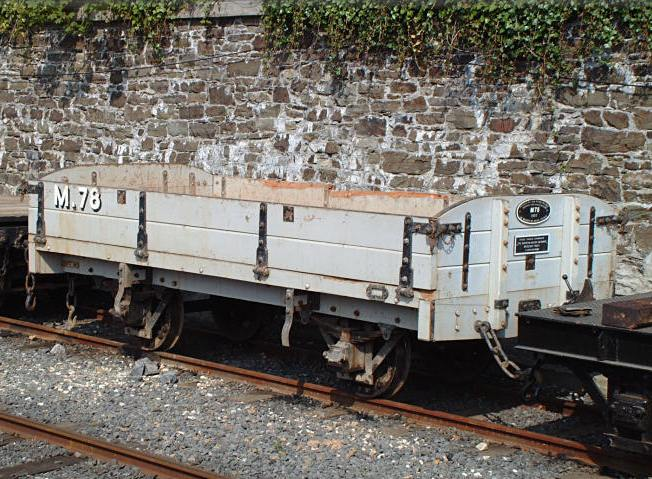
Restored drop-side wagon M.78 in a siding at Douglas Station; this was restored by the Association Mainland Group in 1998 and remains in regular use on photographic charters and mixed trains during events, when not displayed in the Isle of Man Railway Museum

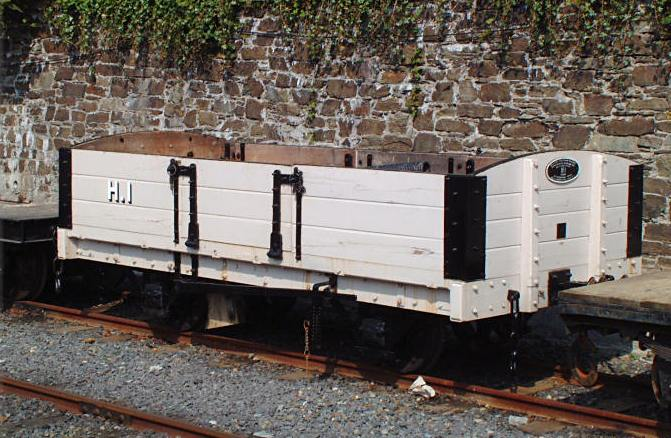
Replica three-plank wagon H.1 at Douglas Station; this was built in 2000 by the Association's Mainland Group utilising a small number of remaining components. When not used it is displayed in the Isle of Man Railway Museum with several other examples of historical rolling stock.

At the time the group was formed there was much support for the retention of the railway both on and off the island and area groups quickly sprouted up across the country, with members of the island committee regularly travelling to meetings on the mainland to provide updates, slide shows, film shows and get-togethers. Groups existed in Greater London, Manchester, Liverpool/Merseyside, Northern Ireland and the Midlands at one time or another but latterly, there was just one, the "Mainland Area Group". It was this group that were responsible for the building of two wagons for the railway. The "M" class of wagon numbered nearly 80 and were part of the Isle of Man Railway's stock of goods vehicles; by the time of nationalisation of the line in 1978 when the Isle of Man Government took responsibility, there were very few examples left in existence; one (numbered M.70) had been left to rot for many years and was resident in a siding at Santon station for many years. It was this vehicle that was used as a template for a project undertaken by the Isle of Man Steam Railway Supporters' Association in 1997, resulting in the presentation to the railway of M.78. This wagon is now part of the railway's historic fleet of vehicles and bears plaques denoting its origins. Together with H.1 (the next project by the group) these two wagons now form the Troublesome Trucks for the Friends of Thomas weekend that takes place on the railway annually.

The "H" class of wagon were part of the goods fleet of the Isle of Man Railway and consisted of a four-wheel two-plank construction; these had all been scrapped by the time the railway was nationalised in 1978 but in 1999 the Isle of Man Steam Railway Supporters' Association took on the ambitious task of building one of these vehicles from scratch. Through a fund-raising campaign this was achieved and the wagon is now part of the rolling stock of the railing and has been numbered "H.1", being the re-used number of the first vehicle of the class, long since destroyed. This was the second project undertaken by the supporters, the first being the building of a similar vehicle M.78. By the year 2000 the area groups had dwindled down to a few members, too far scattered in location to warrant regular meetings and was disbanded.

The possibility of reforming one of the area groups has been mooted in the past, primarily so a group of enthusiasts may take a more hands-on approach on the railway to further make advantage of the good working relationship that the group now has with the railway's management; a number of possible ideas have been floated and it is hoped that a group of volunteers may one day be allowed to have an active role on the railway once again, as it did in the early years of the association's existence. 2010 saw a return to volunteering when, as part of the railway's Rush Hour event over the May Holiday Weekend, members staffed the signal box at Douglas and provided guides for tours of the railway's workshops and running sheds for the first time in a number of years.

== Manx Steam Railway News ==
Since its inception in 1966, the Supporters' Association has produced a members' newsletter, initially a foolscap sheet, later expanded into the journal Steam Railway News which contains news, views, historical articles and photographs. Initially this was produced on a small scale to limited circulation and took the form of a foolscap-sized newsletter but the format was changed to an A5 sized booklet early on which is the format it maintains today. The prefix "Manx" was added in 1985 after a national magazine adopted the magazine's original title. Apart from a spell in the 1980s and 1990s when it was produced and edited on the mainland, the magazine is produced entirely on the island and reaches a membership of approximately 1,000 usually four times a year but the fact that it is entirely prepared by volunteers can mean that the number of issues per annum fluctuates. Members and non-members alike may contribute articles and photographic material for reproduction within the pages of the journal.

In 1992 the magazine celebrated its one-hundredth issue with a colour cover, something which had only been seen three times previously, one of those being for the centenary of the railway in 1973. Since 2002 the outer covers of the magazine have been in full colour for each issue whilst internal photographs and images remain in black and white. The advent of the Supporters' Association official website in late 2008 has meant that news can be more readily distributed but as a great number of members do not have internet access, the news is primarily still delivered via the journal, with more general articles appearing on the website, and announcements. The website also serves as an online archive for historical documents from the railway's history and is expanded at regular intervals to include newly discovered documents as well as photographs and contemporary articles on its subject matter. From 2009 the quality of production of Manx Steam Railway News was improved with a greater number of colour photographs and images in each issue, and the upgrading of paper quality which also enhances photographic reproduction.

2026 marked the diamond jubilee of the group as well as the 200th edition of Manx Steam Railway News and to mark these two milestones the special edition was released featuring the cover title with a gilt effect, and the release of The 1966 Almanac, a glossy A4 publication using extracts from early editions as well as colour photography to chart the events of the first year of the group when the railway was closed, seemingly for good. It is the intention to publish this on an annual basis covering one year at a time extracting information from back issues with the benefit of modern printing allowing for expanded photographic reproduction. Work on a second volume covering the year 1967 commenced upon publication of the first booklet.

== See also ==
- Isle of Man Railway
- Isle of Man Railway locomotives
- Isle of Man Railway rolling stock
- Manx Northern Railway
- Foxdale Railway
- Groudle Glen Railway
