= Ballabeg station =

Railway station in Isle of Man, United Kingdom

Ballabeg Railway Station Stashoon Raad-Yiarn Valley Beg
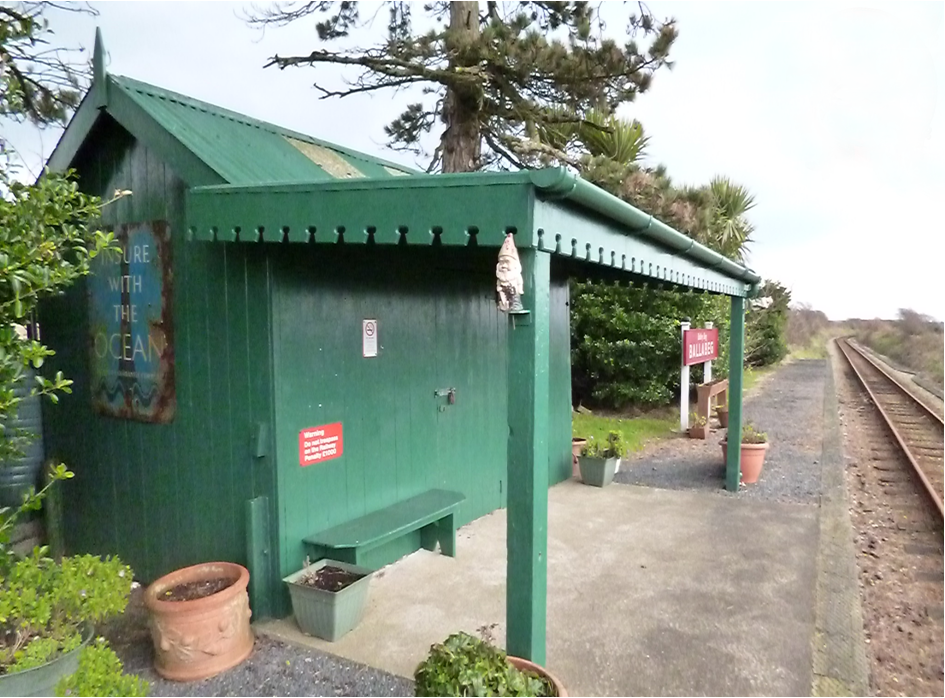

General information
- Location: Colby Road, Malew, Isle of Man, IM9 2FW.
- Coordinates: 54°05′28″N 4°40′26″W
- System: The Isle of Man Railway Co., Ltd.
- Owner: Isle of Man Government; Department of Infrastructure
- Lines: Port Erin (South) Line; Between Douglas & Port Erin
- Platforms: One, Raised; Half-Height
- Tracks: One Running Lines; No Loop / Sidings

Construction
- Structure type: Platelayers' Hut

Other information
- Status: Unstaffed / Request Stop

History
- Opened: 23 July 1877
- Closed: Seasonally (Since 1965)
- Rebuilt: 1944 / 1987
Location

Ballabeg Railway Station (Manx: Stashoon Raad Yiarn Valley Beg) is a diminutive request stop near the village of Ballabeg in the south of the Isle of Man, on the island's steam railway, the sole remaining section of the former network which covered 46 miles across the island. There is another station with the same name, but serving a different village, on the Manx Electric Railway to the north.

== Location ==
Location on the Isle of Man

The station is located on the A28 road about half a mile (0.8 km) south of the village of Ballabeg in the parish of Arbory. This road is part of the Billown Racing Circuit where the Southern 100 races take place each July; the circuit is also used for the Pre-T.T. Classic races in May. The station ceased to be staffed many years ago. Ballabeg has remained on the timetable for many years, but only as a request stop. The station is used for spectators to access these races and is also a popular drop-off point for the annual Laa Columb Killey (St Columba's Day) festival which takes place in a nearby field each summer.

== Buildings ==
=== Original ===
The station is served seasonally by the Isle of Man Railway; other nearby stations are Castletown to the southeast and Colby to the west. The original station building here, installed in 1877, was a more elaborate affair: it was similar in appearance to third class timber buildings at other stations along the line although smaller in size but still with a station master and other platform staff. The date this building was removed is unknown, but the replacement hut has been on the site for many years. The first structure featured staff accommodation, waiting room ladies room and a later lean-to toilet block at the rear and was located closer to the roadway than the current version.

=== Replacement ===
The earliest evidence of the current structure is in a 1946 photograph. There was originally a track works permanent way hut, which remains locked, but a small lean-to canopy was added in 1987 as well as a concrete platform area and the station became one of the most popular for lineside photographers. The site was further improved in 2001-2002 when a pumping station for the all-island sewer network was installed at the rear of the station (known as Ballanorris): vehicular access was improved and a platform to fit three coaches was added, in the form of a wall of sleepers which has been back-filled to provide a half-height platform for alighting and boarding passengers.

== Volunteers ==
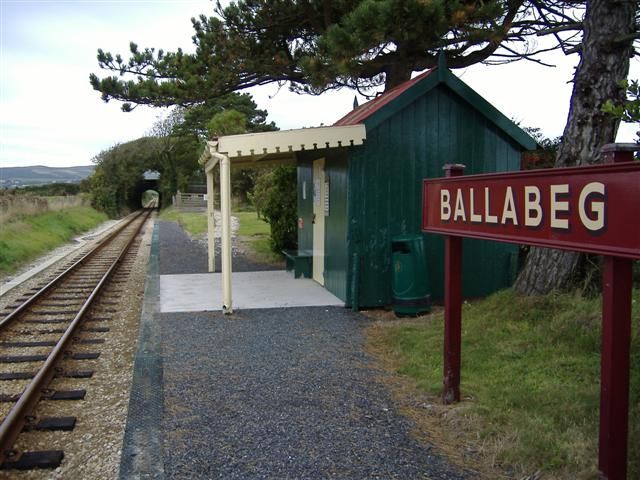
The station with its decorative veranda looking southwest in 2005 prior to restoration works by the Friends Of... group

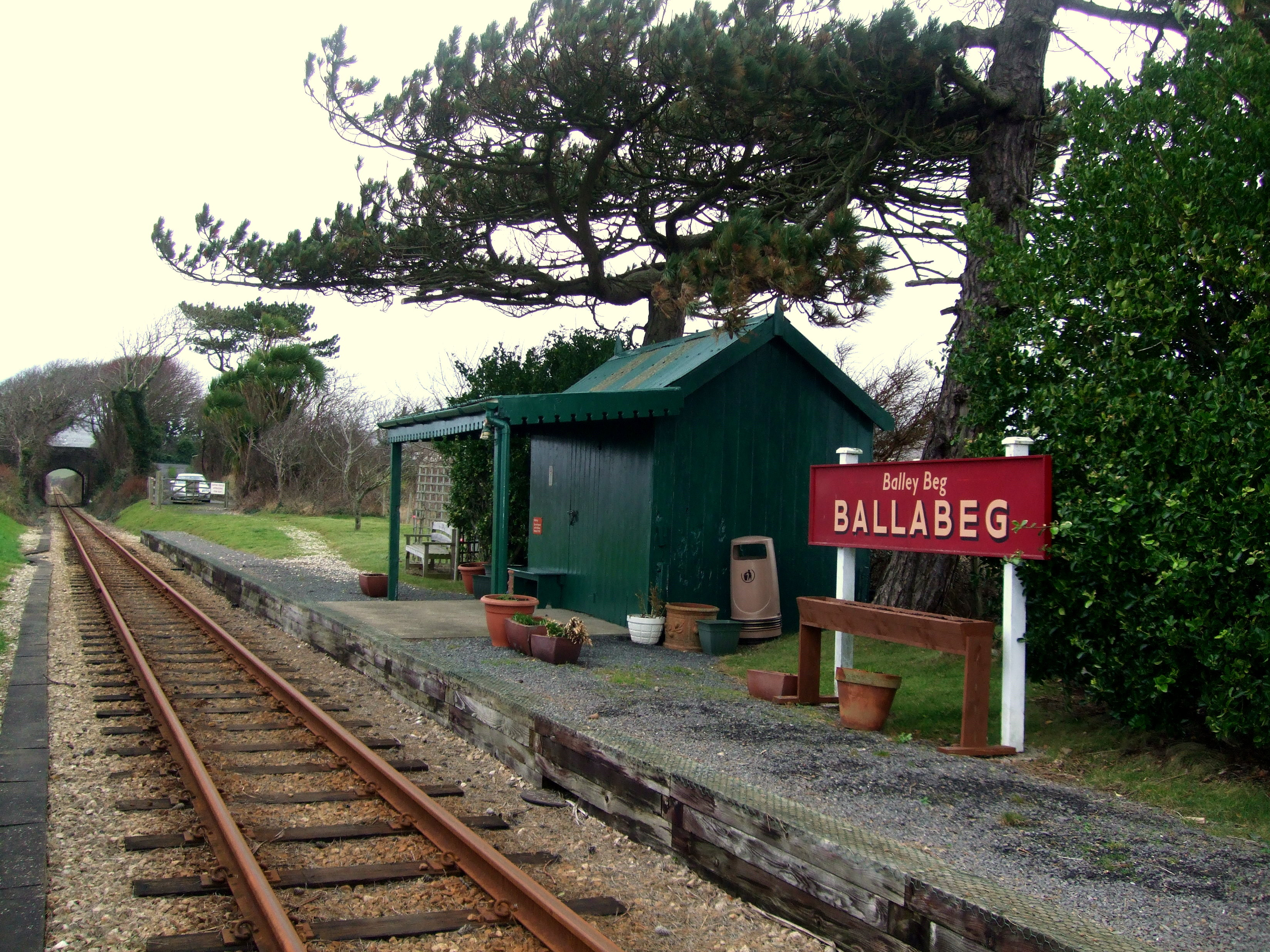
Out of season in December 2011 showing the half-height platform with its sleeper wall edging

=== Women's Institute ===
For several years floral decorations have been provided and upkept by the Arbory Women's Institute, work which continues today in conjunction with the Isle of Man Steam Railway Supporters' Association

=== Friends Of... (1992-1998) ===
In more recent times since the 1990s, the station was tended to by local supporters who added flower baskets, old-fashioned advertising signs and the like, making it one of the most picturesque yet tranquil stations on the line. A blackboard was put in place and cheerful notes regularly updated on it for the passing traveller to observe but this practice has latterly stopped. The station carries bilingual station name boards in keeping with policy, and these were installed in 2008; it remains a request stop only: passengers wishing to board trains here must give a clear hand signal to the driver and those wishing to alight must inform the guard prior to departure from the previous station. There remained until 2016 in situ an "Isle of Man Ferry Express" container which was cosmetically restored by local enthusiasts. This was used on the railway in the 1960s in an unsuccessful attempt to introduce freight traffic to the line but was removed being in a parlous state.

=== Renovations (2021-2024) ===
Volunteers from the Isle of Man Steam Railway Supporters' Association undertook renovation works at the station during the summer of 2021 which included the provision of traditional concrete railway planters, restored platform furniture complete with station name, litter bins and a repaint of the former platelayers' hut from green into royal maroon to make the structure stand out from the surrounding greenery; two short sections of picket fencing were also erected to further define the platform area which will be continued as funding allows; a replacement running in board will also be added to complete the project.

== Route ==
Preceding station	Isle of Man Railway	Following station
Colby	Port Erin Line	Castletown

== See also ==
- Isle of Man Railway stations
- Isle of Man Steam Railway Supporters' Association
- Ballabeg
