= Ballasalla railway station =

Railway station in the Isle of Man

Ballasalla Railway Station Stashoon Raad-Yiarn Valley Sallagh
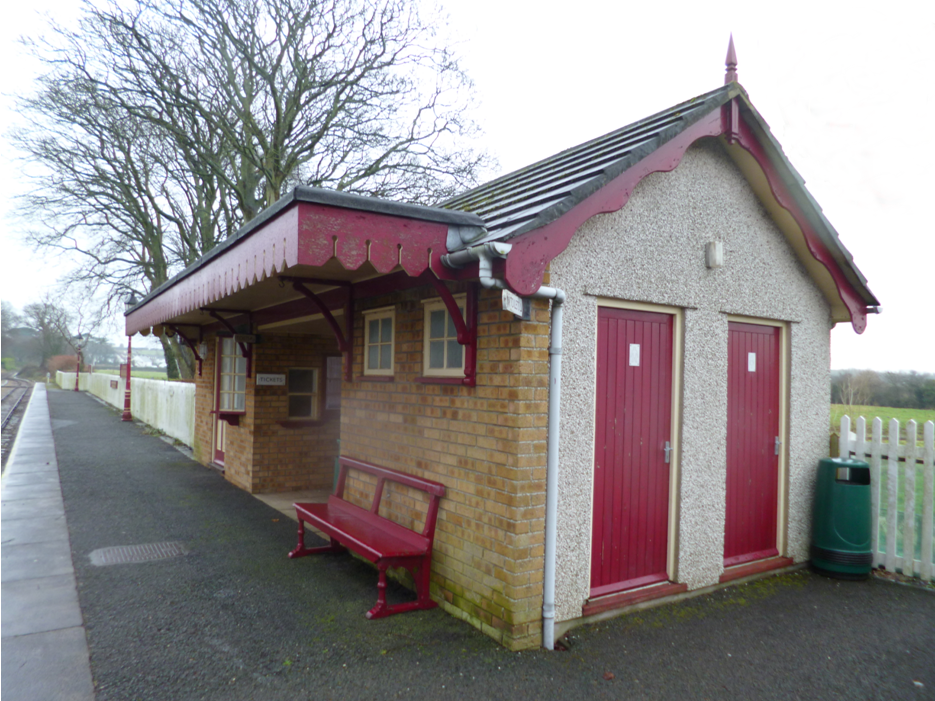

General information
- Location: Railway Terrace, Station Road, Ballasalla, Isle of Man, IM9 2FR.
- Coordinates: 54°05′46″N 4°37′49″W
- System: The Isle of Man Railway Co., Ltd.
- Owner: Isle of Man Government; Department of Infrastructure
- Lines: Port Erin (South) Line (Between Douglas & Port Erin)
- Platforms: Two, Raised (Full Height, One Disused); One Goods (Disused)
- Tracks: Two Running Lines; Goods Siding (Disused)

Construction
- Structure type: Station, Gatehouse & Water Tower
- Parking: Dedicated, Adjacent

History
- Opened: 1 August 1874
- Rebuilt: 1901 / 1962 / 1985

Passengers
- Passenger Only since 1965, previously Goods, Livestock & Freight

Services
Patrons' Toilets, Sheltered Waiting Areas, Raised Platforms, Information Displays
Location

Ballasalla Railway Station (Manx: Stashoon Raad Yiarn Valley Sallagh) is located in the village of Ballasalla in the south of the Isle of Man, close to the airport, and is served on a seasonal basis by the Isle of Man Railway. It forms part of the sole remaining section of the once extensive network (46 miles, 74 km) that operated across the island. Ballasalla was the usual crossing point for trains, making it popular with photographers, until the introduction of the 2015 timetable which saw all trains passing at Castletown.

== Environs ==
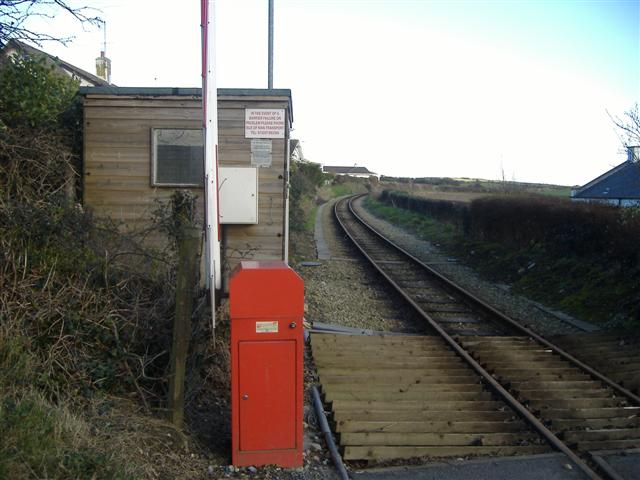
Ballahick Crossing which is about half a mile above the station.

Above the railway station to the west are the crossings serving Ballahick and Ballawoods farms; these were until 2001 staffed by seasonal gatekeepers but the installation of automatic barriers saw this practice discontinued. The office development that adjoins the station was once the extensive goods yard. This was sold off to create developments in 1985, when the original station building dating from 1874 was demolished. A row of local authority housing appears to the south-west of the railway station next to the level crossing keeper's hut; beyond this is the Silverburn Estate, a housing development dating from the late 1960s and early 1970s. Beyond this are the village pub (the Whitestone), a few shops, post office, primary school and a nursing home. In the village are the offices of the local authority, Malew Parish Commissioners. An industrial estate on the site of the nearby Balthane Farm is home to a number of local businesses and also provides access to the runways and a footpath to the beach. The name of the village is from the Manx language Balley Sallagh, "Place of Willow", and there are many willow trees in the surrounding area.

== Today ==
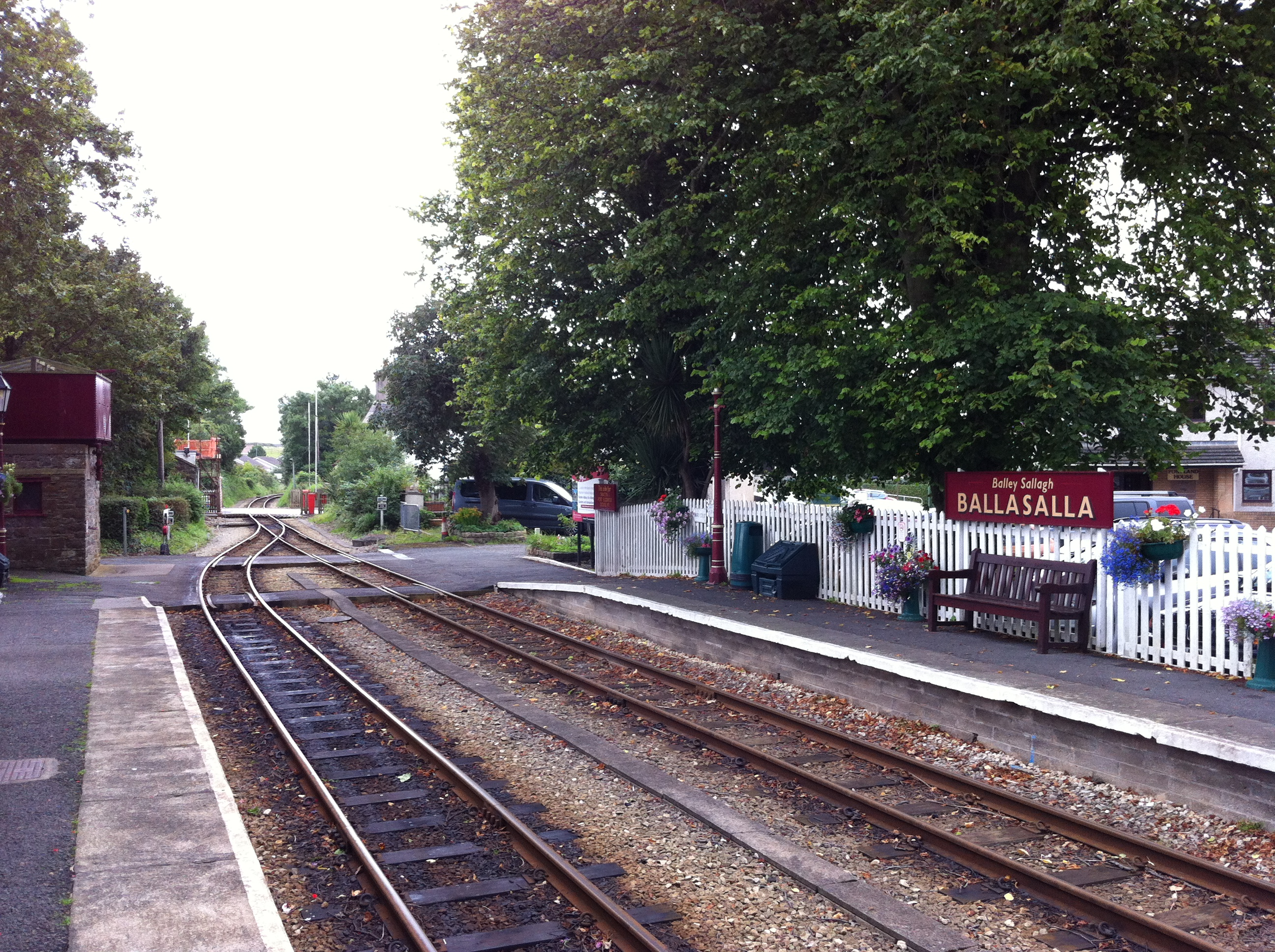
The station as it is today looking towards the main road crossing with the water tower to the left

Although now extensively modernised and not really recognisable as the railway station that existed until 1985, it remains one of the most picturesque settings on the line and was popular with photographers who had the opportunity to take images of two trains at once. From 2001 to 2012 this railway station was the only crossing place in regular use on the line, as after timetable changes in 2001 there were no crossing trains at Castletown Station. However, with the introduction of a more intensive high season timetable in 2012, with six trains each way instead of the usual four, some trains have once again been crossing at Castletown, and all trains from 2015.

== Terminus ==
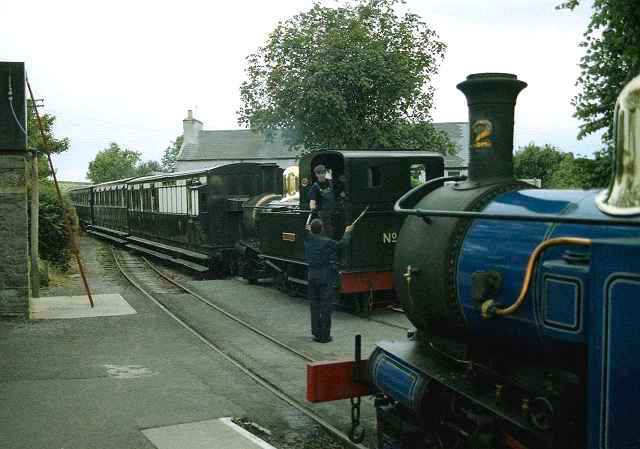
The once familiar scene as No.10 G.H. Wood crosses No.12 Hutchinson at the station in 1998 during the Steam 125 celebrations; this practice ceased in November 2015

Prior to the nationalisation of the railway in 1978, the railway company tried some experiments to reduce expenditure to keep the railway alive. Ballasalla railway station was (for one season only) the terminus of the line: a short run between here and Port Erin was the only service in 1976. The previous year the line was shorter still, only offering travel between Port Erin and Castletown, and it was largely due to campaigning by locals that services extended this far. The Isle of Man Steam Railway Supporters' Association led a campaign to have the line fully reinstated. In 1977 the entire line opened once more, and has remained open ever since on a seasonal basis. Before 1977, many goods trains also terminated here, with the nearby local weekly mart being a busy local event. With the village being surrounded by farms, the mart provided a vital source of income for the railway and the facilities that featured here were a testament to its once bustling location. In 2010 the railway's inaugural Teddy Bears' Picnic special trains were also based here, although train services operated through to Port Erin as normal rather than dedicated trains terminating here. With its run round facilities and water tower, the railway station is occasionally used for special hire services that connect with the local hostelry. Everyday service trains however do not terminate here, but all halt.

== Crossings ==
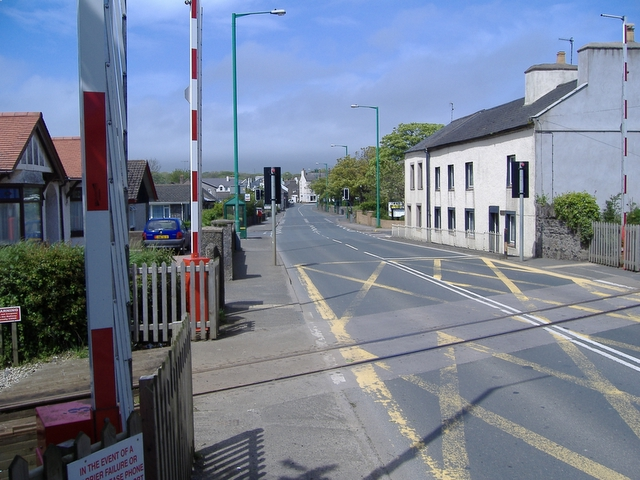
The automated main road crossing in 2003 shortly after installation, replacing mechanical gates; the cottages to the right were occupied by railway porters while that on the left is a replacement for a former staff house

When the railway arrived here the road was little more than a pack-horse road; at its intersection with the railway, traditional level crossing gates were installed. A gatekeeper's house and small lodge were also built; these both still stand: the former is now a private house, whilst the latter remains extant though out of use. It was not until 1962-1963 that the wooden manually operated gates were replaced with larger mechanical gates, and the gatehouse modified to accommodate a "wheelhouse", a small signal box-type structure in a position above the road to increase visibility for the operator. A series of inter-connected rods beneath the road protected by large metal plates were also extant, but when the whole crossing was relaid in 2000 these were removed and a standard concrete crossing installed. These gates were opened and closed by a large ship's wheel structure which remains in situ. These distinctive gates were a feature of the line and survived until 2001 when, in line with a health and safety ruling, they were removed and replaced with automatic barriers which are now operated by the staff from the platform for departing trains and by treadle activated by trains approaching from a southerly direction. The barriers now in operation tower above the site when in the "off" position; they are long enough to block both carriageways when in use. It is also protected by colour lights to warn motorists of approaching trains, and a set of repeater lights on the exit to Silverburn Way further alert motorists approaching from the south.

== Structures ==
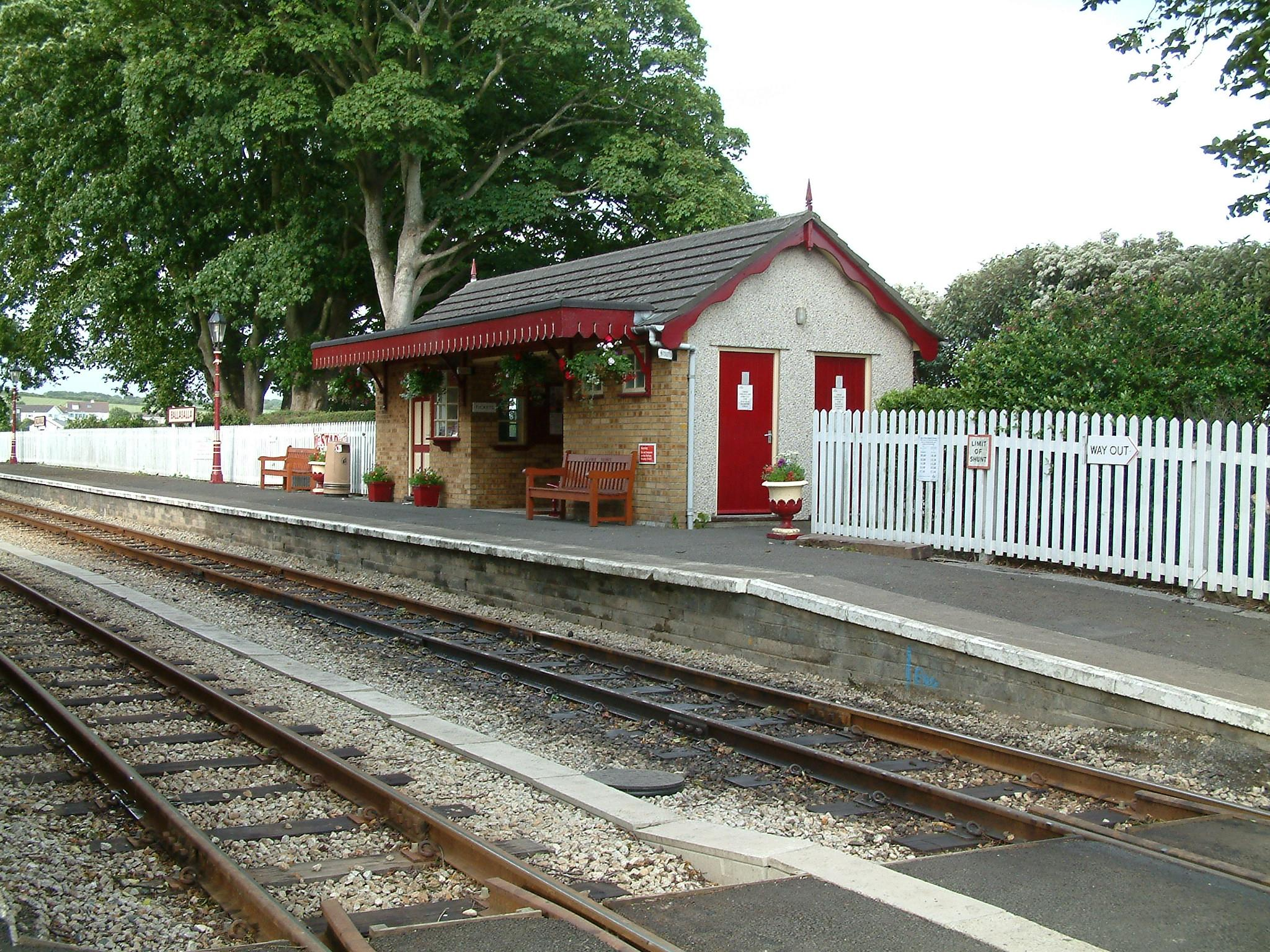
The replacement station which stands on the down platform and bears little resemblance to the original

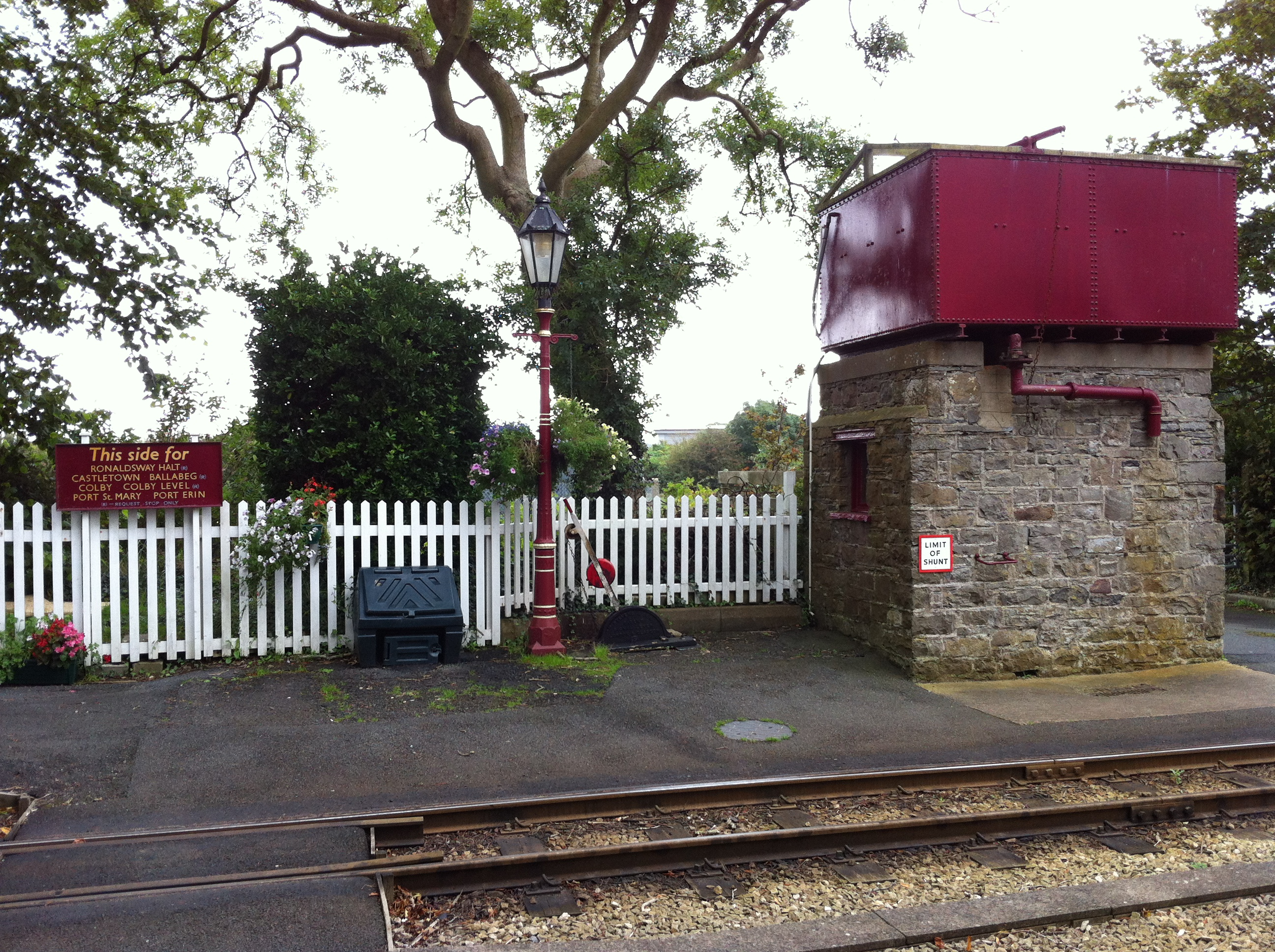
The water tower was erected in 1902 and remains in use today

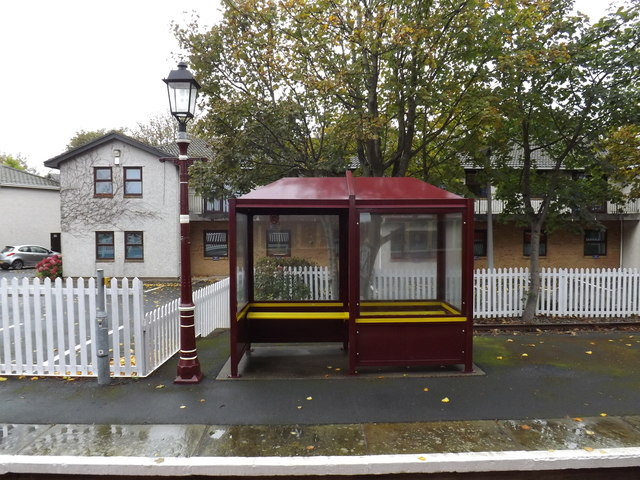
The modern bus shelter on the now disused up platform remains in place although the platform has not been used since November 2015

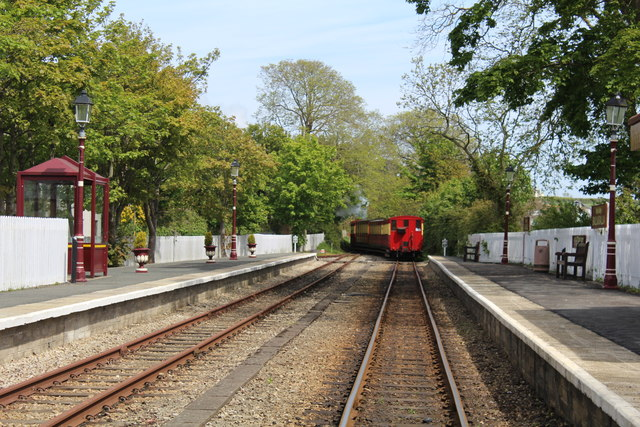
Train departing showing the extended platforms and current arrangement at the station

=== Original Station ===
The original wooden railway station was built in 1874 (to the same design as that still extant at Santon, the next halt eastwards on the line). Being a market village the railway station soon acquired cattle docks and goods platforms. The original building was demolished in 1985 and retained its original appearance until the end, it stood on a site now occupied by approximately six car parking spaces on the up side of the passing loop.

=== Crossing-Keeper's Lodge ===
Built for the opening of the line, this was extensively modified to house the now-defunct mechanical railway station gates in 1963. A crossing-keeper's house on the other side of the road was demolished and replaced with a private dwelling. The lodge remains in place though is now only used for storage.

=== Goods Store ===
There was also a goods shed on the site - a re-used wooden building originally from the prisoner of war camp at Knockaloe near Peel, which was also served by the railway during the First World War. It was used in connection with freight and livestock trains and remained on site until redevelopment commenced in 1985 at which time it was destroyed. Several other structures from the camp were obtained by the railway for re-use.

=== Replacement ===
The original structure was replaced by a brick building housing a small ticket office and waiting area, which was built in 1985 and was opened in 1986 by Jack Nivison, the former President of the Legislative Council of the Isle of Man and Member of the House of Keys for Middle. Before this, the railway station, like several intermediate stopping places on the line, did not provide passenger platforms. The new building, however, was built at platform height, and the platform was long enough for a five-coach train, later increased to seven.

=== Water Tower ===
The station also boasts a stone-built water tower dating from 1902; from 1979 it carried the station name on its tank in lower case lettering typical of the era, removed for work in 1998 (memorably a tank marked "Dhoon Quarry" substituted for a time) it returned in 1999. It was removed again for work and returned in early 2019. The structure was also placed on the protected buildings register as an item of historical importance around this time.

=== Waiting Shelter ===
A modern bus shelter was installed on the up platform in 2002 and in an attempt to make it blend with the environment was painted maroon rather than the standard green of other such edifices; it has been redundant since trains ceased to call at the up platform following the close of the 2015 season but remains in situ, prone to vandalism attacks and has had its glazed panels smashed and replaced on several occasions rather than simply removing it.

=== Extended Platform ===
In 2001 an up platform at full height was established for the first time; platform edging slabs used had previously been employed for the former South Line departure roads at Douglas Station and was retained for future use when lifted in 1979. At the same time the down platform was extended to accommodate six carriages, the newer portion being narrower than the original. In 2002 the opposite side of the line also received a full-length platform, which also serves the goods siding.

== Silverdale ==
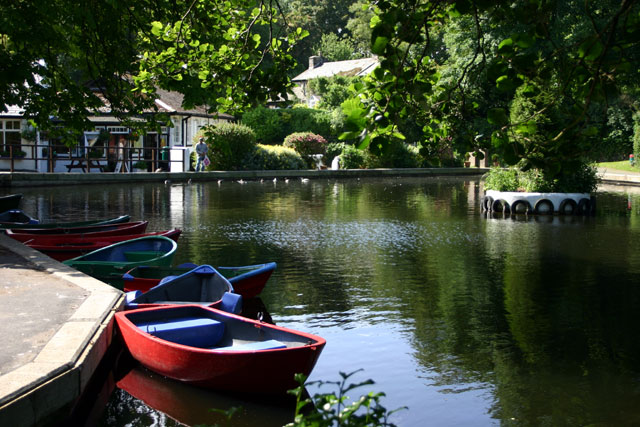
Silverdale boating lake which is located a distance from the station and is a popular destination for alighting passengers in summer months

This station serves the local attraction of Silverdale Glen, a small pleasure park with its own boating pool and water-powered merry-go-round with refreshment rooms. This is a 15-minute walk from the railway station and was once very popular, making the railway station busy. The attraction is open throughout the year and is a popular destination for model boat enthusiasts who use the shallow boating lake out of season. In season there are both rowing boats and hand-operated pedal boats, popular for many years. In the past there was also a large indoor model railway layout here, with coin-operated trains. There was also a grotto-type walk-through feature with illuminated gnomes in a forest environment. Today, the café and restaurant are a popular stopping off point. The tree-lined glen that joins the village and the pleasure park has a wishing well and leads directly to the other nearby attraction, part of the Story of Mann located at Rushen Abbey. Some paths in this area form part of the Millennium Way, a long public right of way created in 1979 to celebrate 1000 years of the island's parliament. It climbs beyond this point towards the centre of the island. The boating lake also hosts regular model boating club meetings making it a popular visitor destination in season.

== Rushen Abbey ==
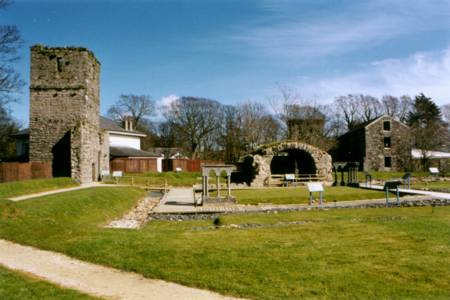
The Rushen Abbey ruin site which is managed by Manx National Heritage and a short walk from the station

The national heritage site at Rushen Abbey is also a short walk from the railway station; once a popular venue for dancing and famed for its cream teas, it later became the Academy nightclub and fell into disrepair before being developed as a major historical attraction. The earliest origins of the site can be dated to the 10th century when Savignac monks from Furness Abbey established a site here, later falling to Cistercian rule when the two orders merged. The nearby abbey church is dedicated to St. Mary but is approximately one hundred years younger than the abbey proper. Dissolved by the 16th century, by the early 19th century the ruins were marketed as a tourist destination served by the railway and famous for the strawberries and cream before the Second World War. After several years in different guises it was bought by Manx National Heritage in 1998 and excavated over the following years. It is now a heritage site and one that is popular with rail travellers when open (between April and October). A small visitors' interpretation centre leads to the abbey gardens where there are interactive displays as well as audio and video material. An area designated for children is also available, where you can build a monks' arch among other activities. The popularity of this attraction is such that signs on the platform alert passengers that it is the correct railway station to alight to visit it. A further large sign in the car park gives details of the directions to the site.

== Friends Of... ==
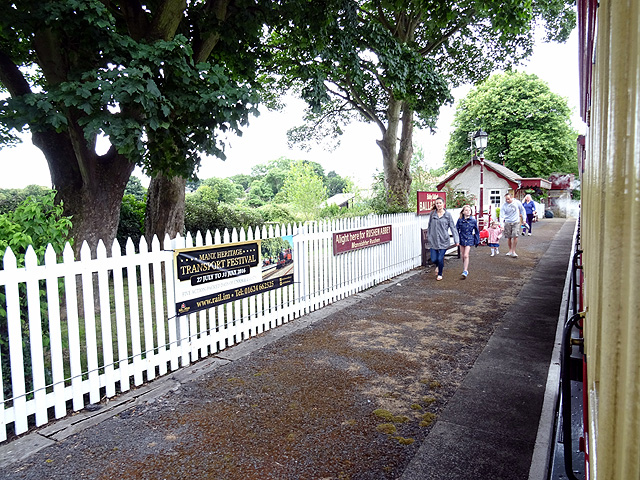
View of the only used platform

In early 2019 a volunteer group was established in conjunction with the Isle of Man Steam Railway Supporters' Association and the local authority Malew Parish Commissioners with a view to adopting the station, tending to the floral displays in the summer months and otherwise enhancing the site. The intention to follow the precedent set by the Friends Of.. Castletown Station with working parties on site regularly as a community scheme similar to those provided elsewhere along the line, it being commented that the general upkeep of the station had deteriorated since it became an unstaffed site. Floral displays have been expanded upon since the group was formed each season and 2021 saw the provision of more period platform furniture to enhance the site as well as more appropriate signage supplied by the Supporters' Association. An art installation was also established in 2022 as well as historical displays. The site is staffed on most operational days by a retired volunteer who sells postcards.

== Routes ==
Preceding station	Isle of Man Railway	Following station
Ronaldsway Halt	Port Erin Line	Santon

== See also ==
- Isle of Man Railway stations
- Isle of Man Railway level crossings and points of interest
- Isle of Man Steam Railway Supporters' Association
- Ballasalla
