= Santon railway station =

Railway stop in Isle of Man, the UK

Santon Railway Station Stashoon Raad-Yiarn Skylley Stondane
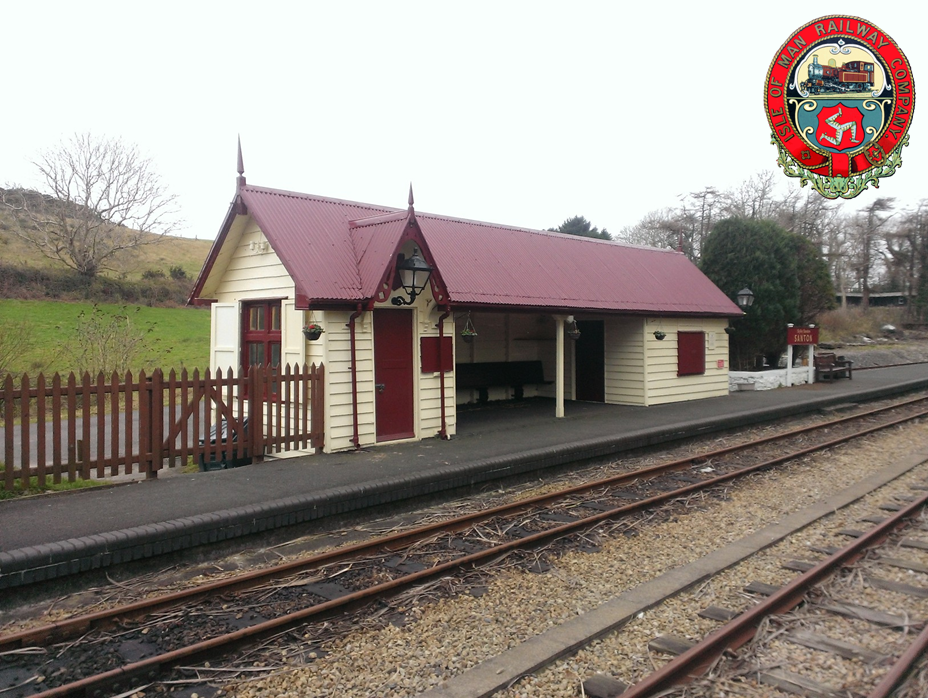

General information
- Location: Off Castletown Road, Santon Newtown, Malew, Isle of Man, IM8 4RR.
- Coordinates: 54.1182°N 4.5841°W
- System: The Isle of Man Railway Co., Ltd.
- Owner: Isle of Man Government; Department of Infrastructure
- Lines: Port Erin (South) Line; Between Douglas & Port Erin
- Platforms: Two, Half-Height Raised; One Bay Siding, Half-Height Raised
- Tracks: Two Running Lines; Bay Siding

History
- Opened: 1 August 1874
- Closed: 1958 (Seasonal Since 1965)

Passengers
- Passenger Only (Since 1965, Goods, Livestock & Freight Previously)

Services
Waiting Shelter - Historical Displays - Seating - Limited Parking
Location

Santon Railway Station (Manx: Stashoon Raad Yiarn Skylley Stondane) is a request stop near Newtown in the parish of Santon, Isle of Man; it forms part of the sole remaining line of the Isle of Man Railway which once encompassed over 46 miles of network and retains its original station building. The halt sometimes plays host to Santa's Grotto each December as part of the railway's Santa Trains service although between 2010 and 2013 it was not utilised for this purpose. The railway station is situated off the A5 Port Erin to Douglas road, between the railway stations of Ballasalla and Port Soderick.

== Naming ==
When the land was surveyed in 1872 for the formation of the railway it was originally intended to call the railway station here (or hereabouts) Ballavale; although the name persisted in many items of paperwork and on plans the railway station has always been known as Santon despite being some distance from the "Newtown" area which is today considered to be the village area.

== Crossings ==
To the north of the railway station the line passes over a road bridge and travels along an embankment; immediately after leaving the railway station environs the line passes under the main Douglas to Ballasalla road and thereafter onto another much larger embankment across the Santon Burn to the occupational crossings of Ballalona and Ballastrang farms. The latter is the sole remaining staffed level crossing and retains its manually operated gates.

== Building ==
The railway station is the last on the line to still boast its original 1874 building; however, similar structures were in place at Port St Mary, replaced 1898; Ballasalla, replaced in 1985 and Colby demolished in 1980. The building is of simple style, being of timber construction with corrugated iron roofing, painted in a cream and red style unchanged since the late 1960s. It includes the station master's accommodation and porters' rooms as well as a passenger waiting shelter recessed from the running lines. In 1985 the railway station building was cosmetically restored at the expense of the now-defunct Isle of Man Railway Society and attention was given to the wooden slatting that forms its exterior walls; a better form of wooden window shutters were also added at this time, the previous incarnations having been somewhat crude affairs. Upon completion of the project a large sign board denoting the improvements was erected over the porters' room window, but this was later removed when the group became defunct. In the intervening years no further remedial work was carried out and the condition of the building deteriorated considerably until it received further attention in 2002 as part of the redevelopment of the railway station when the entire infrastructure of the railway was overhauled. It has had a recent repaint in 2014. Hanging baskets and flowers added plus a bench on platform opposite the railway station building. The railway station is occasionally used for crossing trains during special events as 'Rush Hour' and the annual Santa Trains each December.

== Santa's Halt ==
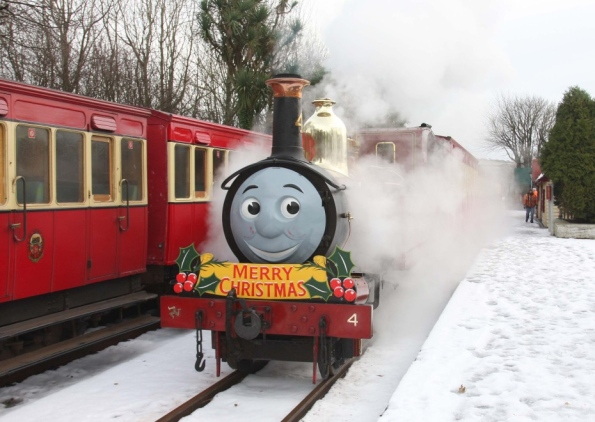
No. 4 Loch at the station during the popular annual Santa Special services in December 2012; the station has been used for many years for these trains

The railway station has played host to Father Christmas and his enchanted grotto for several years from 1986 when the railway's popular Santa Trains terminated here, the railway station being renamed as Santa's Halt annually for this purpose. In more recent years this practice was discontinued and a much shorter run was introduced with Father Christmas passing among the passengers to distribute presents and trains only travelling as far as various points on the first section of the line prior to Port Soderick railway station. In 2008 the full run to Santon was reinstated, and a further two years of these services were provided. The grotto was constructed each December by panelling in the recessed passenger waiting shelter in the railway station building. The railway's three coach Bar Set of saloon coaches were placed in the siding at the railway station for provision of mulled wine, mince pies, tea, coffee and other refreshments and the area suitably decorated; the railway station renamed for the occasion which used to take place in the first two weekends of December. However, in 2010 a considerable revamp of the railway's established seasonal services saw the terminus moved from here to Castletown railway station which was renamed Tinseltown for the occasion, this continued annually until 2013 but the 2014 festive services once again used Santon railway station.

== Parcels & livestock ==
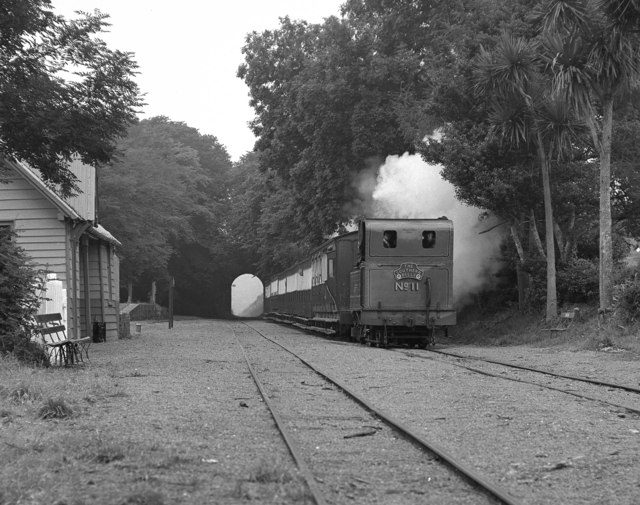
Train entering, the main road bridge in the distance.

For many years the railway station played unofficial host to the railway's lost property; legend has it that once uncollected parcels and such were not claimed after a certain period from any other railway station on the network, they were dispatched here for storage, theoretically awaiting collection; such was the regularity of this occurrence that by the time of its closure in 1958 (it became an unstaffed halt after this time) the covered storage areas were packed full with passengers' unclaimed belongings from floor to ceiling. Situated as it is, in a largely rural area, the siding here was once extremely active with cattle traffic and despite its tranquil location the railway station was busy with farm traffic; such was demand that it remained a staffed railway station until relatively late in the railway's history; the development of suitable road vehicles to transport livestock eventually saw to the demise of this. The cattle dock remains in situ today, used as a ballast storage area, the associated pen having been removed in poor condition in 1975. The area also served as a manure dump from outlying farms and deposits were moved island-wide by rail from here. Such was the unsavoury nature of this undertaking that a large advertisement hoarding was erected the length of the siding to shield passing passengers from the sight.

== Terminus ==
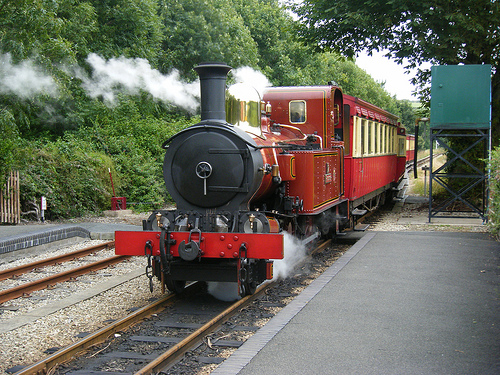
No.12 Hutchinson enters the station when it was the temporary terminus during all-island sewage works beneath the trackbed elsewhere.

The railway station had not been staffed regularly for a great many years (1958 being the last recorded regular staffing) and until a major relay of the entire railway in 2001 it had basically been untouched for well over a century. In connection with these major works, for the duration of the 2002 summer season the railway station acted as the railway's terminus while major tracklaying was in progress and at this time the railway station facilities were improved considerably, with each of the two rooms of the original building being renovated to provide accommodation for railway station staff to the left, and passengers to the right. A drinks vending machine was installed at this time, and it was said that it was the most activity that the sleepy railway station had even seen in its entire 130+ year existence. When the track renewal programme was completed it was revered to being a quiet rural halt, though the improved facilities were to remain beneficial for the annual Santa Trains which terminated here until 2009. The revised timings for the festive services saw the railway station once again used as the temporary terminus in December 2014 when the Santa Specials returned to use the railway station building as the grotto. In more recent times the railway station has also been used as the terminus for various photographic charter specials (the railway station is a popular backdrop for photographs) as well as extra non-passenger trains that operate during the annual Rush Hour event and the Manx Heritage Transport Festival which has taken place each July/August since introduction in 2009. The 2014 event marked 140 years of the Douglas-Port Erin line and saw a special service hauled by diesel electric locomotive No. 21 call at Santon railway station with a train carrying a selection of Peel P.50 motorcars.

== Environs ==
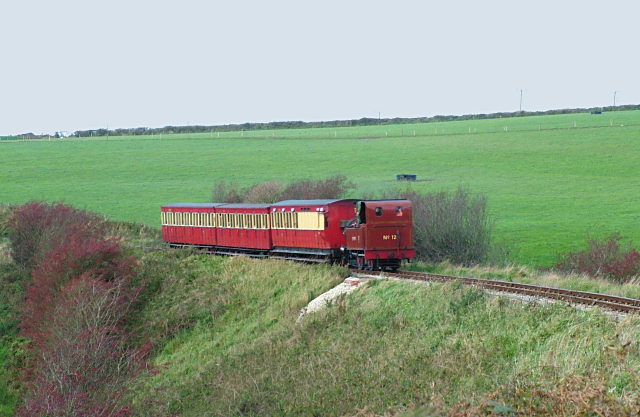
A northbound train crosses the Santon Burn to the immediate southwest of the railway station.

The railway station can be found by taking a left turn immediately after having passed over the bridge under which the railway travels. The turning is demarcated by a white wall with the railway station's name carved into a stone set into the wall. There is a further driveway entrance on the northern approach which is accessed via a small road to the railway station's northeasterly side. The station's sheltered location boasts some magnificent palm trees. What now forms a flower bed on the railway station platform was once the foundation for wooden store, constructed from the bodywork of an old brake van; it was common to find new uses for vehicles in this way. There was also a manure siding protected from the running line by a series of hoardings; the goods siding and its respective platform remain extant although relaid in recent years. The siding for many years was home to an array of expired stock such as the final surviving wagon M.70 and the railway's breakdown crane. In connection with the railway station's temporary role as the line's terminus in 2002 a water tank on metal legs was installed and this remains extant although largely unused. A park bench is located on the "up" platform with a brass plaque duly dedicated. Immediately to the south of the railway station the line passes underneath the main Douglas to Port Erin road by means of a bridge and after passing through a short cutting passes over the Santon Burn atop a man-made embankment. Entry to the railway station from the north side is over another high bridge. Within walking distance of the railway station is the Mann Cat Sanctuary and Murray's Motorcycle Museum both of which open at key dates in the summer months. The railway station is also a popular drop off for the walk to nearby Port Grenaugh and the famous Fairy Bridge.

== Friends Of... ==
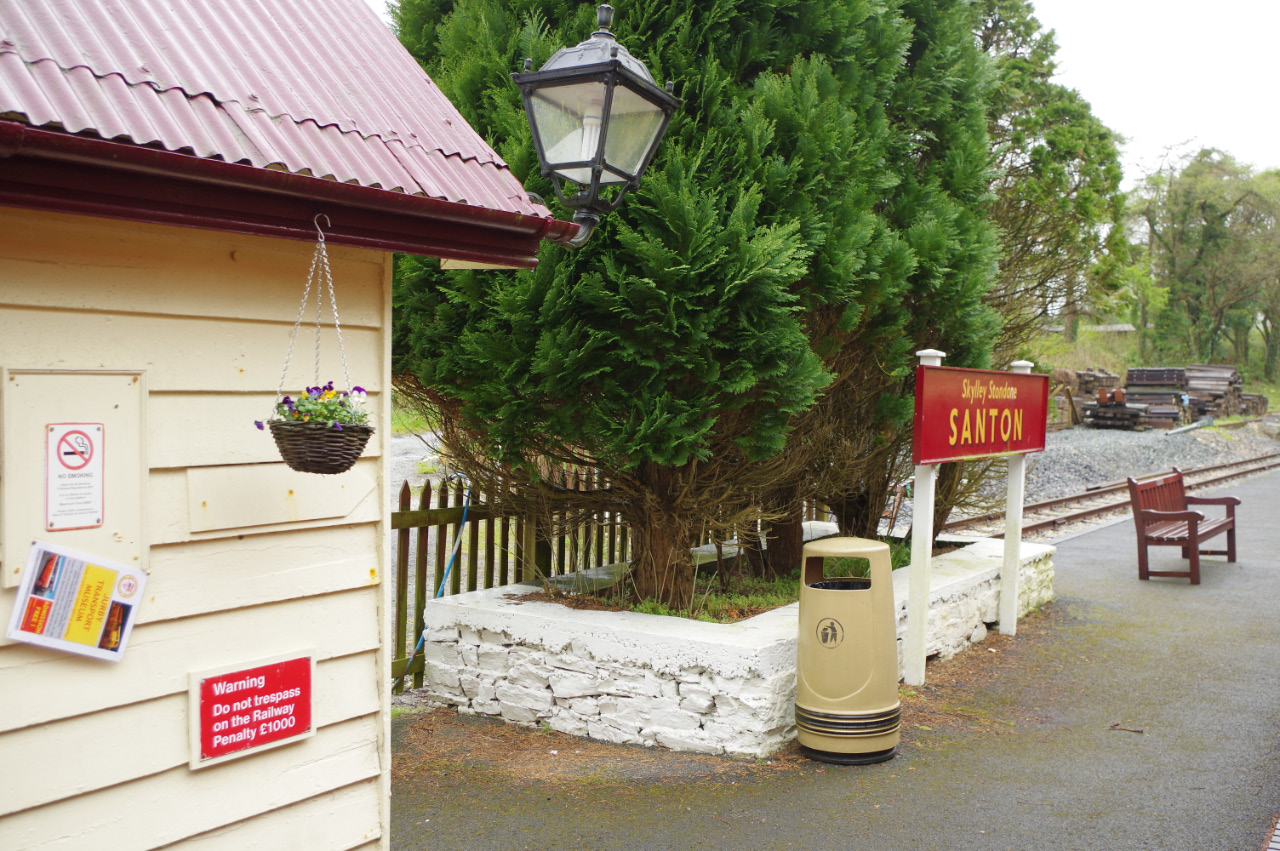
The original structure remains, the macadam platform was added in 1999

Since the summer of 2013 there has been a small community group tending for the railway station in the summer months; in addition to colourful floral displays on the site the group have also provided some period platform furniture and hope to expand their activities in the future with the addition of period signage and other historical enhancements. The group work in conjunction with similar Friends of... groups that exist elsewhere along the line, notably the Friends Of... Castletown Station and a group at Port Erin.

== Route ==
Preceding station	Isle of Man Railway	Following station
Ballasalla	Port Erin Line	Port Soderick

== See also ==
- Isle of Man Railway stations
- Mount Murray

== Sources ==
- Isle of Man Steam Railway Supporters' Association
