= Sarah's Cottage, Isle of Man =

Sarah’s Cottage

- Location within Isle of Man
- 54°13′40.7″N 4°37′12.4″W
- Location: Sarah's Cottage, Kirk German

History
- Built: c.1865, 1930-1932

Sarah's Cottage (Manx: Ballavaish [baləˈveːʃ], 'farm of the steep sided hill') is situated between the 11th milestone and 12th milestones on Creg Willey’s Hill on the primary A3 Castletown to Ramsey Road in the parish of Kirk German in the Isle of Man.

== Description ==
A small stone cottage on Creg Willey's Hill was occupied by Sarah Corlett of Cronk Dhoo in the 1890's. As part of 'The Long Round,' the journey from Castletown to Ramsey using the primary A3 road made by horse-drawn carriers and later by Charabanc many residents on the route provided food and by the roadside to travellers and the stop at Creg Willey's Hill by Sarah Corlett's cottage was a popular one for refreshments. The many hill-farms in the area also provided passing trade as school children attending the last school on the Isle of Man to still teach Manx Gaelic at the old Cronk-y-Voddy School and they referred to Sarah Corlett in Manx Gaelic as Sarah Vilyn ('Sarah of the Sweets').

== Motor-sport heritage ==
The Glen Helen section of the A3 Castletown to Ramsey road including Sarah’s Cottage was part of the St John's Short Course used for the Isle of Man TT races between 1907 and 1910.

The Glen Helen section of A3 Castletown to Ramsey including Sarah’s Cottage was part of the 37.50 Mile Four Inch Course for the RAC Tourist Trophy automobile races held in the Isle of Man between 1908 and 1922.

In 1911, the Four Inch Course for automobiles was first used by the Auto-Cycling Union for the Isle of Man TT motorcycle races. This included the Glen Helen section of Laurel Bank, Black Dub, Sarah’s Cottage and Creg Willeys Hill and the course later became known as the 37.73 mile Isle of Man TT Mountain Course which has been used since 1911 for the Isle of Man TT Races and from 1923 for the Manx Grand Prix races.

=== 1965 Senior TT ===
During the 1965 Isle of Man TT, heavy rain and strong cross-winds on the A18 Mountain Road section of the course dominated the Senior TT races. The notoriously difficult uphill section of the Mountain Course at Sarah's Cottage and the heavy rain and slippery conditions caused Giacomo Agostini to slide-off on lap two. This was followed on lap three when his MV Agusta teammate, Mike Hailwood, crashed at the same spot at Sarah's Cottage. Hailwood bump started his damaged machine, pointing in the wrong direction along the course downhill, turned around and went on to win the race.

== Gallery ==
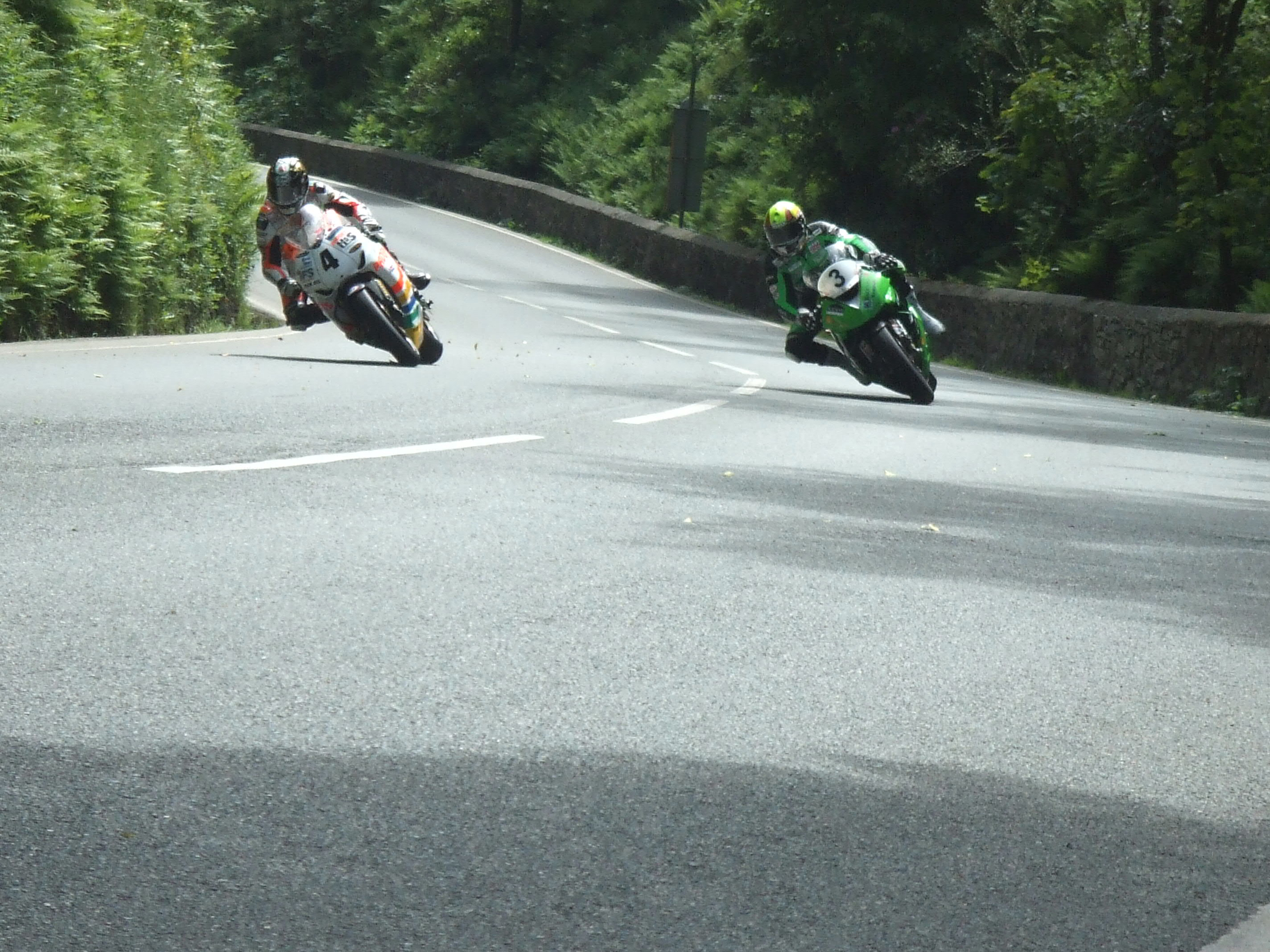
View from Sarah's Cottage towards the Glen Helen area, with Ian Hutchinson cornering inside Ian Lougher in Senior TT during 2010, demonstrating that some places on the course have more variation in racing lines than others

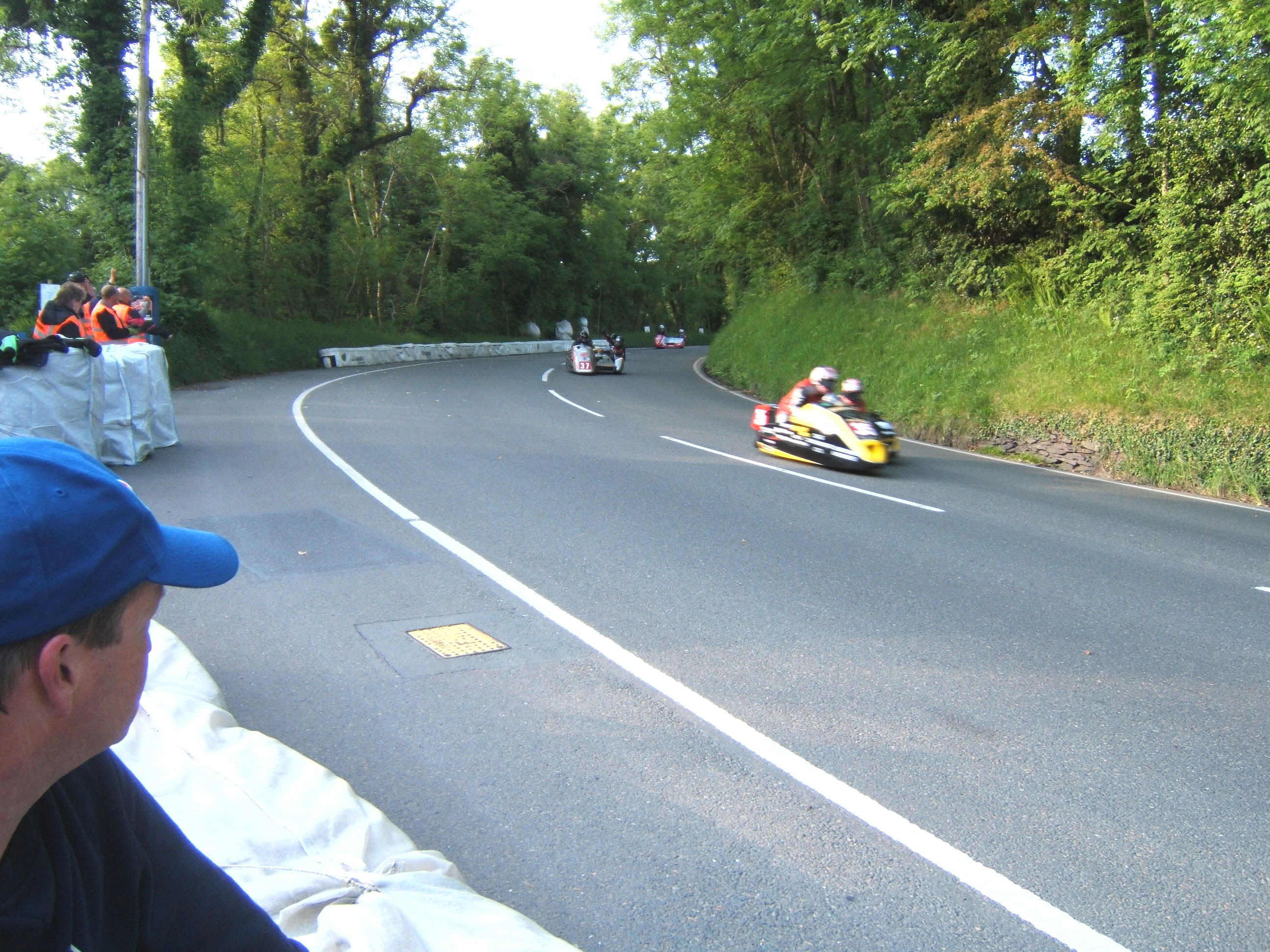
View from Sarah's Cottage uphill towards the Creg Willey's area, with sidecars returning to Paddock in wrong direction after a Red Flag race stoppage caused by a competitor crash during 2009
