= Ballagarey Corner, Isle of Man =

Residential village and point on road-race course

Ballagarey
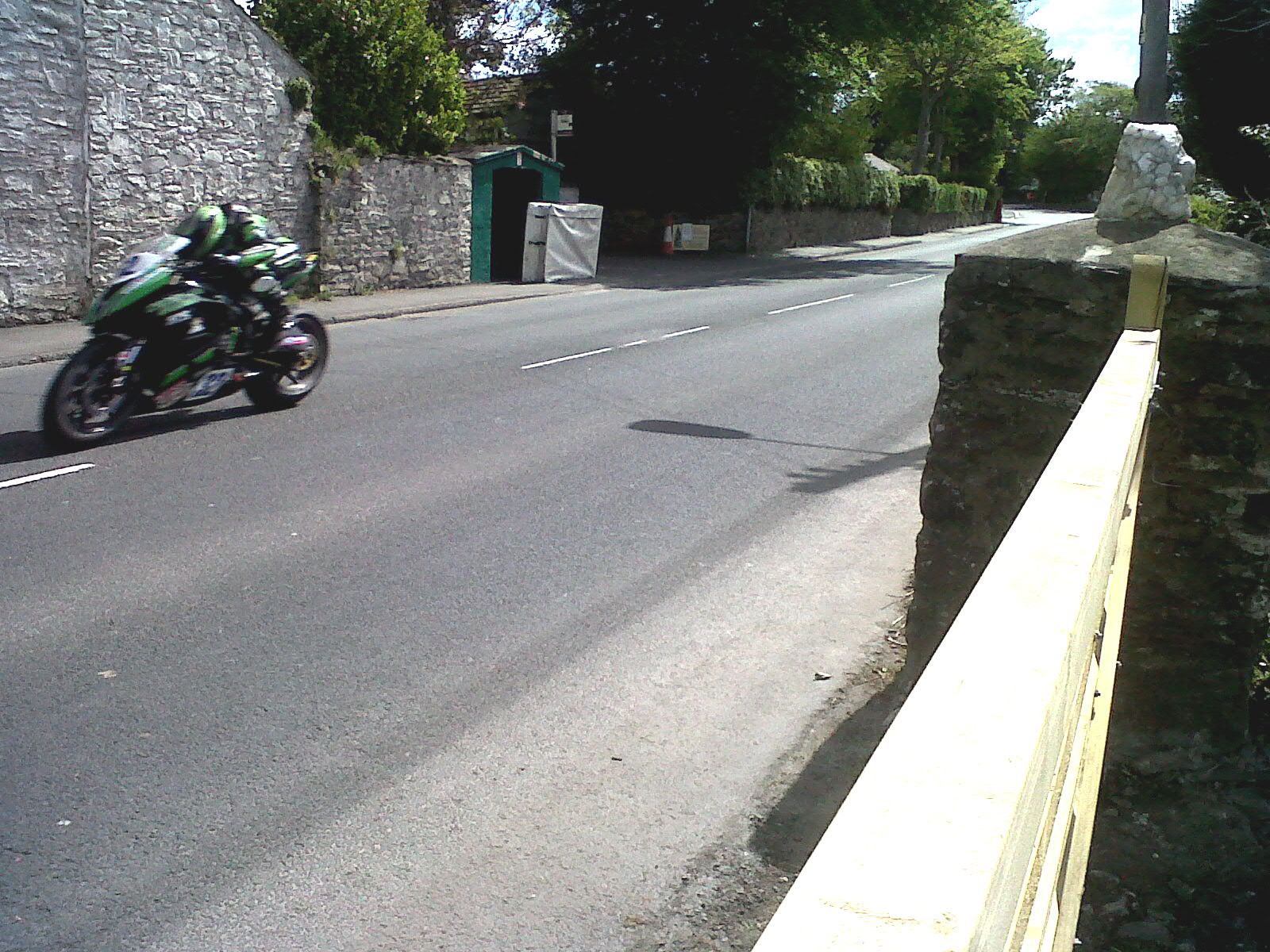
- TT Rider at speed passing Ballagarey House in 2013 with the actual Ballagarey Corner, a right-kink in the direction taken by competitors, in the background

- Location within Isle of Man
- 54°10′26.5″N 4°32′58.2″W

Ballagarey (Manx: balley-y-gharee [baləˈɡɛːɾi] – 'sourland, wet area farm') is located between the third and fourth milemarkers used for recognition of the Snaefell Mountain Course road-racing circuit on the primary A1 Douglas to Peel road, in the parish of Marown in the Isle of Man.

== Description ==
As part of a wayside residential ribbon development, Ballagarey is situated on the eastern edge of Glen Vine and Crosby villages on the primary A1 road in the Douglas-to-Peel central valley.

The nearby area is mainly farmland of Elm Bank and Ballagarey farm estates including the Baldwin Valley and with nearby summits of Greeba Mountain 1,385 feet (422 m), Slieau Ruy 1,572 feet (479 m), Colden 1,598 feet (487 m) and Slieau Ree (near to Keppel Gate) at 1,037 feet (316 m).

== Motor-Sport heritage ==
The Ballagarey Corner (or Elm Bank) section of the A1 Douglas to Peel road was part of the short Highland Course (40.38 miles) from 1906 and the also the 37.50 Mile Four Inch Course used for car racing including the RAC Tourist Trophy car races held between 1905 and 1922.

In 1911, the Four Inch Course was first used by the Auto-Cycling Union for the Isle of Man TT motorcycle races. This included the Ballagarey Corner and Crosby village sections and the course later became known as the 37.73 mile Isle of Man TT Mountain Course which has been used since 1911 for the Isle of Man TT Races and from 1923 for the Manx Grand Prix races.

It was the setting for a spectacular crash in 2010 when Guy Martin's race bike crashed at high speed, with a full tank of fuel after a pit stop just minutes earlier, exploding into a fireball a day after a fatal racing accident involving New Zealand rider Paul Dobbs at the same location. Keith Amor, closely following Martin, had to ride through the immediate aftermath, having been alerted by seeing smoke and trackside marshals running. Martin escaped serious injury, and after being helicopter-airlifted, recovered in hospital from bruising to both lungs and minor fractures to his upper spine.

Due to the high-speeds attained through Ballagarey during motorcycle competition, it has become known as Ballascarey. Eight riders died at the Ballagarey Corner, most recently Mark Purslow in 2022 and Gary Vines in 2023.

== Media ==
Ballagarey Corner featured in the Isle of Man Film CinemaNX production TT3D: Closer to the Edge after an accident to road racer Guy Martin during lap 3 of the 2010 Senior TT races caused a number of protective hay bales to be set alight by a petrol fireball.
