= 2010 Isle of Man TT =

Annual motorcycle racing event

2010 Isle of Man TT Races
- Isle of Man TT Mountain Course layout

Race details
- Date: 29 May – 11 June 2010
- Location: Douglas, Isle of Man
- Course: Isle of Man TT Mountain Course; 37.73 mi (60.72 km)

Superbike TT
Pole Position	Fastest Lap
(England) Ian Hutchinson	(Isle of Man) Conor Cummins
130.614 mph	131.511 mph
Podium
1. (England) Ian Hutchinson
2. (Northern Ireland) Michael Dunlop	3. (Australia) Cameron Donald

Sidecar TT Race 1
Pole Position	Fastest Lap
(Isle of Man) Dave Molyneux/ (England) Patrick Farrance	(Isle of Man) Dave Molyneux/ (England) Patrick Farrance
115.464 mph	115.284 mph
Podium
1. (Austria) Klaus Klaffenböck / (Isle of Man) Dan Sayle
2. (Isle of Man) Dave Molyneux/ (England) Patrick Farrance	3. (England) Tim Reeves/ (England) Dipash Chauhan

Supersport TT Race 1
Pole Position	Fastest Lap
(Northern Ireland) Michael Dunlop	(Scotland) Keith Amor
126.395 mph	126.909 mph
Podium
1. (England) Ian Hutchinson
2. (England) Guy Martin	3. (Northern Ireland) Michael Dunlop

Superstock TT
Pole Position	Fastest Lap
(Northern Ireland) Michael Dunlop	(England) Ian Hutchinson
128.324 mph	130.741 mph
Podium
1. (England) Ian Hutchinson
2. (Northern Ireland) Ryan Farquhar	3. (Isle of Man) Conor Cummins

Sidecar TT Race 2
Pole Position	Fastest Lap
(Isle of Man) Dave Molyneux/ (England) Patrick Farrance	(Austria) Klaus Klaffenböck / (Isle of Man) Dan Sayle
115.464 mph	114.157 mph
Podium
1. (Austria) Klaus Klaffenböck / (Isle of Man) Dan Sayle
2. (England) John Holden/ (England) Andrew Winkle	3. (England) Conrad Harrison/ (England) Kerry Williams

Supersport TT Race 2
Pole Position	Fastest Lap
(Northern Ireland) Michael Dunlop	(Northern Ireland) Michael Dunlop
126.395 mph	127.836 mph
Podium
1. (England) Ian Hutchinson
2. (Northern Ireland) Michael Dunlop	3. (Scotland) Keith Amor

TT Zero
Pole Position	Fastest Lap
(United States) Mark Miller	(United States) Mark Miller
94.664 mph	96.820 mph
Podium
1. (United States) Mark Miller
2. (England) Robert Barber	3. (England) James McBride

Senior TT
Pole Position	Fastest Lap
(England) Ian Hutchinson	(England) Ian Hutchinson
130.614 mph	131.487 mph
Podium
1. (England) Ian Hutchinson
2. (Northern Ireland) Ryan Farquhar	3. (New Zealand) Bruce Anstey

The 2010 Isle of Man TT was held between Saturday 29 May and Friday 11 June on the 37.73-mile Isle of Man TT Mountain Course. The 2010 races again included a second 600 cc Supersport Junior TT race. The Lightweight TT and Ultra-Lightweight TT race class previously held on the 4.25-mile (6.84 km) Billown Circuit in the Isle of Man for the 2008 Isle of Man TT and 2009 Isle of Man TT were dropped from the 2010 race schedule. The 2010 Isle of Man TT Races included the one-lap TT Zero for racing motorcycles "to be powered without the use of carbon based fuels and have zero toxic/noxious emissions." which replaced the TTXGP and also a Suzuki 50th Anniversary Lap of Honour and the TT Classic Parade which were held before the main Senior TT race.

The Blue Riband event of the 2010 TT Race week the Senior TT run over a reduced race distance after the race was red-flagged on lap 3 after an incident at Ballagarey on the TT Course involving Guy Martin and caused a number of protective hay-bails to be set alight. The 2010 Isle of Man TT Races provided a clean-sweep of the solo motorcycle classes for Ian Hutchinson winning five Isle of Man TT races in a week, including the Senior TT race, the Superport and Superstock TT races, the six lap Superbike TT race and also winning the prestigious Joey Dunlop 2010 Isle of Man TT Championship. The previous record for four race wins in a week completed during the 1996 Isle of Man TT was held by Phillip McCallen. During the 2010 Isle of Man TT Races, Ian Hutchinson also completed a Junior/Senior double win and completed two Isle of Man TT race wins in one day, winning the Supersport TT Race 1 and the Superstock TT races for the second consecutive year.

The 2010 Sidecar TT Race 1 proved to be a first-time win for the former World Sidecar champion Klaus Klaffenböck and the first Austrian winner of an Isle of Man TT race since Rupert Hollaus won the 1954 Ultra-Lightweight TT held on the Clypse Course. The sidecar crew of Klaus Klaffenböck/Dan Sayle also won the 2010 Sidecar TT Race 1 and the 2010 Sidecar TT Championship. The closely contested 2010 TT Privateers Championship was won by James McBride.

Another first-time winner during the 2010 Isle of Man TT races was Mark Miller from the United States after winning the inaugural TT Zero race with a battery-powered, electric motor-driven MotoCzysz E1pc motorcycle and the first United States winner since Dave Roper won the 1984 Historic TT riding a 500 cc Matchless. The MotoCzysz E1pc was also the first American-manufactured motorcycle to win an Isle of Man TT Race since Oliver Godfrey won the 1911 Senior TT with an Indian V-Twin motorcycle.

During the 2010 Supersport TT Race 2, the New Zealand competitor Paul Dobbs crashed fatally at Ballagarey and the Austrian Martin Loicht died in an accident at Quarry Bends during the same race. The 2010 Post-TT Races held on the Billown Circuit, the solo motorcycle races were won by William Dunlop with a Hat-trick of wins in the 125 cc, 250 cc and 600 cc classes. The 400 cc and 650 cc Twins class were run concurrently with other races; both classes were won by Roy Richardson to give a double win at the 2010 Post-TT Races.

The 2010 Isle of Man TT formed the subject of the 2011 documentary TT3D: Closer to the Edge.

== Pre-TT Classic 2010 ==
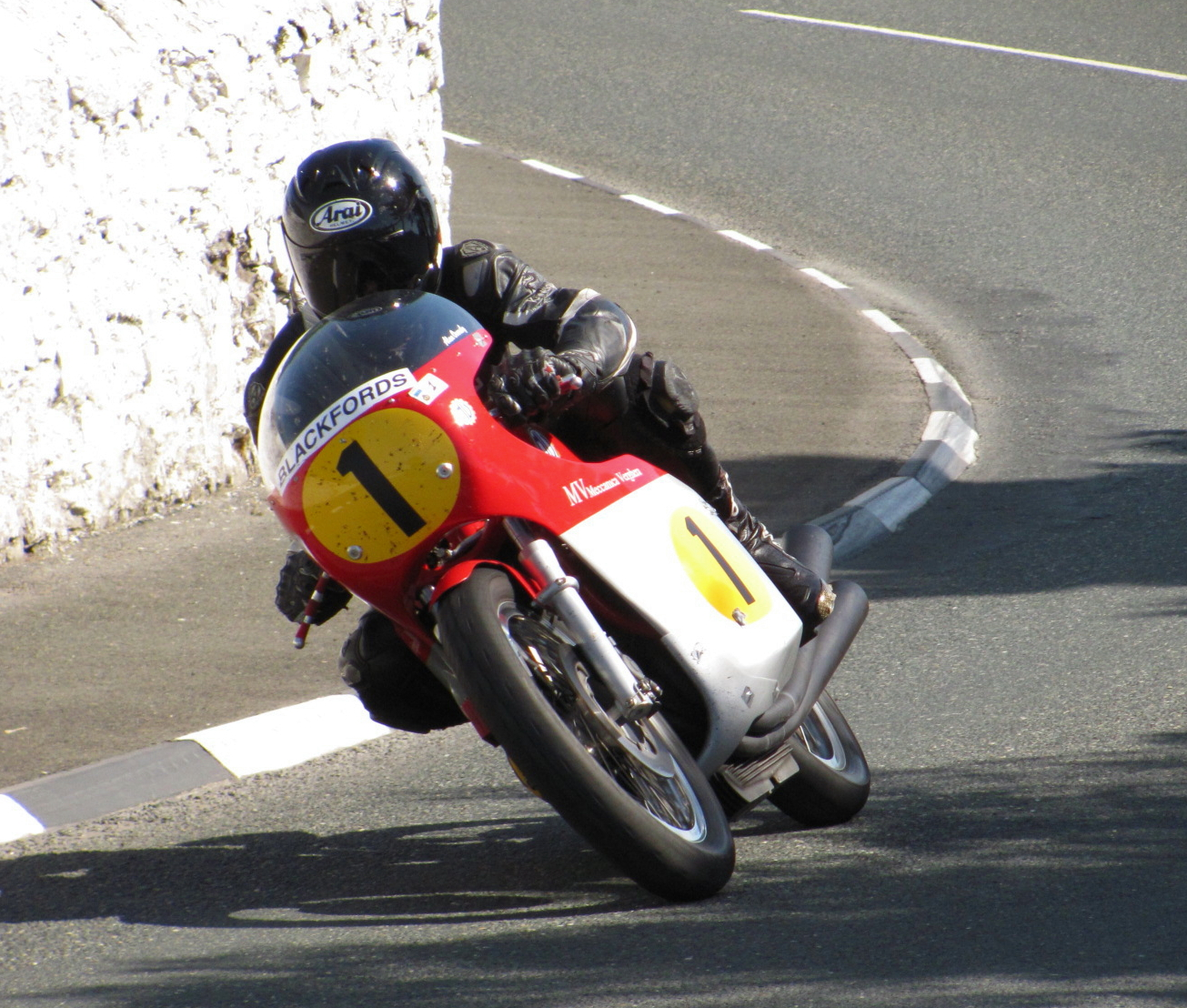
Senior Classic Race;- Alan Oversby 500 cc MV Agusta at Church Bends.

The traditional curtain-raiser since 1988 to the Isle of Man TT Festival has been the Pre-TT Classic Races held on the 4.25-mile (6.84 km) Billown Circuit in Castletown. The first evening practice session for the 2010 Pre-TT Classic Races were held on Friday 28 May 2010 in cold and blustery conditions. The fastest time in the first Friday practice session was set by the Isle of Man TT competitor Guy Martin in the Post Classic class in 2 minutes and 37.890 seconds at an average speed of 96.903 mph. The Senior class was dominated by Alan Oversby debuting a 500 cc MV Agusta on the Billown Circuit at an average speed of 91.656 mph. With the highly competitive Junior class, it was Roy Richardson who was fastest in the Friday evening practice riding a 350 cc Aermacchi at an average speed of 84.551 mph and Chris Palmer in second place with a speed of 83.181 mph riding a 350 cc AJS. Fastest time in the Lightweight class was an average speed of 83.603 mph set by Mike Hose riding a 250 cc Ariel Arrow and Vince Biggs/Phil Biggs with a 1000 cc BMW outfit led the practice for the sidecar class at an average speed of 79.287 mph.

The first race of the 2010 Pre-TT Classic Races was the 350 cc Singles event held on Saturday 30 May 2010 and run in light rain and drizzle. Despite setting fast-time in practice and storming into the lead on lap 1, Roy Richardson slipped-off at Church Bends on lap 2 in the difficult conditions. This allowed local competitor and TT winner Chris Palmer to win in 19 minutes and 41.282 seconds at an average race speed of 77.712 mph riding a 350 cc AJS motorcycle. The 250 cc class was won by Ted Fenwick riding a Ducati at an average race speed of 69.279 mph.

Racing for the 2010 Pre-TT Classic recommenced on Monday 31 May 2010 with the 9 lap (38.25 miles) Lightweight Classic race in almost perfect conditions held in bright sunshine and light winds. The leader from the massed-start for the Lightweight race was Ewan Hamilton riding a 242 cc Suzuki leading all 9 laps to win in 27 minutes and 26.926 seconds an average race speed of 83.610 mph. The Senior Classic Race was also a start to finish race for the winner Mike Oversby riding a 500 cc MV Agusta at an average race speed of 90.659 mph. The 6 lap (25.5 miles) Sidecar Classic Race was won by Vince Biggs/Phil Biggs with a 1000 cc BMW outfit at an average race speed of 80.509 mph with only two competitors running at the finish.

Recommencing after the lunch break was the Junior Classic race and the winner was Mike Hose riding a 350 cc Honda at average race speed of 85.796 mph. The penultimate race was the Post-Classic Superbike Race and the early leader was the Isle of Man TT race competitor Guy Martin retiring from a comfortable leader on lap 5 and the overall winner and class winner of the Post Classic class was Roy Richardson riding a 247 cc Yamaha TZ at an average race speed of 93.397 mph. The winner of the 850 cc Classic class was Alan Oversby riding a 500 cc Norton at an average race speed of 93.244 mph. The final race of the 2010 Pre-TT Classic was the Support Race and the winner was Bernie Wright riding a 347 cc Yamsel at an average race speed of 82.943 mph.

== TT Practice Week 2010 ==
=== Saturday evening practice ===
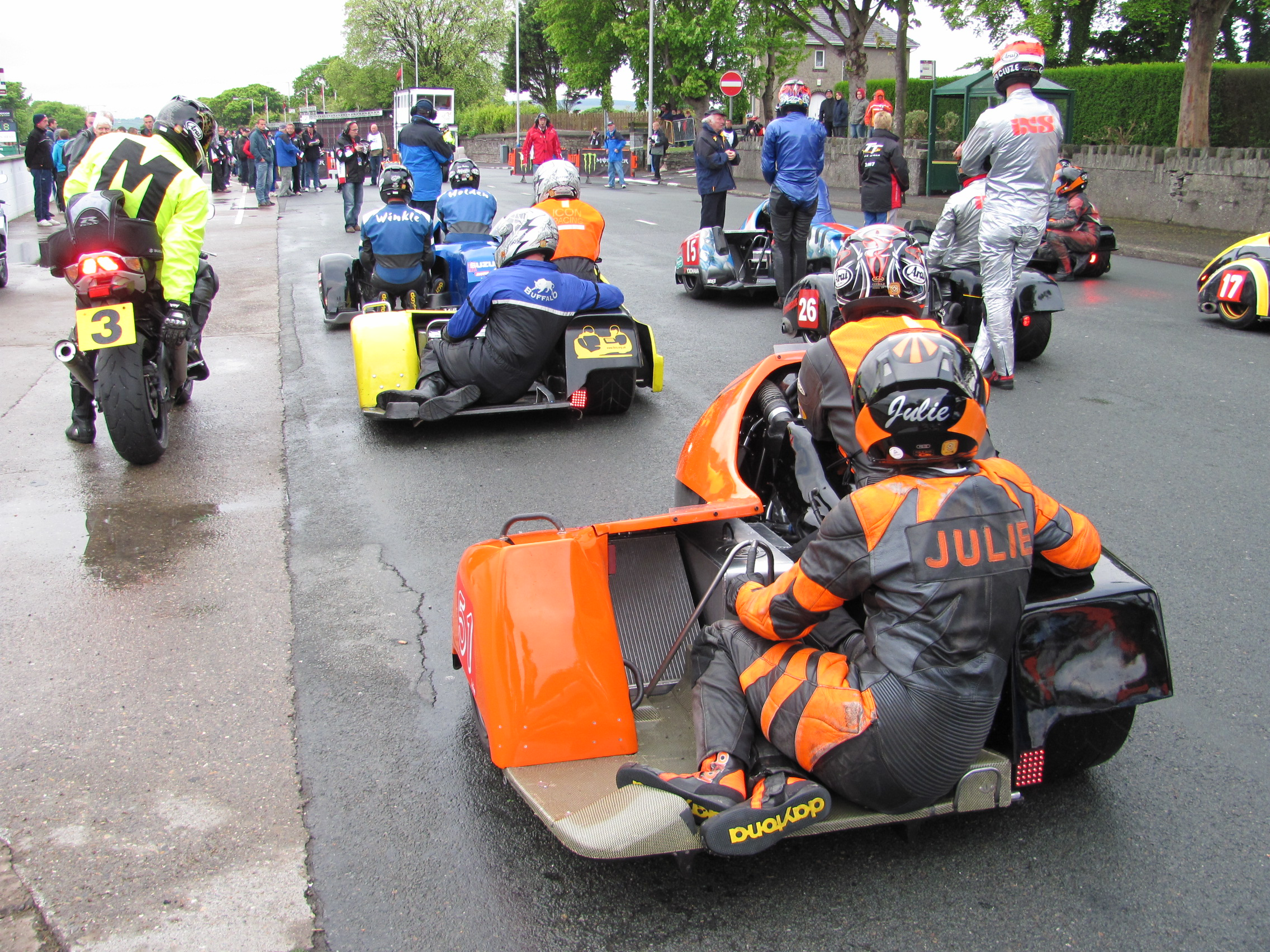
The Sidecar Newcomers in the rain delayed first TT Practice Session 2010.

The first practice session for 2010 Isle of Man TT races was due to feature an evening untimed practice session and a Newcomers control lap on Saturday 29 May 2010. Due to inclement weather conditions including light rain and low cloud on the Mountain Section of the course, the untimed session was cancelled by the Race organisers and only the TT Newcomers completed their speed control lap. There was a long delay to the start of the first practice session caused by vehicles on the course, the removal of signage from the Mountain Section and a wait for an improvement in the weather conditions and for better visibility on the Mountain Section. The competitors were a little disappointed about losing the first practice session to the weather and John McGuinness said;- "It would have been good to go out but I don't think we'd have learned a lot in the damp conditions." As with previous years the Newcomers Control Lap was led away from the TT Grandstand by the TT Travelling Marshals and a steady pace set by the accompanying experienced Isle of Man TT and Manx Grand Prix competitors. The first group of Newcomers to leave the TT Grandstand at 8 pm was the former TT winner and Rider's Liaison Officer Richard Quayle with the South African competitor Hudson Kennaugh from Durban, Brandon Cretu from Felton, Pennsylvania, David Johnson from Adelaide and the Swiss competitor Herve Ganther.

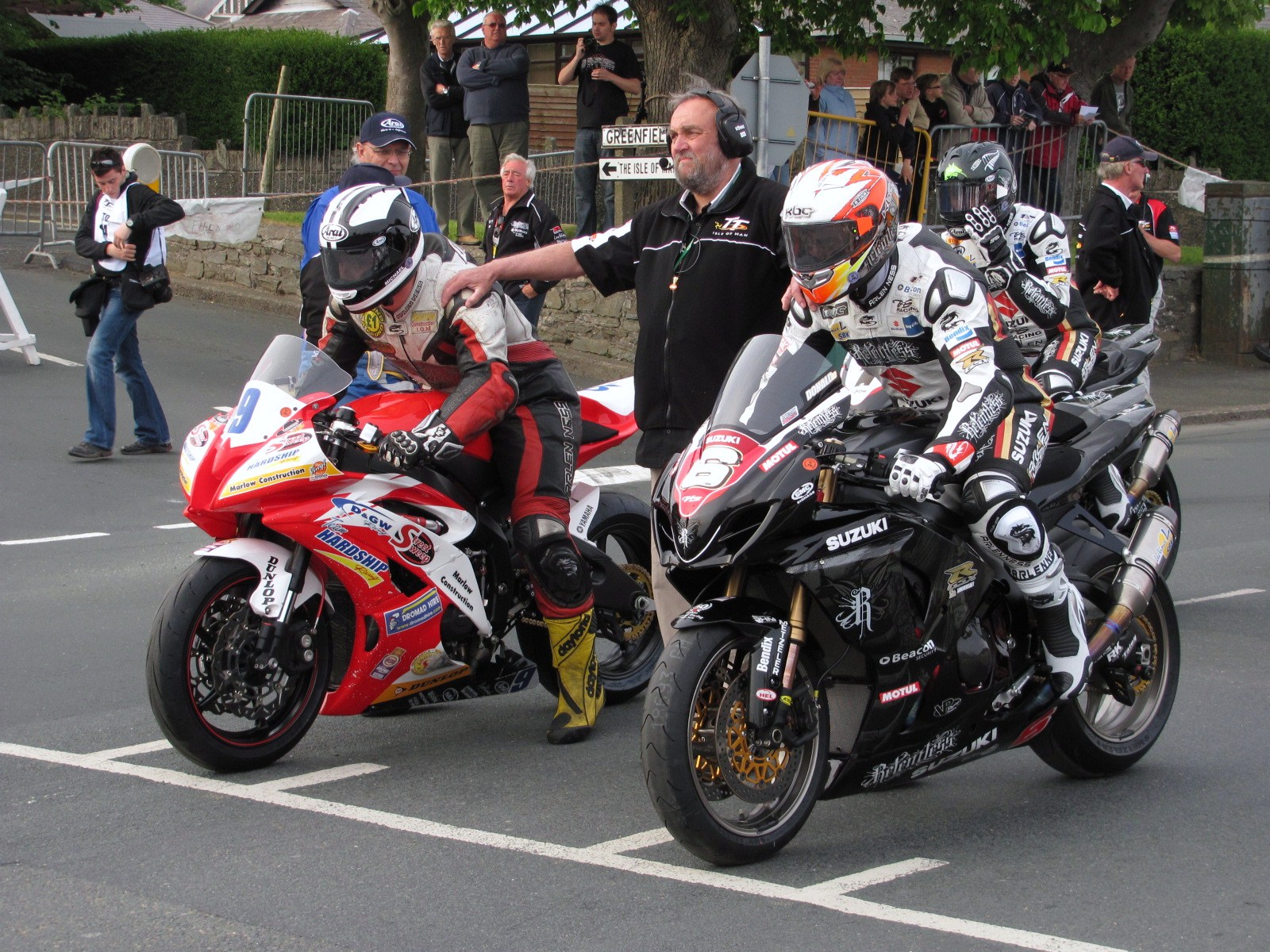
Michael Dunlop & Cameron Donald line-up for the start of the Monday evening first timed practice session on 31 May 2010.

Fellow TT Rider's Liaison Officer John Barton accompanied Brian McCormack, the Japanese rider Takahiro Itami and Gary May. The former 2003 Senior Manx Grand Prix winner Paul Duckett led a group of newcomers including Tony Czyzewski, Dan Cooper, the Austrian rider Martin Loicht and Stephen Thompson. The final group of Newcomer solo competitors on their speed control lap were escorted by the 2002 Lightweight Manx Grand Prix winner Nigel Beattie with James Hurrell, David Jones and Clinton Pienaar from Johannesburg. The newcomers control lap a number of outfits for the Sidecar TT were accompanied by experienced TT sidecar competitors Roy Hanks/Dave Wells and John Holden/Andrew Winkle and included TT sidecar newcomers Michael Grambuller/Stefan Trautner from Vienna, the German crew Mike Roscher/Gregory Cluze from Kassel and Roger Stockton/Annette Daykin. The South African competitor Hudson Kennaugh stopped at Douglas Road Corner on the Newcomers Control Lap with technical problems and Clinton Pienaar at the Quarterbridge.

=== Monday evening practice ===
The first timed session of the 2010 Isle of Man TT commenced on Monday 31 May 2010 after the Saturday practice session was cancelled by race organisers due to inclement weather. Held in warm overcast conditions, the Monday evening practice session for solo motorcycles commenced promptly at 6:35 pm with Michael Dunlop and Cameron Donald the first competitors away from the TT Grandstand. The fastest time on Monday evening practice was set by Ian Hutchinson on a 1000 cc Honda in the Superbike class in 17 minutes and 38.66 seconds at an average speed of 128.302 mph. The Supersport TT class was dominated by Michael Dunlop and the winner of the 2009 Supersport Race 2 with a lap at an average speed of 123.960 mph riding a 600 cc Yamaha motorcycle. The Superstock TT class was led by Ryan Farquhar riding a 1000 cc Kawasaki at an average speed of 126.799 mph. The Sidecar TT class on Monday evening, the fastest time was set by Klaus Klaffenböck/Dan Sayle with a 600 cc LCR Honda outfit in 20 minutes and 15.35 seconds at an average speed of 111.761 mph.

=== Tuesday evening practice ===
After overnight rain the Tuesday practice session was held in ideal conditions and warm evening sunshine with damp patches reported on the many tree lined sections of the course including Glen Helen and the Ramsey Hairpin. The practice session was again dominated by Ian Hutchinson in the Superbike class setting at an average speed of 128.017 mph and 2.36 seconds slower than the mark set on Monday evening. It was Michael Dunlop that was again set the fastest time in the Supersport class at an average speed of 122.278 mph. The Superstock class the fastest time was again by Ian Hutchinson riding a 1000 cc Honda at 126.339 mph and just 3.9 seconds slower than the time set by Ryan Farquhar on the previous night. In the Sidecar class the first lap under 20 minutes was recorded by Dave Molyneux/Patrick Farrance with a 600 cc DMR Kawasaki outfit in 19 minutes and 47.77 seconds an average speed of 114.355 mph to lead the Sidecar TT practice times. At Keppel Gate during Tuesday evening practice, Chris Bradshaw suffered a shoulder injury and the American competitor James Vanderhaar walked into the TT Grandstand after an incident at Governor's Bridge. The local Isle of Man side crew of Glyn Jones/Jason O'Connor following an accident at Lambfell Mooar on Creg Willey's Hill sustained ankle and hand friction burns.

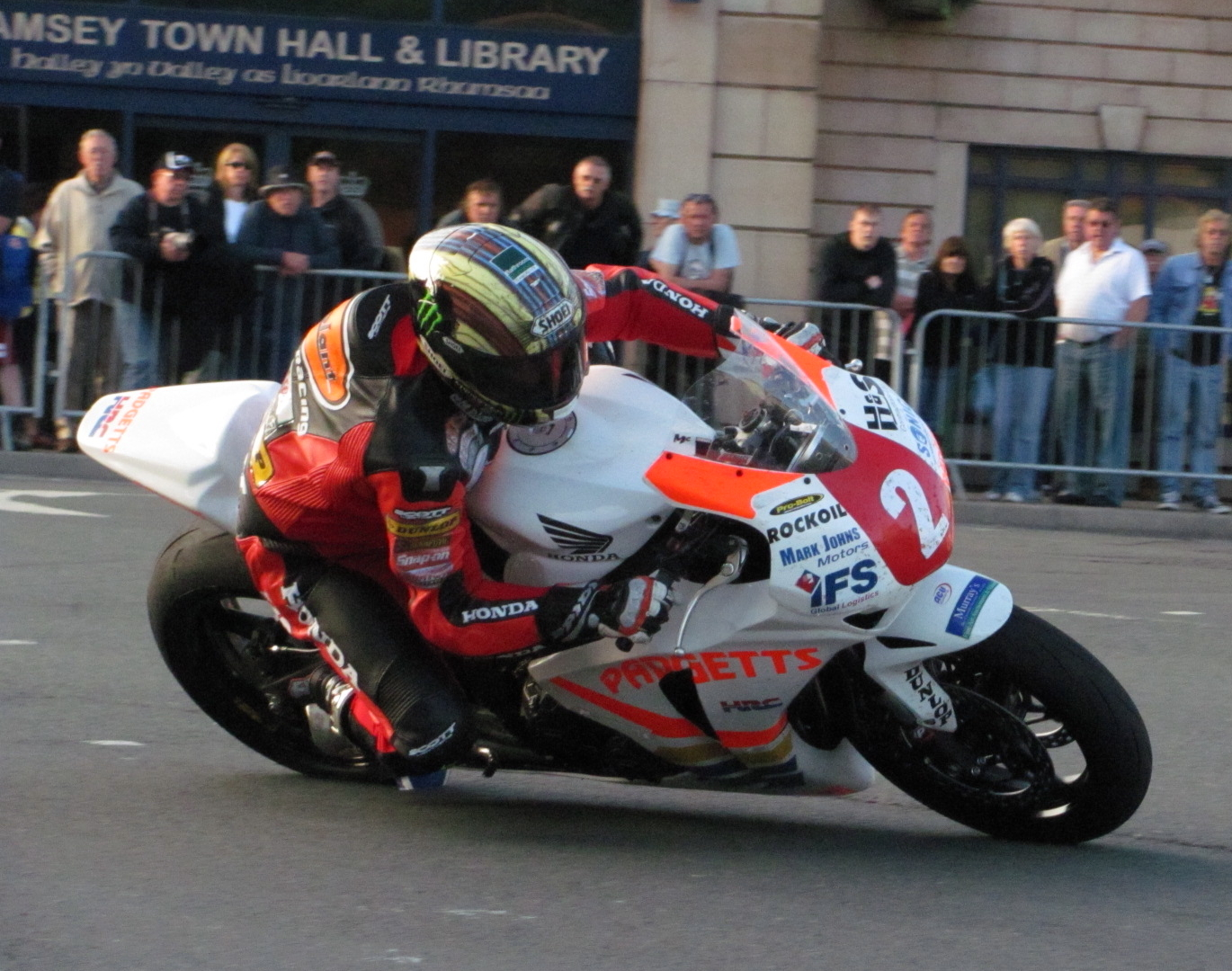
John McGuinness – 1000 cc Honda at Parliament Square, Ramsey during Wednesday evening Practice on 2 June 2010.

=== Wednesday evening practice ===
The Wednesday evening practice session held on 2 June 2010 was run in almost perfect conditions and without most of the damp road patches which had caused problems to competitors the previous evening. In the Superbike class, the first 130 mph lap was recorded in practice for the 2010 Isle of Man TT races by John McGuinness riding a 1000 cc Honda in 17 minutes and 22.89 seconds an average race speed of 130.242 mph to move to the top of the practice Superbike/Senior TT leaderboard. The 600 cc Supersport class continued to be dominated by Michael Dunlop lapping the Mountain Course in 18 minutes and 5.87 seconds an average speed of 125.087 mph and 9.87 seconds faster than his time recorded on Monday practice. For the Superstock class there was further improvements in practice times with Ryan Farquhar also 10.69 seconds faster than his time on the Monday evening practice, recording an average speed of 128.076 mph. After winning the Superstock class at the 2010 North West 200 Races, the 1000 cc BMW ridden by Keith Amor moved into second place on the Superstock TT leaderboard, with a lap at an average speed of 127.525 mph during Wednesday evening practice. For the Sidecar TT, the 600 cc DMR Kawasaki of Dave Molyneux/Patrick Farrance continued to lap under 20 minutes pushing the practice pace to an average speed of 114.748 mph. The TT newcomer Brian McCormack, Scott Wilson and Paul Shoesmith were involved in an accident at the Water Works Corner. Other incidents included TT newcomers, the Japanese competitor Takahiro Itami at the Jubilee Oak on Braddan Bridge and Brendan Cretu at the Nook. The 2009 Junior Manx Grand Prix winner Steven McIlvenna slipped-off at the nearby Governor's Bridge and Jenny Tinmouth at Sulby Bridge all without serious injury. Approaching Cruickshanks Corner, the passenger Keir Pedley fell from a sidecar outfit driven by Carl Fenwick sustaining leg injuries and was taken to Ramsey Cottage Hospital by Ambulance.

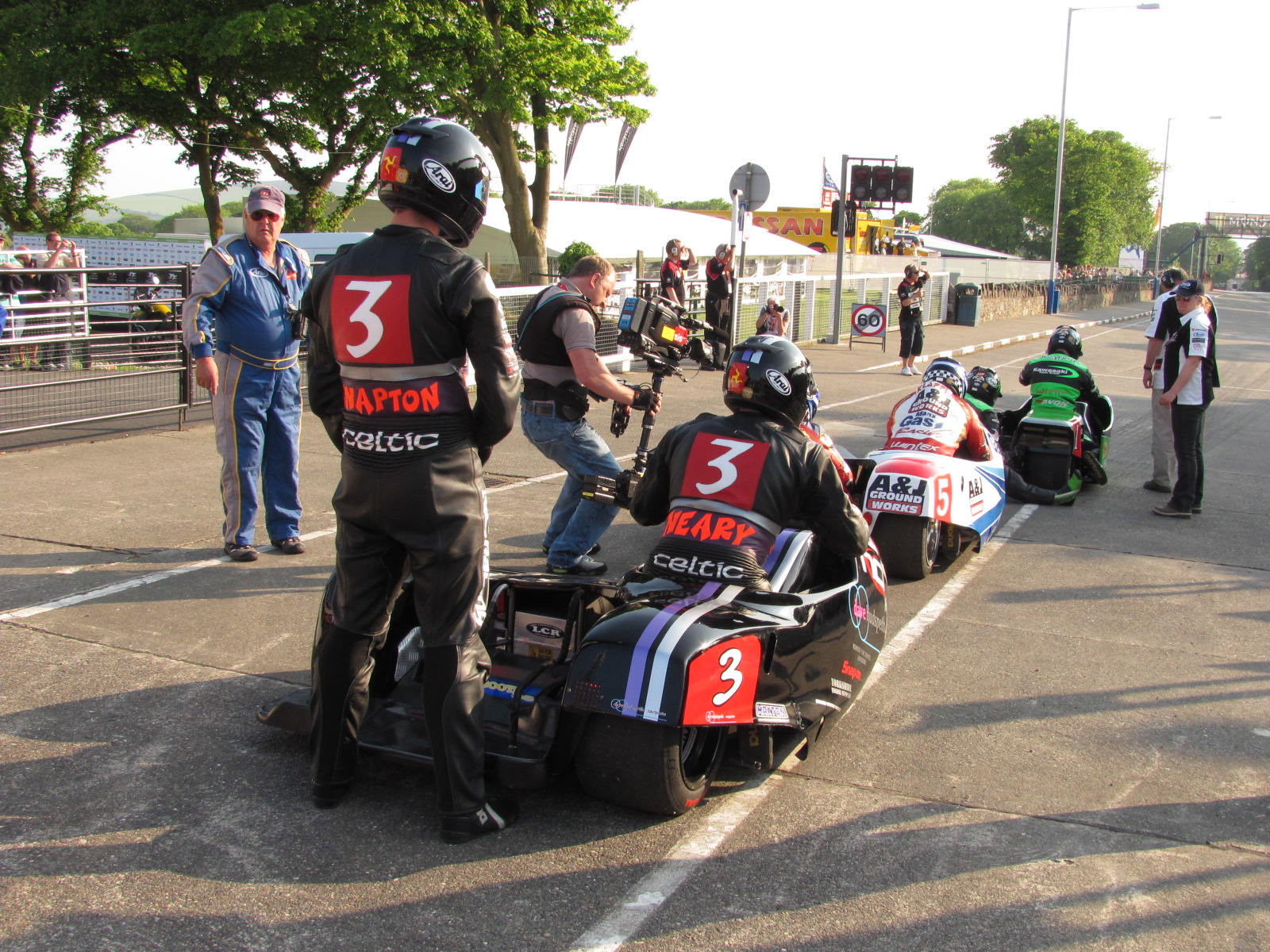
Sidecar competitors wait in the pit-lane to start practice on Thursday evening – 3 June 2010.

=== Thursday evening practice ===
The Thursday evening practice session was delayed until 6:45 pm due to a series of road traffic accidents on the A18 Mountain Road. The first scheduled session was the sidecars to allow an extended track-time for the class and also to permit the solo competitors to test the new pit-lane speed limit first used for the 2009 Manx Grand Prix. The 600 cc DMR Kawasaki of Dave Molyneux/Patrick Farrance was first away from the end of the TT Grandstand pit-lane and recorded another lap under 20 minutes to continue to dominate the class with a time of 19 minutes and 36.36 seconds and average speed of 115.464 mph. The Monday evening practice leader for sidecar class, Klaus Klaffenböck/Dan Sayle with a 600 cc LCR Honda outfit also recorded a sub-20-minute lap at an average speed of 114.096 mph in the Thursday evening practice session. In the Superbike class, Ian Hutchinson was fastest during practice and recorded his first 130 mph lap with a time of 17 minutes and 23.51 seconds at an average speed of 130.165 mph. The fastest time in the Supersport class was set by Keith Amor riding a 600 cc Honda motorcycle at an average speed of 124.797 mph to move into third place on the Supersport practice leaderboard. With the 1000 cc Superstock class, the fastest time of the evening was recorded by Michael Rutter at an average speed of 127.564 mph. The TT newcomer sidecar outfit of Nigel Mayers/Joseph Shardlow crashed at Kate's Cottage during Thursday evening practice with the passenger taken to Noble’s Hospital by Medical Helicopter.

=== Friday evening practice ===
The Friday evening practice session on 4 June 2010 was delayed until 6:30 pm and the first competitor away from the TT Grandstand in the sidecar class was the 600 cc LCR Suzuki of John Holden/Andrew Winkle following the Thursday practice format to allow the solo competitors a further test of the new 60 km/h pit-lane speed limit. The fastest time of the evening in the Sidecar TT class was recorded by Klaus Klaffenböck/Dan Sayle with a time of 19 minutes and 56.64 seconds at an average speed of 113.508 mph. The sidecar crew of John Holden/Andrew Winkle recorded their first lap in practice under 20 minutes at an average speed of 113.224 mph to move into third place in the Sidecar TT practice leaderboard. The Superbike class continued to be denominated by Ian Hutchinson with the only 130 mph lap during Friday evening practice in a time of 17 minutes and 19.92 seconds at an average speed of 130.614 mph to claim pole position for the Superbike TT Race. The fastest time for the 600 cc Supersport TT was Michael Dunlop recording the first lap in practice under 18 minutes for the class in a time of 17 minutes and 54.63 seconds an average speed of 126.395 mph. The fastest time for the 1000 cc Superstock TT was also set by Michael Dunlop at an average speed of 128.324 mph to displace Ryan Farquhar from pole position for the class. The New Zealander Bruce Anstey stopped at Sulby Bridge during Friday evening practice and Guy Martin was delayed with mechanical problems at Ballacraine. A further practice session occurred after racing on Saturday 5 June 2010 for the Supersport and Superstock classes with the TT Zero motorcycles also completing their first practice lap. The fastest time was recorded by Rob Barber the winner of the 2009 TTXGP class at an average speed of 84.875 mph riding the Team AGNI Motors entry.

== Results ==
=== Practice Times ===
==== Practice Times & Leaderboard Superbike/Senior TT ====
Plates; Black on White/Black on Yellow.

Rank	Rider	Sat 29 May	Mon 31 May	Tues 1 June	Wed 2 June	Thurs 3 June	Fri 4 June
1	(England) Ian Hutchinson; 1000 cc Honda	Cancelled; No Time	17' 38.66; 128.302 mph	17' 41.02; 128.017 mph	17' 31.59; 129.164 mph	17' 23.51; 130.165 mph	17' 19.92; 130.614 mph
2	(England) John McGuinness; 1000 cc Honda	Cancelled; No Time	17' 48.76; 127.090 mph	18' 01.90; 125.546 mph	17' 22.89; 130.242 mph	18' 05.64; 125.113 mph	—— No Time
3	(Isle of Man) Conor Cummins; 1000 cc Kawasaki	Cancelled; No Time	18' 00.16; 125.748 mph	—— No Time	17' 49.43; 127.010 mph	17' 34.25; 128.838 mph	17' 29.63; 129.405 mph
4	(Northern Ireland) Adrian Archibald; 1000 cc Suzuki	Cancelled; No Time	17' 49.04; 127.056 mph	—— No Time	17' 36.06; 128.618 mph	18' 19.21; 123.569 mph	17' 30.00; 129.360 mph
5	(England) Guy Martin; 1000 cc Honda	Cancelled; No Time	17' 49.04; 127.056 mph	17' 51.61; 126.752 mph	17' 31.75; 129.145 mph	18' 21.84; 123.274 mph	17' 39.17; 128.240 mph
6	(Australia) Cameron Donald; 1000 cc Suzuki	Cancelled; No Time	17' 47.21; 127.274 mph	17' 47.73; 127.212 mph	17' 41.06; 128.011 mph	17' 34.27; 128.836 mph	17' 33.14; 128.974 mph
7	(Northern Ireland) Michael Dunlop; 1000 cc Honda	Cancelled; No Time	18' 11.89; 124.397 mph	18' 00.68; 125.668 mph	17' 56.49; 126.177 mph	17' 45.35; 127.496 mph	17' 34.63; 128.792 mph
8	(Scotland) Keith Amor; 1000 cc Honda	Cancelled; No Time	18' 26.21; 122.787 mph	17' 57.63; 126.043 mph	17' 41.78; 127.925 mph	17' 35.46; 128.691 mph	17' 37.14; 128.487 mph
9	(New Zealand) Bruce Anstey; 1000 cc Suzuki	Cancelled; No Time	17' 57.83; 126.020 mph	17' 50.20; 126.919 mph	17' 41.86; 127.915 mph	18' 41.01; 121.166 mph	17' 35.54; 128.682 mph
10	(England) Michael Rutter; 1000 cc Honda	Cancelled; No Time	—— No Time	—— No Time	—— No Time	17' 44.78; 127.564 mph	18' 18.38; 123.662 mph

==== Practice Times & Leaderboard Supersport Junior TT ====
Rank	Rider	Sat 29 May	Mon 31 May	Tues 1 June	Wed 2 June	Thurs 3 June	Fri 4 June
1	(Northern Ireland) Michael Dunlop; 600 cc Yamaha	Cancelled; No Time	18' 15.74; 123.960 mph	18' 26.74; 122.278 mph	18' 05.87; 125.087 mph	—— No Time	17' 54.63; 126.395 mph
2	(England) Ian Hutchinson; 1000 cc Honda	Cancelled; No Time	—— No Time	—— No Time	18' 06.45; 125.020 mph	18' 09.37; 124.684 mph	—— No Time
3	(Scotland) Keith Amor; 600 cc Honda	Cancelled; No Time	—— No Time	18' 27.45; 122.649 mph	—— No Time	18' 08.39; 124.797 mph	—— No Time
4	(England) Guy Martin; 600 cc Honda	Cancelled; No Time	18' 37.00; 121.600 mph	—— No Time	—— No Time	18' 16.25; 123.902 mph	—— No Time
5	(England) John McGuinness; 600 cc Honda	Cancelled; No Time	18' 49.18; 120.289 mph	—— No Time	18' 23.14; 123.128 mph	18' 40.03; 121.272 mph	18' 17.60; 123.750 mph
6	(Northern Ireland) William Dunlop; 600 cc Yamaha	Cancelled; No Time	18' 42.36; 121.020 mph	18' 38.07; 121.484 mph	18' 27.54; 122.639 mph	18' 58.70; 119.284 mph	18' 18.74; 123.621 mph
7	(Northern Ireland) Ryan Farquhar; 600 cc Kawasaki	Cancelled; No Time	—— No Time	—— No Time	—— No Time	18' 25.93; 122.818 mph	18' 43.78; 120.867 mph
8	(Isle of Man) Conor Cummins; 600 cc Kawasaki	Cancelled; No Time	—— No Time	18' 37.68; 121.527 mph	18' 28.31; 122.554 mph	—— No Time	—— No Time
9	(Northern Ireland) Adrian Archibald; 600 cc Yamaha	Cancelled; No Time	—— No Time	18' 52.27; 119.960 mph	18' 30.62; 122.300 mph	—— No Time	—— No Time
10	(New Zealand) Bruce Anstey; 600 cc Suzuki	Cancelled; No Time	—— No Time	—— No Time	18' 32.68; 122.072 mph	—— No Time	—— No Time

==== Practice Times and Leaderboard 600 cc Sidecar TT ====
Rank	Rider	Sat 29 May	Mon 31 May	Tues 1 June	Wed 2 June	Thurs 3 June	Fri 4 June
1	(Isle of Man) Dave Molyneux/ (England) Patrick Farrance; 600 cc DMR Kawasaki	Cancelled; No Time	20' 53.80; 108.333 mph	19' 47.77; 114.355 mph	19' 43.71; 114.748 mph	19' 36.36; 115.464 mph	22' 12.56; 101.930 mph
2	(Austria) Klaus Klaffenböck/ (Isle of Man) Dan Sayle; 600 cc LCR Honda	Cancelled; No Time	20' 15.35; 111.761 mph	20' 05.79; 112.647 mph	19' 55.92; 113.576 mph	19' 50.47; 114.096 mph	19' 56.64; 113.508 mph
3	(England) John Holden/ (England) Andrew Winkle; 600 cc LCR Suzuki	Cancelled; No Time	20' 17.36; 111.576 mph	20' 09.86; 112.267 mph	20' 04.82; 112.737 mph	20' 15.90; 111.710 mph	19' 59.43; 113.224 mph
4	(England) Simon Neary/ (England) Paul Knapton; 600 cc Honda	Cancelled; No Time	20' 24.08; 110.964 mph	20' 05.64; 112.661 mph	20' 11.98; 112.071 mph	20' 00.19; 113.172 mph	20' 01.41; 113.058 mph
5	(England) Conrad Harrison/ (England) Kerry Williams; 600 cc Honda	Cancelled; No Time	20' 50.30; 108.636 mph	20' 27.78; 110.629 mph	20' 25.77; 110.810 mph	20' 13.17; 111.962 mph	20' 29.39; 110.484 mph
6	(England) Tim Reeves/ (England) Dipash Chauhan; 600 cc Honda	Cancelled; No Time	—— No Time	20' 59.60; 107.834 mph	20' 45.81; 109.028 mph	20' 26.35; 110.758 mph	37' 03.92; 61.076 mph
7	(England) Gary Bryan/ (England) Gary Partridge; 600 cc Honda	Cancelled; No Time	21' 21.24; 106.013 mph	21' 09.41; 107.001 mph	20' 47.90; 108.845 mph	20' 27.35; 110.668 mph	20' 40.91; 109.459 mph
8	(England) Roy Hanks/ (England) Dave Wells; 600 cc Suzuki	Cancelled; No Time	21' 36.43; 104.771 mph	21' 05.27; 107.351 mph	20' 50.62; 108.608 mph	20' 27.93; 110.615 mph	—— No Time
9	(England) Tony Elmer/ (England) Darren Marshall; 600 cc Ireson Yamaha	Cancelled; No Time	21' 35.11; 108.877 mph	21' 02.66; 107.573 mph	20' 43.24; 109.253 mph	20' 28.72; 110.554 mph	20' 39.74; 109.562 mph
10	(England) Greg Lambert/ (Isle of Man) Jason Slous; 600 cc Honda	Cancelled; No Time	—— No Time	21' 19.63; 106.147 mph	20' 55.62; 108.176 mph	20' 42.98; 109.276 mph	25' 34.17; 88.535 mph

==== Practice Times & Leaderboard Superstock TT ====
Rank	Rider	Sat 29 May	Mon 31 May	Tues 1 June	Wed 2 June	Thurs 3 June	Fri 4 June
1	(Northern Ireland) Michael Dunlop; 1000 cc Honda	Cancelled; No Time	18' 08.28; 124.810 mph	18' 29.65; 122.406 mph	—— No Time	17' 48.58; 127.111 mph	17' 38.48; 128.324 mph
2	(Scotland) Keith Amor; 1000 cc BMW	Cancelled; No Time	18' 36.92; 121.610 mph	—— No Time	17' 45.11; 127.525 mph	—— No Time	17' 39.26; 128.229 mph
3	(Northern Ireland) Ryan Farquhar; 1000 cc Kawasaki	Cancelled; No Time	17' 51.21; 126.799 mph	—— No Time	17' 40.52; 128.076 mph	—— No Time	—— No Time
4	(England) Michael Rutter; 1000 cc Honda	Cancelled; No Time	18' 20.85; 123.385 mph	18' 02.91; 125.429 mph	18' 02.34; 125.495 mph	17' 44.78; 127.565 mph	—— No Time
5	(England) Guy Martin; 1000 cc Honda	Cancelled; No Time	18' 10.27; 124.582 mph	18' 12.58; 124.319 mph	17' 45.30; 127.503 mph	21' 38.73; 104.586 mph	—— No Time
6	(England) Ian Hutchinson; 1000 cc Honda	Cancelled; No Time	—— No Time	17' 55.11; 126.339 mph	—— No Time	—— No Time	18' 02.15; 125.517 mph
7	(Wales) Ian Lougher; 1000 cc Kawasaki	Cancelled; No Time	18' 40.82; 121.186 mph	18' 40.32; 121.240 mph	17' 56.15; 126.216 mph	—— No Time	17' 56.53; 126.173 mph
8	(Australia) Cameron Donald; 1000 cc Suzuki	Cancelled; No Time	18' 32.73; 122.068 mph	18' 43.63; 120.883 mph	17' 57.90; 126.012 mph	—— No Time	—— No Time
7	(Isle of Man) Conor Cummins; 1000 cc Kawasaki	Cancelled; No Time	18' 20.22; 123.456 mph	17' 59.61; 125.812 mph	—— No Time	18' 07.29; 124.924 mph	18' 03.87; 125.318 mph
10	(England) John McGuinness; 1000 cc Honda	Cancelled; No Time	18' 10.79; 124.523 mph	18' 59.65; 119.184 mph	18' 06.86; 124.973 mph	—— No Time	18' 00.54; 125.704 mph

=== Race results ===
==== 2010 Superbike TT final standings. ====
5 June 2010 6 Laps (236.38 Miles) TT Mountain Course.

Rank	Rider	Team	Speed	Time
1	(England) Ian Hutchinson	Honda 1000 cc	127.502 mph	1:46.31.82
2	(Northern Ireland) Michael Dunlop	Honda 1000 cc	126.828 mph	1:47.05.75
3	(Australia) Cameron Donald	Suzuki 1000 cc	126.638 mph	1:47.15.40
4	(England) Guy Martin	Honda 1000 cc	126.586 mph	1:47.18.05
6	(Northern Ireland) Adrian Archibald	Suzuki 1000 cc	126.586 mph	1:47.18.05
6	(Scotland) Keith Amor	Honda 1000 cc	126.467 mph	1:47.24.11
7	(Wales) Ian Lougher	Kawasaki 1000 cc	124.895 mph	1:48.45.20
8	(England) Michael Rutter	Honda 1000 cc	123.997 mph	1:49.32.47
9	(England) Daniel Stewart	Honda 1000 cc	123.438 mph	1:50.02.24
10	(Northern Ireland) Ryan Farquhar	Kawasaki 1000 cc	123.428 mph	1:50.02.81

Fastest Lap and New Class Record': Conor Cummins – 131.511 mph (17' 12.83) on lap 1.

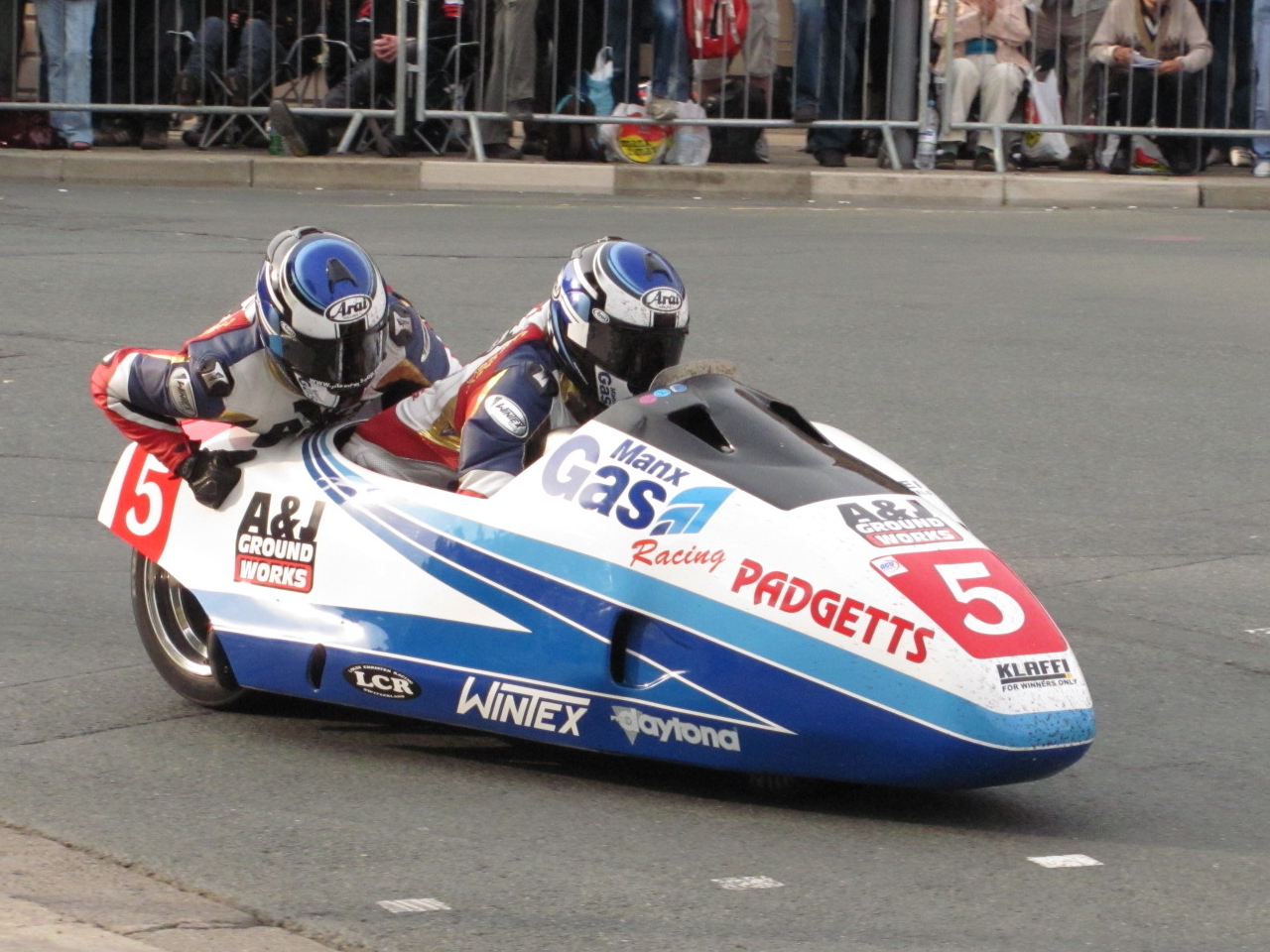
Sidecar TT Race A winners Klaus Klaffenböck and Dan Sayle

==== 2010 Sidecar TT Race 'A' TT final standings ====
5 June 2010 3 Laps (113.00 Miles) TT Mountain Course.

Rank	Rider	Team	Speed	Time
1	(Austria) Klaus Klaffenböck/ (Isle of Man) Dan Sayle	600 cc LCR Honda	114.410 mph	59’ 21.61
2	(Isle of Man) Dave Molyneux/ (England) Patrick Farrance	600 cc DMR Kawasaki	114.326 mph	59’ 24.24
3	(England) Tim Reeves/ (England) Dipash Chauhan	Honda 600 cc	112.676 mph	1:00.16.41
4	(England) Simon Neary/ (England) Paul Knapton	LCR Honda 600 cc	112.344 mph	1:00.27.12
5	(England) Tony Elmer/ (England) Darren Marshall	Ireson Yamaha 600 cc	110.178 mph	1:01.38.41
6	(England) Gary Bryan/ (England) Gary Partridge	Honda 600 cc	110.027 mph	1:01.43.49
7	(England) Greg Lambert/ (Isle of Man) Jason Slous	Honda 600 cc	108.980 mph	1:02.19.07
8	(England) Bill Currie/ (England) Robert Biggs	Yamaha 600 cc	107.944 mph	1:02.54.96
9	(England) David Kimberley/ (England) Robert Bell	Ireson Honda 600 cc	107.025 mph	1:03.27.37
10	(Scotland) Gordon Shand/Stuart Graham	Suzuki 600 cc	106.506 mph	1:03.45.92

Fastest Lap: Dave Molyneux/Patrick Farrance – 115.284 mph (19' 38.20) on lap 3.

==== 2010 Supersport Junior TT Race 1 ====
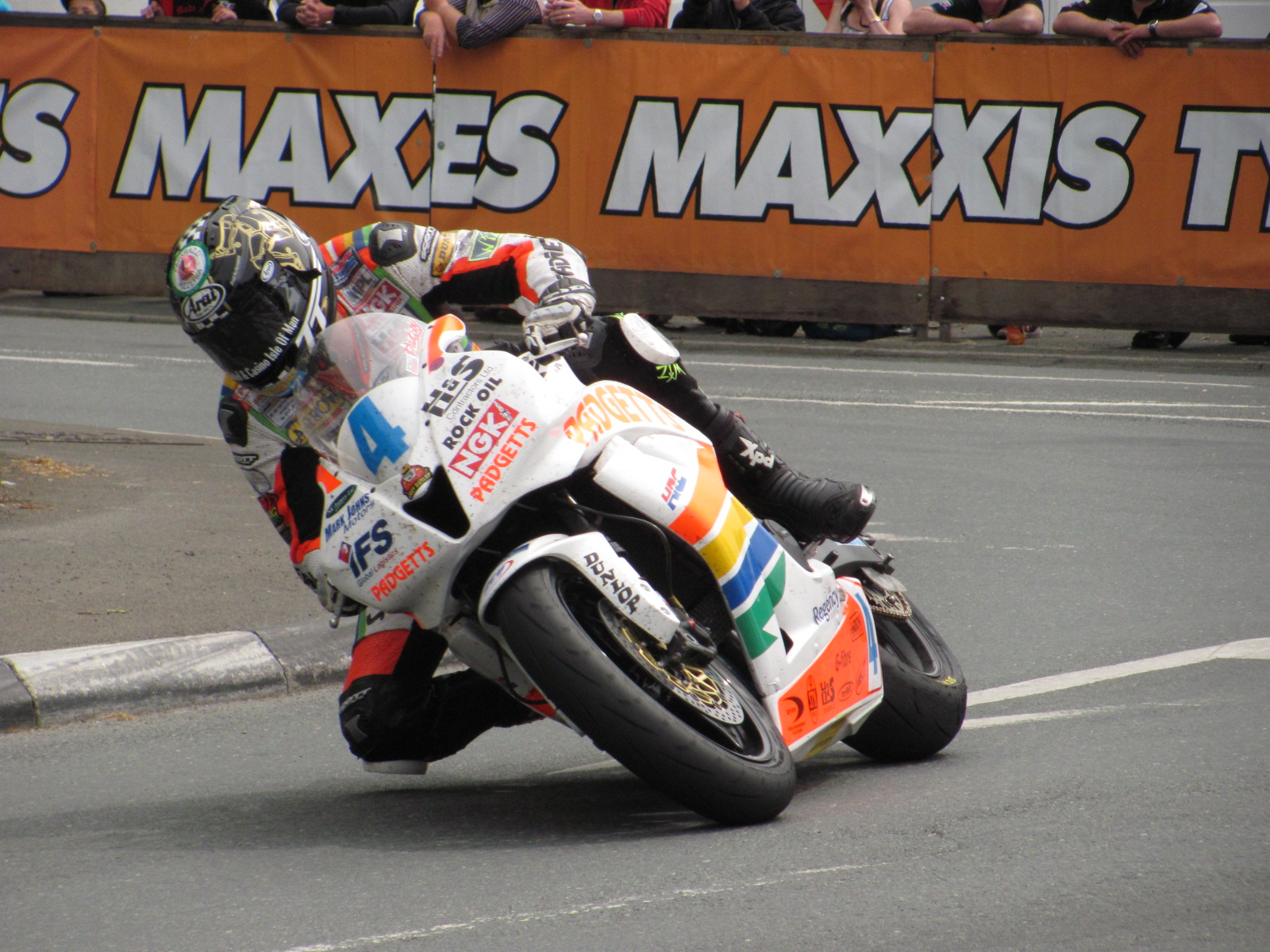
Supersport Race 1 winner Ian Hutchinson

7 June 2010 4 Laps (150.73 Miles) TT Mountain Course.

Rank	Rider	Team	Speed	Time
1	(England) Ian Hutchinson	Honda 600 cc	124.667 mph	1:12.37.75
2	(England) Guy Martin	Honda 600 cc	124.591 mph	1:12.40.78
3	(Northern Ireland) Michael Dunlop	Yamaha 600 cc	124.264 mph	1:12.52.24
4	(Scotland) Keith Amor	Honda 600 cc	123.773 mph	1:13.09.59
5	(Isle of Man) Dan Kneen	Yamaha 600 cc	123.314 mph	1:13.25.92
6	(Northern Ireland) William Dunlop	Yamaha 600 cc	123.066 mph	1:13.34.81
7	(England) John McGuinness	Honda 600 cc	122.861 mph	1:13.42.17
8	(Isle of Man) Conor Cummins	Kawasaki 600 cc	122.685 mph	1:13.48.51
9	(Northern Ireland) Ryan Farquhar	Kawasaki 600 cc	122.507 mph	1:13.54.95
10	(Australia) Cameron Donald	Suzuki 600 cc	121.519 mph	1:14.30.99

Fastest Lap and New Lap Record: Keith Amor – 126.909 mph (17' 50.28) on lap 4.

==== 2010 Superstock TT final standings. ====
7 June 2010 4 Laps (150.73 Miles) TT Mountain Course.

Rank	Rider	Team	Speed	Time
1	(England) Ian Hutchinson	Honda 1000 cc	128.100 mph	1:10.41.31
2	(Northern Ireland) Ryan Farquhar	Kawasaki 1000 cc	128.060 mph	1:10.42.63
3	(Isle of Man) Conor Cummins	Kawasaki 1000 cc	127.117 mph	1:11.14.12
4	(England) John McGuinness	Honda 1000 cc	126.472 mph	1:11.35.92
5	(England) Guy Martin	Honda 1000 cc	126.057 mph	1:11.50.06
6	(Scotland) Keith Amor	BMW 1000 cc	126.051 mph	1:11.50.25
7	(Wales) Ian Lougher	Kawasaki 1000 cc	125.448 mph	1:12.10.97
8	(Northern Ireland) Michael Dunlop	Honda 1000 cc	124.939 mph	1:12.28.63
9	(England) Michael Rutter	Honda 1000 cc	124.819 mph	1:12.32.78
10	(Northern Ireland) Adrian Archibald	Suzuki 1000 cc	124.525 mph	1:12.43.08

Fastest Lap and New Lap Record: Ian Hutchinson – 130.741 mph (17' 18.91) on lap 4.

==== 2010 Sidecar TT Race 'B' TT final standings ====
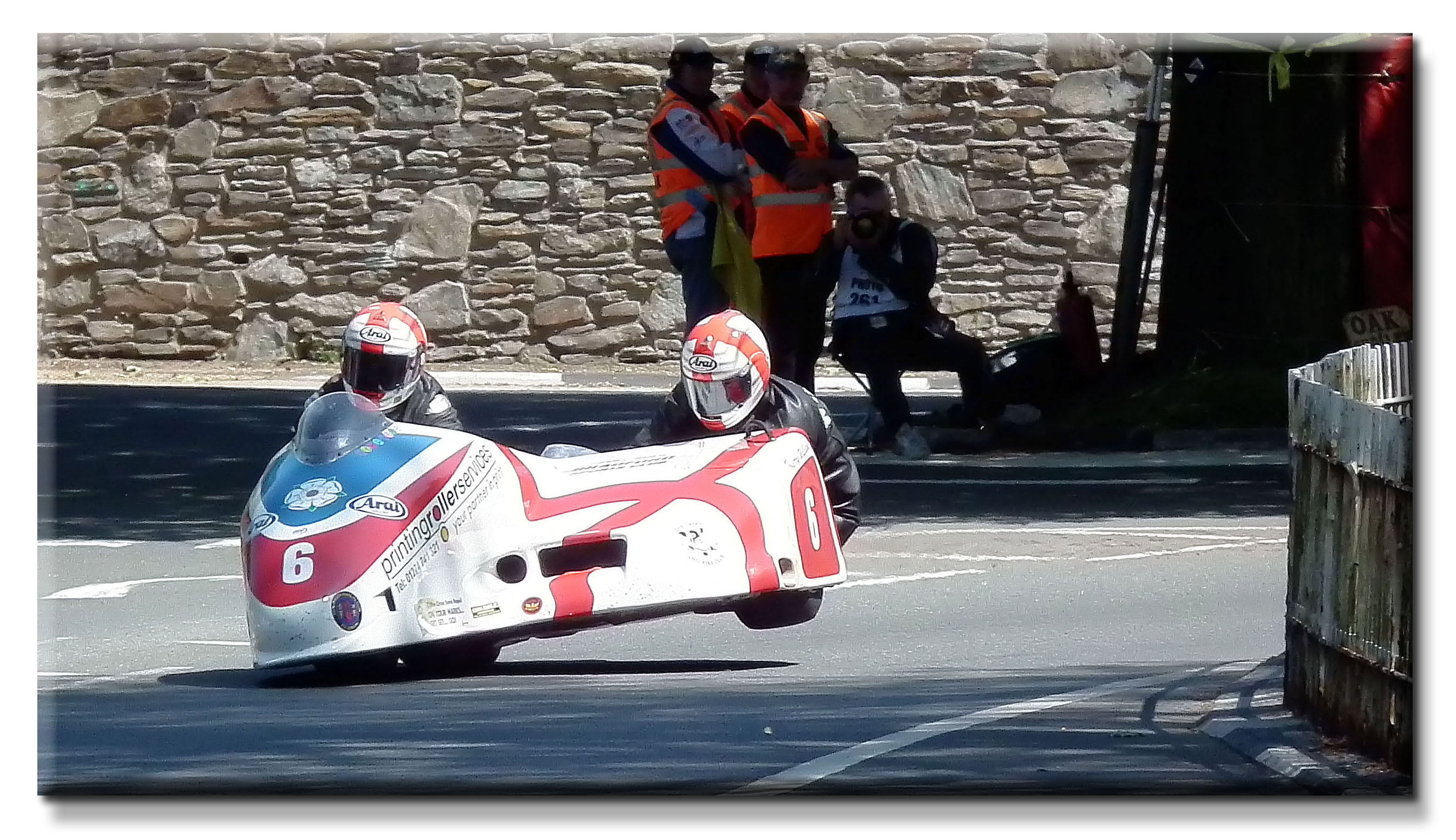
Third place finishers Conrad Harrison and Kerry Williams

10 June 2010 3 Laps (113.00 Miles) TT Mountain Course.

Rank	Rider	Team	Speed	Time
1	(Austria) Klaus Klaffenböck/ (Isle of Man) Dan Sayle	600 cc LCR Honda	113.431 mph	59’ 52.35
2	(England) John Holden/ (England) Andrew Winkle	600 cc LCR Suzuki	113.396 mph	59’ 53.47
3	(England) Conrad Harrison/ (England) Kerry Williams	Honda 600 cc	110.962 mph	1:01.12.29
4	(England) Gary Bryan/ (England) Gary Partridge	Honda 600 cc	109.105 mph	1:002.14.77
5	(England) Greg Lambert/ (Isle of Man) Jason Slous	Honda 600 cc	108.362 mph	1:002.40.38
6	(England) Roy Hanks/ (England) Gary Partridge	Suzuki 600 cc	108.257 mph	1:02.44.03
7	(England) Robert Handcock/ (England) Mike Aylott	Honda 600 cc	107.291 mph	1:03.17.92
8	(England) David Kimberley/ (England) Robert Bell	Ireson Honda 600 cc	106.996 mph	1:03.28.39
9	(Scotland) Gordon Shand/Stuart Graham	Suzuki 600 cc	106.437 mph	1:03.48.42
10	(Isle of Man) Brian Kelly/ (Isle of Man) Dicky Gale	DMR Honda 600 cc	105.139 mph	1:04.35.68

Fastest Lap: Klaus Klaffenböck/Dan Sayle – 114.157 mph (19' 49.84) on lap 3.

==== 2010 Supersport Junior TT Race 2 ====
10 June 2010 4 Laps (150.73 Miles) TT Mountain Course.

Rank	Rider	Team	Speed	Time
1	(England) Ian Hutchinson	Honda 600 cc	125.161 mph	1:12.20.89
2	(Northern Ireland) Michael Dunlop	Yamaha 600 cc	125.120 mph	1:12.22.34
3	(Scotland) Keith Amor	Honda 600 cc	124.180 mph	1:12.55.19
4	(England) Guy Martin	Honda 600 cc	124.035 mph	1:13.00.31
5	(England) John McGuinness	Honda 600 cc	123.098 mph	1:13.33.64
6	(Isle of Man) Conor Cummins	Kawasaki 600 cc	123.092 mph	1:13.33.87
7	(Northern Ireland) William Dunlop	Yamaha 600 cc	122.751 mph	1:13.46.12
8	(New Zealand) Bruce Anstey	Suzuki 600 cc	122.031 mph	1:14.12.16
9	(Northern Ireland) Ryan Farquhar	Kawasaki 600 cc	121.929 mph	1:14.15.97
10	(Isle of Man) Dan Kneen	Yamaha 600 cc	121.654 mph	1:14.26.04

Fastest Lap and New Lap Record: Michael Dunlop – 127.836 mph (17' 42.52) on lap 4.

==== 2010 TT Zero Race ====
The inaugural TT Zero race was held in 2010. The class is for racing motorcycles "powered without the use of carbon based fuels and have zero toxic/noxious emissions."

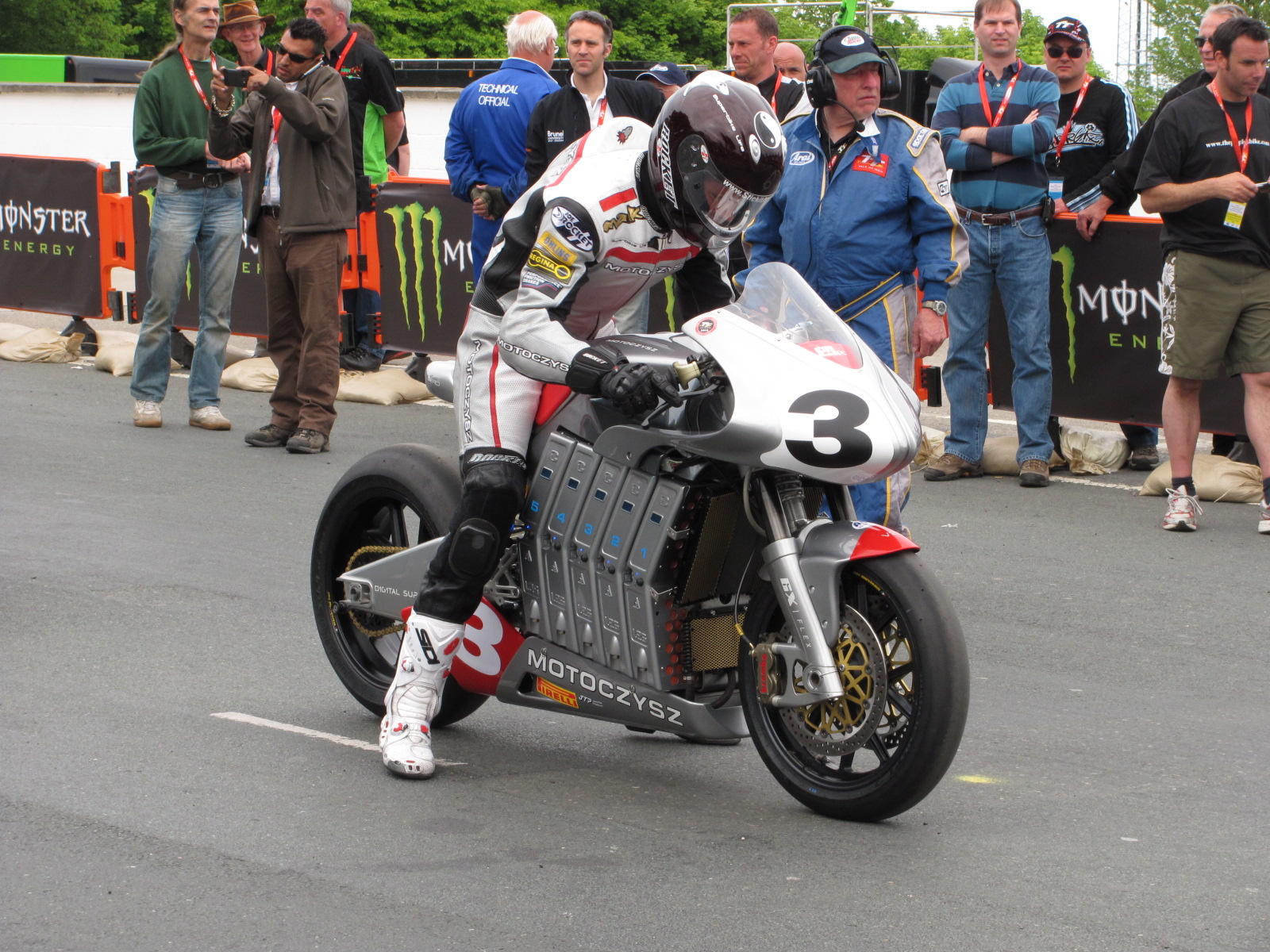
TT Zero winner Mark Miller

10 June 2010 1 Lap (37.773 Miles) TT Mountain Course

Rank	Rider	Team	Speed	Time
1	(United States) Mark Miller	MotoCzysz E1pc / MotoCzysz	96.820 mph	23' 22.89
2	(England) Robert Barber	Agni / AGNI Racing	89.290 mph	25' 21.19
3	(England) James McBride	Man TTX / Man TTX Racing	88.653 mph	25' 32.13
4	(England) Jennifer Tinmouth	Agni / AGNI Racing	88.228 mph	25' 39.50
5	(Scotland) George Spence	Peter Williams / Kingston University	64.705 mph	34' 59.19

Fastest Lap and New Lap Record:Mark Miller – 96.820 mph (23' 22.89) on lap 1.

==== 2010 Senior TT final standings. ====
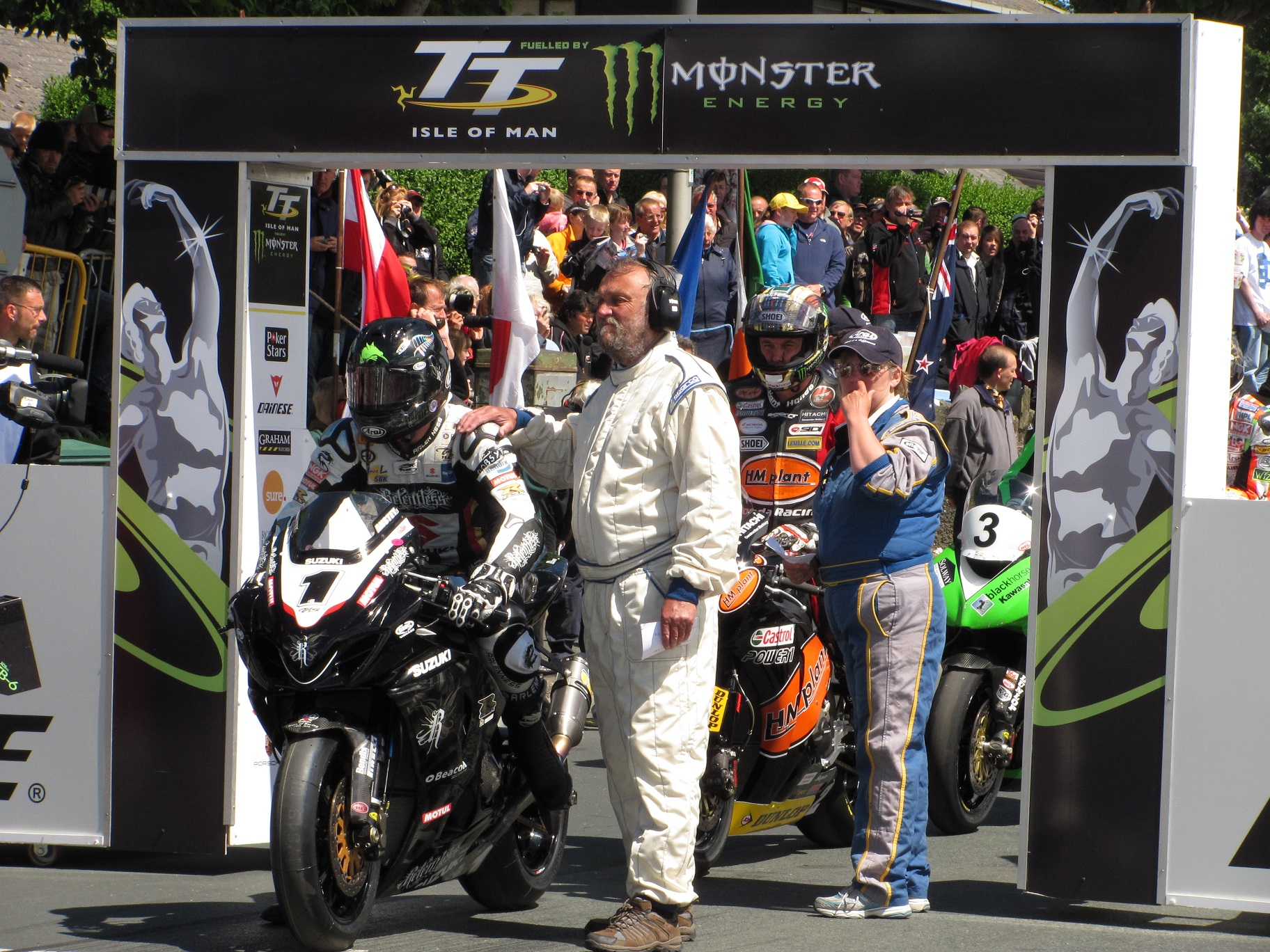
Bruce Anstey at the start of the Senior TT

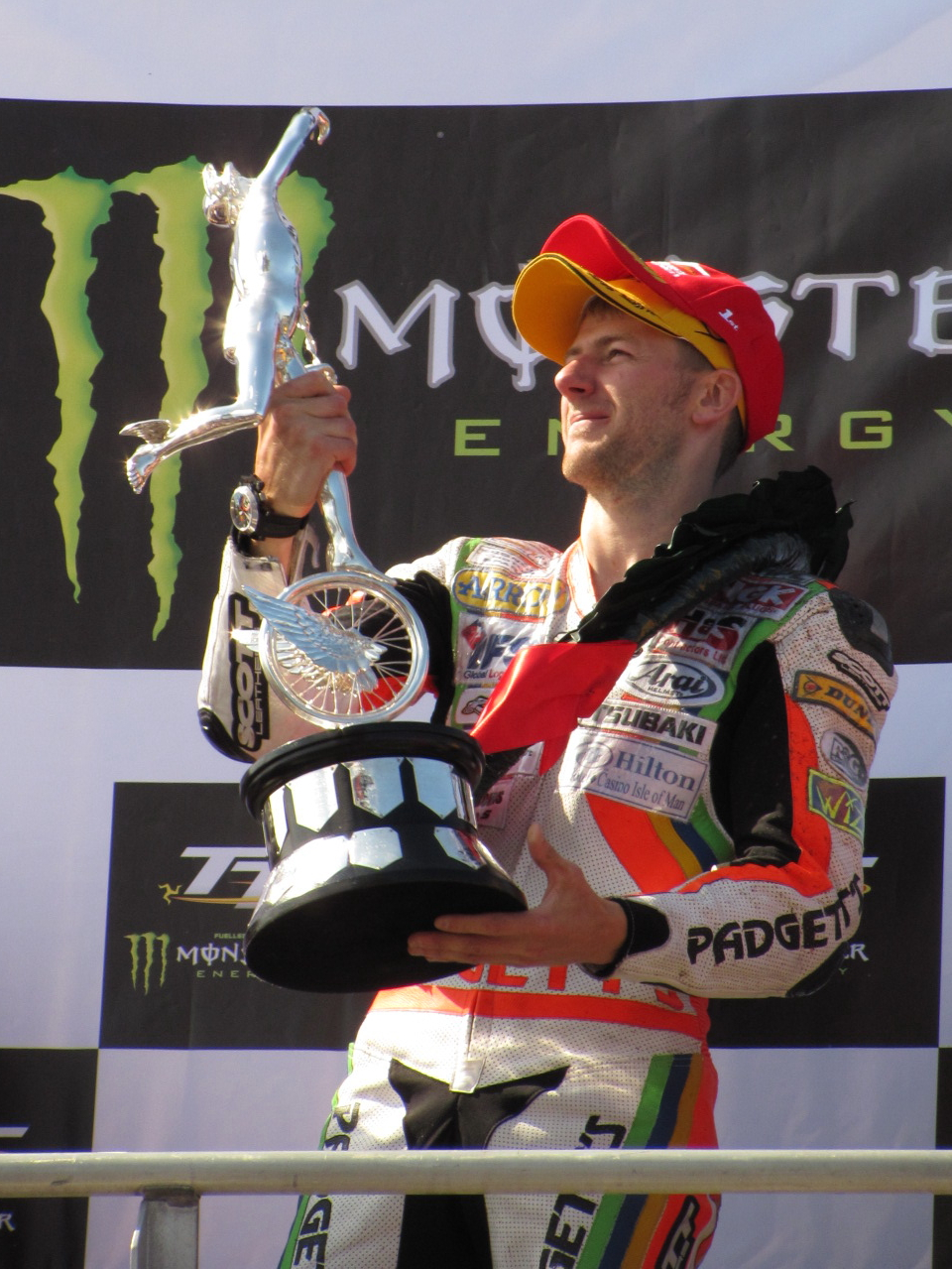
Ian Hutchinson after winning the Senior TT

11 June 2010 4 Laps (150.73 Miles) TT Mountain Course (Reduced Race Distance).

Rank	Rider	Team	Speed	Time
1	(England) Ian Hutchinson	Honda 1000 cc	128.607 mph	1:10.24.59
2	(Northern Ireland) Ryan Farquhar	Kawasaki 1000 cc	127.467 mph	1:11.02.36
3	(New Zealand) Bruce Anstey	Suzuki 1000 cc	126.408 mph	1:11.38.08
4	(Wales) Ian Lougher	Kawasaki 1000 cc	125.721 mph	1:12.01.57
5	(England) Michael Rutter	Honda 1000 cc	125.455 mph	1:12.10.74
6	(England) Daniel Stewart	Honda 1000 cc	124.797 mph	1:12.33.57
7	(Northern Ireland) Adrian Archibald	Suzuki 1000 cc	124.675 mph	1:12.37.82
8	(Isle of Man) Dan Kneen	Suzuki 1000 cc	123.220 mph	1:13.29.30
9	(Northern Ireland) Davy Morgan	Suzuki 1000 cc	122.894 mph	1:13.40.98
10	(England) James McBride	Yamaha 1000 cc	122.625 mph	1:13.50.69

Fastest Lap: Ian Hutchinson – 131.487 mph (17' 13.01) on lap 1.

=== 2010 Isle of Man TT Championship Points Standings ===
==== 2010 Joey Dunlop TT Champion Trophy ====
Pos	Rider	Superbike	Supersport 1	Superstock	Supersport 2	Senior TT	Pts
1	(England) Ian Hutchinson	25	25	25	25	25	125
2	(Northern Ireland) Michael Dunlop	20	16	8	20		64
3	(Northern Ireland) Ryan Farquhar	6	7	20	7	20	60
4	(England) Guy Martin	13	20	11	13		57
5	(Scotland) Keith Amor	10	13	10	16		49
6	(Wales) Ian Lougher	9	4	9	2	13	37
7	(Isle of Man) Conor Cummins		8	16	10		34
8	(England) John McGuinness		9	13	11		33
9	(Australia) Cameron Donald	16	6	5	3		30
10	(Isle of Man) Dan Kneen	4	11	1	6	8	30
11	(Northern Ireland) Adrian Archibald	11		6	4	9	30
12	(New Zealand) Bruce Anstey	5			8	16	29
13	(England) Michael Rutter	8		7		11	26
14	(Northern Ireland) William Dunlop		10		9		19
15	(England) Daniel Stewart	7				10	17
16	(England) Gary Johnson		5	3	5	2	15
17	(Northern Ireland) Davy Morgan	2				7	9
18	(England) James McBride		2			6	8
19	(United States) Jimmy Moore				1	5	6
20	(England) James Hillier		2	4			6
21	(England) Ian Mackman	3				3	6
22	(Germany) Rico Penzkofer					4	4
23	(Republic of Ireland) Derek Brien		3				3
24	(Northern Ireland) John Burrows					1	1
25	(Isle of Man) Stephen Oates	1					1
26	(England) Ben Wylie		1				1
Pos	Rider	Superbike	Supersport 1	Superstock	Supersport 2	Senior TT	Pts

==== 2010 TT Privateers Championship ====
Pos	Rider	Superbike	Supersport 1	Superstock	Supersport 2	Senior TT	Pts
1	(England) James McBride	11	13	25	11	20	80
2	(United States) Jimmy Moore	16		13	25	16	70
3	(Northern Ireland) Davy Morgan	25		11		25	61
4	(Republic of Ireland) Derek Brien		25	1	20		46
5	(Italy) Stefano Bonetti		7	16	6	10	39
6	(England) Ben Wylie	6	20		11		37
7	(Isle of Man) Stephen Oates	20	6	10			35
8	(England) Oliver Linsdell		16		16		32
9	(New Zealand) Paul Dobbs	13	8	9			30
10	(Portugal) Luis Carreira	9		20			29
11	(Spain) Antonio Maeso	8		8	3	9	28
12	(Australia) David Johnson*	4		5	5	13	27
13	(England) Ian Pattinson	10	5	3	9		27
14	(England) Chris Palmer		11		10		21
15	(England) David Hewson	7		4	1	8	20
16	(Republic of Ireland) Roger Maher		2		8	7	17
17	(England) Steve Mercer	5				11	16
18	(England) Paul Shoesmith	2		6		6	14
19	(Northern Ireland) Stephen Mcllvenna		9		4		13
20	(England) Jim Hodson	1	1		7	2	11
21	(Wales) Paul Owen		10				10
22	(England) Michael Russell		3		5		8
23	(England) Kiaran Hanklin			7			7
24	(South Africa) Hudson Kennaugh*					5	5
25	(Northern Ireland) Stephen Thompson*					4	4
26	(England) Rob Barber	3			2		3
27	(Republic of Ireland) Brian McCormack*					3	5
28	(Czech Republic) Michal Dokoupil		4				4
29	(Spain) Sergio Romero			2			2
30	(Isle of Man) David Madsen-Mygdal					1	1
31	(England) Roy Richardson		1				1
Pos	Rider	Superbike	Supersport 1	Superstock	Supersport 2	Senior TT	Pts

- *denotes newcomer

== Bibliography ==
- "Island Racer 2010: The Ultimate Fans' Guide". Island Racer. Mortons Media Group. 2010 – via Kelsey Publishing.
