= Paul Dobbs =

New Zealand motorcycle racer

- Dobbs with an historic-class Norton-based race machine
- Nationality: New Zealand
- Born: 5 October 1970
- Died: 10 June 2010 (aged 39)
Motorcycle racing career statistics
Isle of Man TT career
TTs contested	11 (1999–2000, 2002–2010)
TT wins	0
TT podiums	0

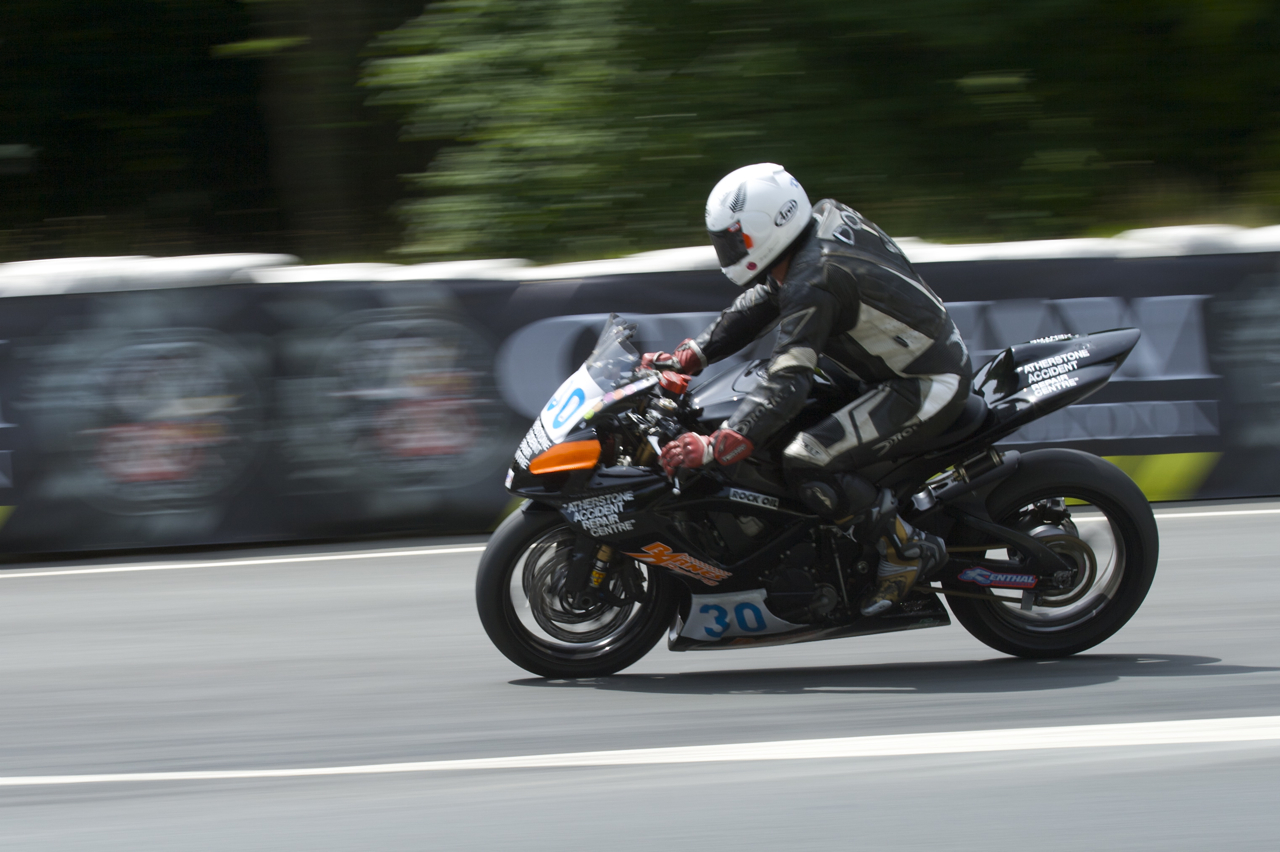
Dobbs racing in the 2009 Supersport TT race 1 slowing to enter Governor's Bridge, close to the end of the lap

Paul Dobbs (5 October 1970 – 10 June 2010) was a motorcycle road racer and development test rider from New Zealand. He first competed in the Isle of Man TT races in 1999.

== Racing career ==
Dobbs' motorcycle racing career included a first place in the Australian 400 Class and Formula 3 in New South Wales in 1997. He competed in the 1998 Australian Championships, finishing second and fourth in Class.

In his first attempt at the TT races in 1999, Dobbs was awarded the best newcomer in the Lightweight 400 Race. His best finish was sixth in the 400 cc lightweight division of the 2000 races.

== Death ==
Dobbs died in a racing accident at Ballagarey, while competing in the Supersport TT race 2 in 2010.

== 3D documentary Closer to the Edge ==
The 3D film UK documentary TT3D: Closer to the Edge shot at the 2010 Isle of Man TT races features his wife Bridget Dobbs talking about her husband 'Dobsy' and the races.
