= Klaus Klaffenböck =

Austrian motorcycle racer

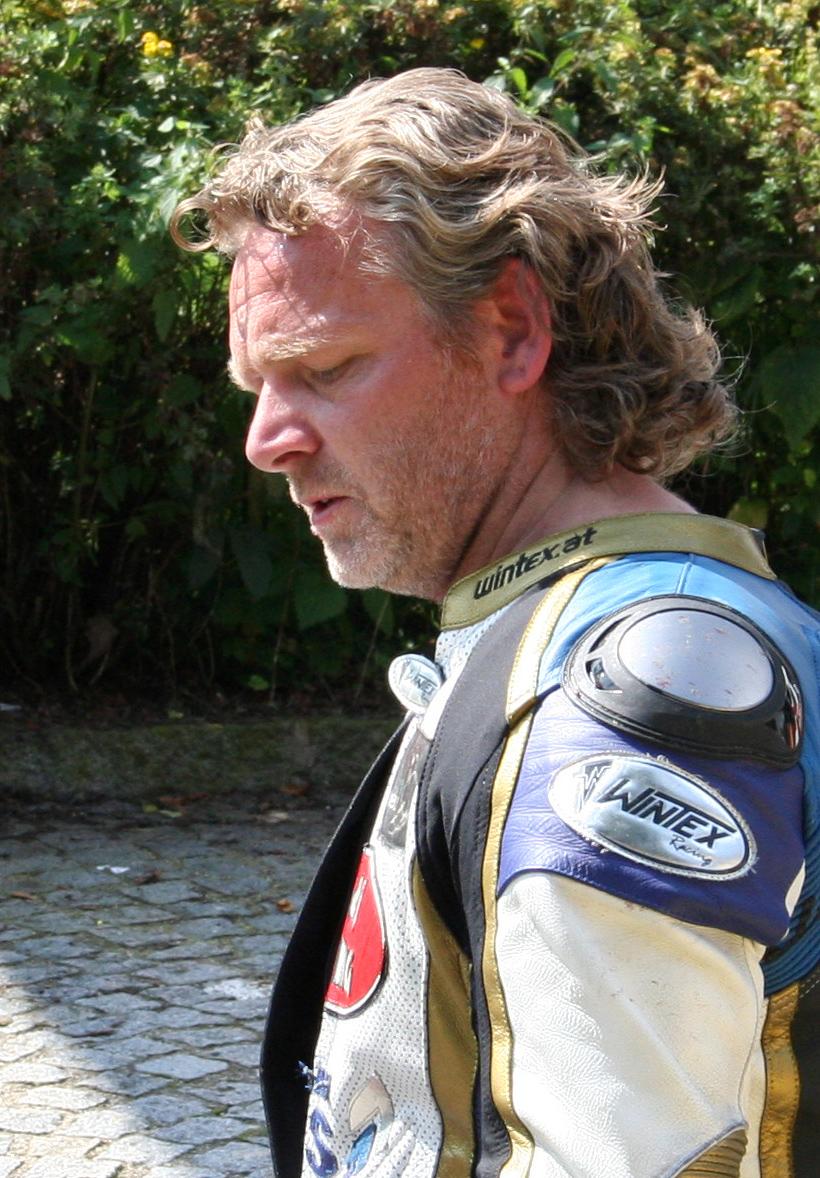
- Nationality: Austrian
Motorcycle racing career statistics
Isle of Man TT career
TTs contested	7 (2005–present)
TT wins	3
First TT win	2010 Sidecar TT Race A
Last TT win	2011 Sidecar TT Race A
TT podiums	3

Klaus Klaffenböck (born 24 July 1968 in Peuerbach, Austria) is an Austrian World Champion in the FIM World Sidecar Championship, and former team-principal of Klaffi Honda World Superbike squad running Alex Barros, Frankie Chili and Max Neukirchner.

After winning the 2001 World Sidecar Championship with passenger Christian Parzer with a LCR Suzuki sidecar, Klaffenböck now competes at the Isle of Man TT Races. After winning the 2010 Sidecar TT Race 'A', he became the first Austrian winner of an Isle of Man TT race since Rupert Hollaus in the 1954 Ultra-Lightweight TT.

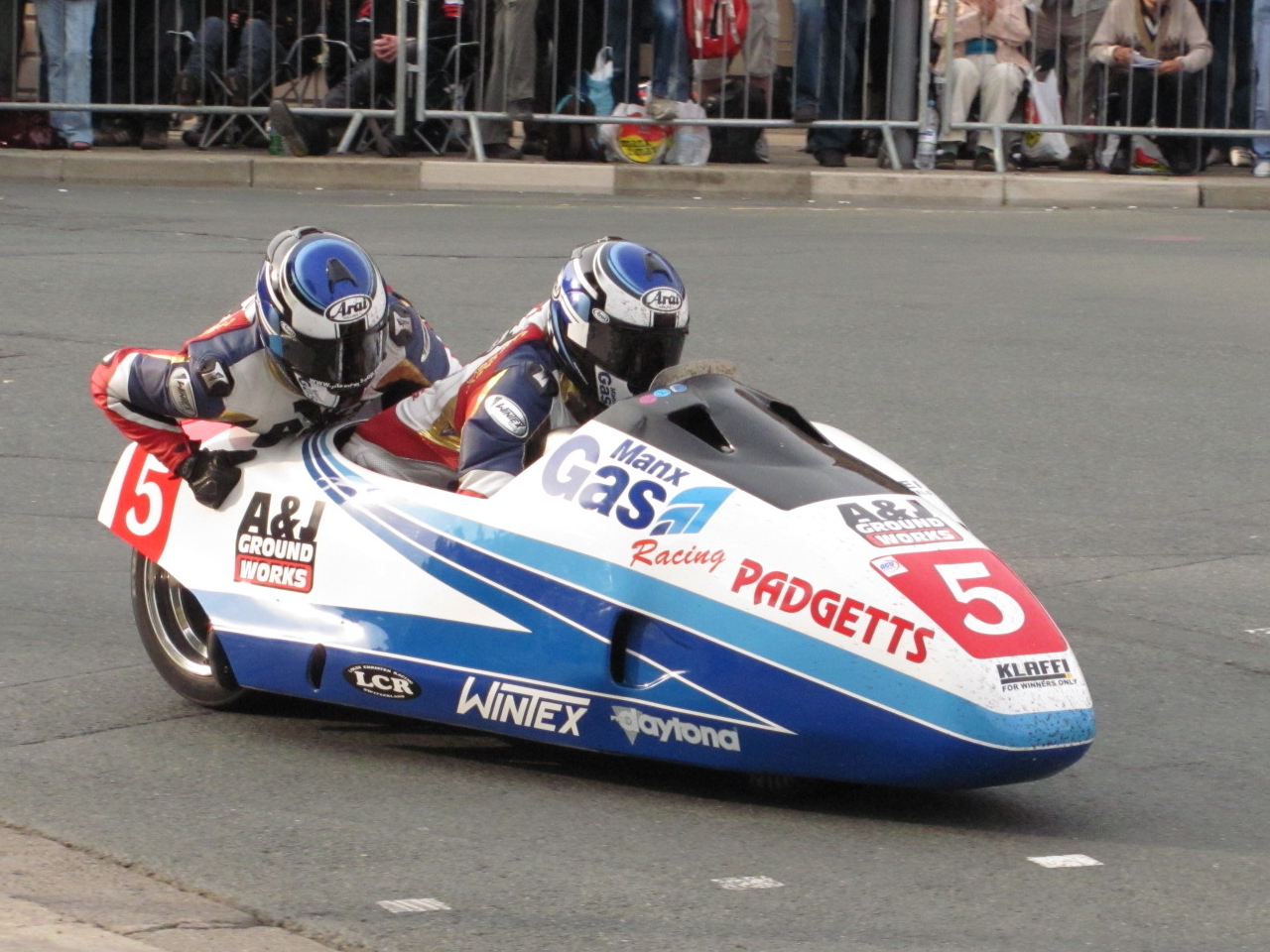
Klaffenböck and passenger Dan Sayle en route to victory in Sidecar Race A at the 2010 Isle of Man TT on LCR outfit

Sporting positions
Preceded by Steve Webster; Paul Woodhead	World Sidecar Champion (with Christian Parzer); 2001	Succeeded by Steve Abbott; Jamie Biggs
