= TT3D: Closer to the Edge =

2011 British documentary film by Richard De Aragues

- Theatrical release poster
- Directed by: Richard De Aragues
- Produced by: Steve Christian; Marc Samuelson
- Starring: Guy Martin; Ian Hutchinson
- Narrated by: Jared Leto
- Cinematography: Thomas Kürzl
- Edited by: Beverley Mills
- Music by: Andy Gray
- Production companies: Isle of Man Film; CinemaNX
- Release date: 22 April 2011
- Running time: 104 minutes
- Country: United Kingdom
- Language: English
- Box office: $2,036,488 (UK)

TT3D: Closer to the Edge is a British documentary film by first time director Richard de Aragues. The film is narrated by Jared Leto and charts the Isle of Man TT motorcycle race that takes place on the Isle of Man every year. It follows the leading riders in the 2010 race, most notably Guy Martin and Ian Hutchinson.

It was shot in 3D, and charts the racers' dedication and the risks involved in their bid to become King of the Mountain. The film was released to the public in 2011 to critical acclaim and was a financial success. Grossing $2 million, it is the seventh highest-grossing documentary in the United Kingdom.

== Synopsis ==
The film charts the build up to the 2010 races, and then documents each of the races and their results. These take place along public roads through the Isle of Man, covering 37.73 miles of terrain, and packed with thousands of spectators who have come from all over the world. Using 3D technology, Closer to the Edge captures the 2010 races and attempts to show what motivates the racers.

The film features several racers, including Guy Martin, John McGuinness, Conor Cummins, and Ian Hutchinson. McGuinness is the most successful living TT rider, having won the TT fifteen times. In 2009 Hutchinson won two TT's in one day, another road race, the North West 200, in Northern Ireland as well as competing every week at the top of the British Superstock Championship.

The film reveals how, for more than 100 years, riders have come to the Isle of Man to compete. The narration suggests that the TT has always called for a commitment far beyond any other racing event, and since the race began over 200 people have died in the races.

The second half of the film introduces Bridget Dobbs, mother of two and widow of Paul Dobbs ("Dobsy") who died in the 2010 races. Bridget understands and accepts that her husband, like many others, died doing something he loved. Despite the near fatal injuries, the film shows how those that survive all want to go back and do it again.

== Production ==
Directed by motorsports and commercial director Richard De Aragues, the film utilises a range of archive footage along with 3D technology and high definition equipment to capture the races. The director explained, "The TT has been filmed before, however, not until now have the tools existed that could do justice to those that have competed over the 37¾ miles that make up the legendary Mountain Circuit." TT3D: Closer To The Edge was produced by CinemaNX, the film production and distribution company backed by the Isle of Man Government. It was filmed in the Isle of Man, Northern Ireland, England, New Zealand and Los Angeles, California. In March 2011, it was announced that Jared Leto would narrate the film.

== Critical reception ==
TT3D: Closer to the Edge was universally acclaimed by critics, with a 100% fresh critical consensus on Rotten Tomatoes based on 18 reviews as of February 2012. Peter Bradshaw of The Guardian gave the film 4 stars out of 5 and stated that "It's a saturnalia of excitement, saturated with thrills and a sense of danger that is almost spiritual." Catherine Bray, writing for Film4, also gave the film a 4 out of 5, and called it "a thrilling, funny and moving human drama for pretty much everyone, not just biking enthusiasts." Graham Young of the Birmingham Post praised the film and wrote, "with history offering a fatality for every corner and more than five per mile, your heart will be in your mouth watching the likes of maverick rider Guy Martin go hell for leather in search of his dream of winning just one race." Philip De Semlyen of Empire gave the film 4 stars out of 5 and stated that the Isle of Man TT is pure cinema. Philip French of The Observer gave the film a positive review and wrote, "the speeds on such narrow, winding public roads are hair-raising and superbly photographed, the crashes spectacular and the riders far more likable than anyone involved in Formula One." Anthony Quinn of The Independent gave the film 5 stars out of 5 and wrote that "De Aragues never loses sight of the sport's high-risk stakes, where a mechanical glitch or tiny error of judgment might be the difference between life and death."

== Home media ==
A conventional (non-3D) transfer of the film was released in Australia on DVD in 2012 as TT Closer to the Edge by Icon Film Distribution Pty Ltd. This pack includes a separate disc of "extras", which includes interviews with Guy Martin, Manx motorcyclist Richard "Milky" Quayle, Paul Dobbs's widow Bridget Dobbs, the Irish motorsport photographer Stephen Davison, John McGuinness (also his father's home movies), Jenny Tinmouth, Nick Crowe, and Conor Cummins.
