= Jenny Tinmouth =

British motorcycle racer

- Nationality: English
- Born: 8 March 1978 (age 48); Chester, England
- Website: jennytinmouth.com
Motorcycle racing career statistics
Isle of Man TT career
TTs contested	2 (2009-2010)
TT wins	0
TT podiums	0

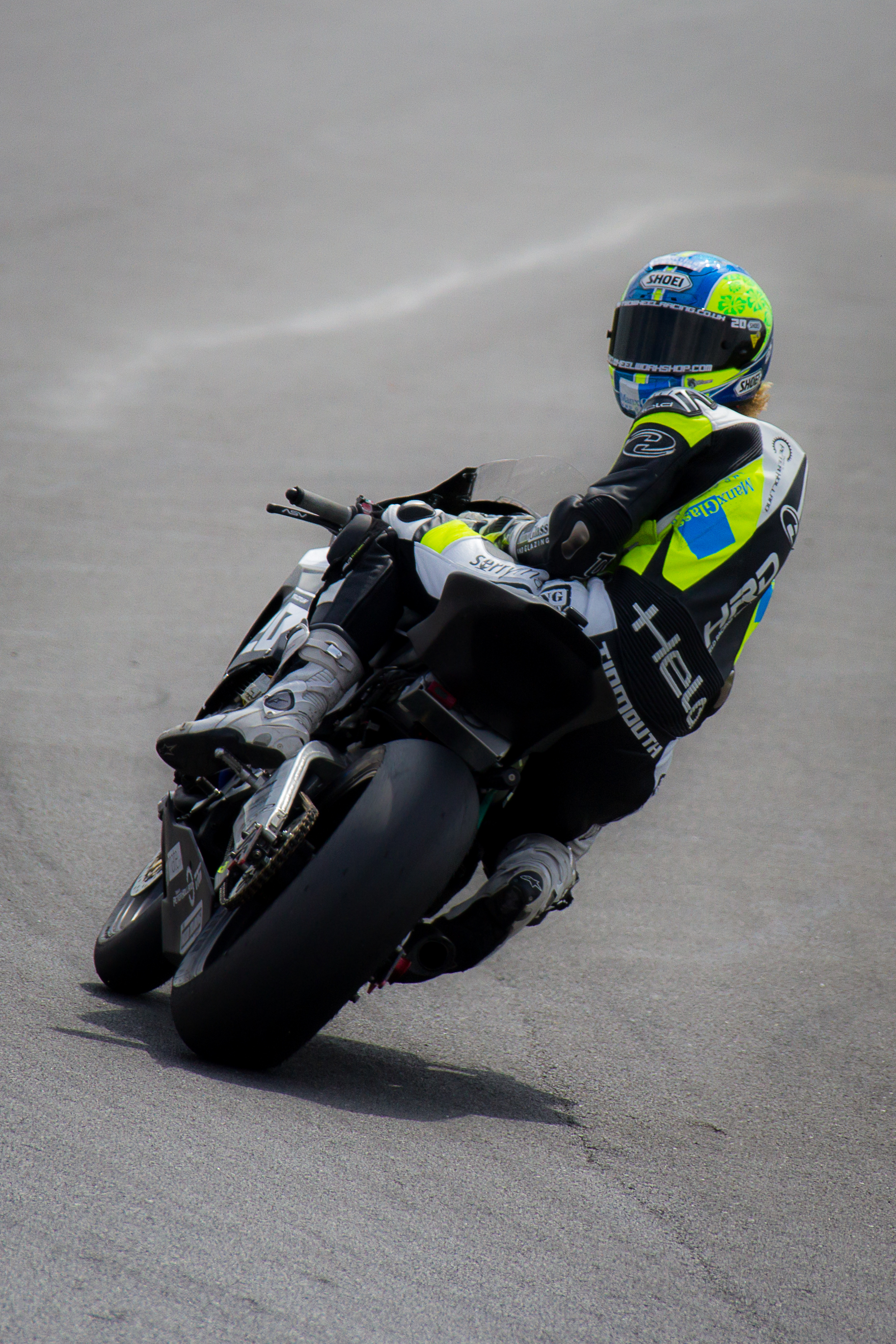
Tinmouth riding her Honda Superbike in 2014

Jennifer Rosanne Tinmouth (born 8 March 1978) is an English motorcycle racer. She is the current female Isle of Man TT lap record holder, breaking the record during her first ever TT in 2009 and gaining a Guinness World Record for this achievement. She then re-broke her own lap record during her second TT in 2010, with an average lap speed of 119.945 mph, gaining another Guinness World Record.

Tinmouth is also the first and only female competing in the British Superbike Championship, for which she received yet another Guinness World Record.

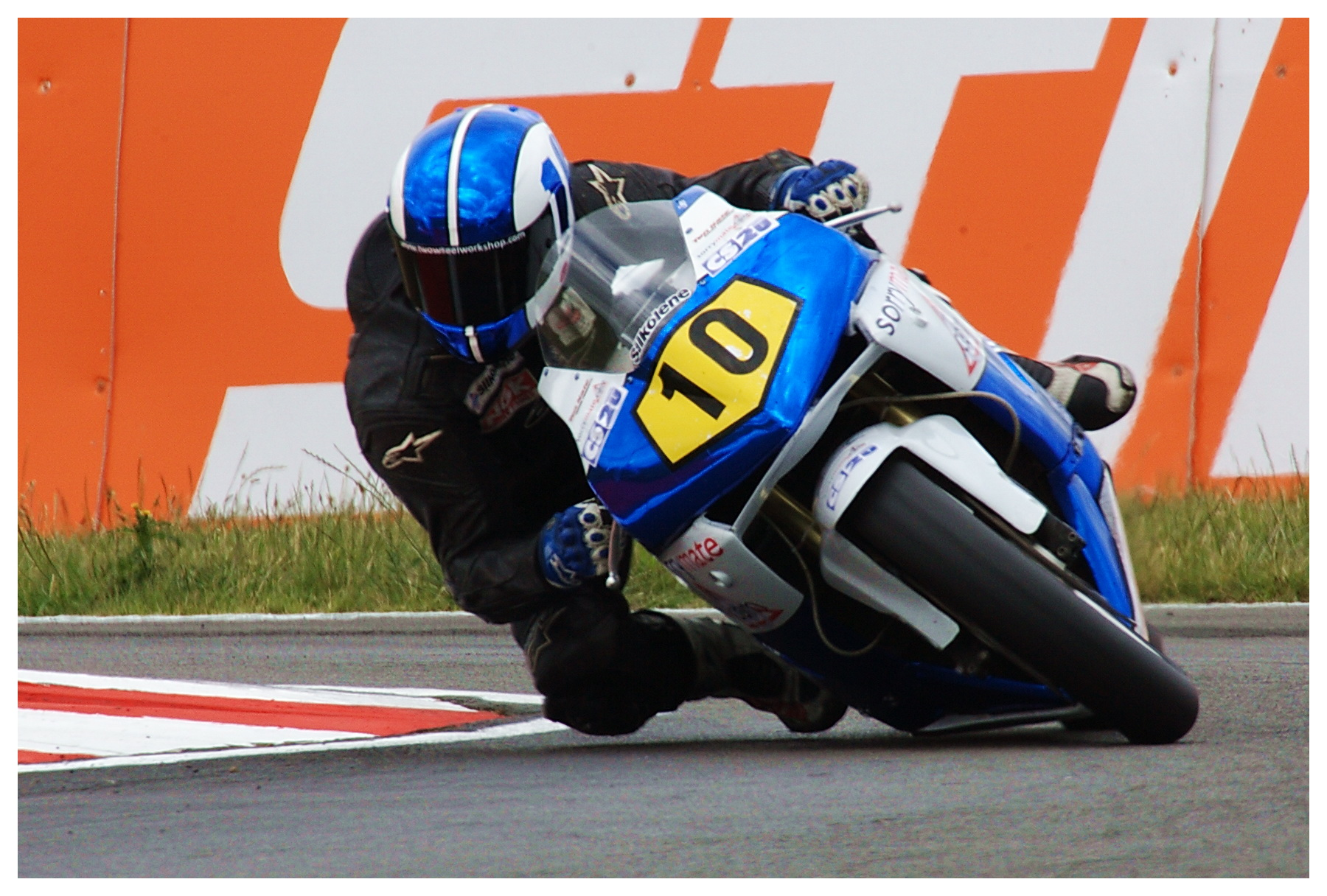
Tinmouth riding her Sorrymate.com Honda during the 2009 BSB championship at Snetterton

== Achievements ==
Tinmouth has achieved many firsts for women in the sport. She was the first female to enter and qualify to race in the British 125GP championship, the British Supersport and Supersport Cup Championships and the British Championship.

Tinmouth is the first female to lead and score points in a British Championship Race, the first to stand on the podium and the first to win a British Championship Race with a win in the Supersport Cup at Silverstone in 2010. She completed the 2010 championship with the most points and in previous years would have won the championship outright but with the new 2010 rules she was placed 3rd overall, the highest championship finishing place for a female competitor.

Tinmouth is the first British female to race in World Supersport and the first to race a full-blown superbike when she was invited to race for Rizla Suzuki in 2007 as a teammate to MotoGP rider Cal Crutchlow.

Tinmouth also won the first ever UK Electric Bike Racing (TTXgp) Championship in 2010 as well as finishing 3rd in the World Electric bike Racing Championship in the same year aboard her Agni Z2 and finished fourth in the TT Zero race during the 2010 Isle of Man TT.

In 2011, Tinmouth began racing a superbike full-time, entering the British Superbike Championship and racing for the Splitlath Motorsport Team. Tinmouth began her own British Superbike Team – Two Wheel Racing – in 2011, running under the name of her main sponsors Hardinge and Sorrymate.com, making her the first ever female British Superbike Team owner.

Tinmouth has achieved many accolades as well as her Guinness World Records. In 2012, she received The Women's International Film and Television Showcase International Visionary Awards 'IT Girl' award presented in Los Angeles for her commitment and dedication to her sport, citing her as an inspiration to women across the spectrum of all ages around the world. She also received the most Meritorious Performance by a Solo Newcomer Award at the TT in 2009 and the Susan Jenness Trophy in both 2009 and 2010 for the Most Meritorious Performance by a female competitor at the TT and has received two 'Your Champions' Sporting awards.

Tinmouth ran her own team, Two Wheel Racing, with the support of Manx Glass & Glazing Ltd, in the British Superbike Championship for 2013.

Tinmouth previously campaigned in some Thundersport GB rounds during 2013.

For the 2015 season, Tinmouth competed in the British Superbike Championship as part of the Honda Racing UK, with team-mates Jason O'Halloran and Dan Linfoot.

In 2020, Tinmouth announced that she would be racing on a Phil Crowe Performance BMW S1000RR in the National Superstock Championship with the support of the Ashcourt Group and she'll be changing race number to 25.

On May 17, 2026, Tinmouth announced via Facebook that she had broken her leg in an off-road bike crash. Her injury was the ultimate deciding factor of her later decision to sit out of the 2026 Isle of Man TT, and Tinmouth described herself as feeling "gutted to let everyone down'".

== Career statistics ==
Stats correct as of 9 July 2012

=== British Supersport Championship ===
(key) (Races in bold indicate pole position, races in italics indicate fastest lap)

Year	Bike	1	2	3	4	5	6	7	8	9	10	11	12	Pos	Pts
2009	Honda	BHI; 25	OUL; Ret	DON; 22	THR	SNE; 21	KNO; 23	MAL; 19	BHGP; 17	CAD; 24	CRO; 20	SIL; 18	OUL; Ret	NC	0
2010	Honda	BHI; 24	THR; 18	OUL; 9	CAD; 20	MAL; 17	KNO; 19	SNE; 18	BHGP; Ret	CAD; 18	CRO; 15	SIL; 16	OUL; 20	25th	8

Year	Bike	1		2		3		4		5		6		7		8		9		10		11		12			Pos	Pts
Year	Bike	R1	R2	R1	R2	R1	R2	R1	R2	R1	R2	R1	R2	R1	R2	R1	R2	R1	R2	R1	R2	R1	R2	R1	R2	R3	Pos	Pts
2011	Honda	BRH	BRH	OUL	OUL	CRO	CRO	THR	THR	KNO; 23	KNO; 20	SNE; 27	SNE; 18	OUL; Ret	OUL; C	BRH; 29	BRH; 15	CAD; 25	CAD; Ret	DON; 13	DON; 11	SIL; 15	SIL; 12	BRH; Ret	BRH; 12	BRH; Ret	**26th**	**18**

=== British Superbike Championship ===
Year	Bike	1		2		3			4		5		6			7		8		9		10		11		12			Pos	Pts	Ref
Year	Bike	R1	R2	R1	R2	R1	R2	R3	R1	R2	R1	R2	R1	R2	R3	R1	R2	R1	R2	R1	R2	R1	R2	R1	R2	R1	R2	R3	Pos	Pts	Ref
2011	Aprilia	BHI; WD	BHI; WD	OUL; DNQ	OUL; DNQ	CRO; Ret	CRO; Ret		THR	THR	KNO	KNO	SNE	SNE		OUL	OUL	BHGP	BHGP	CAD	CAD	DON	DON	SIL	SIL	BHGP	BHGP		NC	0	
2012	Honda	BHI; DNS	BHI; C	THR; 26	THR; 27	OUL; 24	OUL; DNS	OUL; DNS	SNE; 19	SNE; 19	KNO; 20	KNO; 20	OUL; 20	OUL; 21	OUL; Ret	BHGP	BHGP	CAD	CAD	DON	DON	ASS	ASS	SIL	SIL	BHGP	BHGP	BHGP	NC*	0*	

Year	Make	1			2			3			4			5			6			7			8			9			10			11			12			Pos	Pts
Year	Make	R1	R2	R3	R1	R2	R3	R1	R2	R3	R1	R2	R3	R1	R2	R3	R1	R2	R3	R1	R2	R3	R1	R2	R3	R1	R2	R3	R1	R2	R3	R1	R2	R3	R1	R2	R3	Pos	Pts
2013	Honda	BHI; DNS	BHI; DNS		THR; 19	THR; 18		OUL; 19	OUL; Ret		KNO; 18	KNO; Ret		SNE; Ret	SNE; 15		BHGP; 18	BHGP; 17		OUL; 21	OUL; 19	OUL; 20	CAD; DNS	CAD; DNS		DON; Ret	DON; Ret		ASS; 19	ASS; Ret		SIL; 20	SIL; 21		BHGP; Ret	BHGP; Ret	BHGP; 19	31st	1
2014	Honda	BHI; 27	BHI; 23		OUL; 20	OUL; 20		SNE; 17	SNE; 17		KNO; 19	KNO; 18		BHGP; 22	BHGP; DNS		THR; 23	THR; 19		OUL; 20	OUL; 22	OUL; Ret	CAD	CAD		DON	DON		ASS	ASS		SIL; 18	SIL; 20		BHGP; 19	BHGP; 19	BHGP; 22	NC	0

Year	Make	1		2		3			4		5		6			7		8			9			10		11		12			Pos	Pts
Year	Make	R1	R2	R1	R2	R1	R2	R3	R1	R2	R1	R2	R1	R2	R3	R1	R2	R1	R2	R3	R1	R2	R3	R1	R2	R1	R2	R1	R2	R3	Pos	Pts
2015	Honda	DON; Ret	DON; DNS	BHI; 23	BHI; 30	OUL; 25	OUL; 26		SNE; 22	SNE; Ret	KNO; 18	KNO; 22	BHGP; 19	BHGP; 22		THR; Ret	THR; 22	CAD; 22	CAD; 20		OUL; 20	OUL; 22	OUL; 25	ASS; 21	ASS; Ret	SIL; 23	SIL; 25	BHGP; 23	BHGP; 20	BHGP; 19	NC	0
2016	Honda	SIL; 20	SIL; 23	OUL; 22	OUL; 19	BHI; Ret	BHI; Ret		KNO; 24	KNO; 20	SNE; Ret	SNE; Ret	THR; Ret	THR; DNS		BHGP; DNS	BHGP; DNS	CAD; 27	CAD; 24		OUL; 22	OUL; 23	OUL; 24	DON; Ret	DON; 19	ASS; 27	ASS; 26	BHGP; DNS	BHGP; DNS	BHGP; DNS	NC	0

- * Season still in progress
