= Creg Willey's Hill =

Coordinates: 54°13′51″N 4°37′03″W

Creg Willey's Hill, Craig Wyllys, or Creg Willey's (Manx: Creg Willy Syl - Willy Sylvester's Rock) is situated close to the 10th milestone road-side marker after Sarah's Cottage on the Snaefell Mountain Course used for the Isle of Man TT races on the primary A3 Castletown to Ramsey road in the parish of German in the Isle of Man.

Creg Willey's Hillclimb is a motor sport event run by the Manx Motor Racing Club held on a short stretch of the TT course approximately 1.45 miles (2.33 km) in length. The participants run individually in the timed event starting at Glen Helen, then uphill to negotiate Sarah's Cottage, Creg Willey's and Lambfell before finishing on the Cronk-y-Voddy Straight.

Creg Willey's Hill was part of the Highland Course and the Four Inch Course used for the Gordon Bennett Trial and Tourist Trophy car races held between 1904 and 1922. It was also part of the St John's Short Course used between 1907 and 1910, and part of the Snaefell Mountain Course used since 1911 for the TT races and 1923 for the Manx Grand Prix.
