= Enertia =

Enertia may refer to:

- Brammo Enertia
- Brammo Enertia GT
