= Mark Miller (TT motorcyclist) =

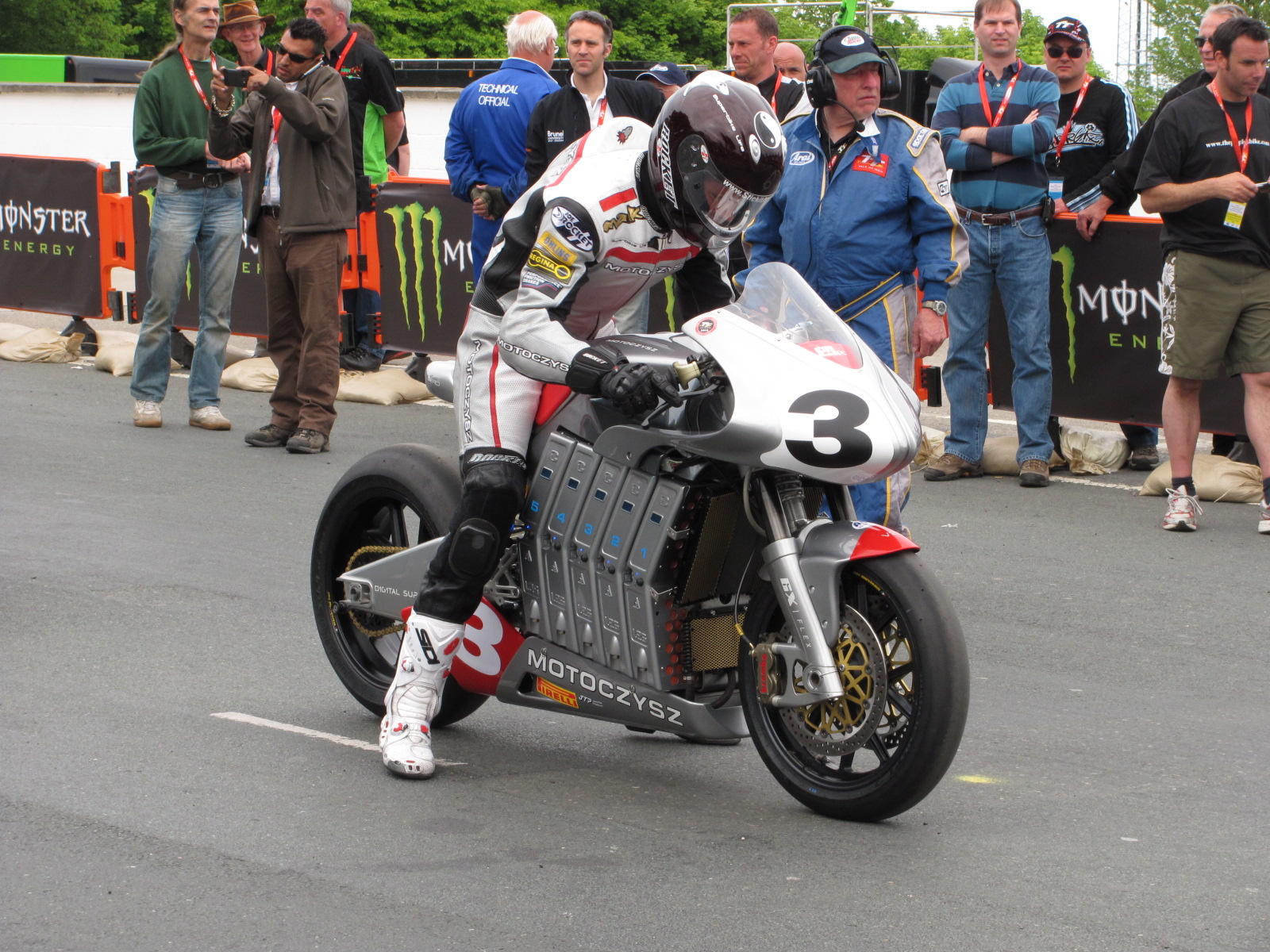
- Mark Miller starting 2010 TT Zero Practice Session on MotoCzysz E1pc
- Nationality: American
Motorcycle racing career statistics
Isle of Man TT career
TTs contested	12 (2006–2015)
TT wins	1
First TT win	2010 Zero TT
Last TT win	2010 Zero TT
TT podiums	3. 2011 – 2nd place, 2012 3rd place

Mark Miller is an American former motorcycle racer in AMA superbike series, an Isle of Man TT winner and Macau Grand Prix competitor.

In 2010, Miller won the TT Zero race which replaced the 2009 format called TTXGP in which he failed to finish the course. In both events, Miller rode MotoCzysz machines, winning on an updated bike designated MotoCzysz E1pc. His victory at the Isle of Man is featured in the film Charge, Zero Emissions/Maximum Speed by Mark Neale.

Miller finished second in the 2011 race and third in 2012, again on MotoCzysz machines. The better-placed finishers were highly experienced TT racers John McGuinness and Michael Rutter who normally competed aboard top-flight conventional petrol (US-gas) engined machines in both TT and short-circuit racing at professional level.

In the 2013 race, Miller suffered mechanical failure of his MotoCzysz just after Ballaugh, close to one-half distance around the 37.733-mile one-lap road circuit, whilst his teammate Michael Rutter won at record speed.

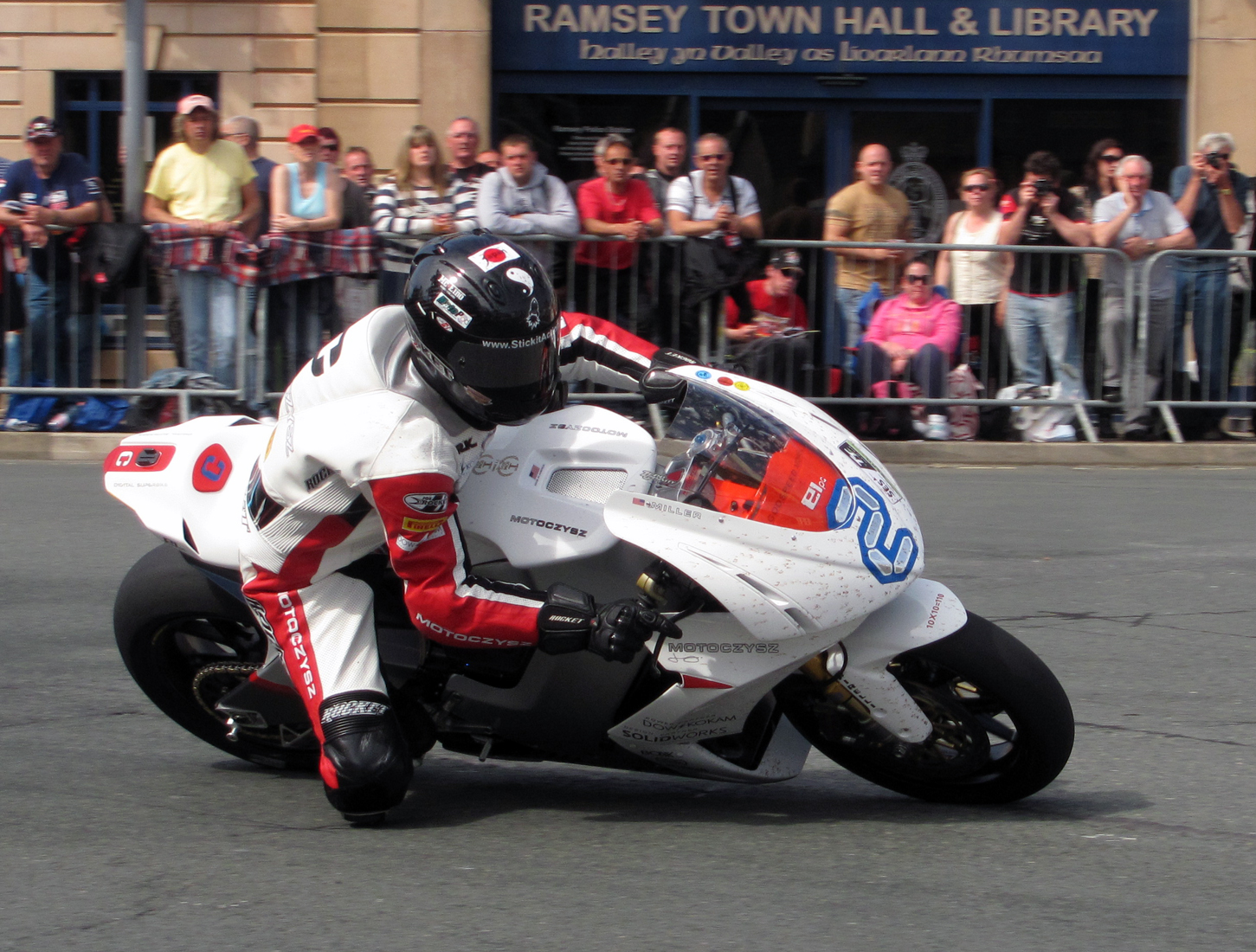
Mark Miller, MotoCzysz E1pc – Practice Session, Parliament Square, Ramsey 3 June 2013.

== Career statistics ==
=== AMA Superstock Championship ===
==== By year ====
Year	Class	Bike	1	2	3	4	5	6	7	8	9	10	Pos	Pts
2005	Superstock	Suzuki	DAY	BAR	FON	INF; 19	PPK	RAM	LAG; 15	M-O	VIR	RAT; 18	27th	41

=== British Superbike Championship ===
==== By year ====
(key) (Races in bold indicate pole position; races in italics indicate fastest lap)

Year	Make	1			2			3			4			5			6			7			8			9			10			11			12			Pos	Pts
Year	Make	R1	R2	R3	R1	R2	R3	R1	R2	R3	R1	R2	R3	R1	R2	R3	R1	R2	R3	R1	R2	R3	R1	R2	R3	R1	R2	R3	R1	R2	R3	R1	R2	R3	R1	R2	R3	Pos	Pts
2011	Aprilia	BHI	BHI		OUL	OUL		CRO	CRO		THR	THR		KNO; Ret	KNO; 24		SNE; 26	SNE; 20		OUL	OUL; C		BHGP	BHGP	BHGP	CAD	CAD	CAD	DON	DON		SIL	SIL		BHGP	BHGP	BHGP	44th	0
