= Michael Czysz =

American motorcycle road racing rider

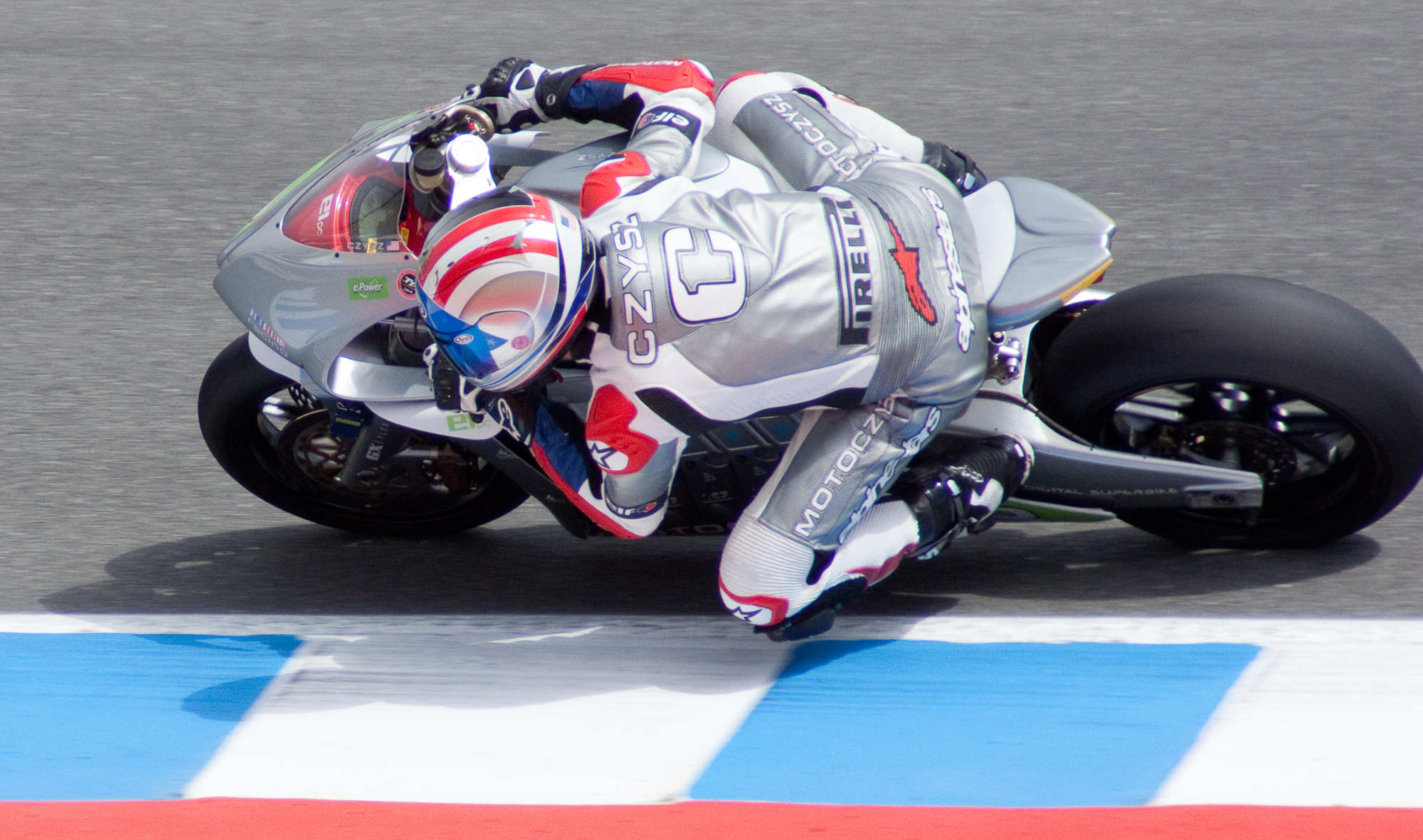
- Michael Czysz riding the MotoCzysz E1pc, on his way to victory in the Laguna Seca e-Power race, 25 July 2010
- Nationality: American
- Died: 7 May 2016; Portland, Oregon

Michael Czysz (1964 – 7 May 2016) was an American motorcycle road racing rider, engineer, motorcycle designer/developer, and entrepreneur.

Czysz attended Portland State University, and transferred to the Parsons School of Design at The New School in New York, but dropped out. He went on to start his own design firm, Architropolis, where he designed homes for celebrities including Lenny Kravitz, a onetime friend and neighbor, and Cindy Crawford. He also designed high-end hotels, including the W Hotel in Miami, and Las Vegas casinos.

Czysz later left his design career, to design a high-performance racing motorcycle and formed MotoCzysz. He wanted to build a world-class, American race bike. The result was the radical MotoCzysz C1, a complete ground-up design, powered by a gasoline engine of his own design, built to take on the world. Unfortunately, constant rule changes in MotoGP rendered it ineligible for racing, and the project was eventually scrapped. He then turned his attention to electric motorcycles. He created the MotoCzysz E1pc, which made history at the Isle of Man TT, winning the inaugural TT Zero electric motorcycle race in 2010, as well as the next three after that.

In 2013, Czysz was diagnosed with anaplastic rhabdomyosarcoma (also known as pleomorphic rhabdomyosarcoma), a rare form of cancer. He died on 7 May 2016.
