= Rob Barber =

Motorcycle racer

Rob Barber (born 1983) is an English professional motorcycle racer, and has also been described as an "IT consultant."

Barber won the only running of the TTXGP in 2009, the forerunner to the TT Zero.

In the TT Zero, Barber has multiple podium finishes, including a second place in 2010 Isle of Man TT and third at the 2013 Isle of Man TT and 2014 Isle of Man TT.

Together with his father Phil, Barber runs the PRB Racing team.

On 21 November 2019, on an episode of the BBC Television programme Question Time, during the run-up to the 2019 United Kingdom general election, accompanied by his mother, Barber claimed that, although his annual income was over £80,000, this placed him in the lower 50% of United Kingdom earners; he repeatedly and aggressively called the Labour parliamentary candidate Richard Burgon "a liar" for stating otherwise. Jolyon Maugham, a barrister specialising in tax law, has confirmed that an income of £80,000+ per year would in fact place Barber in the top three per cent of UK earners.
