= TTXGP =

Electric motorsport race series

TTXGP Logo

TTXGP are the official promoters of FIM eRoadRacing, an electric motorsport race series. Founded by Azhar Hussain MBE & Hersh Patel in 2008, TTXGP started life as the first zero-carbon, clean-emission race to take place at the Isle of Man TT as teams from around the globe raced electric motorbikes.

TTXGP then grew to become a world championship before the company took up the official role as promoters of FIM eRoad Racing when TTXGP and FIM e-Power joined forces in 2013.

== Origin ==
The TTXGP was a new event for the 2009 Isle of Man TT races, promoted by Azhar Hussain & Hersh Patel, who took the idea forward after a number of different Manx individuals mooted the initial idea. Engineer Peter Hindley and civil servant Brian Hammond had proposed the idea of a zero-carbon TT motorcycle race on the Isle of Man to the IOM government in 2008. Hindley's proposed format, which was largely adopted, was based on that of the original 1907 TT race which valued fuel economy as well as speed.

The 2009 TTXGP was a one-lap, 37.733-mile (60.725 km) race for racing motorcycles "powered without the use of carbon based fuels and have zero toxic/noxious emissions." For 2010 the event was replaced by TT Zero, also created for zero-emissions motorcycles. In 2010, Hussain organized electric motorcycle races in North America and Europe that culminated in a world championship race in Albacete Spain. The series expanded to include Australia in 2011 along with races in the United States and Europe.

== 2009 ==
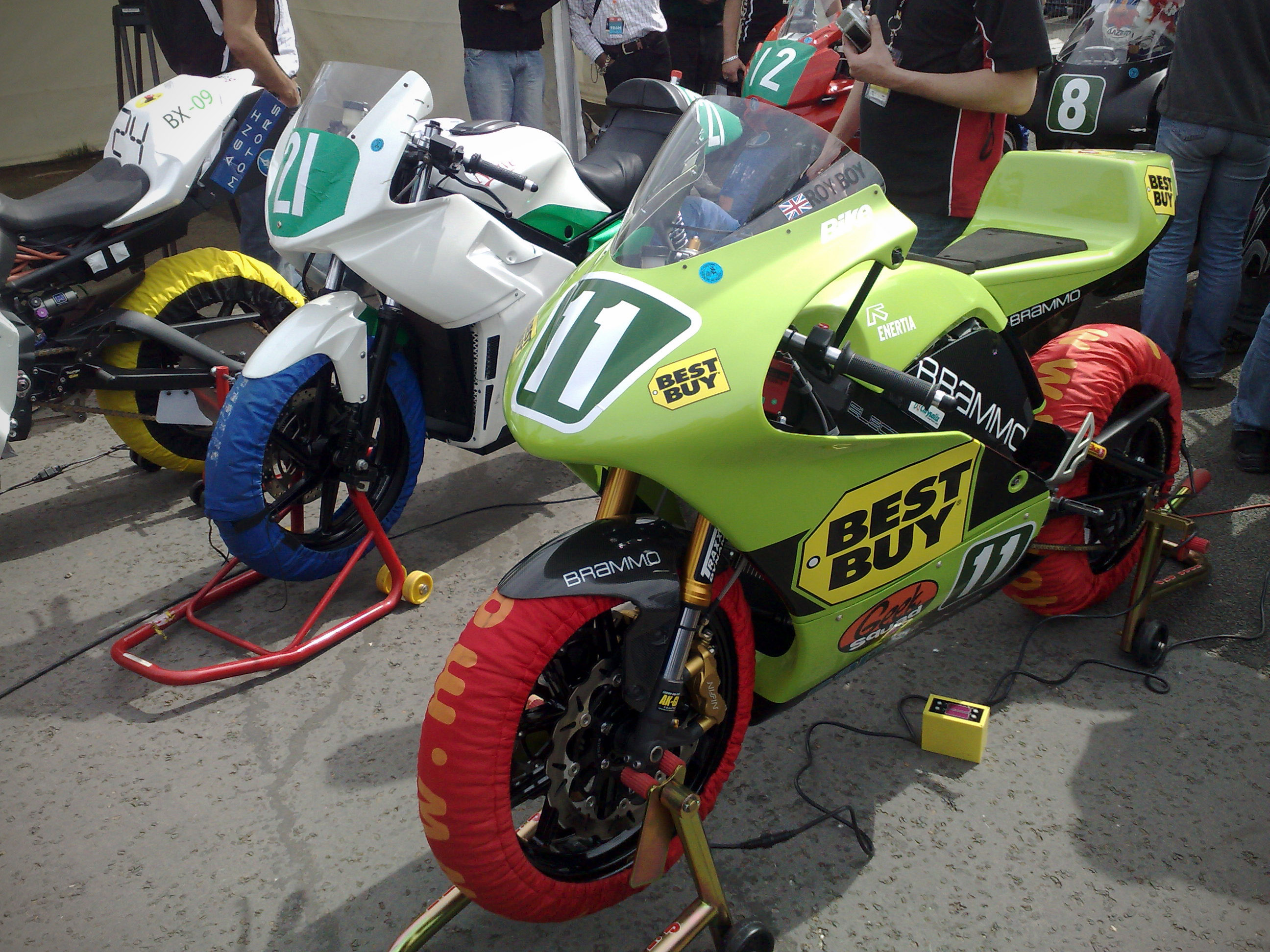
TTXGP bikes in the paddock before their first practice session in the 2009 Isle of Man TT

=== Machines ===
For 2009 the classes were established to cover different types of energy systems. This was changed for the 2010 season to focus exclusively on electric.

Professional Class (officially denominated as "Best Buy Pro Class")

- 3a Prototype electrically propelled motorcycles. Powered solely by stored electricity (battery/accumulator)
- 3b Fuel cell Class – Powered by a fuel cell device and stored electricity (battery/accumulator) if required.
- 3c Conventional internal combustion engine powered machines fuelled by non-carbon-based fuel. (i.e. hydrogen). These machines must comply with all ACU regulations for racing motorcycles, including 105 dBA noise restriction.
- 3d Hybrid propulsion systems.

Open Class

- Electrically propelled machines, powered solely by stored electricity (battery/accumulator).

Weight

- Motorcycles' minimum weight is 100 kg (220 lb) and up to 300 kg (660 lb). Weighed in race-ready mode.

=== Official qualification time ===
- 50 minutes an average speed of 45.16 mph (72.68 km/h) for 1 lap of the Mountain Course without stopping.

=== TTXGP participants - 2009 Isle of Man TT Races ===
Team	Class	Motorcycle	No	Rider
Mission Motors	PRO	3a	1	(United States) Thomas Montano
Kingston University	Open		3	(Scotland) George Spence
EVOdesign	PRO	3a	4	(Wales) Paul Owen
MotoCzysz	PRO	3a	5	(United States) Mark Miller
KillaCycle Racing /Lightning Motorcycles	PRO	3a	6	(Republic of Ireland) Alan Connor
eROCKIT	PRO	3a	7	(Isle of Man) David Madsen-Mygdal
Barefoot Motors Racing	PRO	3a	8	(England) Chris Petty
Imperial TTxGP	PRO	3a	10	(England) Chris Palmer
Brammo/BIKE	PRO	3a	11	(England) Roy Richardson
Team Agni	PRO	3a	12	(England) Robert Barber
HTBLAUVA - TGM	PRO	3a	14	(New Zealand) Paul Dobbs
ManTTx Racing	Open		16	(Isle of Man) Dan Kneen
TORK	PRO	3a	17	(Isle of Man) John Crellin
XXL	PRO	3a	18	(Germany) Thomas Schoenfelder
EVOdesign	PRO	3a	19	(England) Olie Linsdell
ElectricMotorsport.com / Native Cycles	Open		21	(England) Chris Heath
ElectricMotorsport.com / Native Cycles	PRO	3a	22	(Republic of Ireland) Roger Maher
Peace e-rider	Open		23	(Spain) Antonio Maseo
Brunel X-team	PRO	3a	24	(England) Steve Harper
Brammo/BIKE	PRO	3a	26	(Scotland) Mark Buckley

=== 2009 TTXGP Best Buy PRO Class final standings. ===
12 June 2009 1 Lap (37.733 mi (60.725 km)) Mountain Course. TTXGP for Carbon free emission motor-cycles in PRO classes 3a-3d

Rank	Rider	Team	Speed	Time
1	(England) Rob Barber	AGNI	87.434 mph (140.711 km/h)	25' 53.50
2	(Germany) Thomas Schoenfelder	XXL	77.841 mph (125.273 km/h)	29' 04.93
3	(Scotland) Mark Buckley	Brammo	75.350 mph (121.264 km/h)	30' 02.64
4	(United States) Thomas Montano	Mission Motors	74.091 mph (119.238 km/h)	30' 33.26
5	(New Zealand) Paul Dobbs	HTBLAuVA - TGM	62.575 mph (100.705 km/h)	36' 10.63
6	(England) Stephen Harper	Brunel X-team	40.092 mph (64.522 km/h)	56' 27.89

=== 2009 TTXGP OPEN Class final standings. ===
12 June 2009 1 Lap (37.733 mi (60.725 km)) Mountain Course. TTXGP for Carbon free emission motor-cycles in OPEN class.

Rank	Rider	Team	Speed	Time
1	(England) Chris Heath	ElectricMotorsport.com / Native Cycles	66.022 mph (106.252 km/h)	34' 17.30
2	(England) Chris Petty	Barefoot Motors	62.219 mph (100.132 km/h)	36' 23.06
3	(Isle of Man) John Crellin	TORK	60.475 mph (97.325 km/h)	37' 26.01

=== Conflict with FIM ===
Shortly after the inaugural TTXGP race on the Isle of Man in June 2009, discussions commenced between Fédération Internationale de Motocyclisme (FIM), the international governing body of motorcycle racing, and TTXGP regarding the FIM sanction of an eGrandPrix world championship. The TTXGP Technical Rules, which dealt with class specifications, safety of riders and marshals, and, generally, guidelines concerning the mitigation of possible hazards presented by the electric systems of the motorcycles; were shared with FIM during these discussions. In November 2009, talks broke down and, thereafter, FIM organized its own electric motorcycle racing series, denominated the e-Power. Motorcycling's publication of record in the UK indicated that "the split arose after the FIM reneged on its original agreement with TTXGP series organisers, threatening to withdraw its backing pending payment of half a million Euros. A witness to the proceedings claims the FIM then demanded full rights to the series. When the demand was refused the FIM then insisted the rule book – drafted by TTXGP organisers – could not be used outside the FIM’s own hastily-organised series." Another publication indicated "The FIM knew a good thing when it saw it and started working with Hussain to push electric motorcycle racing onto a much bigger stage. Things were looking rosy until the FIM walked away — and took the TTXGP’s rule book with it — in November and announced the E-Power series, four races slated to begin in May." By January 2010, TTXGP had announced a 2010 series of races that would commence in May at Infineon Raceway, Sonoma, California, and would include races in Canada, Italy, UK and Spain.

=== Conflict with IOM ===
TTXGP had planned to return in June 2010 to the Isle of Man to hold the second annual electric motorcycle race on the Island. In January 2010, however, the Isle of Man Department of Tourism and Leisure announced that it would be holding its own electric motorcycle race, the TT Zero, without involvement by TTXGP.

== 2010 ==
=== TTXGP Technical Rules Wiki ===
In January 2010, TTXGP announced that it was going to utilize a wiki-based rules model. Hussain said, "We have created a rules wiki at www.egrandprix.com/wiki. You can take the 2010 rules posted there and let us know how you think they should be amended via the wiki systems. . . Our strength is our recognition that inclusion and diversity are among the core elements of success in our new endeavour." At the time, Motorcycle News called it, "another inspired move by Hussain which helps keep his series closer to the pulse of modern race fans and participants, while leaving rival FIM look lead-footed."

=== TTXGP UK 2010 participants ===
Team	Motorcycle	No	Rider
Morris Motorcycles Racing Team 2010	Mavizen	61	(Sweden) Annie Seel
Kingston University	PWI	62	(England) Adam Palfreman
ManTTx Racing	ManTTx	63	(Isle of Man) James McBride
MRB Racing/ The Tuning Works	Suzuki	64	(England) Russell Licence
TORK INDIA	T002X	65	(England) Jim Lovell
Kingston University/LiFeBATT/LiFeTech Racing	Cagiva	66	(England) Harry Hardi
Imperial TTXGP	Suzuki/Lemco	67	(England) Daniel Jackson
Electric Hussars	Mavizen	68	(England) Pete Ward
Team Agni	Suzuki/Agni	69	(England) Rob Moon
Team Agni	Suzuki/Agni	77	(England) Jenny Tinmouth

== 2011 ==
According to a joint press release by FIM and TTXGP, the two organizations combined forces for the first time in July 2011. "In a spirit of collaboration and with the common goal of promoting electric clean emission racing, the FIM e-Power & TTXGP Championships will combine both series in a support race during the FIM MotoGP World Championship Round to be held this weekend at the Mazda Raceway Laguna Seca, California (USA)." Both championships were won in 2011 by German Münch Racing Team as constructor and Matthias Himmelmann as rider on a Münch TTE-2.

=== Race Results - Mazda Raceway Laguna Seca ===
Pos	Rider	Nation	Team	Class	Total Time	Km/h	Gap
1	Steve Rapp	(United States)	Mission Motors	TTXGP	12'40.597	136.692	
2	Michael Czysz	(United States)	MotoCzysz	e-Power	13'20.592	129.863	0'39.995
3	Michael Barnes	(United States)	Lightning	TTXGP	13'20.825	129.826	0'40.228
4	Steve Atlas	(United States)	Brammo	TTXGP	13'40.456	126.719	0'59.859
5	Alessandro Brannetti	(Italy)	CRP	TTXGP/e-Power	13'40.814	126.664	1'00.217
6	Matthias Himmelmann	(Germany)	Münch	TTXGP/e-Power	13'41.076	126.624	1'00.479
7	Thad Wolff	(United States)	Moto Electra	TTXGP	12'51.894	117.855	1 lap
8	Shelina Moreda	(United States)	CRP	TTXGP/e-Power	13'16.681	114.118	1 lap
9	Ely Schless	(United States)	Proto Moto	TTX75	14'17.093	106.14	1 lap
10	Marcelino Manzano	(Spain)	LGN	e-Power	14'25.614	105.095	1 lap
11	Kenyon Kluge	(United States)	Zero	TTX75	DNF		

== 2012 ==
In 2012 both the FIM e-Power and the TTXGP the e-Grand Prix world titles were again won by the German Münch Racing Team as constructor with their Münch TTE-2. Its rider Matthias Himmelmann gained the FIM e-Power world title. With the TTXGP the e-Grand Prix he gained world vice championship and the European title.

== 2013 ==
Following further, successful collaborations between FIM and TTXGP during the 2012 season, particularly at Laguna Seca, the two organisations announced in April 2013 they would be joining forces to create the FIM eRoad Racing World Cup.

The World Cup was announced as a one-off, season-long competition which would allow teams in Europe and the US to compete on their continents for a place in the world final. From 2014, the World Cup format would change to a World Championship meaning teams from both Europe and the US would compete at each round across three continents.

The first FIM eRoad Racing season was announced with races at Laguna Seca, Indianapolis Motor Speedway, Circuit de Valencia, Le Mans, Oschersleben and Miller Motorsports Park with a world final expected to take place during the latter months of 2013, but no World Final was held after having issues to find a suitable venue.

== See also ==
- MotoE World Championship
- Auto-Cycle Union
- Union Européenne de Motocyclisme
- Kit bike
