= MotoCzysz =

Defunct American motorcycle company

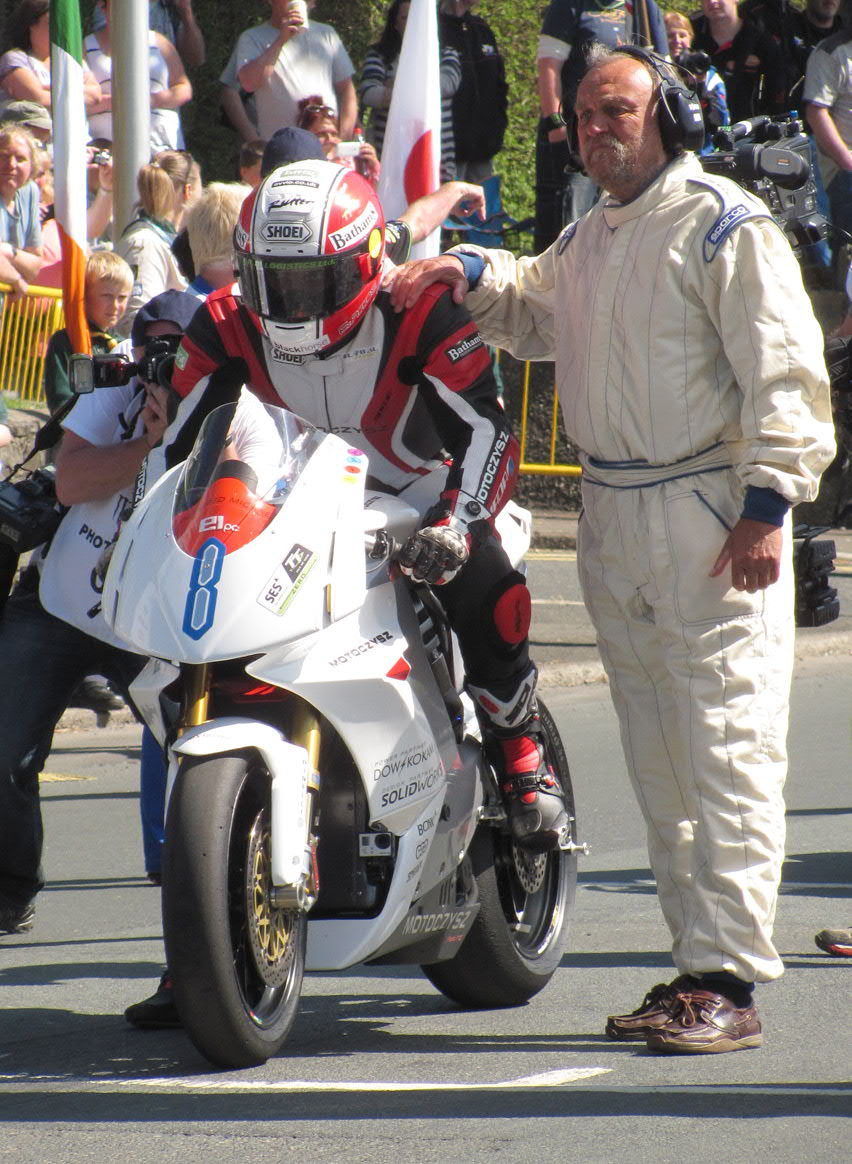
- Michael Rutter about to start the one-lap TT Zero race at the 2013 Isle of Man TT races on the MotoCzysz E1pc
- Company type: Private
- Industry: Motorcycles
- Founded: 2003
- Founder: Michael Czysz
- Fate: Ceased operations
- Headquarters: Portland, Oregon, United States
- Area served: Worldwide
- Key people: Michael Czysz (Founder)
- Products: Motorcycles, electric motorcycles, electric drive systems

MotoCzysz (pronounced MOH-toh-chish) was an American motorcycle company based in Portland, Oregon that intended to compete in MotoGP. The C1 prototype engine was designed with perfect balance not needing a balance shaft. Some of the patented innovations included a slipper clutch with twin clutches, and a unique front suspension. The business also developed a successful electric racing motorcycle, the E1pc.

== History ==
MotoCzysz was founded by late American engineer and professional motorcycle racer Michael Czysz. In June 2009, MotoCzysz raced in the world's first zero-emissions motorcycle grand prix. The race took place on the Isle of Man TT course. This race was the subject of the 2011 documentary Charge where the MotoCzysz team were referred to as the "swaggering American hotshots". In October 2009, MotoCzysz and Bajaj Auto announced a joint venture to create a green automobile. Analysts speculated that the vehicle could be a hybrid vehicle. MotoCzysz teamed with Remy Electric Motors LLC to develop an electric drive system for four-wheeled vehicles. The company then signed a deal with TAC Motors of Brazlia in 2012 to supply those drives for TAC Motors' Stark SUV.

== C1 ==
=== Frame ===
The C1 features a carbon fiber frame that exhibits more stiffness than most other motorcycles. The frame also serves as the bike's airbox.

=== Engine ===
The 990 cc four-cylinder engine is mounted to the frame longitudinally, rather than transversely as on most similarly configured motorcycles. A transverse arrangement fights a bike's gyroscopic tendency to stand up when leaned over and applying throttle. The C1, in order to negate the resulting gyroscopic forces of the longitudinal orientation, has its lengthwise-mounted inline 4 engine cut in half, with the resulting crankshaft halves counter-rotating. Thus, the bike handles with no noticeable gyroscopic force from the engine.

Two of the bike's four throttle bodies are controlled mechanically, while the other two are controlled electronically by the ECU, hypothetically smoothing power delivery. The ECU-controlled throttle bodies can be adjusted by computer for refinement of the throttle curve.

For the 2007 MotoGP season, the Fédération Internationale de Motocyclisme (FIM) and Dorna Sports reduced the engine capacity to 800 cc for the class, rendering the C1's configuration ineligible for competition. Michael Czysz commented in a blog post that they were looking towards racing the bike in either AMA or WSB competition.

=== Production ===
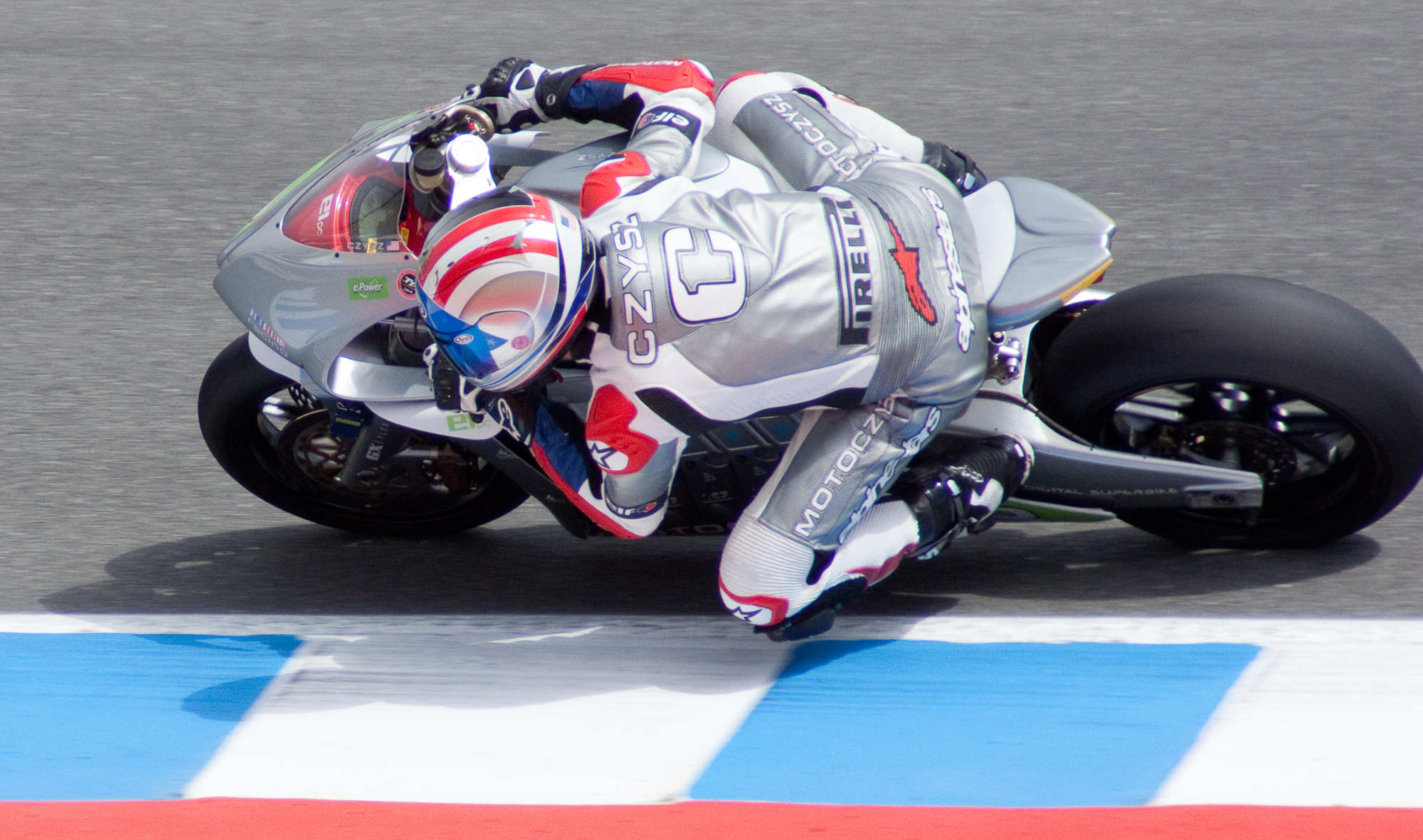
Michael Czysz riding the MotoCzysz E1pc, on his way to victory in the Laguna Seca e-Power race, 25 July 2010

As of mid-2010, MotoCzysz was offering to take down payments towards 50 MotoGP replica bikes offered for $100,000. A production date was unspecified.

=== Awards ===
The C1 was recognized with Robb Report MotorCycling's 2007 Achievement in Design Award.

== E1pc ==
The E1pc all-electric sportsbike was announced in June 2009 as an entrant for the TTXGP but did not finish the race. In 2010, it took first place in the 2010 TT Zero event at the Isle of Man TT, and set a new course record.

For the 2011 TT Zero Race, MotoCzysz riders Michael Rutter and Mark Miller took first and second places and for 2012 the same riders finished first and third.

In the 2013 TT Zero Race, Rutter again won at a new record race-average speed of 109.675 mph, with teammate Miller suffering breakdown.
