= Brammo Enertia =

Brammo Enertia Powercycle
- Manufacturer: Brammo
- Production: 2009-2017
- Class: Standard
- Engine: Permanent magnet AC Synchronous motor
- Top speed: 60 mph (97 km/h)
- Power: 12–25 bhp (12–25 PS; 8.9–18.6 kW) @ 4500 rpm
- Torque: 17–34 ft⋅lbf (23–46 N⋅m)
- Transmission: Single speed direct chain drive
- Suspension: Front: Telescopic 45 mm Marzocchi fork, 5 in (127 mm) travel Rear: Elka Coil Over Shock, 5 in (127 mm) travel
- Brakes: Front and rear Brembo disc
- Tires: Front 100/90-18 Avon RoadRider; Rear 120/80-17 Avon RoadRider
- Rake, trail: 24.0º/3.4 in (86 mm)
- Wheelbase: 56 in (1,422 mm)
- Dimensions: L: 81.5 in (2,070 mm); W: 12.5 in (318 mm) (body), 19.5 in (495 mm) (peg to peg)
- Seat height: 32 in (810 mm)
- Weight: 324 lb (147 kg) (dry); 177 kilograms (390 lb) (wet)
- Fuel capacity: 3.1 kWh
- Range: 40–50 miles (64–80 km)

The Enertia is an electric motorcycle designed and sold by Brammo, Inc. It uses a Lithium iron phosphate battery, and is intended as a commuter vehicle. Enertia motorcycles first went on sale in late July 2009, and began selling at Best Buy in August 2009.

== Construction and components ==
The body uses monocoque construction. Early prototypes used carbon fiber as the principal material, but Brammo later decided to produce the monocoque body out of aluminum. Some of the bike's components are made entirely of recycled material, while the body panels are created from a mixed percentage of recycled and new materials.

The Enertia's permanent magnet AC synchronous motor is powered by six Valence lithium iron phosphate battery modules, which can provide a top speed of over 62 mph (100 km/h). The vehicle's batteries can be recharged via the onboard charger within three hours by plugging into a standard 110 volt electrical outlet.

Brammo has stated the Enertia does not have regenerative braking because of the limited benefit that current regenerative braking technology provides to motorcycles, and the risk of traction problems.

According to Cycle World magazine, "With its wide, mild-rise handlebar, sporty steering geometry and narrow 18-inch-front/17-inch-rear Avon RoadRiders, the Enertia is a light and responsive handler." The road test editor recorded a 0-60 mph time of 16.1 seconds, and a quarter-mile run of 20.19 seconds at 60.78 mph.

The current testing versions of the Enertia being shown to the media are described as enjoyable to ride, nimble and easy to control. It is also capable of better speed than widely promised, up to 65 mph (105 km/h), although this quickly drains the battery.

Most of the cost of the motorcycle is due to the battery. Brammo is hoping for the cost of this component to fall in the future, and is talking of creating a program to lease rather than own the battery.

== Comparison with conventional motorcycles ==
With 12 to 25 hp (8.9–18.6 kW), and 17 to 34 ft⋅lbf (23–46 N⋅m) of torque in the 'performance' mode, the Enertia's power output is comparable to a conventionally powered Kawasaki Ninja 250 motorcycle. However, the 2009 Ninja 250 has a top speed of 95.5 mph (153.7 km/h), while the Enertia's top speed is 50 mph or 55 mph (89 km/h). It has no gears or clutch so shifting is not required, which Brammo claims enables the Enertia to go from 0 to 30 mph (0 to 48 km/h) in 3.8 seconds in performance mode. Tested by Cycle World, the Ninja 250 accelerates from 0 to 30 mph (0 to 48 km/h) in 2.0 seconds. Motorcycle Consumer News projected a range of 246 mi (396 km) for the Ninja 250 based on their tested 51.2 mpg_{‑US} (4.59 L/100 km; 61.5 mpg_{‑imp}). Brammo claims the Enertia has a range of 40 to 50 miles (64–80 km) between charges if power is set to the minimum level, 40%.

At 19.564 lb (8.874 kg) of carbon dioxide (CO_{2}) per gallon consumed, the Ninja 250 would emit 93.9 lb (42.6 kg) per 4.8 US gal (18 L; 4.0 imp gal) tank, or about 4,967 lb (2,253 kg) of CO_{2} per year if ridden the US average of 13,000 miles (21,000 km) per year. The Enertia would consume 260 charges over the course of 13,000 miles (21,000 km) at 50 miles (80 km) per charge. With a battery pack capacity of 3.1 kW·h, the annual consumption of electricity would be 806 kW·h. With a US national average emissions of 1.297 lb (0.588 kg) CO_{2} per kW·h, the Enertia's yearly carbon emissions would be 1,045 lb (474 kg).
