= TT Zero =

Motorsport event

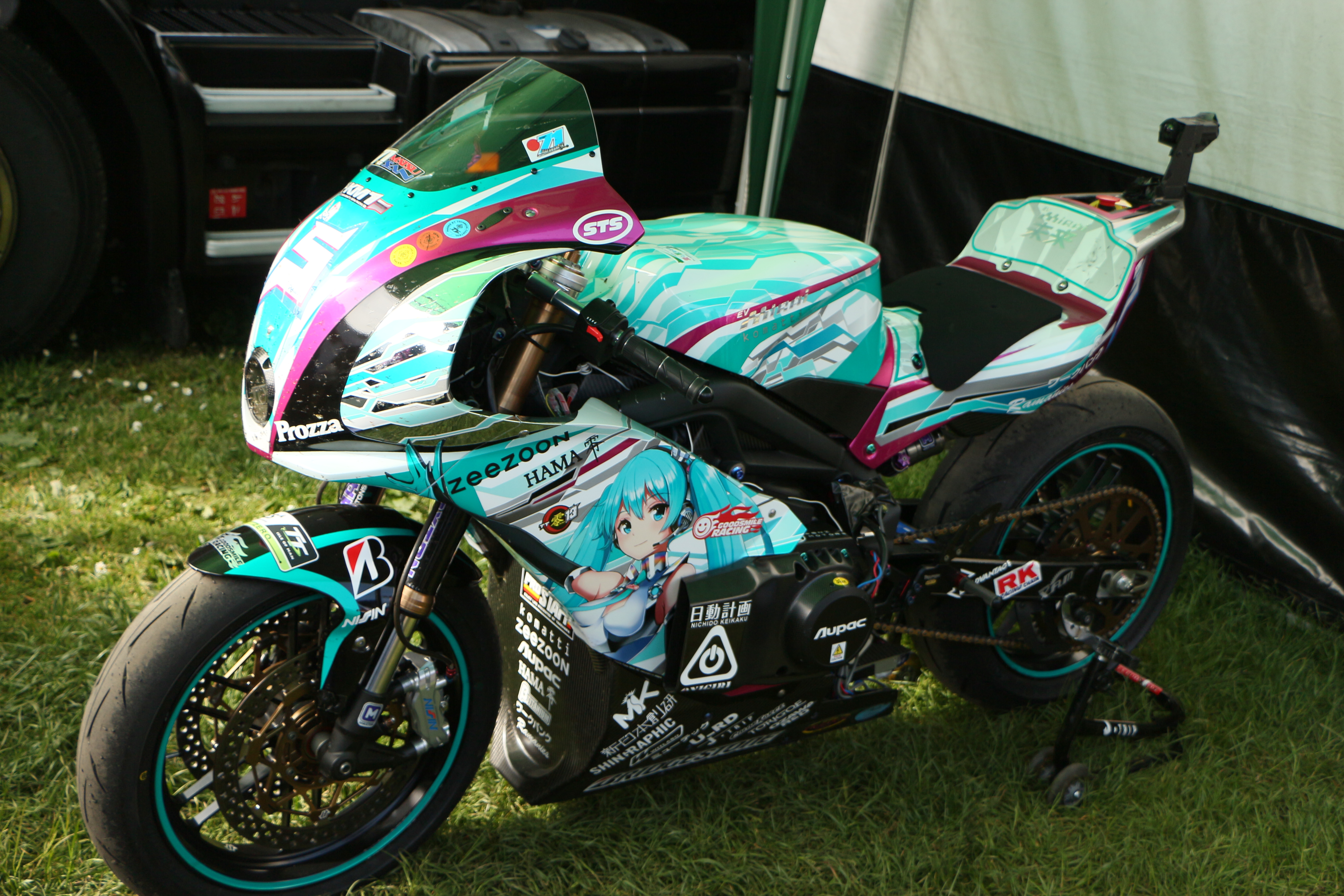
2013 Komatti-Mirai EV with Hatsune Miku livery

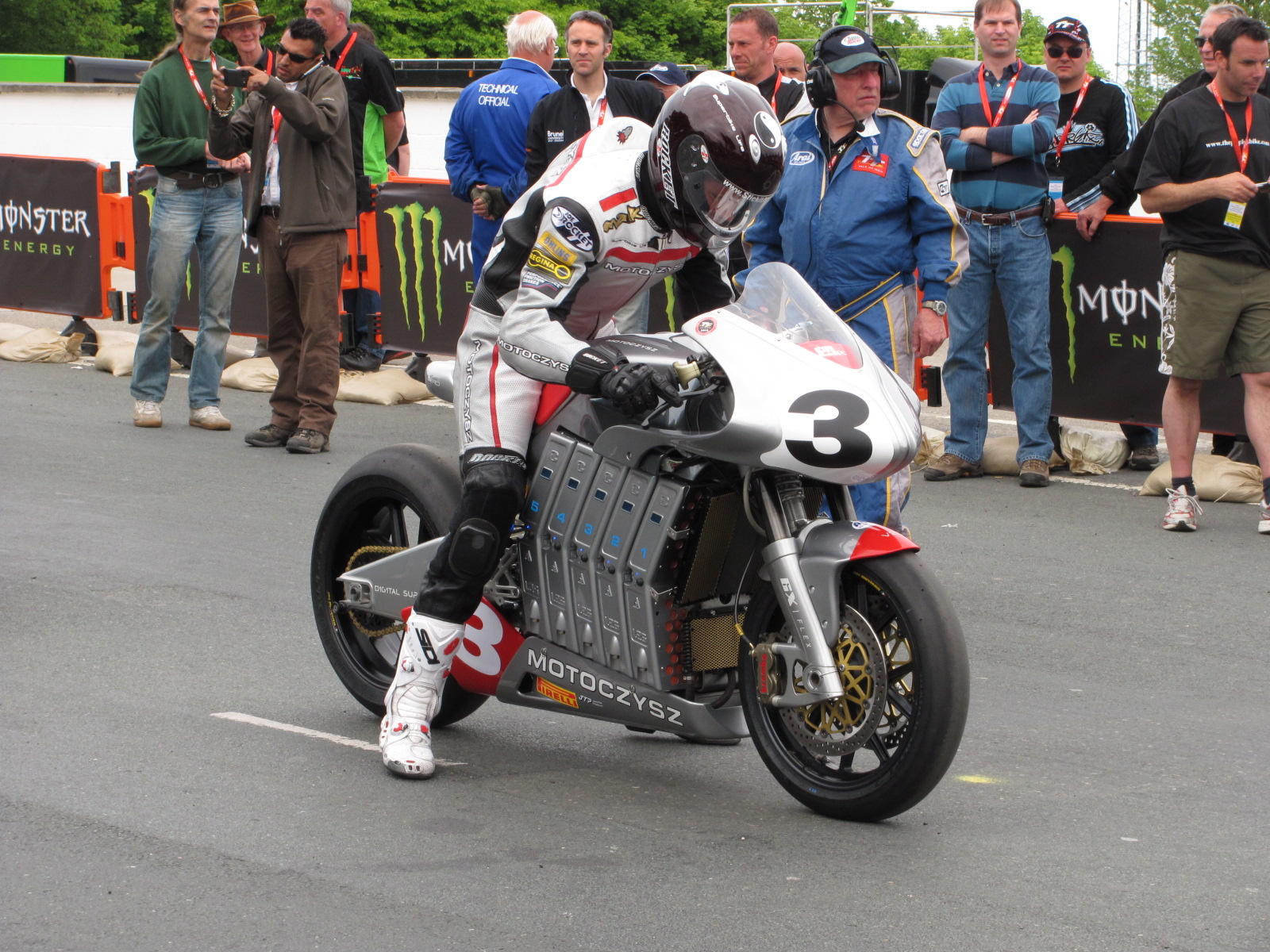
MotoCzysz E1pc, the winning bike of the first TT Zero race in 2010

TT Zero was an electric motorsport event introduced for the 2010 Isle of Man TT races – replaced the similar TTXGP race as a 1-lap (37.733 miles) circuit of the Snaefell Mountain Course. The TT Zero event as an officially sanctioned Isle of Man TT race is for racing motorcycles where "The technical concept is for motorcycles (two wheeled) to be powered without the use of carbon based fuels and have zero toxic/noxious emissions." The Isle of Man Government offered a prize of £10,000 for the first entrant to exceed the prestigious 100 mph (22 minutes and 38.388 seconds) average speed around the Mountain Course.

The inaugural 2010 TT Zero race was won by Mark Miller riding a MotoCzysz E1pc motor-cycle in 23 minutes and 22.89 seconds at an average race speed of 96.820 mph for 1 lap (37.733 miles) of the Mountain Course and the first United States winner since Dave Roper won the 1984 Historic TT riding a 500 cc Matchless G50. The TT Zero race replaced the 2009 TTXGP franchise, won by Rob Barber riding a Team AGNI motor-cycle in 25 minutes and 53.5 seconds at an average race speed of 87.434 mph for 1 lap (37.733 miles), with the simplification of the regulations and the emphasis on electric powered motor-cycles. The MotoCzysz E1pc was also the first American manufactured motor-cycle to win an Isle of Man TT Race since Oliver Godfrey won the 1911 Senior TT with an Indian V-Twin motor-cycle. The 2010 TT Zero race also produced the return of semi-dustbin fairing permissible under the TT Zero regulations and adopted by some entrants, but banned by the FIM since 1958 for racing motor-cycles.

After taking their first victory in 2014 Team Mugen from Japan were the dominant force whilst the event lasted, winning it for 6 consecutive years from 2014 to 2019 and raising the average lap speed to 121.9 mph.

In 2019, a moratorium on further events in this class was announced, due to the slow take-up in electric motorcycles and few race participants. Speaking in late 2021 about the future of the event, Enterprise Minister Alex Allinson has ruled out further competition in this class until at least 2024. To date there have been no further discussions or development in bringing back the event.

== Eligibility ==
=== Entrants ===
- Entrants must be in possession of a valid National Entrants or FIM Sponsors Licence for Road Racing.
- All motor-cycles must comply with Appendix D of the ACU National Sporting Code Group A1 for solos.

=== Machines ===
Description

- Prototype electrically propelled motor-cycles. Powered solely by stored electricity (battery/accumulator)

Weight

- Motor-cycles minimum weight is 100 kg and up to 300 kg. Weighed in race ready mode.

Accumulator (storage battery)

- The accumulator is defined as any equipment used for the intermediate storage of electrical energy supplied by the solar generator or by the charging unit. Any on-board accumulator is considered as an integral part of the vehicle's accumulator. All on-board electrical equipment, unless consisting of items originally powered by dry batteries, small accumulator or their own solar cells, must receive its energy supply from the vehicle's official accumulator.

Voltage

- The voltage is limited to 800 volts between two points.

Kinetic Energy Recovery Systems

- It is permitted to recover energy generated by the kinetic energy of the vehicle using a Regenerative brake or Kinetic Energy Recovery Systems (KERS).

Aerodynamic aids and Streamlining.

- The competitor must be completely visible from either side, except for the riders hands and forearms which may be obscured by bodywork.
- Bodywork in front of the rider must not be higher than the competitor's shoulders.

=== Official Qualification Time ===
- 30.00 minutes at an average race speed of 75.46 mph for 1 lap of the Isle of Man TT Mountain Course without stopping.

== TT Zero Race Results ==
=== 2010 TT Zero Race ===
10 June 2010 1 Lap (37.773 Miles) Mountain Course.

Rank	Rider	Team	Speed	Time
1	(United States) Mark Miller	MotoCzysz E1pc / MotoCzysz	96.820 mph	23' 22.89
2	(England) Rob Barber	Agni Motors / Agni Racing	89.290 mph	25' 21.19
3	(England) James McBride	Man TTX / Man TTX Racing	88.653 mph	25' 32.13
4	(England) Jenny Tinmouth	Agni Motors / Agni Racing	88.228 mph	25' 39.50
5	(Scotland) George Spence	Peter Williams / Kingston University	64.705 mph	34' 59.19

Fastest Lap and New Inaugural Lap Record:Mark Miller – 96.820 mph (23' 22.89) on lap 1.

=== 2011 TT Zero Race ===
9 June 2011 1 Lap (37.73 Miles) Mountain Course.

Rank	Rider	Team	Speed	Time
1	(England) Michael Rutter	MotoCzysz	99.604 mph	22' 43.68
2	(United States) Mark Miller	MotoCzysz	98.288 mph	23' 01.93
3	(Scotland) George Spence	Kingston University	88.435 mph	25' 35.90
4	(Isle of Man) Allan Brew	MIT	79.163 mph	28' 35.81
5	(Japan) Yoshinari Matsushita	Team Prozza	69.877 mph	32' 23.81

Fastest Lap and New Race Record: Michael Rutter – 99.604 mph (22' 43.68) on lap 1.

=== 2012 TT Zero Race ===
6 June 2012 1 Lap (37.73 Miles) Mountain Course.

Rank	Rider	Team	Speed	Time
1	(England) Michael Rutter	MotoCzysz	104.056 mph	21' 45.33
2	(England) John McGuinness	Mugen Shinden	102.215 mph	22' 08.85
3	(United States) Mark Miller	MotoCzysz	101.065 mph	22' 23.97
4	(England) Rob Barber	TGM IOT	78.221 mph	28' 56.45

- (9 Starters)

Fastest Lap and New Race Record: Michael Rutter – 104.056 mph (22' 23.97) on lap 1.

=== 2013 TT Zero Race ===
5 June 2013 1 Lap (37.73 Miles) Mountain Course.

Rank	Rider	Team	Speed	Time
1	(England) Michael Rutter	MotoCzysz	109.675 mph	20' 38.461
2	(England) John McGuinness	Mugen Shinden	109.527 mph	20' 40.133
3	(England) Rob Barber	RW-2 / Ohio State University	90.403 mph	25' 02.467
4	(Scotland) George Spence	Kingston University	88.096 mph	25' 41.822
5	(England) Chris McGahan	Yamaha R6E	83.857 mph	26' 59.755
6	(Wales) Ian Lougher	Komatti-Mirai Racing	81.515 mph	27' 46.300
7	(Isle of Man) David Madsen-Mygdal	Imperial	71.983 mph	31' 26.933
8	(Wales) Paul Owen	Brunel BX/Brunel University	71.738 mph	31' 33.388

- (10 Starters)

Fastest Lap and New Race Record: Michael Rutter – 109.675 mph (20' 38.461) on lap 1.

=== 2014 TT Zero Race ===
4 June 2014 1 Lap (37.73 Miles) Mountain Course.

Rank	Rider	Team	Speed	Time
1	(England) John McGuinness	Shinden San / Team Mugen	117.366 mph	19' 17.300
2	(New Zealand) Bruce Anstey	Shinden San / Team Mugen	115.048 mph	19' 40.625
3	(England) Rob Barber	RW-2x / Ohio State University	93.531 mph	24' 12.230
4	(Scotland) Robert Wilson	Team Sarolea Racing	93.507 mph	24' 12.600
5	(United States) Mark Miller	Vercar Moto	85.828 mph	26' 22.828
6	(France) Timothee Monot	TT Zero	81.515 mph	29' 02.378

- (9 Starters)

Fastest Lap and New Race Record: John McGuinness – 117.366 mph (19' 17.300) on lap 1.

=== 2015 TT Zero Race ===
10 June 2015 1 Lap (37.73 Miles) Mountain Course.

Rank	Rider	Team	Speed	Time
1	(England) John McGuinness	Shinden San / Team Mugen	119.279 mph	18' 58.743
2	(New Zealand) Bruce Anstey	Shinden San / Team Mugen	118.857 mph	19' 02.785
3	(Northern Ireland) Lee Johnston	Victory Racing	111.620 mph	20' 16.881
4	(England) Guy Martin	Victory Racing	109.717 mph	20' 37.987
5	(Scotland) Robert Wislon	Team Sarolea Racing	106.510 mph	21' 15.256
6	(Republic of Ireland) Michael Sweeney	University of Nottingham	73.156 mph	30' 56.695

- (9 Starters)

Fastest Lap and New Race Record: John McGuinness – 119.279 mph (18' 58.743) on lap 1.

=== 2016 TT Zero Race ===
7 June 2016 1 Lap (37.73 Miles) Mountain Course.

Rank	Rider	Team	Speed	Time
1	(New Zealand) Bruce Anstey	Shinden Go / Team Mugen	118.416 mph	19' 07.043
2	(Northern Ireland) William Dunlop	Victory Racing	115.844 mph	19' 32.504
3	(England) Daley Mathison	University of Nottingham	99.884 mph	22' 39.864
4	(England) John McGuinness	Shinden Go / Team Mugen	94.949 mph	23' 50.538
5	(South Africa) Allann Venter	Brunel	94.628 mph	23' 55.383

- (7 Starters)

=== 2017 TT Zero Race ===
9 June 2017 1 Lap (37.73 Miles) Mountain Course.

Rank	Rider	Team	Speed	Time
1	(New Zealand) Bruce Anstey	Shinden Roku / Team Mugen	117.710 mph	19' 13.924
2	(England) Guy Martin	Shinden Roku / Team Mugen	113.632 mph	19' 55.331
3	(England) Daley Mathison	University of Nottingham	109.209 mph	20' 43.748
4	(England) Dean Harrison	Sarolea	108.064 mph	20' 56.924
5	(Spain) Antonio Maeso	University of Nottingham	91.197 mph	24' 49.385
6	(England) James Cowton	Brunel University	90.963 mph	24' 53.229
7	(England) Adam Child	Moto Corsa	78.848 mph	28' 42.662
8	(Wales) Matthew Rees	University of Bath	77.415 mph	29' 14.549

=== 2018 TT Zero Race ===
6 June 2018 1 Lap (37.73 Miles) Mountain Course.

Rank	Rider	Team	Speed	Time
1	(England) Michael Rutter	Mugen Shinden Nana / Team Mugen	121.824 mph	18' 34.956
2	(England) Daley Mathison	University of Nottingham	119.294 mph	18' 58.600
3	(Northern Ireland) Lee Johnston	Mugen Shinden Nana / Team Mugen	105.566 mph	21' 26.668
4	(England) James Cowton	Brunel University	97.372 mph	23' 14.934
5	(England) Adam Child	Moto Corsa	81.332 mph	27' 50.042
6	(England) Shaun Anderson	Brammo / Duffy Motorsport	74.789 mph	30' 16.155

Fastest Lap and New Race Record: Michael Rutter – 121.824 mph (18' 34.956) on lap 1.

=== 2019 TT Zero Race ===
6 June 2019 1 Lap (37.73 Miles) Mountain Course.

Rank	Rider	Team	Speed	Time
1	(England) Michael Rutter	Bathams Mugen	121.91 mph	18' 34.172
2	(England) John McGuinness	Bathams Mugen	120.98 mph	18' 42.738
3	(Wales) Ian Lougher	Team Mirai	102.69 mph	22' 02.697
4	(Wales) Matthew Rees	University of Bath	94.85 mph	23' 52.100
5	(England) Allann Venter	Brunel University	91.48 mph	24' 44.815
6	(England) Mike Norbury	Duffy Motorsport	83.29 mph	27' 10.800
7	(Northern Ireland) Shaun Anderson	Duffy Motorsport	72.03 mph	31' 25.831

Fastest Lap and New Race Record: Michael Rutter – 121.91 mph (18' 34.172) on lap 1.

== Fastest race lap by year ==
(practice & qualifying session laps not included)

Year	Rider(s)	Machine	Lap time	Average speed	
Year	Rider(s)	Machine	Lap time	mph	km/h
2010	(United States) Mark Miller	MotoCzysz E1pc / MotoCzysz	23:22:89	96.820	155.817
2011	(England) Michael Rutter	MotoCzysz	22:43:68	99.604	160.297
2012	(England) Michael Rutter	MotoCzysz	21:45:33	104.056	167.462
2013	(England) Michael Rutter	MotoCzysz	20:38:461	109.675	176.505
2014	(England) John McGuinness	Shinden San / Team Mugen	19:17:300	117.366	188.882
2015	(England) John McGuinness	Shinden Yon / Team Mugen	18:58:743	119.279	191.961
2016	(New Zealand) Bruce Anstey	Shinden Go / Team Mugen	19:07:043	118.416	190.572
2017	(New Zealand) Bruce Anstey	Shinden Roku / Team Mugen	19:13:924	117.710	189.435
2018	(England) Michael Rutter	Shinden Nana / Team Mugen	18:34:956	121.824	196.056
2019	(England) Michael Rutter	Shinden Hachi / Bathams Mugen	18:34:172	121.91	196.195

== Gallery ==
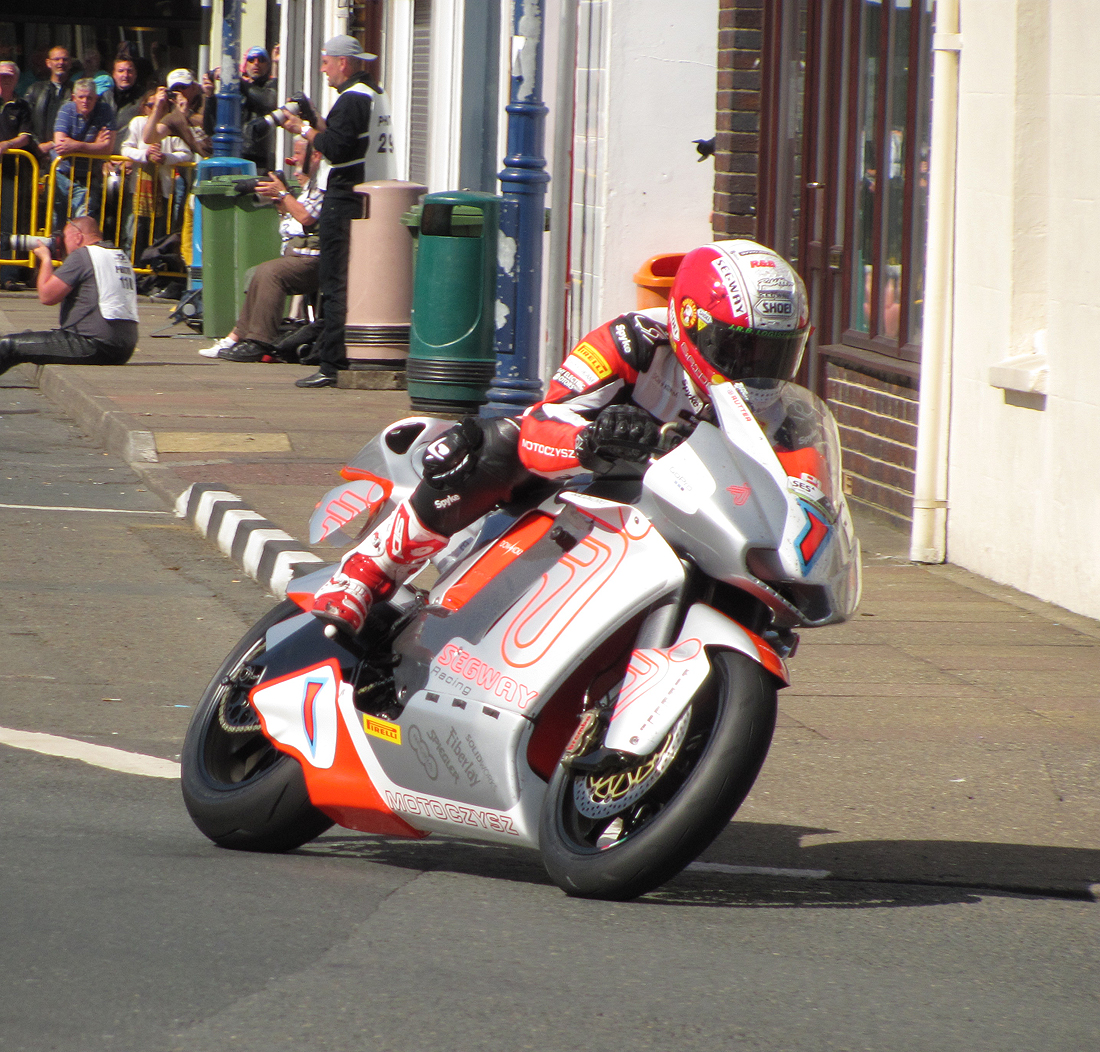
2012 Isle of Man TT TT Zero - Michael Rutter on MotoCzysz during practice for the 2012 TT Zero race.

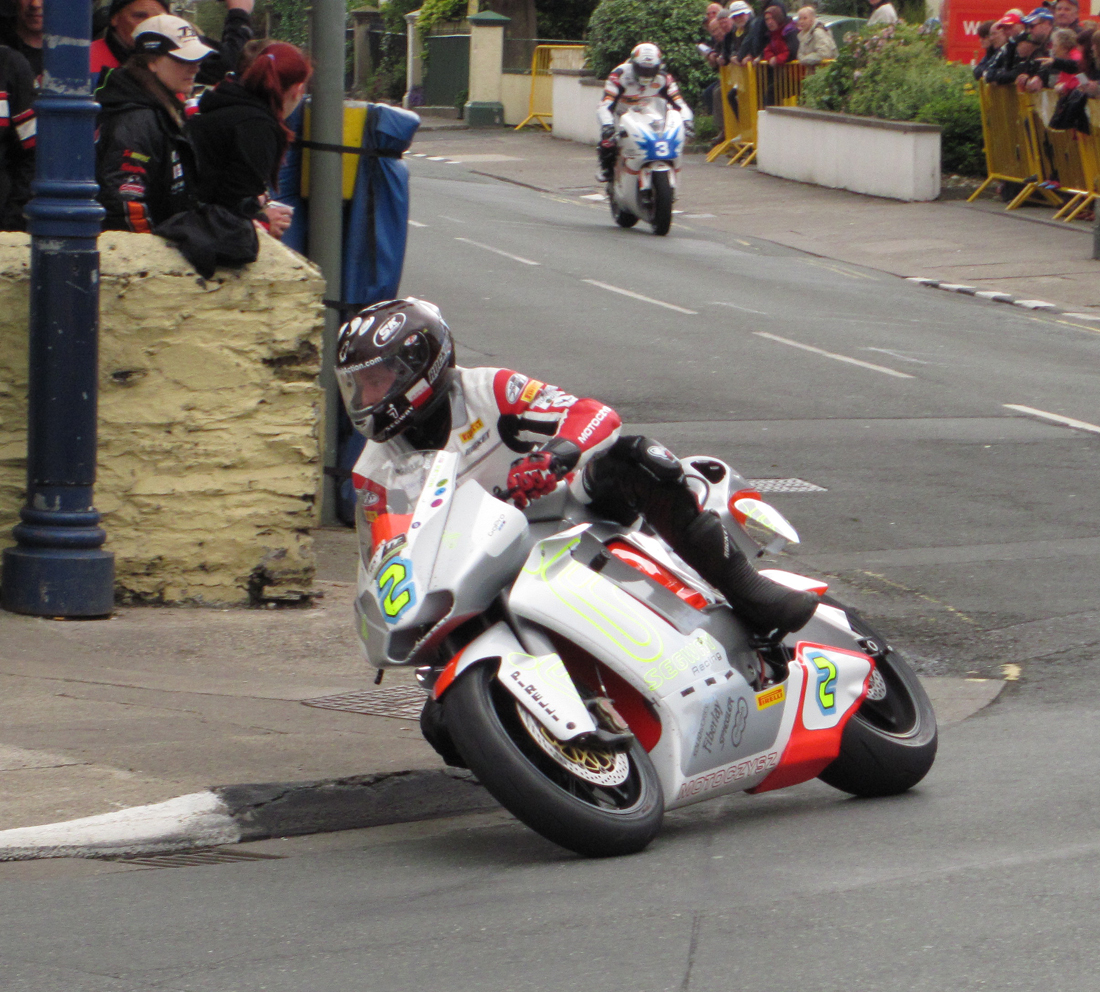
2012 Isle of Man TT TT Zero - (2) Mark Miller MotoCzysz E1pc followed by (3) John McGuinness MUGEN Shinden in a race won by Michael Rutter MotoCzysz Elpc 6 June 2012 .

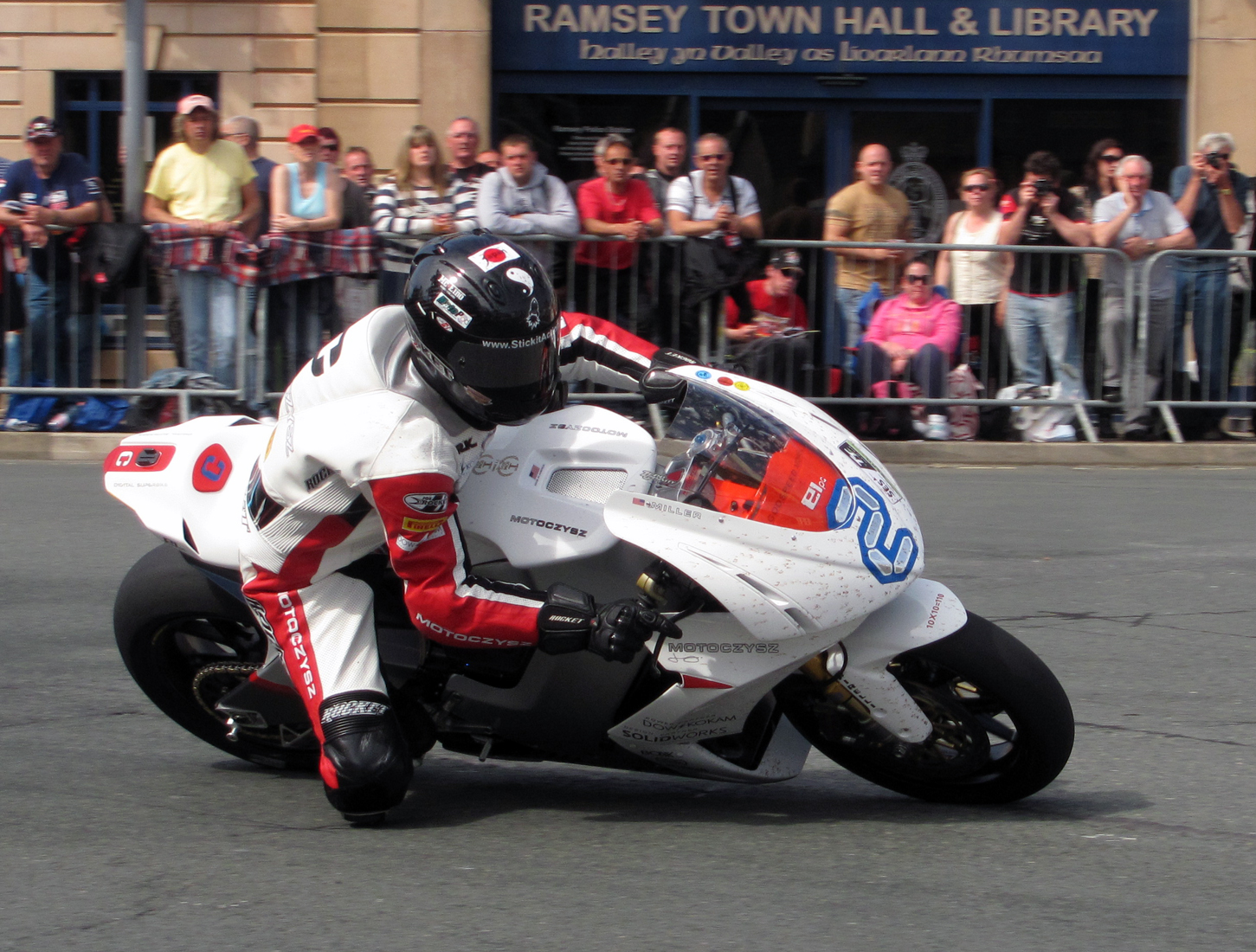
2013 Isle of Man TT TT Zero Practice Session
Mark Miller (2) MotoCzysz E1pc at Parliament Square, Ramsey 3 June 2013.

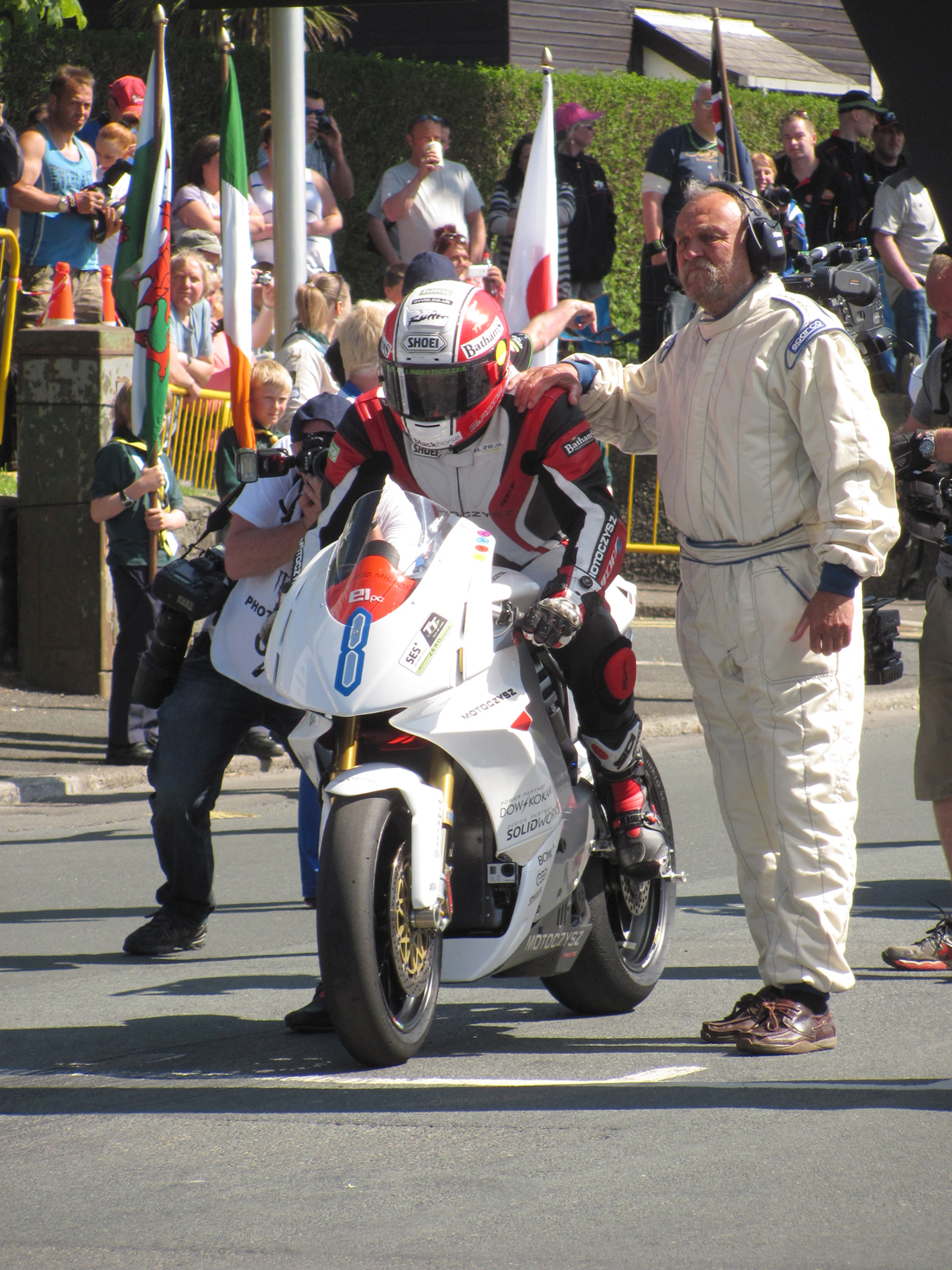
2013 Isle of Man TT TT Zero Race – Michael Rutter (1) MotoCzysz E1pc TT Grandstand 5 June 2013

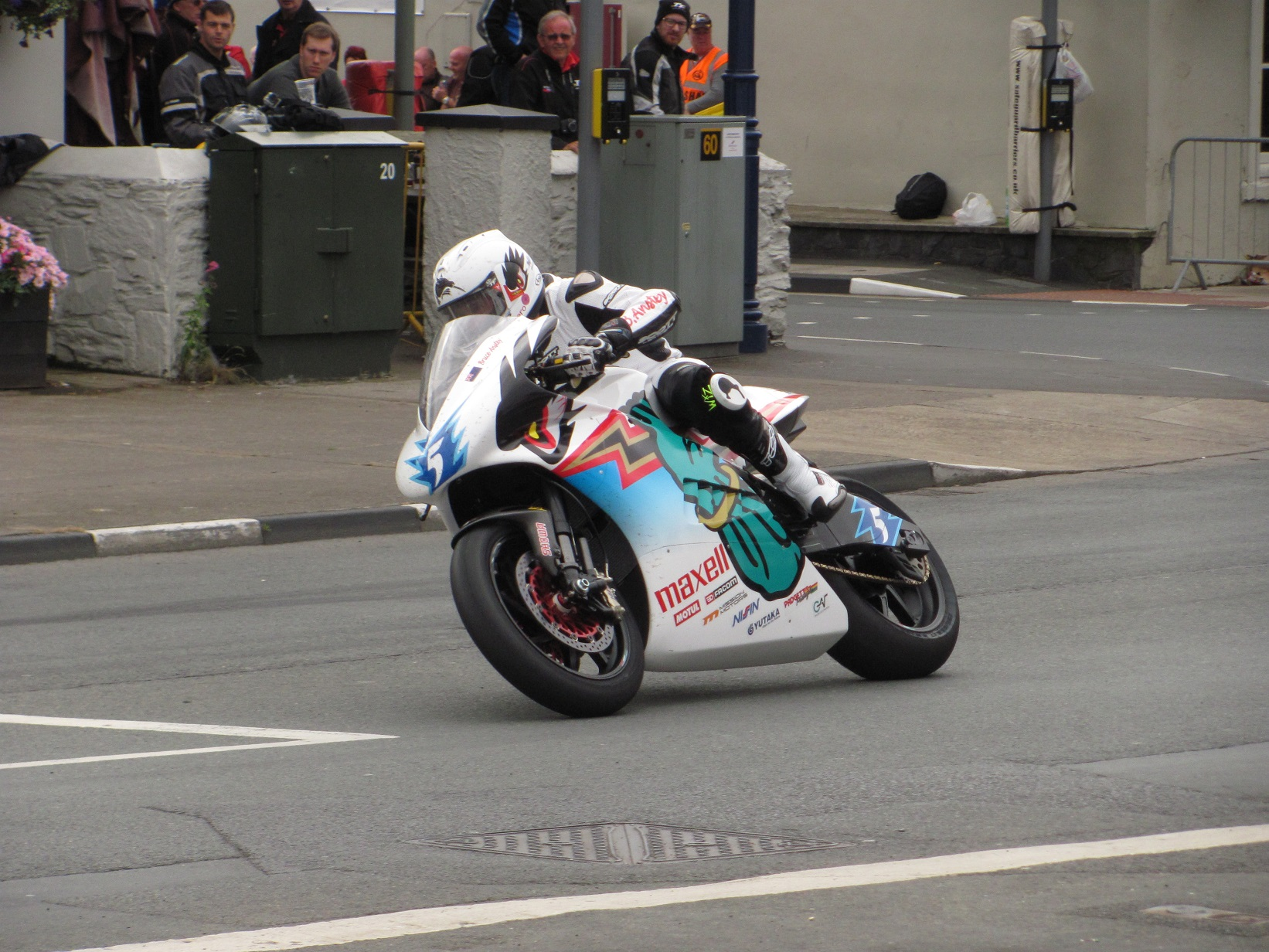
2014 Isle of Man TT TT Zero Practice Session
Bruce Anstey (5) Shinden San / Team Mugen at Parliament Square, Ramsey 1 June 2013.

== See also ==
- Lightweight TT
- Ultra-Lightweight TT
- Sidecar TT
- Junior TT
- Senior TT
- MotoE World Championship
- Electric motorsport
