= MotoCzysz E1pc =

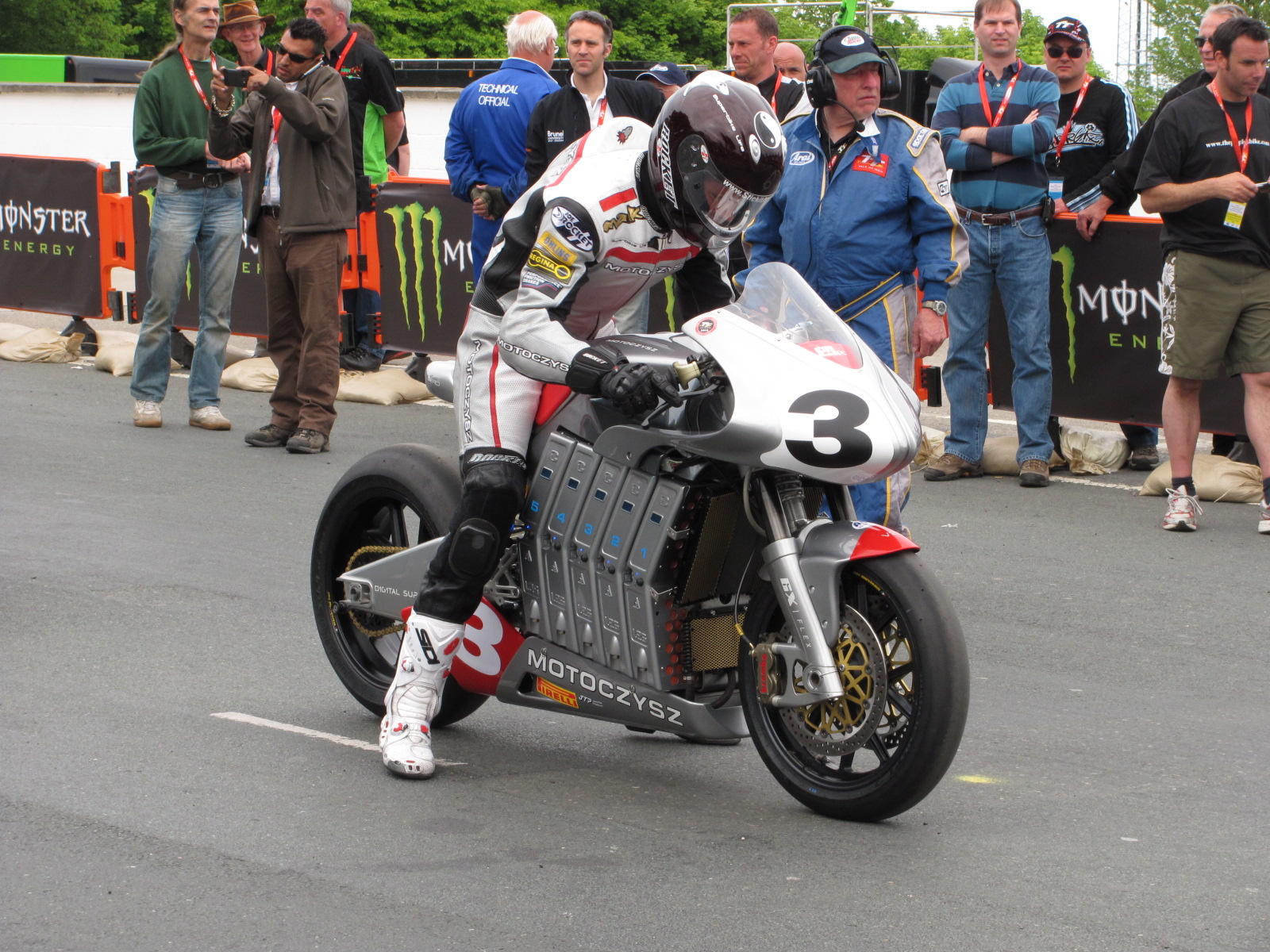
- Mark Miller – Team MotoCzysz E1pc;- TT Zero 2nd practice session for the 2010 Isle of Man TT Races 7 June 2010.
- Manufacturer: MotoCzysz
- Also called: E1pc
- Predecessor: c1
- Class: electric motorcycle

The MotoCzysz E1pc is the American motorcycle manufacturer MotoCzysz's electric motorcycle that won the 2010 TT Zero electric motorcycle race at the Isle of Man TT competition breaking the previous speed record.

== History and development ==
Michael Czysz said in an interview on the history of this electric motorcycle:

"In less than five months we took a suggestion and turned it into a motorcycle.

"A motorcycle that is unlike anything I have ever ridden. No gas, no oil, no clutch, no need to even warm up the engine – no engine.

"Gone is the age-old ritual of rhythmical throttle blips that can audible seduce a motorcyclist into a pre-ride trance – now your bike waits for you. Enter what may be the next big thing in motorcycles; invisible, nearly silent and magically linear power."

As of August 2010, the MotoCzysz team for the TTXGP was listed on the eGrandPrix website as:

- Michael Czysz: Technical Director & Designer
- Adrian Hawkins: Lead Engineer
- Marty Schmitz: Machinist
- Terry Czysz: Mechanic
- Levi Patton: Engineer
- Josh Gedlick: Modeler

with assistance from:

- Heath Knapp: Fabricator
- Loni Hull: Electrical Technician
- Andrea Pretzler: Surface Modeler
- Seth McBlair: Body Work / Paint

== Technical ==
The MotoCzysz E1pc is described as having "10 times the battery capacity of a Toyota Prius and 2.5 times the torque of a Ducati 1198 [in] a package that looks like something out of a 24th-century Thunderdome." The E1pc is powered by "10 individual lithium polymer cells that each weigh 19.5 Lbs (8.85 KG) and produce 12.5 kWh" and operates close to the maximum allowable 500 volts system. The motive force is provided by a "DC internal permanent magnet motor [called] 'D1g1tal Dr1ve' [and is] small enough to hide within the swingarm beneath the rear shock." The motor is oil-cooled developing 100 HP (75.6 KW) and 250 Lb-Ft (339 Nm) of torque, continuously.

== Racing ==
In June 2009, Mark Miller rode the E1pc in the TTXGP race on the 37.733-mile (60.725 km) mountain course of the Isle of Man Tourist Trophy but did not finish the race.

On June 10, 2010, US racer Mark Miller won the TT Zero race on the same course riding a redesigned E1pc with a time of 23 minutes 22.89 seconds and an average speed of 96.820 mph. Beyond the electric motorcycle technical accomplishment, this is "the first time an American-made bike has won a race at the Isle of Man since Indian debuted a two-speed gearbox in 1911," ridden by Briton Oliver Cyril Godfrey, "and only the second time an American rider has finished first there."

On July 25, 2010, Michael Czysz won the FIM e-Power race at Laguna Seca, riding his own creation.

On Wednesday, June 6, 2012, Michael Rutter and Team Segway Racing MotoCzysz made history on the Isle of Man by becoming the first team to record a 100 mph lap of the course in the SES TT Zero race in what is being hailed as one of the greatest achievements in the event's one hundred and five-year history. Rutter crossed the line in 21:45.33 (104.056 mph) closely followed by John McGuinness on the Team Mugen Shinden machine. Rutter's MotoCzysz teammate Mark Miller finished third, with all three breaking the prestigious 100 mph mark, which was first achieved in 1957 by Scotsman Bob McIntyre on a conventional bike.

For the 2013 TT races, Rutter on the MotoCzysz again won from McGuinness on a Mugen, with second MotoCzysz rider Mark Miller suffering mechanical breakdown just after Ballaugh, approximately one-half distance around the road course

== Gallery ==
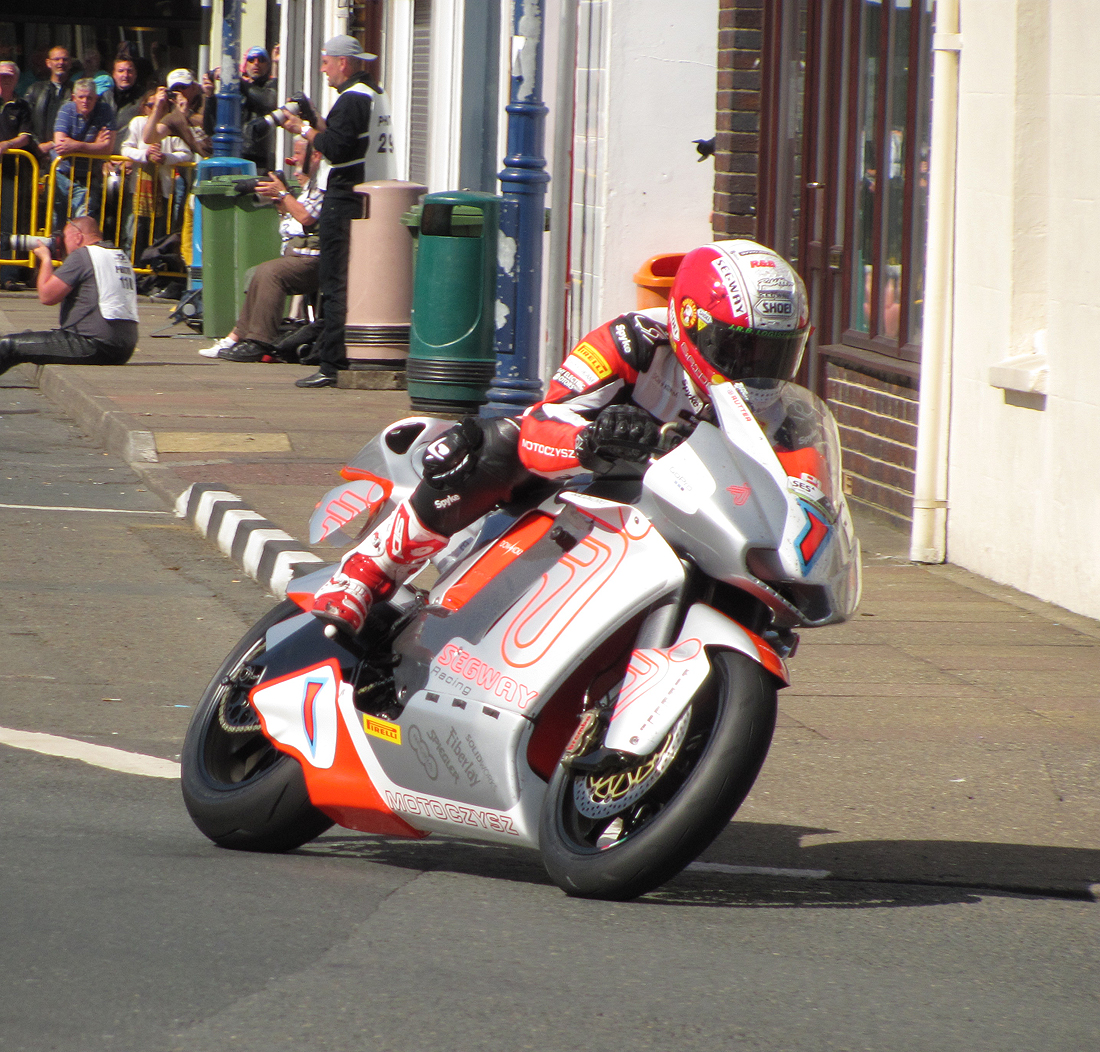
Michael Rutter exiting Parliament Square, Ramsey in 2012

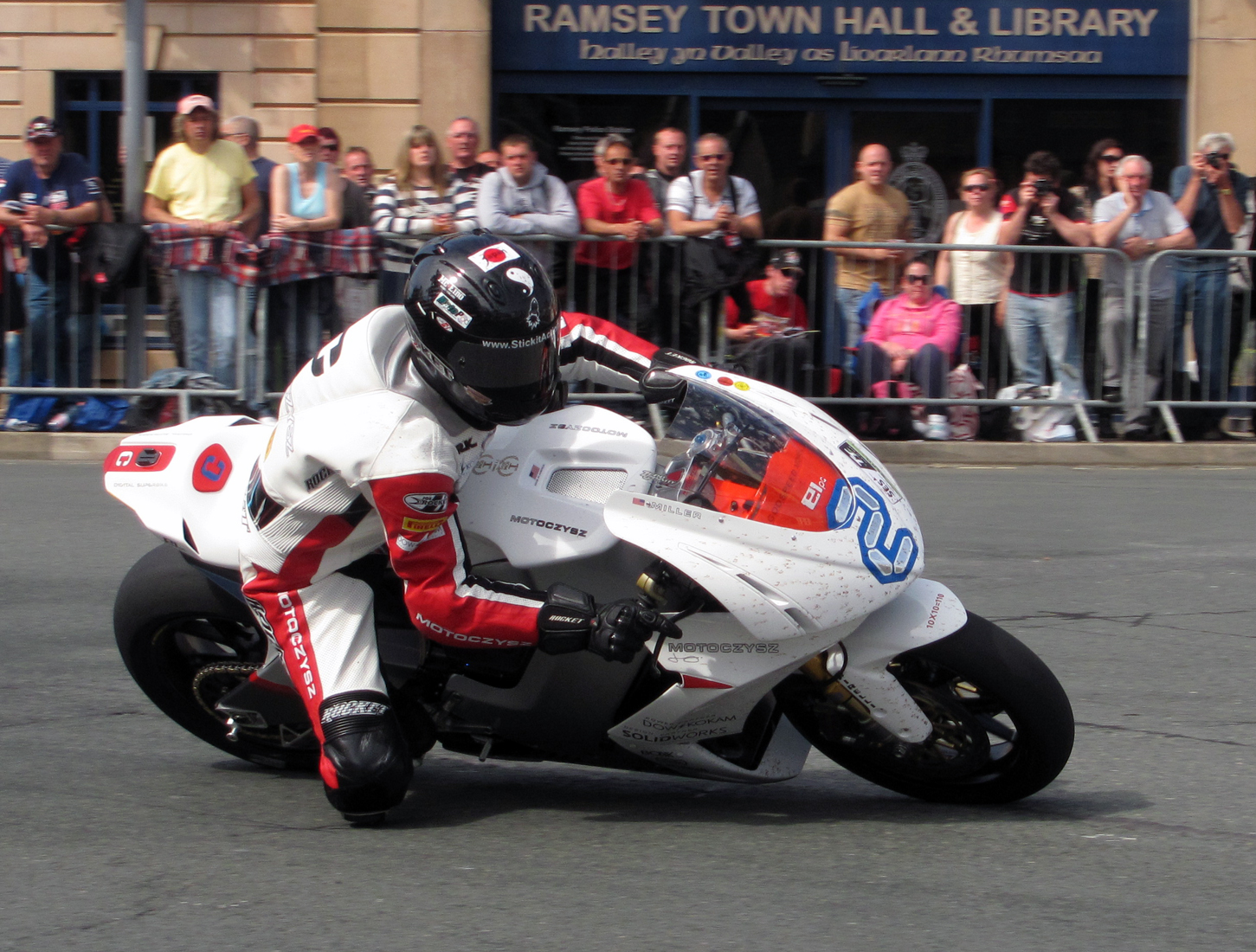
Mark Miller at Parliament Square, Ramsey during 2013 practice

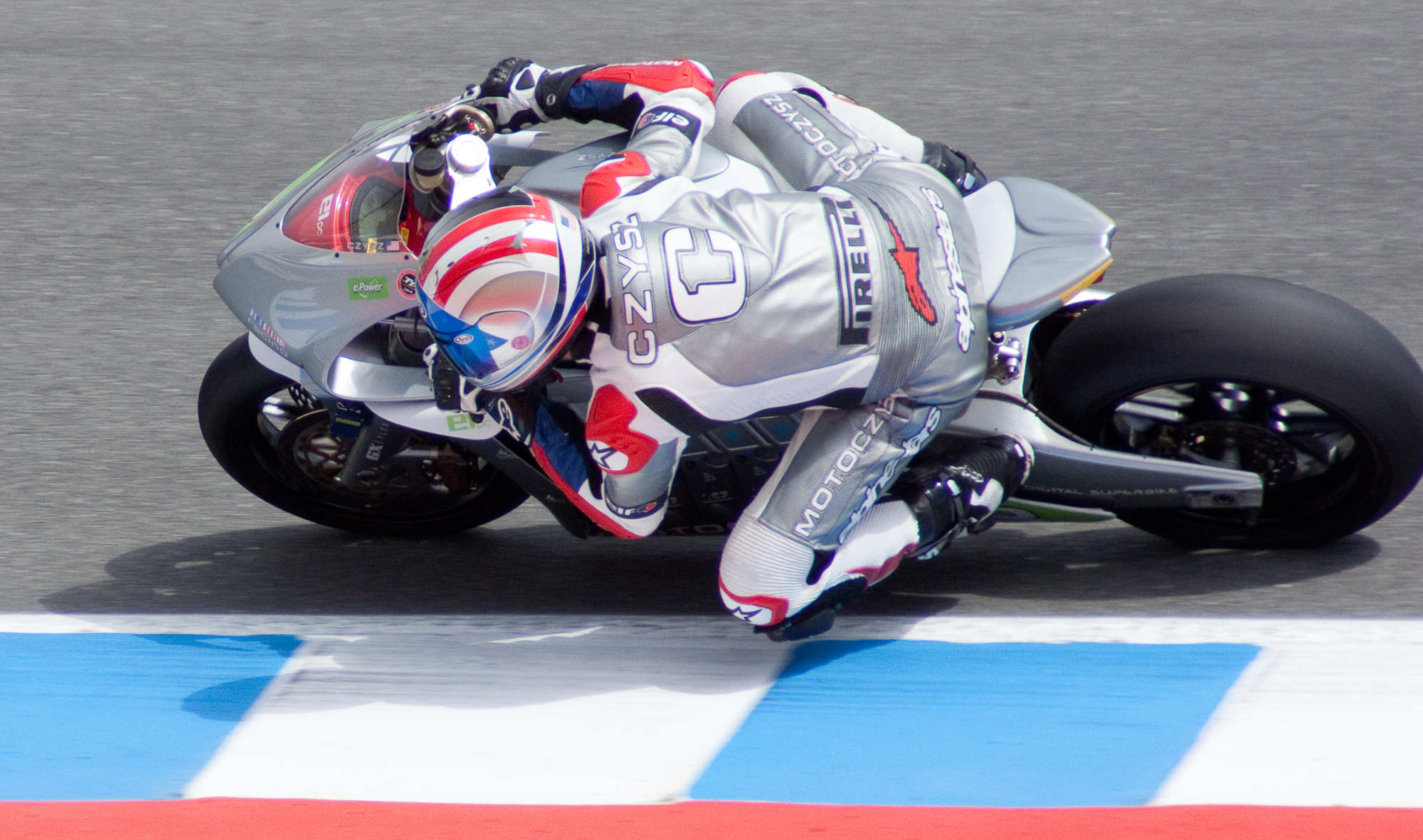
Laguna Seca, e-Power race, 25 July 2010, Michael Czysz on the MotoCzysz E1pc in Rainey Curve

== See also ==
- Electric motorcycle
- Electric motorsport
- MotoCzysz
