= Brammo =

Defunct American motor company

Brammo, Inc.
- Industry: Vehicle Manufacturing
- Founded: Ashland, Oregon (2002)
- Founder: Craig Bramscher
- Headquarters: Talent, Oregon, United States
- Area served: North America
- Key people: Craig Bramscher (Founder)
- Products: Electric vehicle drivetrains
- Owner: Cummins Inc.
- Website: Brammo.com

Brammo, Inc. was an American producer of electric traction motors and traction batteries based in Talent, Oregon, United States. Brammo also developed and sold a range of electric motorcycles via the company's website and motorcycle dealers throughout the United States, Europe, and Asia.

On January 15, 2015, Polaris Industries announced that it had purchased the entire electric motorcycle business from Brammo. Production of an electric motorcycle, the rebadged Victory Empulse, commenced at Polaris' factory in Spirit Lake, IA during the second half of 2015.

It was announced on October 16, 2017, that Brammo's remaining assets would be acquired by Cummins, with the deal expected to close by the end of the year.

== History ==
Brammo Motorsports began in Craig Bramscher's garage after he visited several Ferrari and Lamborghini dealerships in Hollywood and Los Angeles, California, looking for a supercar that he could comfortably sit in. Bramscher, who was a football player at his high school, Shawnee Mission South, is 6 ft 3 in (1.91 m) tall but has described himself as "long-waisted, so I sit like I'm 6 ft 6 in (1.98 m) tall." Bramscher set out to design and build a car comparable to the McLaren Formula 1 car, but which would comfortably accommodate a 6 ft 8 in (2.03 m) tall person weighing 300 lb (140 kg). On September 4, 2002, he registered the name "Brammo Motorsports" with the state of Oregon.

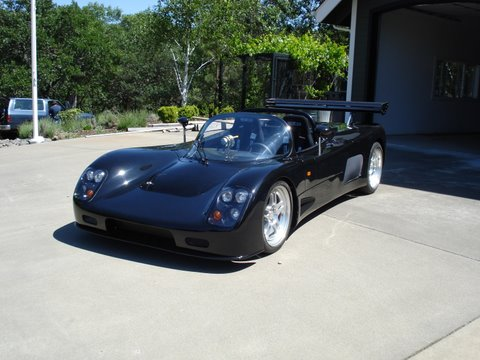
A Brammo-manufactured Ultima

Brammo began importing the Ultima Can Am in an attempt to understand at a basic level the components, tools, and processes needed to manufacture a complete vehicle. The company continued to import the cars from Ultima in component form, assemble them, and sell them to customers. Customers were offered "build journals," which enabled them to watch their vehicle being built in near real-time online.

=== 2004–2008 ===
==== Enertia GT ====
The Enertia GT was a car planned for production, intended to be powered by a naturally aspirated Falconer V12 engine. However, it has since been announced that the project has shifted to making the GT a battery electric vehicle to compete with the Tesla Roadster (2008).

==== Pro GT and Rogue GT ====
Brammo applied for a trademark of "Pro GT" in April 2004. Brammo finalized the design for the Brammo Motorsports Pro GT and hired Brian Wismann as the lead designer prior to building the prototype. The Pro GT prototype had a 600 cu in (9,800 cc) V12 engine producing 800 hp (600 kW). Brammo commissioned a six-speed transverse synchro-mesh gearbox with Xtrac, Inc., of Berkshire, England. They also built a custom Falconer V12 engine. Brammo changed the name of the Pro GT to the Rogue GT. They also imported some Gardner Douglas T70s, but demand for the vehicle was not sufficient. In 2006, Brammo executed an assignment of its interest in the trademark "Rogue" to Nissan Motors, which introduced the Nissan Rogue, a compact crossover SUV in October 2007.

==== Ariel Atom ====
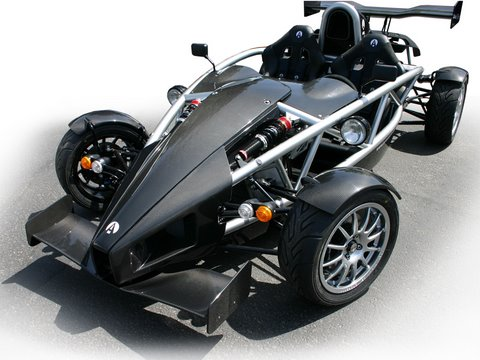
Brammo Ariel Atom

In early 2005, Brammo purchased a license to produce the Ariel Atom, an exo-skeletal vehicle designed by Nik Smart while he was a transport design student at Coventry University. Brammo's license allowed the company to produce the vehicle for the North American market only. After it secured the license from Ariel CEO Simon Saunders, Brammo reverse-engineered the vehicle, making several improvements along the way, and began production. The company could not secure the Honda engines which were installed in the UK versions of the car, so it approached GM and was able to obtain the supercharged GM Ecotec engine, although a limited run of ten of the Atoms came equipped with Honda K20A engines. The company sold just over 130 of the cars during a 20-month period. Jay Leno bought one of them and wrote an extensive review of it for Popular Mechanics.

==== Enertia Powercycle and Brammo, Inc. ====
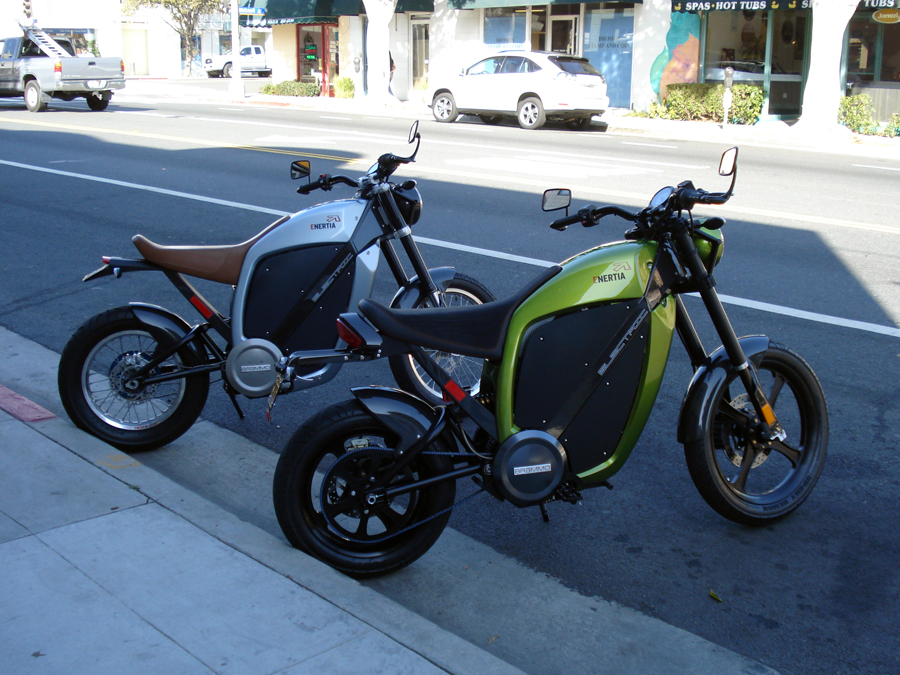
Brammo Enertia Powercycles

Brammo's experience with building supercars, coupled with its research of electric drivetrains and then-current battery technology led to the belief that with the power-to-weight ratio and energy density of lithium batteries, an EV was possible, but that the vehicle's weight was a crucial concern. The decision was made to produce a lighter motorcycle.

Brammo focused on designing and building the Enertia powercycle prototype. After completing the prototype, the company met with investors and determined that Brammo Motorsports needed to become Brammo, Inc., and that it would thereafter focus fully on electric vehicles. The name "Brammo, Inc." was registered in August 2008. In September 2008, Brammo raised a $10 million round from Best Buy, Venture Capital, Chrysalix Energy Venture Capital, and others.

=== 2009 ===
==== Best Buy sales agreement ====
In February 2009, Brammo announced that the Enertia would be sold at Best Buy stores on the West Coast, with a gradual roll-out to the electronic retailer's stores nationwide. Bramscher said, "what we're selling is a lot closer to consumer electronics than to transportation." He indicated that basic repairs and maintenance would be carried out by the Geek Squad crew while more intensive work would be performed at various service centers around the country. The Enertia began selling at select Best Buy locations in August 2009.

==== TTXGP ====
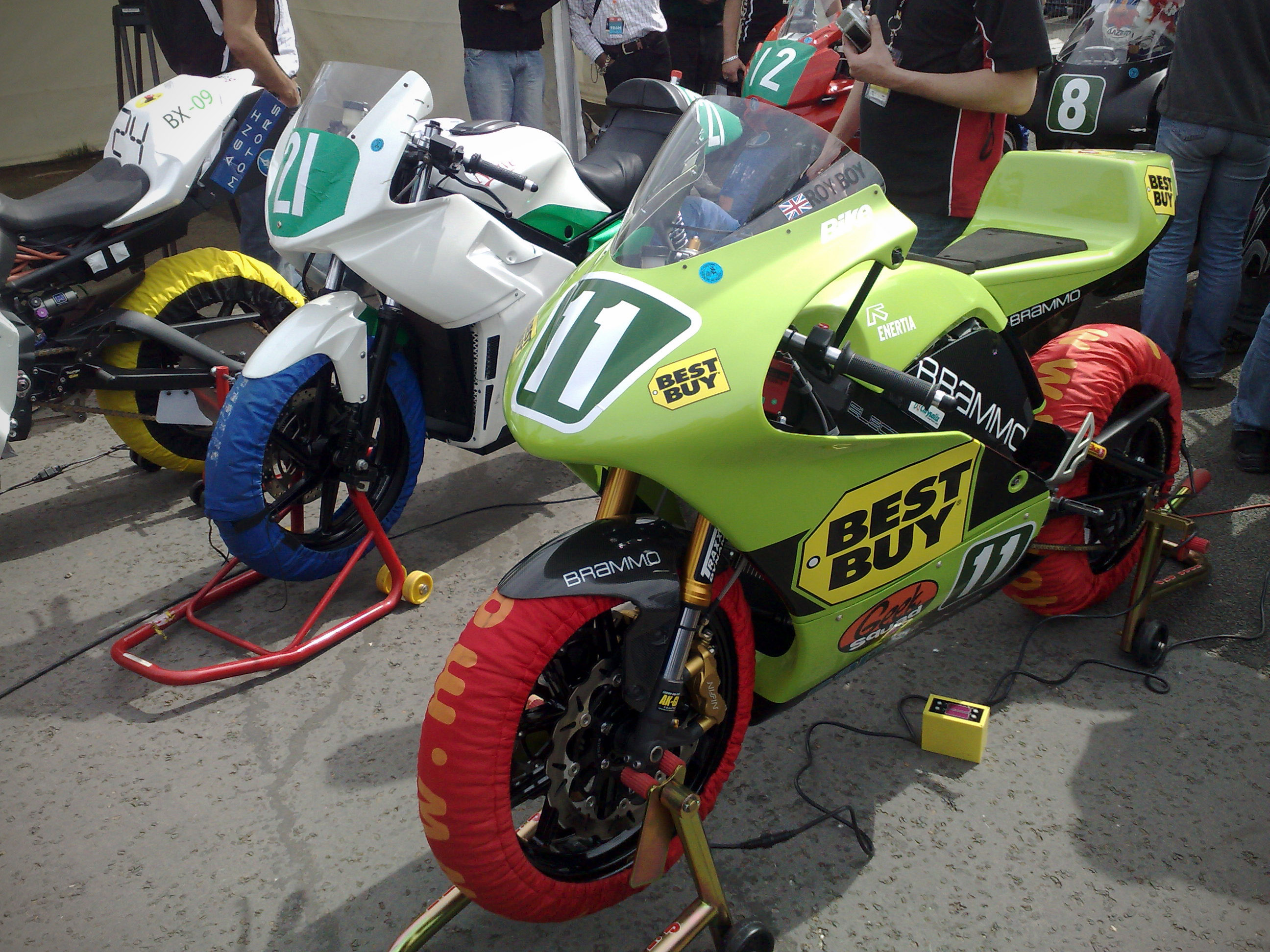
Brammo TTR at the TTXGP

In June 2009, Brammo entered two modified Enertia motorcycles in the Time Trial Xtreme Grand Prix (TTXGP), a motorcycle race billed as "the world's first zero-emissions superbike event." The race took place on June 12, 2009, on the Isle of Man's 37.7-mile (60.7 km) Snaefell Mountain Course. Brammo's #26 bike, a model it called the TTR, finished in third place during the final race. Scottish rider Mark Buckley finished with a time of 30 minutes, 2.64 seconds, an average speed of 75.35 mph (121.26 km/h), and reached a top speed of 102 mph (164 km/h).

=== 2010 ===
==== Empulse electric motorcycle ====
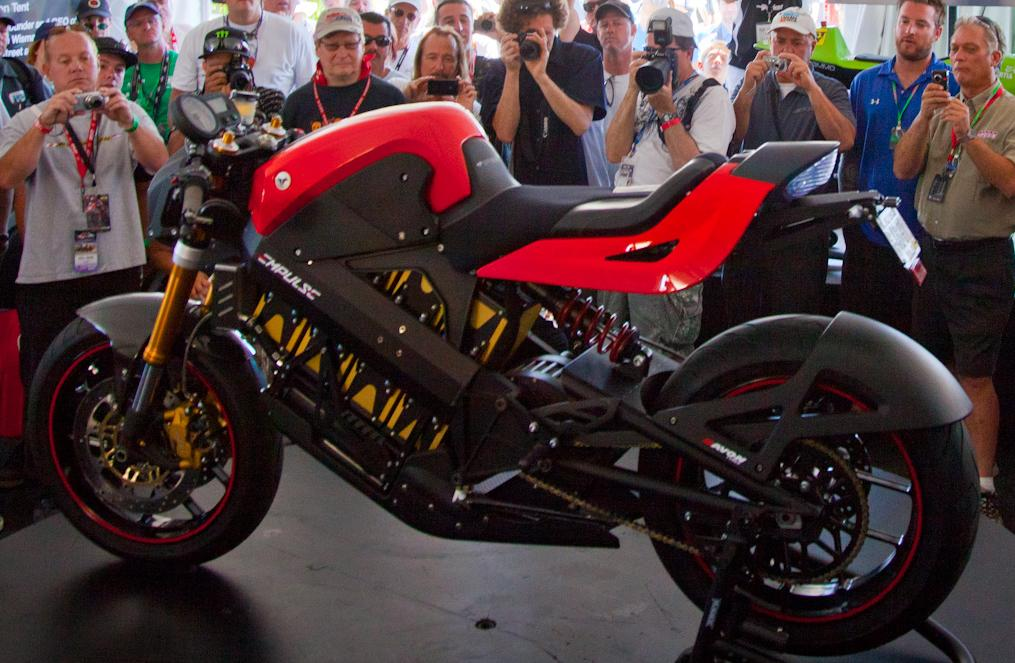
Brammo Empulse unveiled at Laguna Seca

In 2010, Brammo announced the Empulse Trio line of water-cooled electric motorcycles, with models 6.0, 8.0, and 10.0 offering an average range of 60, 80 or 100 miles respectively. Top speed is in excess of 100 miles per hour. Summer 2011 delivery was projected for orders placed in July 2010. The 2011 delivery date was later extended into 2012 due to the decision to incorporate a gearbox into the production model.

==== Flextronics outsourcing ====
In September 2010, Brammo announced an agreement to outsource motorcycle production to Flextronics. Brammo said the deal was made because of Flextronics' ability to supply Brammo with all its electronics needs and to move manufacturing closer to overseas consumers, rather than building on US assembly lines.

==== Enertia Plus electric motorcycle ====
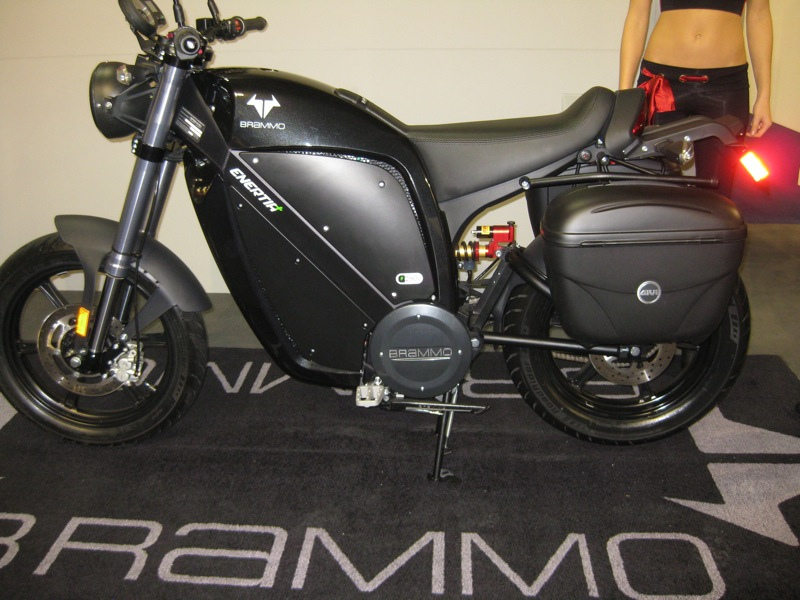
Brammo Enertia Plus revealed at EICMA

In October 2010, Brammo announced a new model of its Enertia motorcycle, called the Enertia Plus. Set for delivery in 2011, the Enertia Plus will have a 6.0 kWh Brammo Power lithium-ion battery pack. According to CEO Bramscher, the Enertia Plus is a zero-emissions motorcycle that will travel 80 miles on one charge, over 60 miles per hour, and should take about 6 hours to fully power up at any electric vehicle (EV) charging station with Level 1 capabilities.

=== 2011 ===
==== Engage and Encite models ====
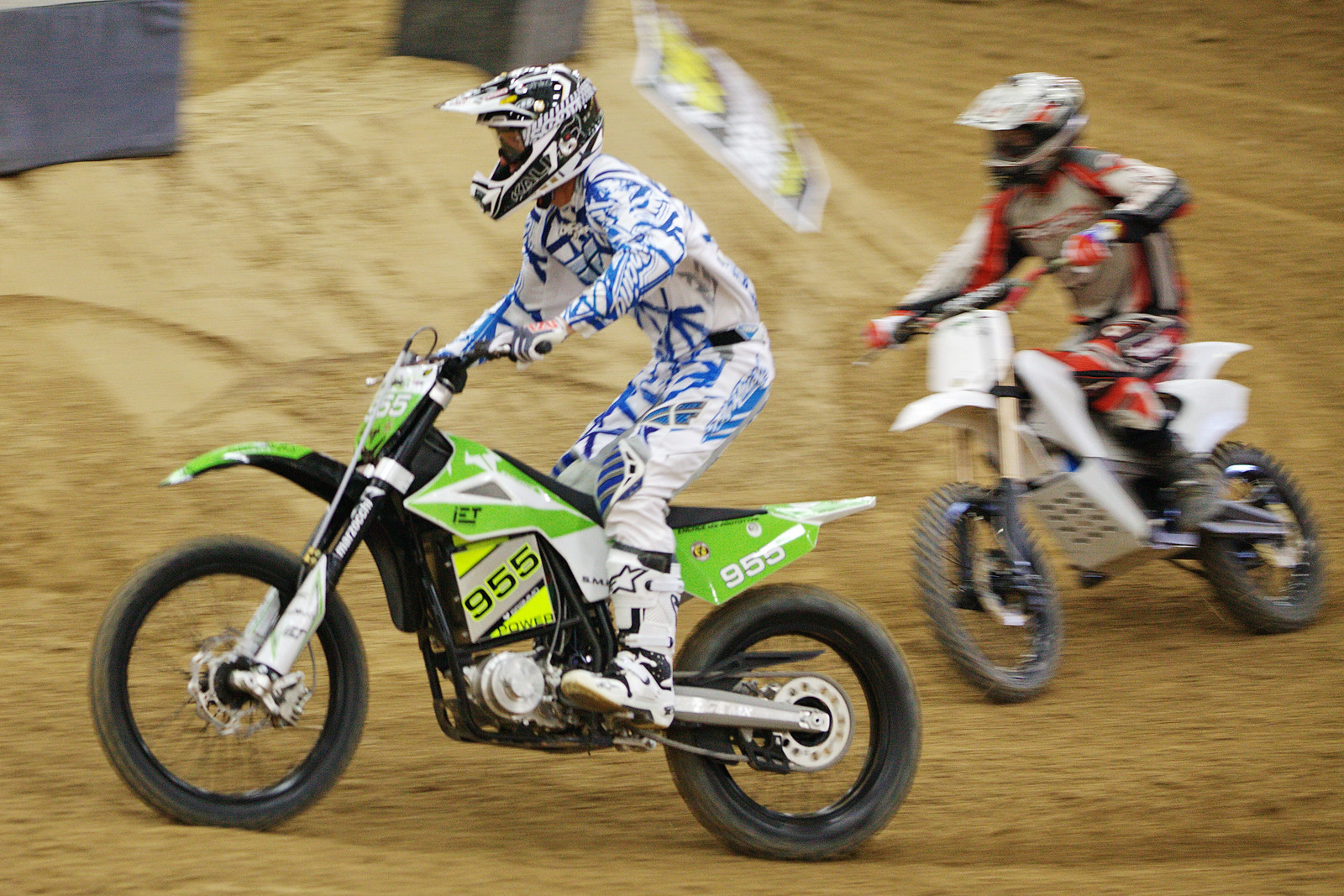
Brammo Engage at the Minimoto

In May 2011, Brammo announced two new models of electric motorcycle, the Engage and the Encite. The Engage is a full-sized dirtbike, available in both motocross (offroad) and supermoto (onroad, mostly) variants. The Encite MMX Pro, the smaller of the two bikes, was described as a more hardcore racing version. Along with the announcement of the two bikes came the announcement that the company had partnered with SMRE, an Engineering and Design firm based in Umbertide, Italy. SMRE had designed the mechatronic six-speed gearbox that the new bikes, in prototype form, were using.

==== TTXGP ====
On May 14 and 15, 2011, at Infineon Raceway, Brammo's Empulse RR racing motorcycle won the first two races of the TTXGP North American Series, also known as the A123 Infineon Round. The motorcycle was ridden by Steve Atlas, an AMA credentialed racer and a contributing editor for Motorcycle-USA.com. During the race on Sunday, the Empulse RR broke the track record for electric motorcycles, set the previous year by the Zero-Agni machine, ridden by Shawn Higbee.

In July 2011, Brammo announced it had entered a partnership with TTXGP to provide race-ready rides for the TTXGP electric racing series for the 2013 season. Brammo indicated that it would provide box-stock Empulse motorcycles to the TTXGP through Mavizen, the electric motorcycle startup launched by TTXGP founder Azhar Hussain. Mavizen and Brammo would develop a "race kit" including racing bodywork, unspecified "race performance upgrades" and track-side tech support.

Although Brammo's Empulse RR racing motorcycle took third place at the TTXGP race at Miller Motorsports Park in Utah on the weekend of September 2, 2011, its position and prior points earned in the racing series guaranteed it the title of TTXGP North American Champion. The electric racing motorcycle was piloted by Steve Atlas, who had given the team consistent speed and performance throughout the 2011 season.

==== Acquisitions and investments ====
In September 2011, Brammo acquired European bike rental company QuantyaParx. Brammo said they would be expanding the business to the United States.

In October 2011, Polaris Industries announced an investment in Brammo. Polaris had previously produced an electric version of its Ranger Side-by-Side, and acquired Global Electric Motorcars (GEM) from Chrysler. An analyst concluded that Polaris intends to add electric drivetrains to its ATV and motorcycle product lineup, but were likely to wait for further technology advancements before bringing them to snowmobiles.

==== Hong Kong police and municipal use ====
In October 2011, Hong Kong's Government Logistics Department announced that it would be replacing Hong Kong Police Force and Water Supplies Department gasoline-powered motorcycles with Brammo Enertia Plus "LE" (Law Enforcement) electric motorcycles. The Hong Kong Police Force had been using several Enertia motorcycles as part of pilot project for over a year.

=== 2012 ===
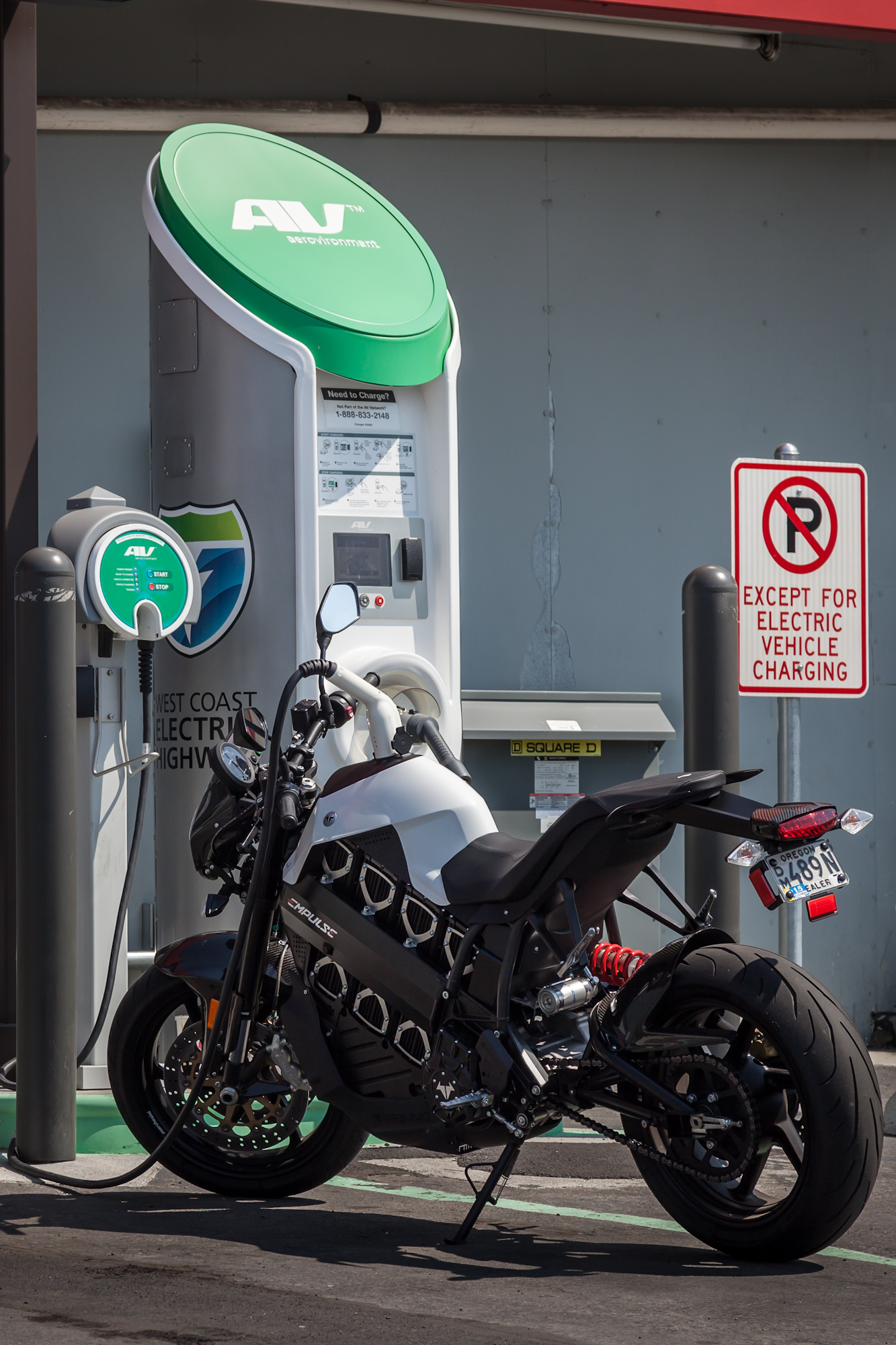
A Brammo Empulse at charging station, August 2012

In December, a United States customer took delivery of the first Empulse R.

==== Empulse R ride reviews ====
Wired reviewed the Brammo Empulse R in August 2012. After riding on the Green Springs Highway north of Ashland, Oregon, the reviewer wrote that the Empulse R "uses the benefits of electric propulsion to achieve real performance benefits over internal-combustion-engine sportbikes[.]" The review found that the Empulse's performance on curving roads rivaled the Triumph Street Triple and its performance on straight roads felt "just a touch behind middleweight naked bikes like the Suzuki SV650 or Kawasaki Ninja 650." Regarding the six-speed gearbox, the review found that it instilled rider involvement and enabled the motorcycle to "maximize both efficiency and power at any speed range." The ride test found that the bike achieved the 105 mph (169 km/h) top speed and, in a ride that averaged 70 mph (110 km/h), the bike had a realistic range of 75-mile (121 km).

==== TTXGP World Championship ====
Steve Atlas, starting from the second position on a Brammo's Empulse RR, won the 2012 TTXGP World Championship at Daytona International Speedway. The event was the first electric vehicle race held at the Daytona track.

=== 2015 ===
On January 15, 2015, Polaris Industries announced that it had purchased the entire electric motorcycle business from Brammo. Production of an electric motorcycle, the rebadged Victory Empulse, commenced at Polaris' factory in Spirit Lake, IA during the second half of 2015.

=== 2017 ===
In 2017 Polaris announced that they were reluctantly closing down their Victory Motorcycles brand.

== Product awards ==
- Enertia — 2010 Silver Edison Awards
- Brammo — Motorcycle.com Best of 2011, honorable mention for best electric
- Empulse — Popular Science "Best of What's New 2011" (automotive category)
- Empulse — GQ "Best stuff of the year 2012"
- Empulse R — Playboy "2013 Motorcycle of the Year" and "Best Electric"
