= 2012 Manx Grand Prix =

(Isle of Man) 2012 Manx Grand Prix
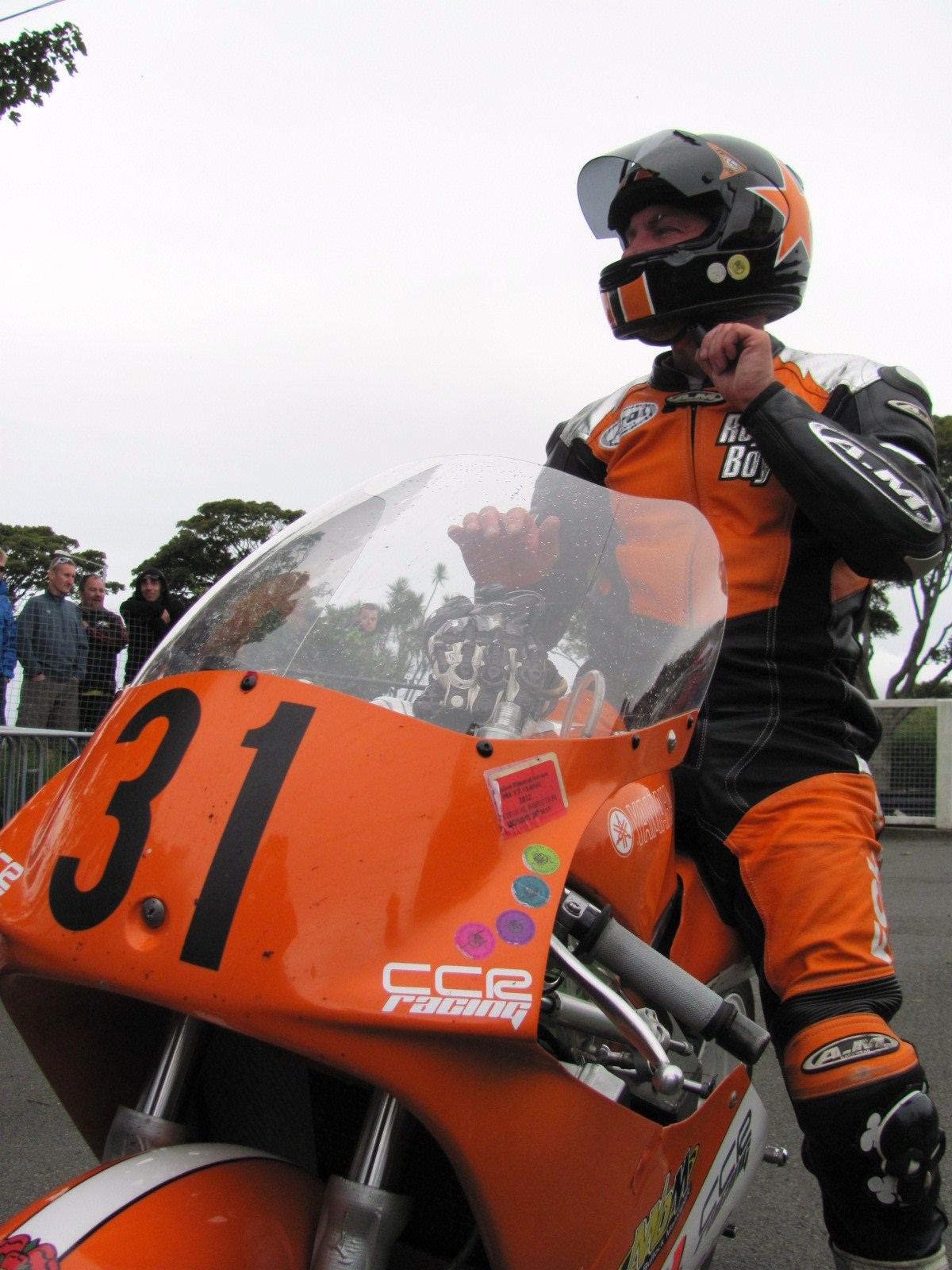
- Winners Enclosure 2012 Junior Post Classic Manx Grand Prix – Roy Richardson (31) 250 cc Yamaha TT Grandstand Friday 31 August 2012

Race details
Date	18–31 August 2012
Location	Douglas, Isle of Man
Course	Road Course; 37.733 mi (60.725 km)

Newcomers Race'A'
Pole Position	Fastest Lap
(Northern Ireland) John Simpson	(Northern Ireland) John Simpson
113.394 mph	109.808 mph
Podium
1. (Czech Republic) Kamil Holan
2. (England) Andrew Soar	3. (Isle of Man) Dean Roberts

Newcomers Race'B'
Pole Position	Fastest Lap
(Isle of Man) Andrew Dudgeon	(Isle of Man) Andrew Dudgeon
104.798 mph	103.580 mph
Podium
1. (Isle of Man) Andrew Dudgeon
2. (England) Gary Gittins	3. (England) Colin Stephenson

Newcomers Race'C'
Pole Position	Fastest Lap
(England) James Cowton	(England) James Cowton
103.575 mph	99.523 mph
Podium
1. (England) James Cowton
2. (Belgium) Renzo van der Donckt	3. (England) Ben Palmer

2012 Manx Grand Prix Festival and Races were held between Saturday 18 August and Friday 31 August 2012 on the 37.73-mile Snaefell Mountain Course.

The Blue Riband event of the Manx Grand Prix Festival the 2012 Senior Manx Grand Prix held in damp conditions and rain produced an unexpected win for the Newcomer John Simpson riding a 675 cc Triumph at an average race speed of 106.526 mph. It was the first time the Triumph marque had won the prestigious Senior Manx Grand Prix since Don Crossley victory in the 1948 event at an average race speed of 80.63 mph and also the first Newcomer winner of the Senior Manx Grand Prix since Geoff Duke won the 1949 race at an average speed of 86.063 mph riding a Norton motor-cycle. After victory in the Junior Classic Race by Roy Richardson riding a 250 cc Yamaha raised his tally to 10 victories in the Manx Grand Prix Races with Ryan Farquhar also equaling the same total with a win in the Senior Classic Race riding a 500 cc Paton motor-cycle. Held over a reduced race distance of 3 laps the Junior Classic Race was won by Chris Palmer riding a 350 cc Honda and also a first time win in the Lightweight Classic Race for Peter Symes with a 250 cc Suzuki machine. The Junior Manx Grand Prix also produced another first time winner for Wayne Kirwan riding a 600 cc Yamaha motor-cycle after dominating most of the race and along with Nigel Moore in the Super-Twins race with a 650 cc Kawasaki also winning his first Manx Grand Prix. During the Super-Twin Race, while holding 2nd place, Trevor Fergusson crashed fatally at The Nook near to Governor's Bridge on the second lap.

After his father Robert Dunlop won the 1983 Newcomers Junior Manx Grand Prix the 2012 Classic Superbike race was won by Michael Dunlop at an average race speed of 112.545 mph to produce his second win on the Mountain Course during the 2012 racing season after also winning the 2012 Superstock TT race and raising his own tally to three Manx Grand Prix wins. The Newcomers Race was delayed by 1 hour due to weather conditions between the Bungalow and Brandywell produced the first Manx Grand Prix win by a competitor from the Czech Republic when Kamil Holan won the Newcomers Race 'A' at an average race speed of 106.683 mph riding a 600 cc Yamaha motor-cycle. Taking advantage of local knowledge in the inclement weather conditions on the Mountain section of course, the Isle of Man competitor Andrew Dudgeon won the Newcomers Race 'B' riding a 650 cc Kawasaki Super-Twin machine. The reintroduced Newcomers Race 'C' produced a win for James Cowton riding a 400 cc Honda motor-cycle.

Difficult weather conditions during Practice Week caused the first Saturday evening to be cancelled due to mist and fog on the Mountain Section of the circuit and also the Clerk of Course not being able to raise the minimum number of race marshals for the event. Problems with the weather continued on the first Monday evening practice session with the first practice session red flagged after 1 lap and the second Monday evening session the competitors were red-flagged at Parliament Square, Ramsey and then escorted back to the TT Grandstand by Travelling Marshals. The mixed weather conditions continued during the rest of Manx Grand Practice week and during Wednesday the evening session was red-flagged again to attend to an injured competitor near to Sarah's Cottage. After the commencement of the Friday evening Practice being delayed by a road traffic accident the session was later abandoned after a fatal accident to Manx Grand Prix newcomer Steve Osborne on Quarterbridge Road.

== Results ==
=== Practice Times ===
==== 2012 Senior Manx Grand Prix Practice Times & Leaderboard ====
- Plates; Black on Yellow.

Rank	Rider	Sat 18 Aug	Mon 20 Aug	Tues 21 Aug	Wed 22 Aug	Thurs 23 Aug	Fri 24 Aug
1	(England) Jamie Coward; 600 cc Suzuki	Cancelled; No Time	—— No Time	20' 16.523; 111.650 mph	18' 56.37; 119.528 mph	19' 08.957; 118.220 mph	Cancelled; No Time
2	(Republic of Ireland) Wayne Kirwan; 600 cc Suzuki	Cancelled; No Time	—— No Time	21' 53.536; 103.410 mph	19' 33.00; 115.796 mph	19' 56.441; 113.530 mph	Cancelled; No Time
3	(Northern Ireland) Stephen McKnight; 600 cc Yamaha	Cancelled; No Time	—— No Time	21' 14.723; 106.550 mph	20' 06.59; 112.572 mph	19' 40.109; 115.098 mph	Cancelled; No Time
4	(Isle of Man) Paul Smyth; 749 cc Suzuki	Cancelled; No Time	—— No Time	—— No Time	19' 49.75; 114.166 mph	19' 42.733; 114.842 mph	Cancelled; No Time
5	(England) Mike Minns; 600 cc Yamaha	Cancelled; No Time	—— No Time	21' 58.742; 103.000 mph	19' 55.01; 113.663 mph	19' 46.882; 114.441 mph	Cancelled; No Time
6	(Scotland) Andy Lawson; 600 cc Kawasaki	Cancelled; No Time	—— No Time	22' 20.678; 101.310 mph	20' 39.56; 109.578 mph	19' 53.101; 113.845 mph	Cancelled; No Time
7	(Northern Ireland) John Simpson; 675 cc Triumph	Cancelled; No Time	—— No Time	22' 00.682; 102.850 mph	20' 09.33; 112.317 mph	19' 57.845; 113.390 mph	Cancelled; No Time
8	(England) Ross Johnson; 600 cc Yamaha	Cancelled; No Time	—— No Time	23' 14.696; 97.390 mph	20' 53.46; 108.362 mph	19' 59.415; 113.245 mph	Cancelled; No Time
9	(England) Stephen Harper; 675 cc Triumph	Cancelled; No Time	—— No Time	22' 49.421; 99.190 mph	20' 10.48; 112.210 mph	20' 03.186; 112.890 mph	Cancelled; No Time
10	(Isle of Man) Glyn Jones; 750 cc Suzuki	Cancelled; No Time	—— No Time	—— No Time	20' 17.96; 112.210 mph	20' 03.590; 112.852 mph	Cancelled; No Time
11	(England) Peter Symes; 750 cc Suzuki	Cancelled; No Time	—— No Time	21' 54.401; 103.340 mph	—— No Time	20' 06.408; 112.589 mph	Cancelled; No Time
12	(England) Michael Moulai; 750 cc Suzuki	Cancelled; No Time	—— No Time	—— No Time	20' 50.88; 108.586 mp	20' 06.663; 112.565 mph	Cancelled; No Time
13	(Isle of Man) Jonathan Woodward; 675 cc Triumph	Cancelled; No Time	—— No Time	22' 00.682; 102.850 mph	20' 09.33; 112.317 mph	20' 07.044; 112.529 mph	Cancelled; No Time
14	(England) Stuart Hall; 600 cc Honda	Cancelled; No Time	—— No Time	21' 53.409; 103.420 mph	20' 25.42; 110.842 mph	20' 09.148; 112.334 mph	Cancelled; No Time
15	(England) Rodger Wibberley; 600 cc Kawasaki	Cancelled; No Time	—— No Time	21' 50.472; 103.650 mph	—— No Time	20' 15.648; 111.733 mph	Cancelled; No Time
16	(Republic of Ireland) Michael Sweeney; 750 cc Suzuki	Cancelled; No Time	—— No Time	21' 48.725; 103.790 mph	20' 19.963; 111.338 mph	—— No Time	Cancelled; No Time
17	(Isle of Man) Carl Roberts; 600 cc Suzuki	Cancelled; No Time	—— No Time	22' 443; 100.510 mph	20' 30.91; 110.348 mph	20' 27.725; 110.634 mph	Cancelled; No Time
18	(Northern Ireland) Trevor Fergusson; 750 cc Suzuki	Cancelled; No Time	—— No Time	—— No Time	—— No Time	20' 28.485; 110.565 mph	Cancelled; No Time
19	(Isle of Man) Andy Fenton; 750 cc Suzuki	Cancelled; No Time	—— No Time	—— No Time	20' 32.49; 110.206 mph	20' 34.790; 110.001 mph	Cancelled; No Time
20	(Isle of Man) Peter Simpson; 600 cc Suzuki	Cancelled; No Time	—— No Time	25' 00.575; 90.520 mph	20' 50.88; 108.586 mph	20' 34.790; 110.001 mph	Cancelled; No Time

==== 2012 Junior Manx Grand Prix Practice Times & Leaderboard ====
- Plates; White numbers on Blue.

Rank	Rider	Sat 18 Aug	Mon 20 Aug	Tues 21 Aug	Wed 22 Aug	Thurs 23 Aug	Fri 24 Aug
1	(England) Jamie Coward; 600 cc Suzuki	Cancelled; No Time	—— No Time	20' 16.523; 111.650 mph	18' 56.37; 119.528 mph	19' 08.957; 118.220 mph	Cancelled; No Time
2	(Republic of Ireland) Wayne Kirwan; 600 cc Suzuki	Cancelled; No Time	—— No Time	21' 53.536; 103.410 mph	19' 33.00; 115.796 mph	19' 56.441; 113.530 mph	Cancelled; No Time
3	(Northern Ireland) Stephen McKnight; 600 cc Yamaha	Cancelled; No Time	—— No Time	21' 14.723; 106.550 mph	20' 06.59; 112.572 mph	19' 40.109; 115.098 mph	Cancelled; No Time
4	(England) Mike Minns; 600 cc Yamaha	Cancelled; No Time	—— No Time	21' 58.742; 103.000 mph	19' 55.01; 113.663 mph	19' 46.882; 114.441 mph	Cancelled; No Time
5	(Republic of Ireland) Michael Sweeney; 600 cc Yamaha	Cancelled; No Time	—— No Time	—— No Time	—— No Time	19' 53.162; 113.934 mph	Cancelled; No Time
6	(Scotland) Andy Lawson; 600 cc Kawasaki	Cancelled; No Time	—— No Time	22' 20.678; 101.310 mph	20' 39.56; 109.578 mph	19' 53.101; 113.845 mph	Cancelled; No Time
7	(England) James Cowton; 600 cc Honda	Cancelled; No Time	—— No Time	—— No Time	—— No Time	19' 54.423; 113.245 mph	Cancelled; No Time
8	(Northern Ireland) John Simpson; 675 cc Triumph	Cancelled; No Time	—— No Time	22' 00.682; 102.850 mph	20' 09.33; 112.317 mph	19' 57.845; 113.390 mph	Cancelled; No Time
9	(England) Ross Johnson; 600 cc Yamaha	Cancelled; No Time	—— No Time	23' 14.696; 97.390 mph	20' 53.46; 108.362 mph	19' 59.415; 113.245 mph	Cancelled; No Time
10	(England) Stephen Harper; 675 cc Triumph	Cancelled; No Time	—— No Time	22' 49.421; 99.190 mph	20' 10.48; 112.210 mph	20' 03.186; 112.890 mph	Cancelled; No Time

==== 2012 Newcomers Race 'A' Practice Times & Leaderboard ====
- Plates; White Digits on Red Plates.

Rank	Rider	Sat 18 Aug	Mon 20 Aug	Tues 21 Aug	Wed 22 Aug	Thurs 23 Aug	Fri 24 Aug
1	(Northern Ireland) John Simpson; 675 cc Triumph	Cancelled; No Time	—— No Time	22' 22.647; 101.160 mph	21' 14.24; 106.595 mph	19' 57.845; 113.394 mph	Cancelled; No Time
2	(Czech Republic) Kamil Holan; 600 cc Yamaha	Cancelled; No Time	—— No Time	22' 23.944; 101.070 mph	21' 40.80; 104.418 mph	20' 34.691; 110.010 mph	Cancelled; No Time
3	(Sweden) Björn Gunnarsson; 600 cc Honda	Cancelled; No Time	—— No Time	21' 14.723; 106.550 mph	20' 58.01; 107.971 mph	20' 50.460; 108.622 mph	Cancelled; No Time
4	(England) Andrew Soar; 750 cc Suzuki	Cancelled; No Time	—— No Time	22' 19.838; 101.380 mph	—— No Time	20' 56.232; 108.123 mph	Cancelled; No Time
5	(Isle of Man) Dean Roberts; 600 cc Honda	Cancelled; No Time	—— No Time	22' 35.232; 100.220 mph	21' 10.15; 106.939 mph	20' 58.111; 107.962 mph	Cancelled; No Time
6	(Denmark) Thilo Haefele; 600 cc Yamaha	Cancelled; No Time	—— No Time	24' 31.706; 92.290 mph	21' 47.05; 103.919 mph	21' 04.684; 107.401 mph	Cancelled; No Time
7	(Netherlands) Peter Heilmans; 599 cc Honda	Cancelled; No Time	—— No Time	22' 45.8192; 99.450 mph	21' 32.25; 105.110 mph	21' 15.918; 106.455 mph	Cancelled; No Time
8	(Netherlands) Michael Hofman; 600 cc Kawasaki	Cancelled; No Time	—— No Time	23' 02.850; 98.220 mph	22' 06.83; 102.370 mph	21' 25.888; 105.630 mph	Cancelled; No Time
9	(England) Jamie Hodson; 600 cc Yamaha	Cancelled; No Time	—— No Time	22' 35.831; 95.940 mph	22' 28.54; 100.722 mph	21' 30.096; 105.285 mph	Cancelled; No Time
10	(England) Oliver Dupuy; 600 cc Yamaha	Cancelled; No Time	—— No Time	—— No Time	21' 42.24; 104.304 mph	23' 24.377; 96.720 mph	Cancelled; No Time

==== 2012 Newcomers Race 'B' Practice Times & Leaderboard ====
- Plates; White Digits on Red Plates.

Rank	Rider	Sat 18 Aug	Mon 20 Aug	Tues 21 Aug	Wed 22 Aug	Thurs 23 Aug	Fri 24 Aug
1	(Isle of Man) Andrew Dudgeon; 650 cc Kawasaki	Cancelled; No Time	—— No Time	24' 10.398; 93.650 mph	21' 48.82; 103.779 mph	21' 36.088; 104.798 mph	Cancelled; No Time
2	(England) Gary Gittins; 650 cc Suzuki	Cancelled; No Time	—— No Time	24' 49.823; 101.070 mph	22' 42.92; 91.170 mph	21' 56.581; 103.167 mph	Cancelled; No Time
3	(England) Rob Hodson; 650 cc Kawasaki	Cancelled; No Time	—— No Time	25' 11.960; 89.840 mph	22' 38.53; 99.982 mph	22' 11.221; 102.033 mph	Cancelled; No Time
4	(England) Colin Stephenson; 650 cc Suzuki	Cancelled; No Time	—— No Time	24' 35.217; 92.070 mph	22' 15.84; 101.680 mph	22' 14.8382; 101.756 mph	Cancelled; No Time
5	(England) Rad Hughes; 650 cc Kawasaki	Cancelled; No Time	—— No Time	25' 39.781; 88.210 mph	23' 31.25; 96.247 mph	22' 40.367; 99.847 mph	Cancelled; No Time
6	(England) Gabrielle Burne; 650 cc Suzuki	Cancelled; No Time	—— No Time	26' 19.700; 85.980 mph	24' 28.32; 92.506 mph	23' 23.095; 98.806 mph	Cancelled; No Time
7	(England) Timothy Moorhead; 650 cc Suzuki	Cancelled; No Time	—— No Time	25' 42.608; 88.050 mph	23' 37.94; 95.793 mph	23' 36.865; 95.865 mph	Cancelled; No Time
8	(Northern Ireland) Mark Shields; 650 cc Suzuki	Cancelled; No Time	—— No Time	30' 17.930; 74.720 mph	25' 13.60; 89.739 mph	24' 33.480; 92.182 mph	Cancelled; No Time
9	(England) Anthony Stock; 650 cc Suzuki	Cancelled; No Time	—— No Time	—— No Time	25' 49.23; 87.674 mph	25' 26.450; 88.983 mph	Cancelled; No Time
10	(Isle of Man) Steve Osborne; 650 cc Hyosung	Cancelled; No Time	—— No Time	—— No Time	27' 49.524; 81.358 mph	25' 47.181; 87.791 mph	Cancelled; No Time

==== 2012 Newcomers Race 'C' Practice Times & Leaderboard ====
- Plates; White Digits on Red Plates.

Rank	Rider	Sat 18 Aug	Mon 20 Aug	Tues 21 Aug	Wed 22 Aug	Thurs 23 Aug	Fri 24 Aug
1	(England) James Cowton; 400 cc Honda	Cancelled; No Time	—— No Time	23' 57.457; 94.490 mph	21' 51.396; 103.575 mph	22' 03.105; 102.660 mph	Cancelled; No Time
2	(England) Colin Croft; 400 cc Yamaha	Cancelled; No Time	—— No Time	25' 31.419; 88.690 mph	23' 42.17; 95.508 mph	23' 06.084; 97.994 mph	Cancelled; No Time
3	(England) Mick Hampson; 400 cc Yamaha	Cancelled; No Time	—— No Time	26' 58.322; 83.930 mph	24' 07.42; 93.842 mph	23' 43.156; 95.440 mph	Cancelled; No Time
4	(England) Ben Palmer; 400 cc Kawasaki	Cancelled; No Time	—— No Time	26' 30.020; 85.430 mph	24' 12.71; 93.500 mph	24' 07.132; 93.860 mph	Cancelled; No Time
5	(England) Rikki McGovern; 400 cc Honda	Cancelled; No Time	—— No Time	27' 09.246; 83.370 mph	—— No Time	24' 26.789; 92.602 mph	Cancelled; No Time
6	(Belgium) Renzo van der Donckt; 125 cc Honda	Cancelled; No Time	—— No Time	—— No Time	24' 32.984; 92.213 mph	24' 36.814; 91.970 mph	Cancelled; No Time
7	(England) Christopher Smith; 400 cc Kawasaki	Cancelled; No Time	—— No Time	31' 02.779; 72.920 mph	25' 48.62; 87.709 mph	24' 45.475; 91.437 mph	Cancelled; No Time
8	(Isle of Man) Glen Cooke; 400 cc Kawasaki	Cancelled; No Time	—— No Time	26' 46.893; 84.530 mph	25' 47.85; 87.753 mph	25' 18.961; 89.420 mph	Cancelled; No Time
9	(England) Adrian Bowman; 400 cc Honda	Cancelled; No Time	—— No Time	27' 06.038; 83.530 mph	25' 27.521; 88.921 mph	—— No Time	Cancelled; No Time

==== 2012 350 cc Junior Classic Practice Times and Leaderboard ====
- Plates; Black digits on White race plates.
- Class A Classic Machines 300 cc–350 cc

Rank	Rider	Sat 18 Aug	Mon 20 Aug	Tues 21 Aug	Wed 22 Aug	Thurs 23 Aug	Fri 24 Aug
1	(England) Chris Palmer; 349 cc Honda	Cancelled; No Time	—— No Time	24' 05.146; 93.990 mph	23' 33.37; 96.082 mph	22' 36.926; 100.100 mph	Cancelled; No Time
2	(Northern Ireland) Nigel Moore; 348 cc Honda	Cancelled; No Time	—— No Time	25' 48.427; 87.720 mph	—— No Time	23' 42.114; 95.511 mph	Cancelled; No Time
3	(Northern Ireland) Ryan Farquhar; 349 cc Honda	Cancelled; No Time	—— No Time	23' 51.781; 94.866 mph	—— No Time	—— No Time	Cancelled; No Time
4	(England) Roy Richardson; 348 cc Aermacchi	Cancelled; No Time	—— No Time	27' 10.316; 83.310 mph	—— No Time	24' 10.704; 93.629 mph	Cancelled; No Time
5	(England) Peter Richardson; 348 cc Honda	Cancelled; No Time	—— No Time	42' 46.200; 52.930 mph	24' 17.120; 93.217 mph	20' 58.111; 107.962 mph	Cancelled; No Time
6	(New Zealand) Chris Swallow; 350 cc Aermacchi	Cancelled; No Time	—— No Time	—— No Time	—— No Time	24' 17.855; 93.170 mph	Cancelled; No Time
7	(England) Bob Price; 350 cc Honda	Cancelled; No Time	—— No Time	—— No Time	24' 24.230; 92.764 mph	—— No Time	Cancelled; No Time
8	(Northern Ireland) Davy Morgan; 350 cc Honda	Cancelled; No Time	—— No Time	—— No Time	24' 42.65; 91.612 mph	24' 40.655; 91.735 mph	Cancelled; No Time
9	(England) Ken Davis; 350 cc Honda	Cancelled; No Time	—— No Time	—— No Time	24' 44.732; 91.483 mph	—— No Time	Cancelled; No Time
10	(England) David Matravers; 350 cc Honda	Cancelled; No Time	—— No Time	—— No Time	—— No Time	25' 01.300; 90.474 mph	Cancelled; No Time

==== 2012 250 cc Lightweight Classic Practice Times and Leaderboard ====
- Plates; Black digits on White race plates.
- Class A Classic Machines 175 cc–250 cc

Rank	Rider	Sat 18 Aug	Mon 20 Aug	Tues 21 Aug	Wed 22 Aug	Thurs 23 Aug	Fri 24 Aug
1	(England) Peter Symes; 249 cc Suzuki	Cancelled; No Time	—— No Time	32' 57.619; 68.680 mph	24' 28.299; 92.507 mph	—— No Time	Cancelled; No Time
2	(England) David Edwards; 246 cc Yamaha	Cancelled; No Time	—— No Time	25' 48.427; 87.720 mph	—— No Time	25' 26.158; 89.000 mph	Cancelled; No Time
3	(England) Alan Bud Jackson; 247 cc Suzuki	Cancelled; No Time	—— No Time	—— No Time	—— No Time	25' 33.084; 88.598 mph	Cancelled; No Time
4	(Scotland) Ewan Hamilton; 242 cc Suzuki	Cancelled; No Time	—— No Time	25' 33.950; 83.548 mph	—— No Time	—— No Time	Cancelled; No Time
5	(England) Maria Costello; 250 cc Suzuki	Cancelled; No Time	—— No Time	—— No Time	—— No Time	26' 17.669; 86.094 mph	Cancelled; No Time
6	(Isle of Man) Billy Cummins; 247 cc Suzuki	Cancelled; No Time	—— No Time	—— No Time	26' 18.569; 86.0450 mph	—— No Time	Cancelled; No Time
7	(England) Bob Millinship; 247 cc Ducati	Cancelled; No Time	—— No Time	26' 24.363; 85.7300 mph	—— No Time	—— No Time	Cancelled; No Time
8	(England) Ian Griffiths; 249 cc Aermacchi	Cancelled; No Time	—— No Time	29' 45.977; 76.050 mph	—— No Time	27' 11.696; 83.243 mph	Cancelled; No Time
9	(England) Geoff Bates; 249 cc Honda	Cancelled; No Time	—— No Time	30' 03.494; 75.310 mp	—— No Time	27' 13.101; 83.172 mph	Cancelled; No Time
10	(England) Peter Wakefield; 247 cc Suzuki	Cancelled; No Time	—— No Time	27' 14.264; 83.113 mph	—— No Time	—— No Time	Cancelled; No Time

==== 2012 500 cc Classic Practice Times and Leaderboard ====
- Plates; White digits on Black race plates.
- Classic Machines 351 cc–500 cc

Rank	Rider	Sat 18 Aug	Mon 20 Aug	Tues 21 Aug	Wed 22 Aug	Thurs 23 Aug	Fri 24 Aug
1	(Northern Ireland) Ryan Farquhar; 499 cc Paton	Cancelled; No Time	—— No Time	—— No Time	20' 34.507; 110.026 mph	—— No Time	Cancelled; No Time
2	(England) Oliver Linsdell; 500 cc Royal Enfield	Cancelled; No Time	—— No Time	24' 00.947; 94.260 mph	22' 09.13; 102.193 mph	21' 15.702; 106.473 mph	Cancelled; No Time
3	(England) Roy Richardson; 476 cc Aermacchi	Cancelled; No Time	—— No Time	—— No Time	—— No Time	21' 40.793; 104.419 mph	Cancelled; No Time
4	(England) Chris Palmer; 499 cc Matchless	Cancelled; No Time	—— No Time	24' 05.236; 93.980 mph	22' 21.89; 101.222 mph	21' 41.620; 104.353 mph	Cancelled; No Time
5	(England) Bob Owen; 500 cc Seeley	Cancelled; No Time	—— No Time	24' 20.446; 93.000 mph	23' 00.60; 98.383 mph	23' 00.317; 98.403 mph	Cancelled; No Time
6	(Wales) Meredydd Owen; 498 cc Mk II Seeley	Cancelled; No Time	—— No Time	—— No Time	23' 01.51; 98.318 mph	23' 19.977; 97.020 mph	Cancelled; No Time
7	(England) Bob Price; 500 cc Seeley	Cancelled; No Time	—— No Time	25' 17.461; 89.510 mph	—— No Time	23' 15.628; 97.324 mph	Cancelled; No Time
8	(France) Bruno Leroy; 499 cc Norton	Cancelled; No Time	—— No Time	—— No Time	—— No Time	23' 40.878; 95.594 mph	Cancelled; No Time
9	(England) Keith Dixon; 496 cc Seeley	Cancelled; No Time	—— No Time	25' 54.200; 87.390 mph	—— No Time	23' 42.212; 95.505 mph	Cancelled; No Time
10	(England) Bob Millinship; 476 cc Ducati	Cancelled; No Time	—— No Time	—— No Time	24' 37.16; 91.952 mph	23' 44.128; 95.376 mph	Cancelled; No Time

==== 2012 650 cc Super-Twins Practice Times & Leaderboard ====
- Plates; White numbers on Green race plates.

Rank	Rider	Sat 18 Aug	Mon 20 Aug	Tues 21 Aug	Wed 22 Aug	Thurs 23 Aug	Fri 24 Aug
1	(Northern Ireland) Nigel Moore; 650 cc Kawasaki	Cancelled; No Time	—— No Time	22' 38.074; 100.020 mph	21' 33.51; 105.008 mph	20' 42.002; 109.362 mph	Cancelled; No Time
2	(Northern Ireland) Brian Mateer; 249 cc Yamaha	Cancelled; No Time	—— No Time	22' 38.526; 99.980 mph	—— No Time	20' 57.692; 107.998 mph	Cancelled; No Time
3	(Northern Ireland) Trevor Fergusson; 650 cc Kawasaki	Cancelled; No Time	—— No Time	21' 55.031; 103.290 mph	21' 02.085; 107.622 mph	19' 40.109; 115.098 mph	Cancelled; No Time
4	(England) Mike Minns; 650 cc Kawasaki	Cancelled; No Time	—— No Time	23' 35.304; 95.970 mph	21' 05.188; 107.358 mph	19' 46.882; 114.441 mph	Cancelled; No Time
5	(Northern Ireland) Joe Phillips; 650 cc Yamasaki	Cancelled; No Time	—— No Time	23' 16.104; 97.2900 mph	21' 12.855; 106.711 mph	19' 53.162; 113.934 mph	Cancelled; No Time
6	(England) Alan Jackson; 650 cc Kawasaki	Cancelled; No Time	—— No Time	23' 25.277; 96.660 mph	21' 39.16; 104.550 mph	21' 22.713; 105.891 mph	Cancelled; No Time
7	(Republic of Ireland) Ciaran O'Callaghan; 650 cc Suzuki	Cancelled; No Time	—— No Time	—— No Time	—— No Time	21' 31.655; 105.158 mph	Cancelled; No Time
8	(England) Tom Snow; 250 cc Honda	Cancelled; No Time	—— No Time	24' 24.674; 92.740 mph	43' 05.49; 52.535 mph	21' 33.770; 104.986 mph	Cancelled; No Time
9	(Isle of Man) Andrew Dudgeon; 650 cc Kawasaki	Cancelled; No Time	—— No Time	24' 10.398; 93.650 mph	22' 07.71; 102.302 mph	21' 36.088; 104.798 mph	Cancelled; No Time
10	(England) Pete Bradshaw; 650 cc Kawasaki	Cancelled; No Time	—— No Time	24' 44.814; 91.480 mph	—— No Time	21' 41.632; 104.352 mph	Cancelled; No Time

==== 2012 Classic Superbike Practice Times & Leaderboard ====
- Plates; Black Digits on Orange Plates.

Rank	Rider	Sat 18 Aug	Mon 20 Aug	Tues 21 Aug	Wed 22 Aug	Thurs 23 Aug	Fri 24 Aug
1	(England) Russ Mountford; 998 cc Suzuki	Cancelled; No Time	—— No Time	22' 22.176; 101.200 mph	20' 07.9254; 112.447 mph	19' 57.845; 113.394 mph	Cancelled; No Time
2	(Isle of Man) Dan Kneen; 750 cc Suzuki	Cancelled; No Time	—— No Time	22' 41.336; 99.7800 mph	20' 30.77; 110.360 mph	20' 08.997; 112.348 mph	Cancelled; No Time
3	(Isle of Man) John Barton; 750 cc Suzuki	Cancelled; No Time	—— No Time	—— No Time	20' 58.01; 107.971 mph	20' 31.130; 110.330 mph	Cancelled; No Time
4	(England) Mick Godfrey; 997 cc Kawasaki	Cancelled; No Time	—— No Time	22' 55.913; 98.720 mph	20' 53.529; 108.356 mph	21' 03.100; 107.540 mph	Cancelled; No Time
5	(Northern Ireland) Ryan Farquhar; 1016 cc Suzuki	Cancelled; No Time	—— No Time	21' 02.809; 107.560 mph	—— No Time	—— No Time	Cancelled; No Time
6	(Northern Ireland) Davy Morgan; 749 cc Suzuki	Cancelled; No Time	—— No Time	24' 14.887; 93.360 mph	21' 14.215; 106.597 mph	—— No Time	Cancelled; No Time
7	(England) Alan Oversby; 750 cc Suzuki	Cancelled; No Time	—— No Time	—— No Time	21' 32.25; 105.110 mph	21' 24.578; 105.737 mph	Cancelled; No Time
8	(England) Maria Costello; 997 cc Suzuki	Cancelled; No Time	—— No Time	24' 04.597; 94.020 mph	21' 34.304; 104.943 mph	—— No Time	Cancelled; No Time
9	(England) Andy Lovett; 998 cc Honda	Cancelled; No Time	—— No Time	23' 35.678; 95.950 mph	21' 50.9374; 103.611 mph	22' 17.113; 101.580 mph	Cancelled; No Time
10	(England) Ken Davis; 750 cc Yamaha	Cancelled; No Time	—— No Time	—— No Time	42' 53.57; 52.778 mph	21' 51.608; 103.558 mph	Cancelled; No Time
11	(Northern Ireland) Michael Dunlop; 1000 cc Suzuki	Cancelled; No Time	—— No Time	22' 04.268; 102.570 mph	21' 51.662; 103.557 mph	—— No Time	Cancelled; No Time

==== 2012 Junior Post Classic Practice Times & Leaderboard ====
- Plates; Black Digits on Orange Plates.

Rank	Rider	Sat 18 Aug	Mon 20 Aug	Tues 21 Aug	Wed 22 Aug	Thurs 23 Aug	Fri 24 Aug
1	(England) Roy Richardson; 249 cc Yamaha	Cancelled; No Time	—— No Time	—— No Time	21' 14.964; 106.535 mph	—— No Time	Cancelled; No Time
2	(England) Philip McGurk; 250 cc Yamaha	Cancelled; No Time	—— No Time	24' 38.596; 91.860 mph	—— No Time	21' 31.613; 105.162 mph	Cancelled; No Time
3	(England) Peter Symes; 250 cc Honda	Cancelled; No Time	—— No Time	—— No Time	22' 58.01; 107.971 mph	20' 12.06; 101.968 mph	Cancelled; No Time
4	(Northern Ireland) Brian Mateer; 249 cc Yamaha	Cancelled; No Time	—— No Time	—— No Time	21' 55.626; 103.242 mph	—— No Time	Cancelled; No Time
5	(Scotland) Derek Glass; 600 cc Kawasaki	Cancelled; No Time	—— No Time	—— No Time	22' 38.22; 100.004 mph	22' 33.751; 100.335 mph	Cancelled; No Time
6	(Isle of Man) Dave Moffitt; 247 cc Armstrong	Cancelled; No Time	—— No Time	—— No Time	22' 38.254; 100.002 mph	22' 41.831; 99.740 mph	Cancelled; No Time
7	(England) Chris Palmer; 250 cc Yamaha	Cancelled; No Time	—— No Time	—— No Time	—— No Time	22' 44.636; 99.534 mph	Cancelled; No Time
8	(England) Henry Bell; 600 cc Suzuki	Cancelled; No Time	—— No Time	—— No Time	23' 27.876; 96.477 mph	—— No Time	Cancelled; No Time
9	(England) Karl Fox; 250 cc Honda	Cancelled; No Time	—— No Time	27' 40.789; 81.790 mph	23' 42.988; 95.453 mph	—— No Time	Cancelled; No Time
10	(Isle of Man) Dean Martin; 349 cc Yamaha	Cancelled; No Time	—— No Time	—— No Time	23' 44.642; 95.342 mph	—— No Time	Cancelled; No Time

=== Race results ===
==== Race 1a; Newcomers Race 'A' ====
Saturday 25 August 2012 Mountain Course 3 laps – 113.00 miles

- Class A
- 550 cc–750 cc Four-stroke Four-cylinder motor-cycles.
- 651 cc–1000 cc Four-stroke Twin-cylinder motor-cycles.
- 601 cc–675 cc Four-stroke Three-cylinder motor-cycles.
- 601 cc–1000 cc Rotary motorcycles.

Rank	Rider	Team	Speed	Time
1	(Czech Republic) Kamil Holan	600 cc Yamaha	106.683 mph	1:03.39.37
2	(England) Andrew Soar	750 cc Suzuki	106.304 mph	1:03.53.19
3	(Isle of Man) Dean Roberts	600 cc Honda	105.060 mph	1:04.38.60
4	(Netherlands) Peter Heijmans	599 cc Honda	104.423 mph	1:05.02.25
5	(Denmark) Thilo Haefele	600 cc Yamaha	102.739 mph	1:06.06.21
6	(England) Oliver Dupuy	600 cc Yamaha	102.218 mph	1:06.26.43
7	(England) Adrian Harrison	600 cc Yamaha	101.895 mph	1:06.39.07
8	(England) Jamie Hodson	600 cc Yamaha	101.453 mph	1:06.56.47
9	(Netherlands) Michael Hofman	600 cc Kawasaki	100.309 mph	1:07.42.30
10	(France) Steve Cervellin	600 cc Honda	100.076 mph	1:07.51.74

Fastest Lap: John Simpson – 109.808 mph (20' 36.96)

==== Race 1b; Newcomers Race 'B' ====
Saturday 25 August 2012 Mountain Course 3 laps – 113.00 miles (182.16 km)

- Class B
- 251 cc–450 cc Two-stroke Two-cylinder motor-cycles.
- Up to 650 cc Four-stroke Twin-cylinder motor-cycles.

Rank	Rider	Team	Speed	Time
1	(Isle of Man) Andrew Dudgeon	650 cc Kawasaki	102.617 mph	1:06.10.94
2	(England) Gary Gittins	650 cc Suzuki	101.105 mph	1:07.10.32
3	(England) Colin Stephenson	650 cc Suzuki	99.480 mph	1:08.16.16
4	(England) Rob Hodson	650 cc Kawasaki	97.671 mph	1:09.32.02
5	(England) Rad Hughes	650 cc Kawasaki	96.702 mph	1:10.13.80
6	(England) Gabrielle Burne	650 cc Suzuki	91.904 mph	1:13.53.81
7	(Northern Ireland) Mark Shields	650 cc Suzuki	88.413 mph	1:16.48.87
8	(England) Anthony Stock	650 cc Suzuki	84.522 mph	1:20.21.05
9	(England) Robert Miles	650 cc Suzuki	81.112 mph	1:23.43.75

Fastest Lap: Andrew Dudgeon – 103.580 mph (21' 51.33)

==== Race 1c; Newcomers Race 'C' ====
Saturday 25 August 2012 Mountain Course 3 laps – 113.00 miles (182.16 km)

- Class B
- Up to 125 cc Two-stroke Single-cylinder motor-cycles 6 gears maximum.
- 201 cc–400 cc Four-stroke Four-cylinder motor-cycles.

Rank	Rider	Team	Speed	Time
1	(England) James Cowton	400 cc Honda	98.369 mph	1:09.02.40
2	(Belgium) Renzo van der Donckt	125 cc Honda	90.416 mph	1:15.06.789
3	(England) Ben Palmer	400 cc Kawasaki	89.958 mph	1:15.29.70
4	(England) Christopher Smith	400 cc Kawasaki	86.667 mph	1:18.21.74
5	(Isle of Man) Glen Cooke	400 cc Kawasaki	85.110 mph	1:19.47.71
6	(England) Adrian Bowman	400 cc Honda	84.362 mph	1:20.30.20

Fastest Lap: James Cowton – 99.523 mph (22' 44.79)

==== Race 2a; 350 cc Junior Classic Race ====
Tuesday 28 August 2012 Mountain Course 3 laps – 113.00 miles (Reduced Race Distance)

- For motor-cycles exceeding 300 cc and not exceeding 351 cc

Rank	Rider	Team	Speed	Time
1	(England) Chris Palmer	349 cc Honda	98.818 mph	1:08.43.56
2	(New Zealand) Chris Swallow	350 cc Aermacchi	97.996 mph	1:09.18.17
3	(Northern Ireland) Nigel Moore	348 cc Honda	96.434 mph	1:10.25.52
4	(England) Alan Oversby	349 cc AJS	95.964 mph	1:10.46.66
5	(England) Peter Richardson	348 cc Honda	93.875 mph	1:12.20.73
6	(England) Alec Whitwell	350 cc Honda	92.211 mph	1:13.39.05
7	(England) Ken Davis	350 cc Honda	91.522 mph	1:14.12.33
8	(Isle of Man) Bob Price	350 cc Honda	91.469 mph	1:14.14.88
9	(Wales) Meredydd Owen	348 cc Seeley	91.255 mph	1:14.25.35
10	(Isle of Man) Dean Martin	350 cc Honda	90.125 mph	1:15.21.31

Fastest Lap; Roy Richardson 102.327 mph (22 minutes 07.40 secs)

==== Race 2b; 250 cc Lightweight Classic Race ====
Tuesday 28 August 2012 Mountain Course 3 laps – 113.00 miles (Reduced Race Distance)

- For motor-cycles exceeding 175 cc and not exceeding 250 cc

Rank	Rider	Team	Speed	Time
1	(England) Peter Symes	249 cc Suzuki	91.394 mph	1:14.18.55
2	(England) Dave Edwards	246 cc Yamaha	86.680 mph	1:18.21.04
3	(England) Geoff Bates	249 cc Honda	83.753 mph	1:21.05.33
4	(Isle of Man) David Clarke	247 cc Suzuki	77.155 mph	1:28.01.36
5	(England) Andy Wilson	247 cc Suzuki	70.647 mph	1:36.07.930

Fastest Lap; Peter Symes 93.535 mph (24 minutes 12.16 secs)

==== Race 3; Junior Manx Grand Prix ====
Tuesday 28 August 2012 Mountain Course 4 laps – 150.92 miles (242.80 km)

- 201 cc–250 cc Two-stroke Two-cylinder motor-cycles.
- 550 cc–600 cc Four-stroke Four-cylinder motor-cycles.
- 601 cc–675 cc Four-stroke Three-cylinder motor-cycles.
- 651 cc–750 cc Four-stroke Two-cylinder motor-cycles.

Rank	Rider	Team	Speed	Time
1	(Republic of Ireland) Wayne Kirwan	600 cc Yamaha	113.986 mph	1:19.26.46
2	(England) Mike Minns	600 cc Yamaha	113.335 mph	1:19.53.87
3	(Northern Ireland) Stephen McKnight	600 cc Yamaha	113.072 mph	1:20.04.99
4	(England) James Cowton	600 cc Honda	111.986 mph	1:20.51.62
5	(England) Stephen Harper	675 cc Triumph	111.651 mph	1:21.06.18
6	(Isle of Man) Jonathan Woodward	675 cc Triumph	111.633 mph	1:21.06.97
7	(Republic of Ireland) Michael Sweeney	600 cc Yamaha	111.552 mph	1:21.10.48
8	(England) Alan Jackson	600 cc Moriwaki	111.494 mph	1:21.13.01
9	(England) Michael Moulai	600 cc Suzuki	111.131 mph	1:21.28.93
10	(England) Ross Johnson	600 cc Honda	110.870 mph	1:21.40.45

Fastest Lap; Wayne Kirwan 115.579 mph (19 minutes 35.20 secs)

==== Race 4; 500 cc Classic Race ====
Wednesday 29 August 2012 Mountain Course 4 laps – 150.92 miles (242.80 km)

- For classic motor-cycles exceeding 351 cc and not exceeding 500 cc

Rank	Rider	Team	Speed	Time
1	(Northern Ireland) Ryan Farquhar	499 cc Paton	103.866 mph	1:27.10.91
2	(New Zealand) Chris Swallow	500 cc Norton	98.103 mph	1:32.18.17
3	(England) Chris Palmer	499 cc Matchless	97.571 mph	1:32.48.37
4	(Scotland) Wattie Brown	498 cc Petty Norton	96.825 mph	1:33.31.26
5	(France) Bruno Leroy	499 cc Petty Manx Norton	93.700 mph	1:36.38.43
6	(England) Peter Richardson	348 cc Honda	92.032 mph	1:38.23.54
7	(England) Keith Dixon	496 cc Seeley G50	91.354 mph	1:33.07.32
8	(Wales) Hefyn Owen	498 cc Matchless	91.139 mph	1:39.21.37
9	(England) Tony Mason	350 cc Honda	89.938 mph	1:40.40.99
10	(Isle of Man) Dean Martin	498 cc Honda	89.508 mph	1:41.09.97

Fastest Lap: Ryan Farquhar – 106.012 mph (21 minutes 21.25 secs)

==== Race 4b; Formula Classic Race ====
Wednesday 29 August 2012 Mountain Course 4 laps – 150.92 miles (242.80 km)

- For motor-cycles exceeding 501 cc and not exceeding 750 cc

Rank	Rider	Team	Speed	Time
1	(Isle of Man) Dave Madsen-Mygdal	750 cc Triumph	99.111 mph	1:31.21.84
2	(England) Mark Parrett	850 cc BSA	97.770 mph	1:32.37.04
3	(England) Adam Ward	750 cc Rickman Metisse	82.428 mph	1:49.51.32
4	(England) Geoff Bates	750 cc Honda	79.792 mph	1:53.29.09

Fastest Lap; Dave Madsen-Mygdal 103.606 mph (21 minutes 51.00 secs)

==== Race 5; Super-Twin Race ====
Wednesday 29 August 2012 Mountain Course 4 laps – 150.92 miles (242.80 km)

- For motor-cycles exceeding 201 cc and not exceeding 650 cc Two-stroke Twin-cylinder motor-cycles

Rank	Rider	Team	Speed	Time
1	(Northern Ireland) Nigel Moore	650 cc Kawasaki	110.214 mph	1:22.09.61
2	(Republic of Ireland) Michael Sweeney	650 cc Kawasaki	107.784 mph	1:24.00.73
3	(Northern Ireland) Brian Mateer	249 cc Honda	107.193 mph	1:24.28.55
4	(Scotland) Rab Davie	650 cc Kawasaki	106.809 mph	1:24.46.75
5	(England) Mike Minns	650 cc Kawasaki	105.198 mph	1:26.04.68
6	(Isle of Man) Andrew Dudgeon	650 cc Kawasaki	103.547 mph	1:26.10.45
7	(England) Tom Snow	250 cc Honda	104.692 mph	1:26.29.60
8	(England) John Leigh-Pemberton	650 cc Suzuki	104.441 mph	1:26.42.12
9	(England) Scott Campbell	650 cc Suzuki	103.930 mph	1:27.07.65
10	(England) Alan Jackson	650 cc Kawasaki	103.652 mph	1:27.21.71

Fastest Lap: Nigel Moore – 111.746 mph (20 minutes 15.50 secs)

==== Race 5b; Lightweight Race ====
Wednesday 29 August 2012 Mountain Course 4 laps – 150.92 miles (242.80 km)

- Two-stroke motorcycles up to 125 cc, 6 gears maximum.
- Four-stroke motorcycles 251 cc–401 cc

Rank	Rider	Team	Speed	Time
1	(England) Ross Johnson	400 cc Kawasaki	103.196 mph	1:27.44.87
2	(England) Tim Sayers	400 cc Yamaha	103.152 mph	1:27.47.09
3	(Isle of Man) Adam Jones	400 cc Kawasaki	100.920 mph	1:29.43.59
4	(England) Stephen Harper	400 cc Honda	100.277 mph	1:30.18.13
5	(England) David Yeomans	400 cc Kawasaki	100.138 mph	1:30.25.66
6	(England) Gavin Luptin	400 cc Honda	100.015 mph	1:30.32.32
7	(Isle of Man) Dave Corlett	400 cc Kawasaki	98.694 mph	1:31.44.99
8	(England) Bob Farrington	400 cc Kawasaki	98.513 mph	1:31.55.13
9	(England) Anthony Redmond	399 cc Honda	97.856 mph	1:32.32.16
10	(England) Doug Snow	125 cc Honda	97.112 mph	1:33.12.89

Fastest Lap: Tim Sayers – 105.655 mph (21 minutes 25.58 secs)

==== Race 6a; Classic Superbike Race ====
Friday 31 August 2012 Mountain Course 4 laps – 150.92 miles (242.80 km)

- Class A
- Classic Machines 601 cc–1050 cc Four-stroke motorcycles.
- 351 cc–750 cc Two-stroke motorcycles.

Rank	Rider	Team	Speed	Time
1	(Northern Ireland) Michael Dunlop	1000 cc Suzuki	112.545 mph	1:20.27.51
2	(England) Mick Godfrey	997 cc Kawasaki	108.872 mph	1:23.10.37
3	(England) Alan Oversby	750 cc Suzuki	107.000 mph	1:24.37.70
4	(Northern Ireland) Davy Morgan	749 cc Suzuki	105.545 mph	1:25.47.70
5	(England) Maria Costello	997 cc Suzuki	101.184 mph	1:28.37.01
6	(England) Paul Wilson	750 cc Suzuki	101.427 mph	1:29.16.69
7	(England) Andy Lovett	998 cc Honda	101.277 mph	1:29.24.62
8	(Isle of Man) Chris McGahan	748 cc Triumph	101.118 mph	1:29.33.04
9	(England) Neil Vicars	750 cc Suzuki	100.189 mph	1:30.22.86
10	(England) Gavin Luptin	757 cc Triumph	99.014 mph	1:31.27.20

Fastest Lap; Michael Dunlop 115.560 mph (19 minutes 35.39 secs)

==== Race 6b; Junior Post Classic Race ====
Friday 31 August 2012 Mountain Course 4 laps – 150.92 miles (242.80 km)

- Class B
- 126 cc–250 cc Two-stroke Cylinder Grand Prix/Factory Standard motor-cycles/steel-frame or period aluminium.
- 251 cc–350 cc Two-stroke Cylinder standard motor-cycles/steel-frame.
- Up to 600 cc Four-stroke Cylinder motorcycles.
- For motorcycles exceeding 175 cc and not exceeding 250 cc

Rank	Rider	Team	Speed	Time
1	(England) Roy Richardson	249 cc Yamaha	108.823 mph	1:24.41.55
2	(England) Philip McGurk	249 cc Yamaha	105.059 mph	1:26.11.49
3	(Northern Ireland) Brian Mateer	249 cc Yamaha	104.128 mph	1:26.57.73
4	(Scotland) Derek Glass	600 cc Kawasaki	101.340 mph	1:29.21.28
5	(Isle of Man) Dave Moffitt	247 cc Armstrong	97.019 mph	1:33.20.08
6	(Isle of Man) Dean Martin	349 cc Yamaha	95.509 mph	1:34.48.62
7	(England) Karl Fox	250 cc Honda	94.877 mph	1:35.26.48
8	(England) Neil Chadwick	250 cc Yamaha	94.518 mph	1:35.48.27
9	(England) Tom Jackson	250 cc Honda	92.014 mph	1:38.24.65
10	(England) Marek Wieckowski	350 cc Yamaha	89.424 mph	1:41.15.69

Fastest Lap; Chris Palmer 112.644 mph (20 minutes 05.82 secs)

==== Race 7; Senior Manx Grand Prix ====
Friday 31 August 2012 Mountain Course 4 laps – 150.92 miles (242.80 km)

- Four-stroke Four-cylinder motorcycles exceeding 550 cc and not exceeding 750 cc.
- Four-stroke Twin-cylinder motorcycles exceeding 651 cc and not exceeding 1000 cc.
- Four-stroke Three-cylinder motorcycles exceeding 601 cc and not exceeding 675 cc.

Rank	Rider	Team	Speed	Time
1	(Northern Ireland) John Simpson	675 cc Triumph	106.526 mph	1:25.00.25
2	(England) Andrew Soar	750 cc Suzuki	106.484 mph	1:25.02.29
3	(Republic of Ireland) Wayne Kirwan	600 cc Yamaha	106.404 mph	1:25.06.13
4	(England) Ross Johnson	600 cc Yamaha	105.492 mph	1:25.50.25
5	(England) Andy Lovett	600 cc Suzuki	104.502 mph	1:26.30.07
6	(Isle of Man) Paul Smyth	750 cc Suzuki	104.464 mph	1:26.40.95
7	(England) Stephen Harper	675 cc Triumph	104.383 mph	1:26.44.99
8	(Isle of Man) Carl Roberts	600 cc Suzuki	103.889 mph	1:27.09.73
9	(Scotland) Andy Lawson	600 cc Kawasaki	103.629 mph	1:27.22.87
10	(England) Alan Jackson	600 cc Moriwaki	103.572 mph	1:27.25.74

Fastest Lap; Wayne Kirwan 117.189 mph (19 minutes 19.05 secs).

== Gallery ==
Manx Grand Prix 2012
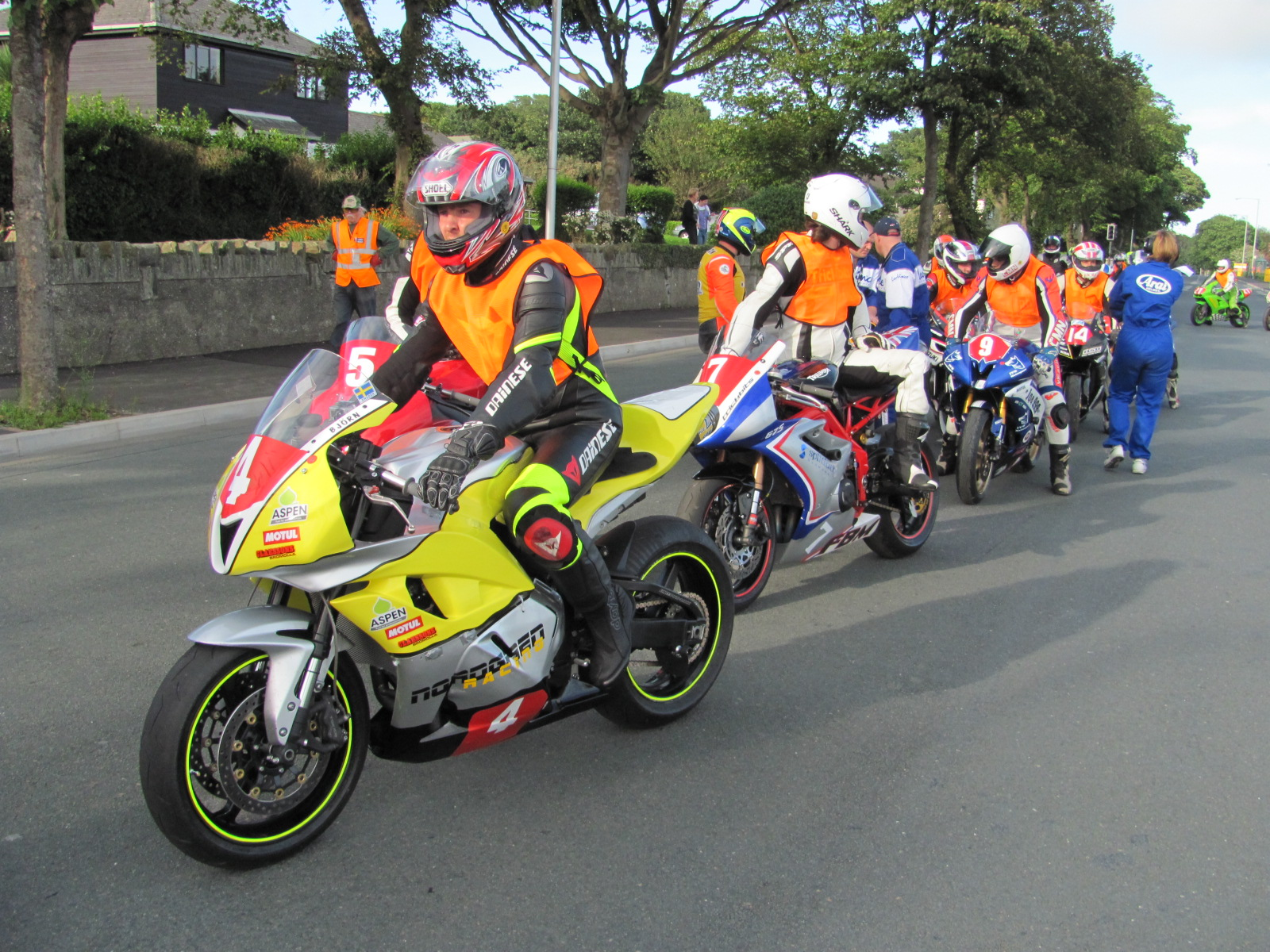
Competitors line-up to start the newcomers' speed controlled lap TT Grandstand 18 August 2012

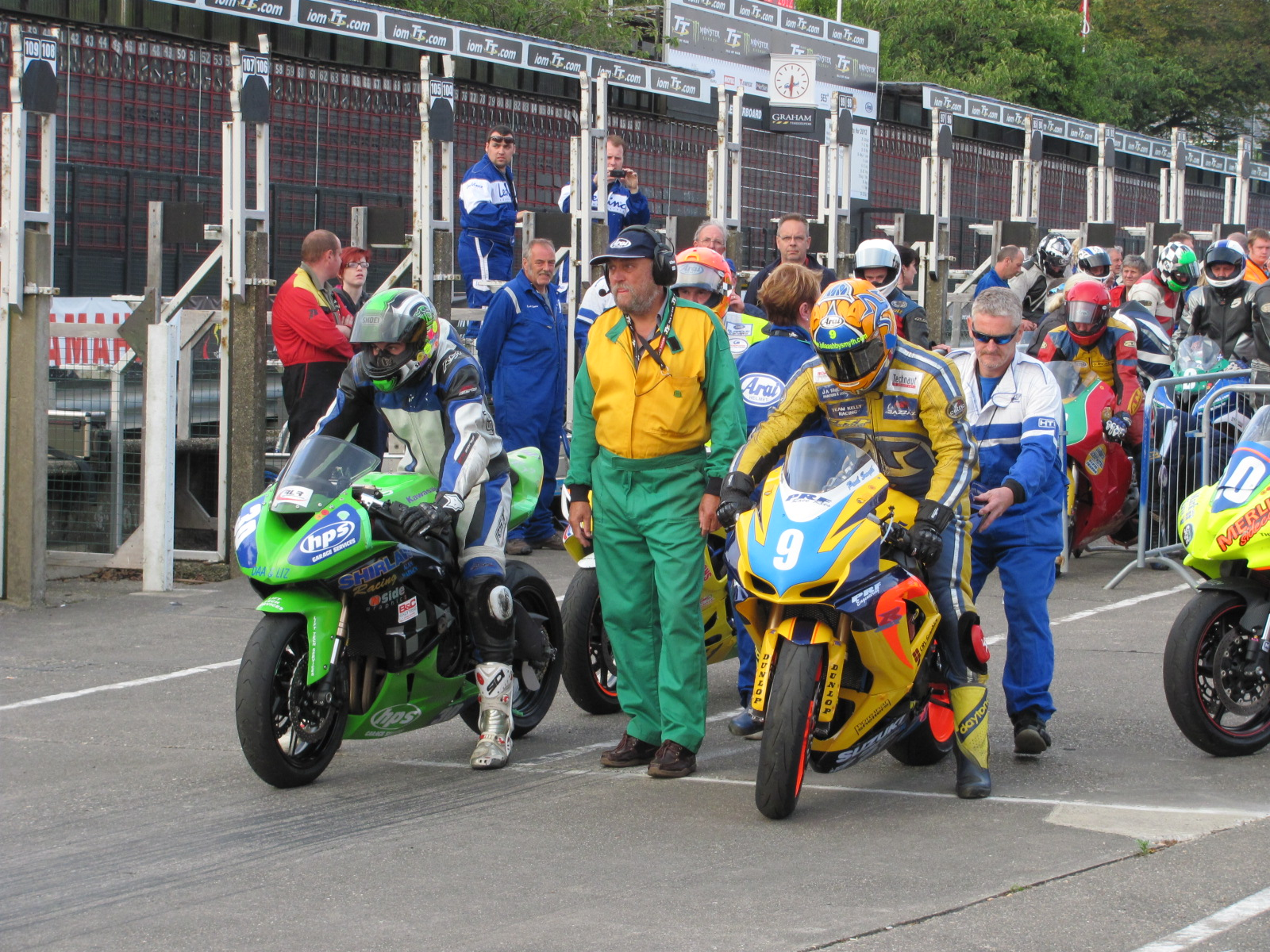
Competitors line-up in the pit-lane for the first practice session TT Grandstand Monday 20 August 2012

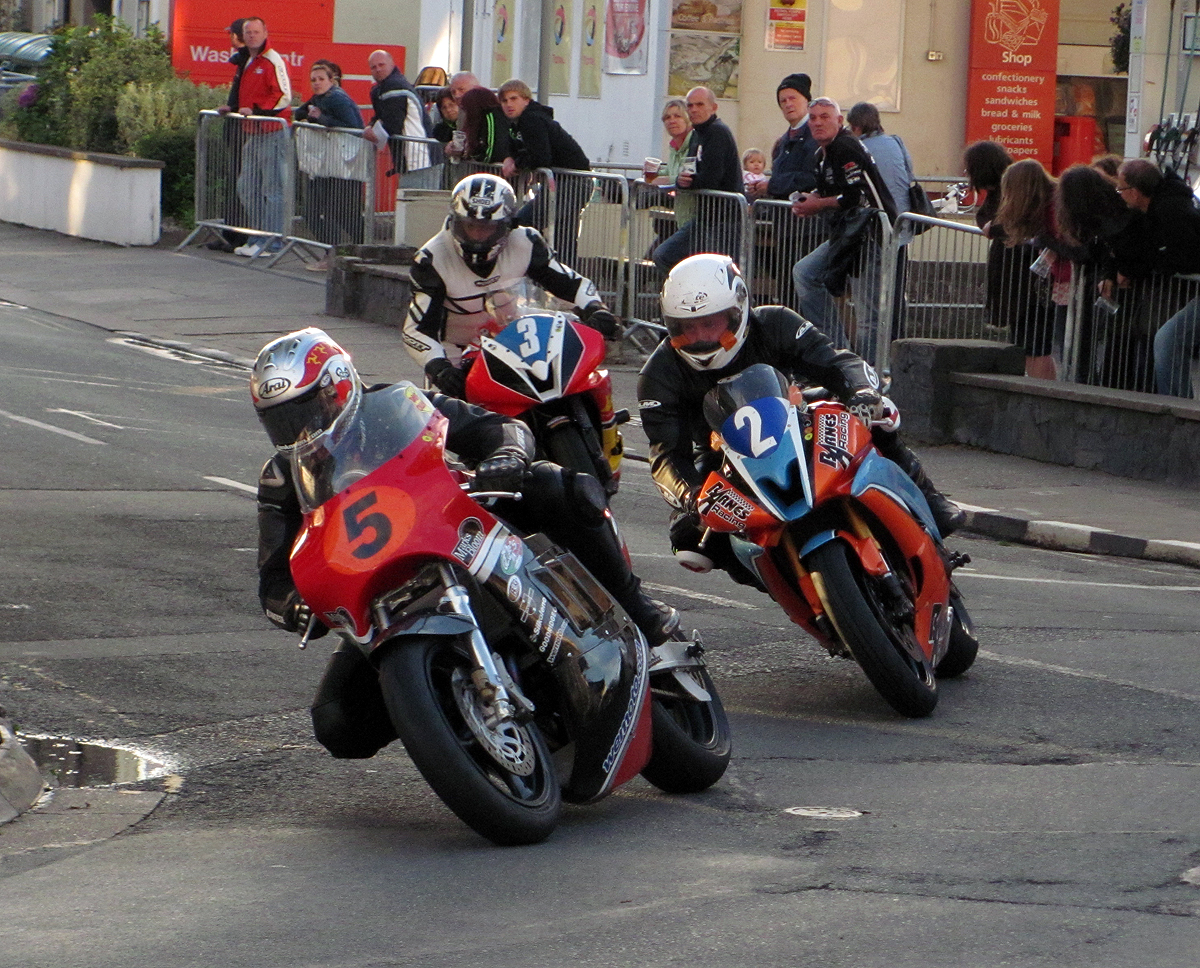
Dan Kneen (5) 750 cc Suzuki, Jamie Coward (2) 600 cc Suzuki & Wayne Kirwan (3) 600 cc Yamaha Parliament Square, Ramsey Tuesday 21 August 2012

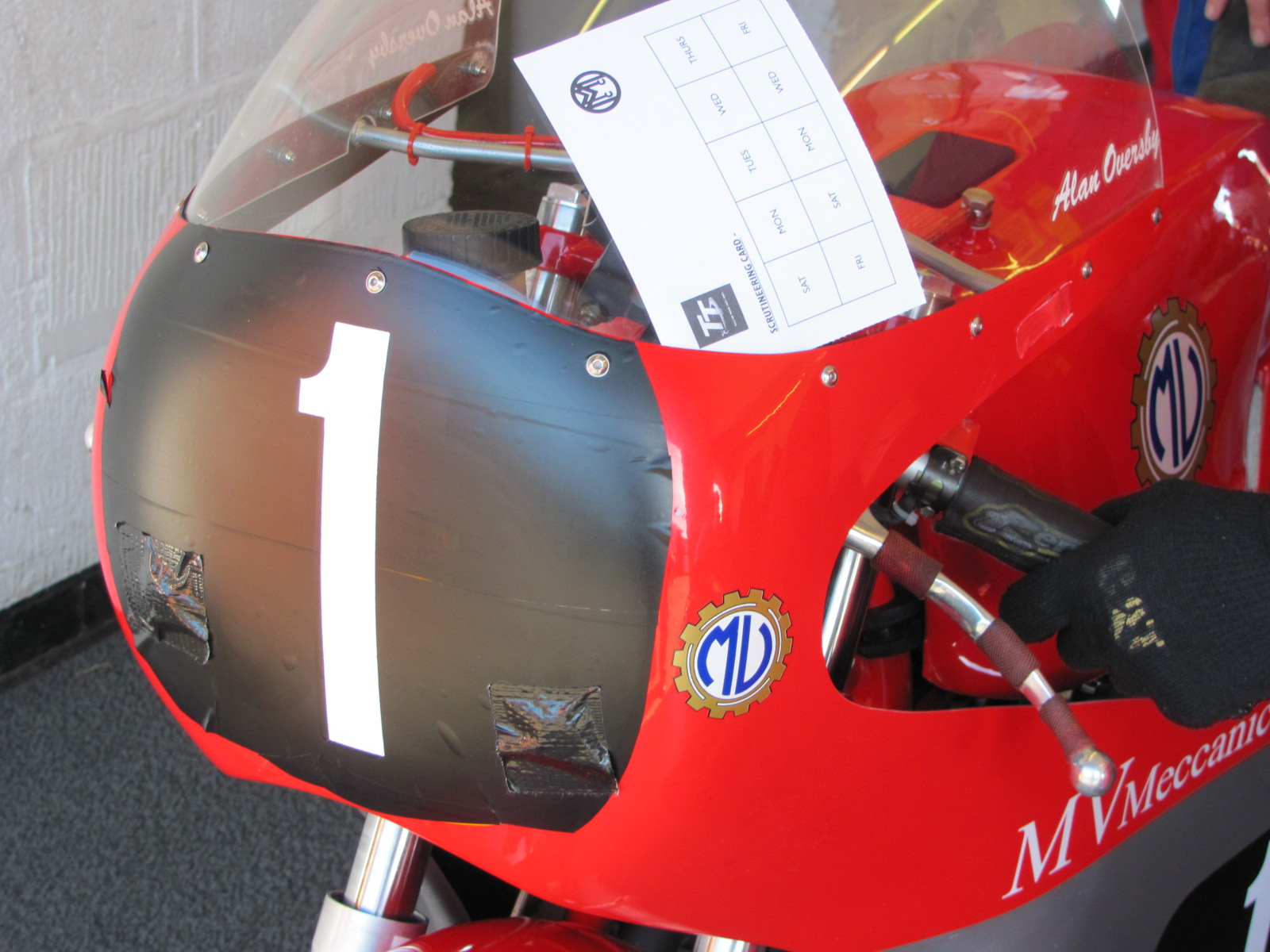
MV Agusta Alan Oversby (1) Scrutineering TT Grandstand Saturday 18 August 2012

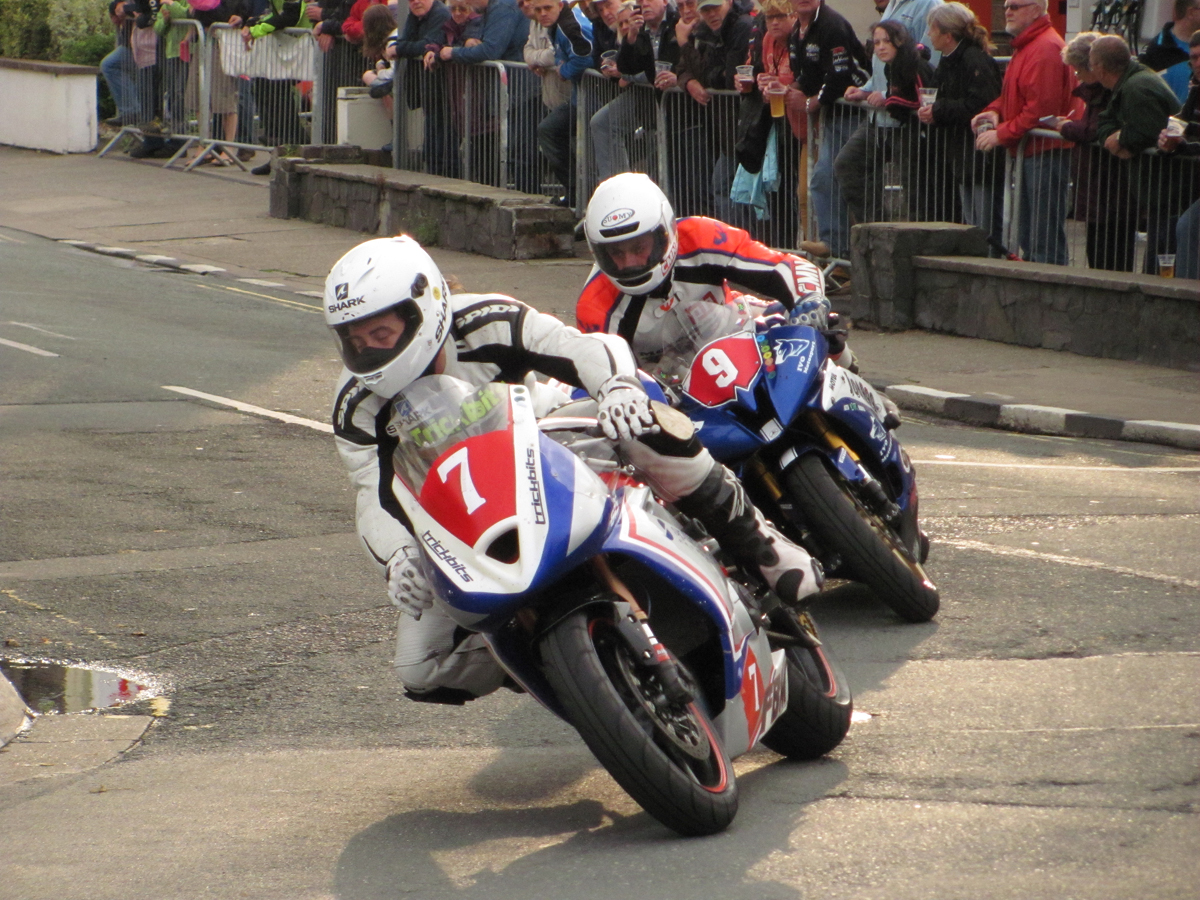
Newcomers Race 'A' John Simpson (7) 675 cc Triumph & Kamil Holan (9) 600 cc Yamaha – Lap 1 Parliament Square, Ramsey Saturday 25 August 2012

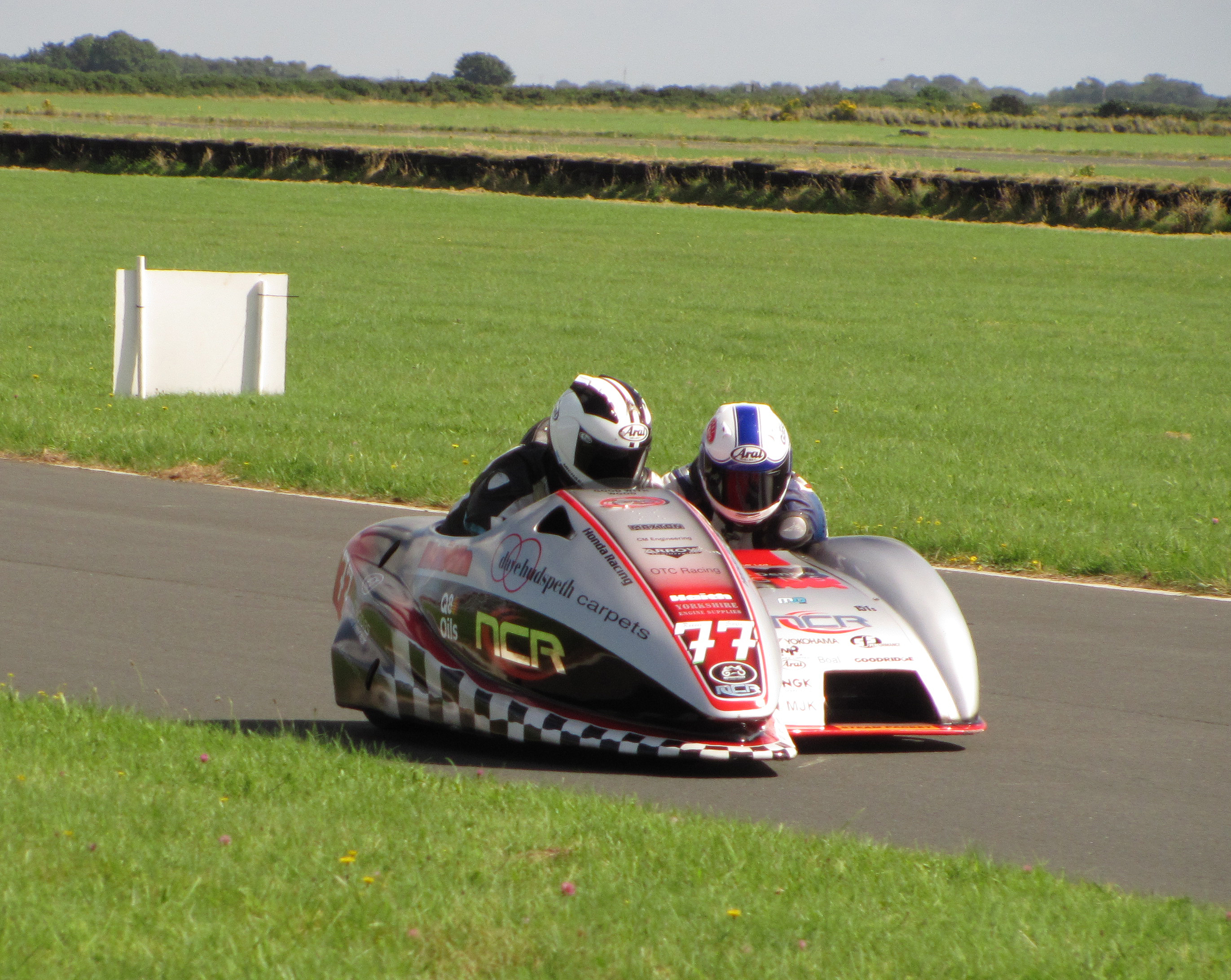
VMCC Festival of Jurby/Manx Grand Prix 2012 Demonstration lap by Isle of Man TT & Manx Grand Prix winners Michael Dunlop and Dan Sayle Sunday 26 August 2012

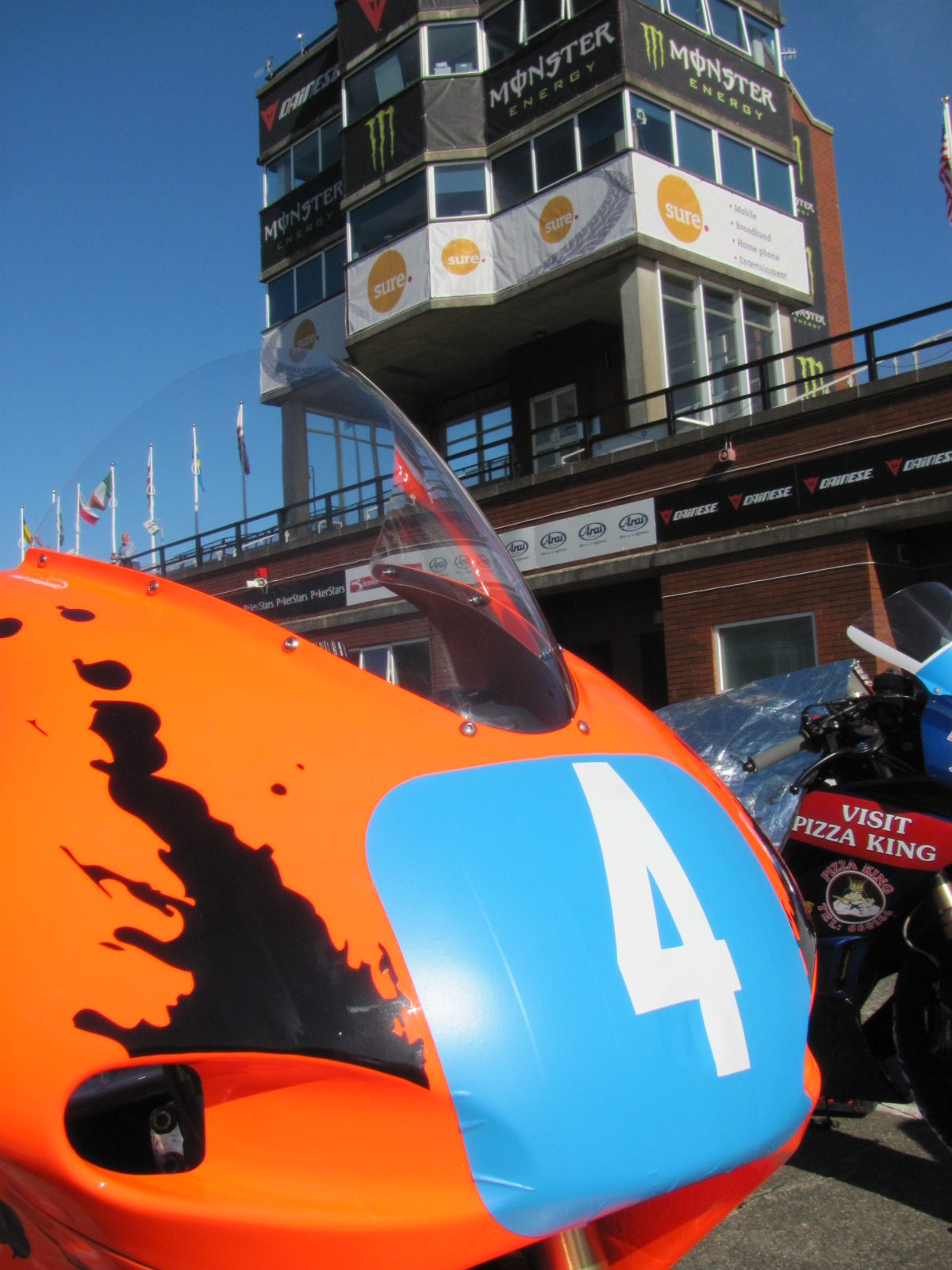
Parc Fermé – Competitors and machines wait for the start of the first evening practice session. TT Grandstand Saturday 18 August 2012

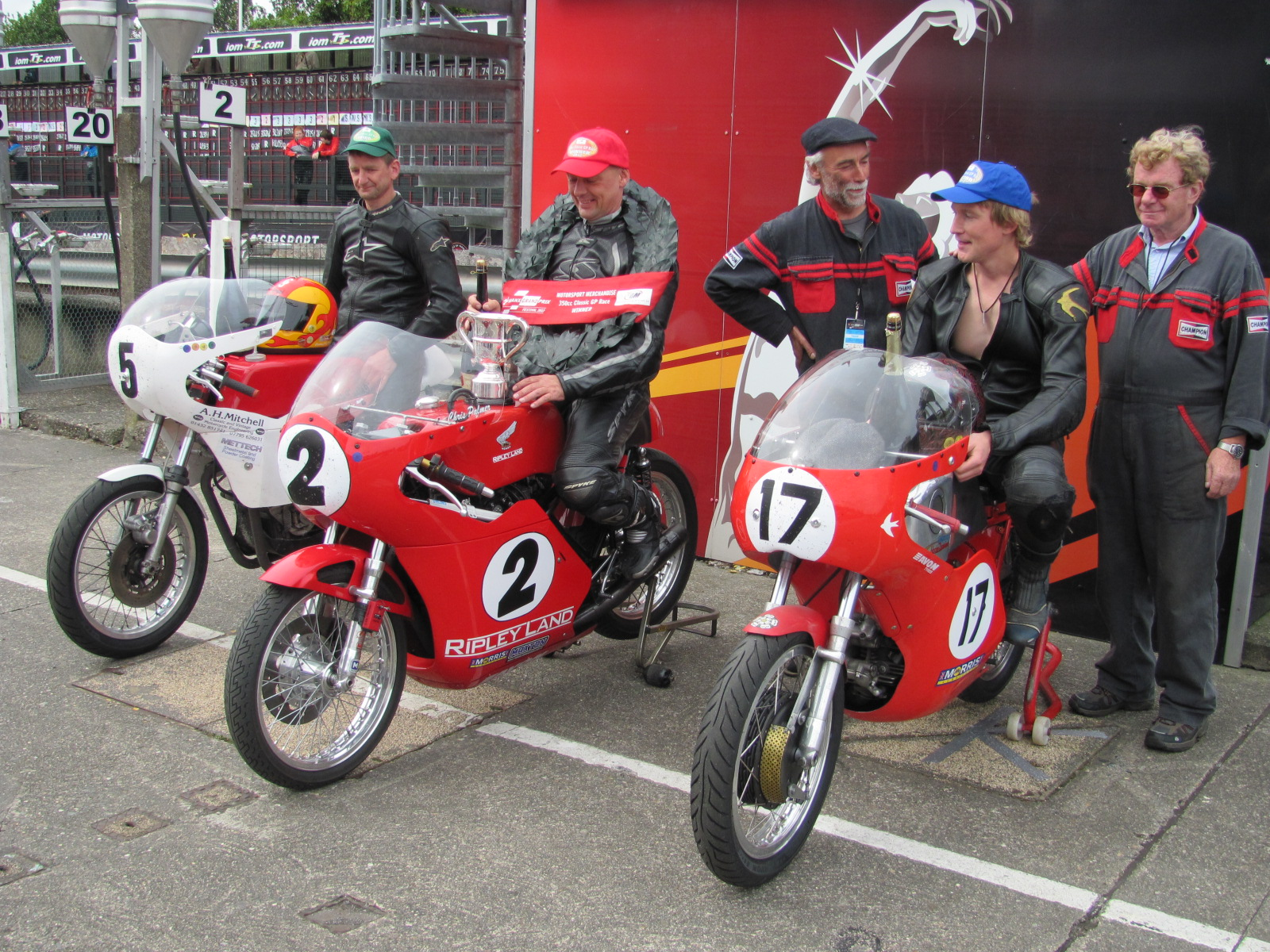
Winners Presentation 350 cc Junior Classic Race – Ian Moore (9), Chris Palmer (2) & Chris Swallow (17) TT Grandstand Tuesday 28 August 2012

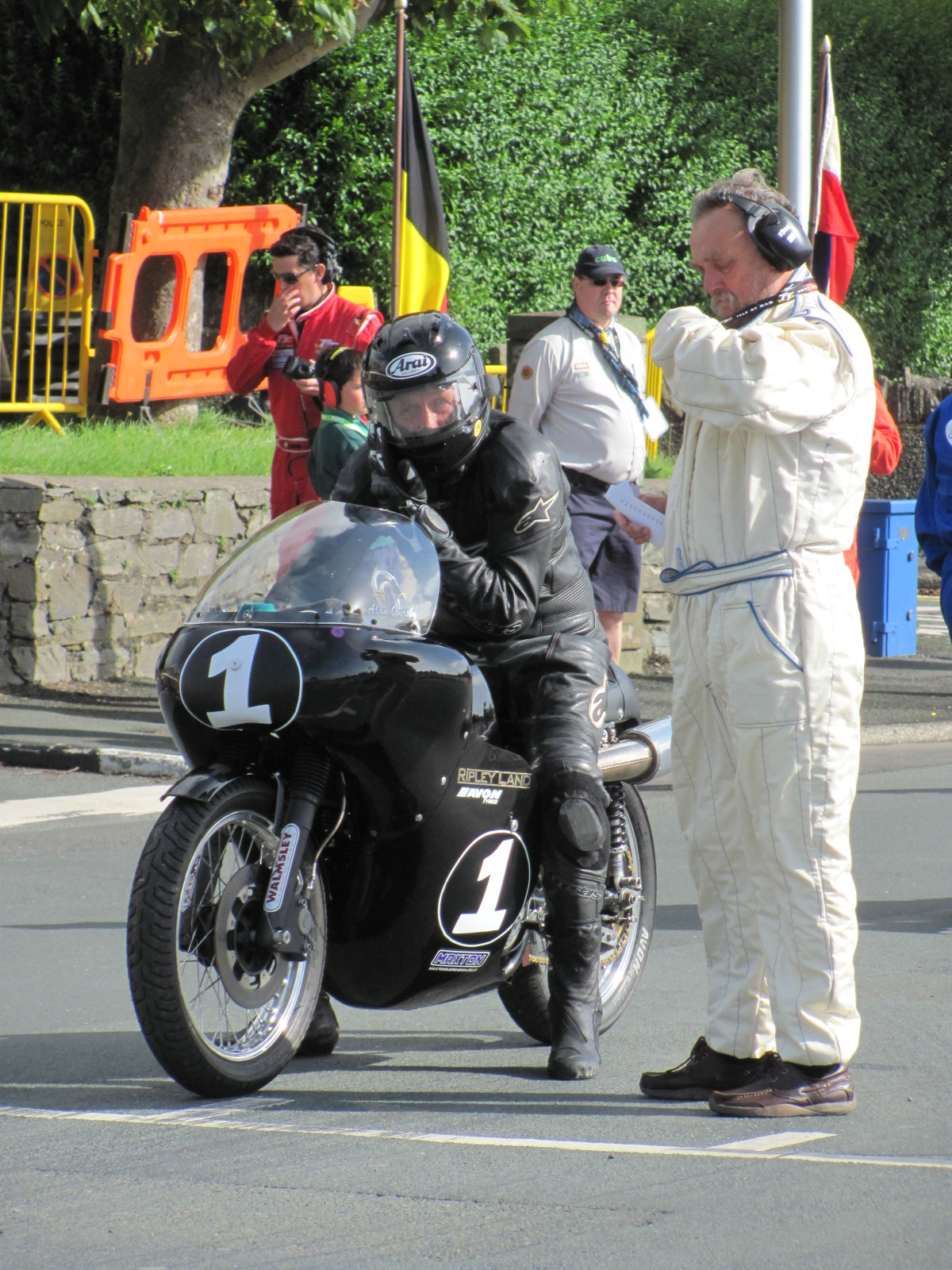
Start of 500 cc Classic Senior Manx Grand Prix – Alan Oversby (1) 500 cc Matchless TT Grandstand Wednesday 29 August 2012

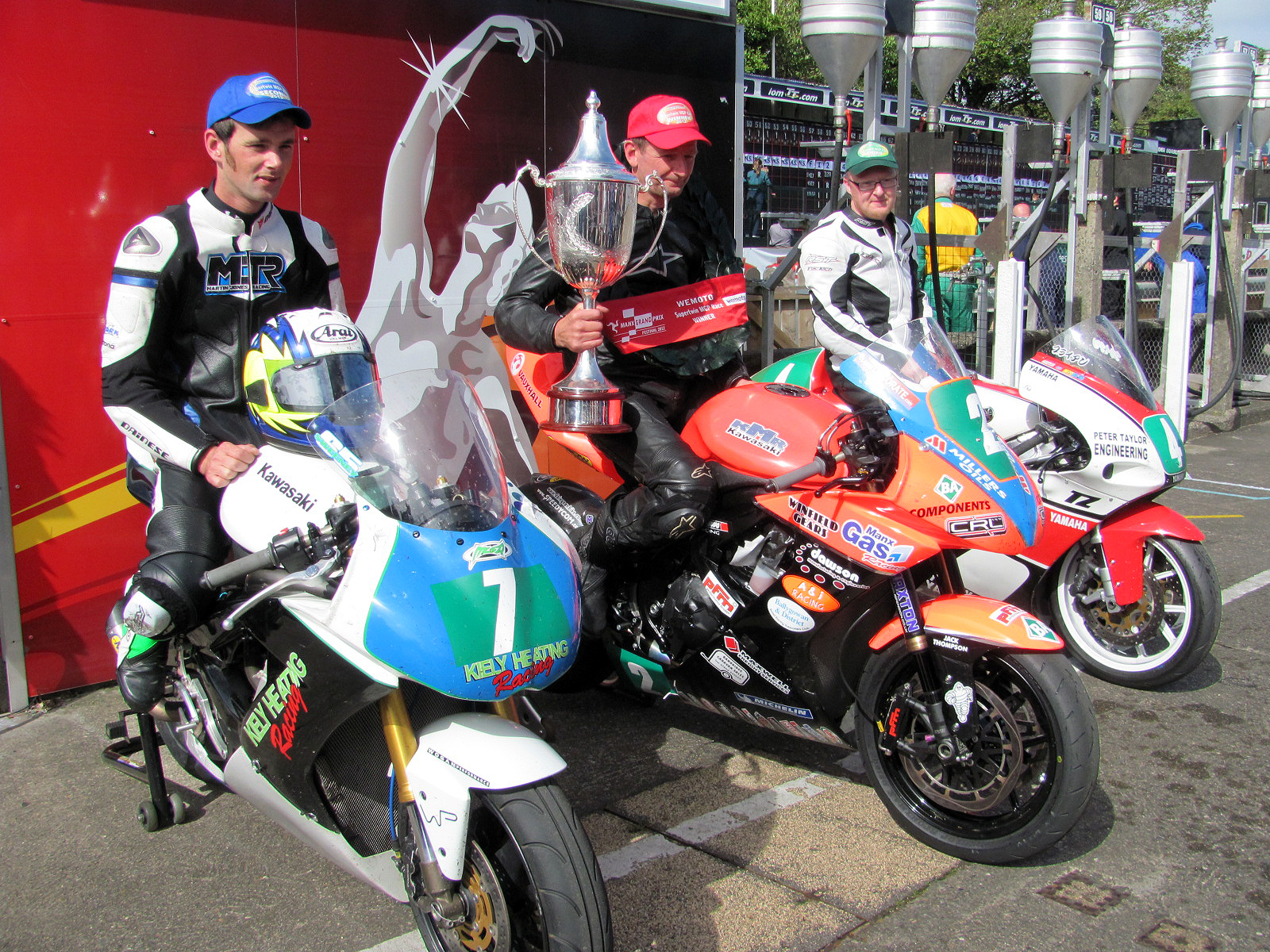
Winners Presentation 2012 Super-Twin Manx Grand Prix – Nigel Moore (2), Brian Mateer (4) & Michael Sweeney (7) TT Grandstand Wednesday 29 August 2012

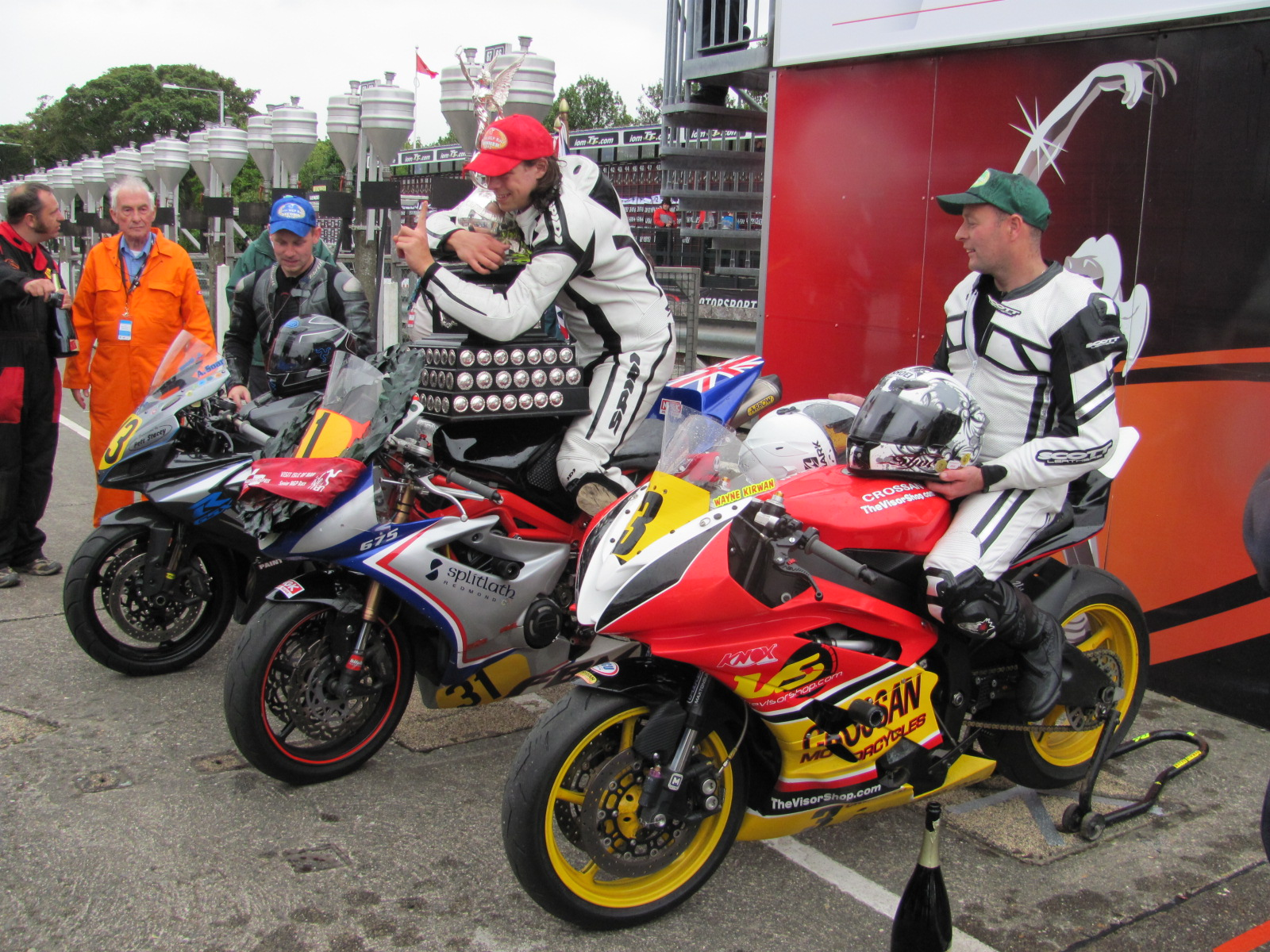
Winners Presentation 2012 Senior Manx Grand Prix – Andrew Soar (43) 750 cc Suzuki, John Simpson (31) 675 cc Triumph & Wayne Kirwan (4) 600 cc Yamaha TT Grandstand Friday 31 August 2012
