= Ryan Farquhar =

Northern Irish motorcycle racer

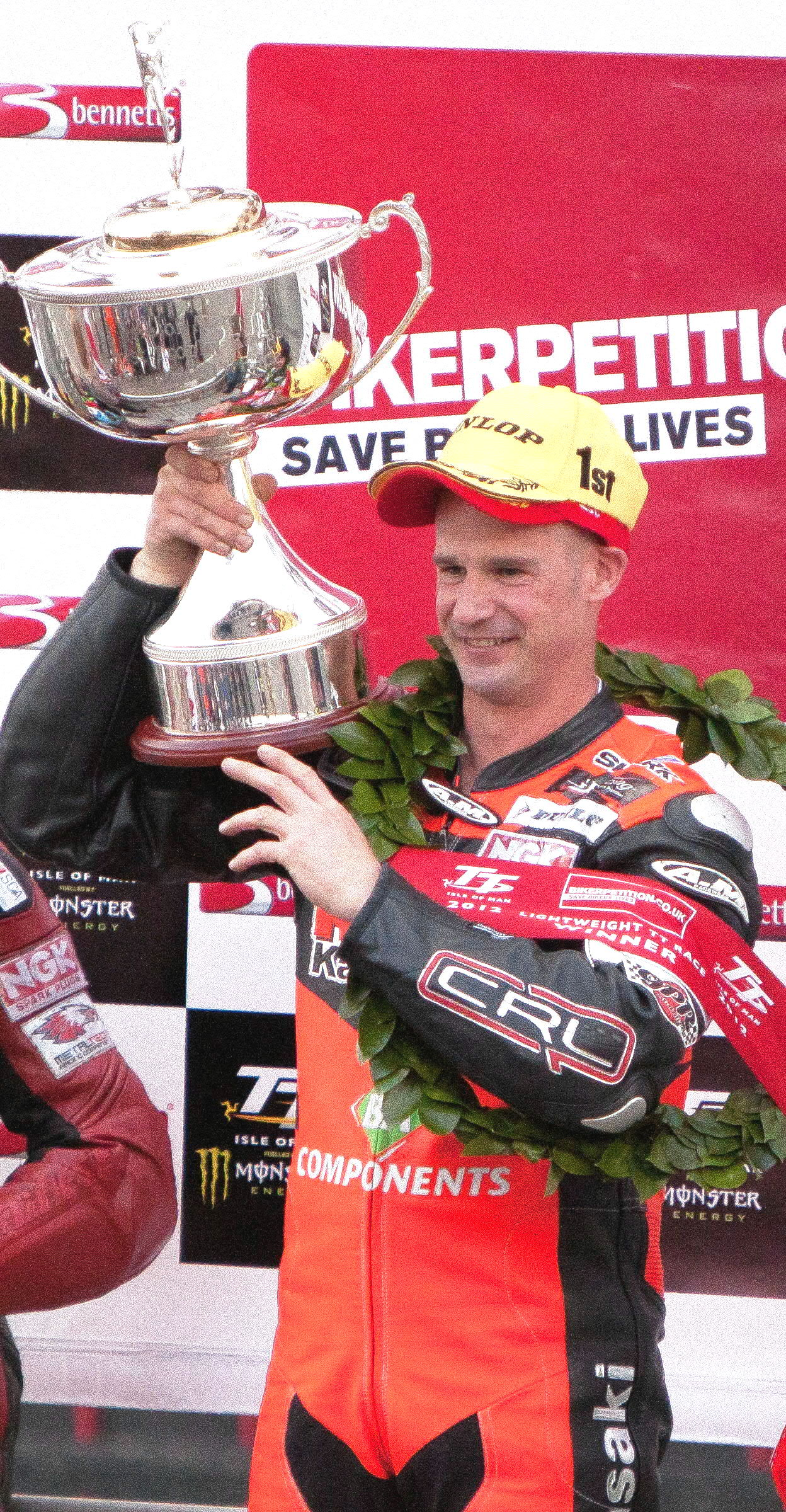
- Farquhar with 2012 Isle of Man TT Lightweight race winner's Trophy
- Nationality: Northern Irish
- Born: 2 February 1976 (age 50); Dungannon, Northern Ireland
- Current team: Tyco BMW
- Bike number: 16
Motorcycle racing career statistics
Isle of Man TT career
TTs contested	11 (2002 – 2010, 2012 2014)
TT wins	3
First TT win	2004 Production 600 TT
Last TT win	2012 Lightweight TT
TT podiums	12

Ryan Alan Robert Farquhar BEM (born 2 February 1976, Dungannon, Northern Ireland) is a former professional motorcycle racer who primarily competed in road racing. Farquhar won the Geoff Duke Trophy as Champion of the Dukes Road Racing Rankings a record seven times. He won five races at the Cookstown 100 in one day and holds the most Irish national wins by any one rider, at 201. He previously raced a Kawasaki ZX-10R, a Kawasaki ZX-6R and a Kawasaki ER6.

For the 2016 season, Farquhar was contracted to ride Tyco BMW Racing Team 1000 cc machines, whilst campaigning his own machinery in other events, but suffered serious injuries in a race crash at the North West 200 on 12 May. He revealed the severity of his multiple-injuries in October 2016, and confirmed his hopes of a return to the sport, but in 2017 commented his fitness to race would be unlikely, that he was unable to exercise due to the injuries, and that he enjoyed his hobby of clay pigeon shooting.

== Racing career ==
=== 2003–2005 ===
Farquhar was known as one of the best riders to have never won an Isle of Man TT race – despite breaking the lap record in 2003 in the 600 class. That changed in 2004, when he won the Production 600 race on a Kawasaki. He then won the 2005 TT Supersport, giving him two victories on the Isle of Man.

=== 2006 ===
On 28 April 2006, Farquhar signed a new deal to ride with the factory TAS Suzuki Racing Team. Unfortunately, disaster struck at Cookstown road races, the first race of the year. He was involved in a collision with a back marker in practice where he suffered injuries which ruled him out of most of the season.

=== 2008 ===
In 2008, Farquhar was back to his best form dominating races week in week out, and ended the year as a double Irish Champion winning the Irish Superbike road racing championship, the Irish Supersport road racing Championship and finishing first overall in the Duke Road Race Rankings.

Farquhar had agreed to race for the McAdoo Kawasaki Racing Team for the 2008 season. However, they parted company in the week preceding the Isle of Man TT, meaning Farquhar participated in the TT riding for his new sponsor Kenny Harker, in the Superstock 1000 and Supersport 600 classes. Previously, Farquhar had enjoyed his early taste of success with McAdoo having had competed in the team's colours at such meetings as the Manx Grand Prix.

At the Southern 100 road races, he was able to claim three-second places from his three races. Racing got underway with the Senior Solo Founders race and on the second of the nine laps, Farquhar got into the lead for the first time on his Harker Kawasaki, and began to dice with Guy Martin, Ian Lougher and Conor Cummins in a close formation at the head of the field. By half race distance, Farquhar had been relegated to second by the Superbike of Martin, but he extended his own advantage over third placed Lougher and he was able to take a strong second place at the chequered flag, also setting his best ever lap around the 4.25-mile Billown Circuit at 110.389 mph.

Wednesday's racing was cancelled due to adverse conditions, so Ryan's next race came in Thursday's Supersport 600cc race where he was again embroiled in a terrific battle for the lead. Farquhar, Lougher and Cummins were together throughout the eight laps with the lead exchanging hands on countless occasions. He overtook Lougher each time at the final Castletown Corner but the superior acceleration of Lougher's machine saw him back in the lead by the time they reached the finish line and this was how it unfolded on the final lap. Farquhar took another runner-up spot, missing out on the win by just 0.268 seconds although he did have the consolation of setting the fastest lap of the race at 106.534 mph.

With the weather deteriorating all the time, the feature Solo Championship race got underway in very damp conditions and Ryan slotted into second place after the opening two laps. On the fourth lap, the red flag came out due to an incident and the result declared at three laps thus giving Farquhar his third runner-up spot from his three races.

=== 2009 ===
During a record breaking 2009 season, Farquhar surpassed Joey Dunlop's total of 118 Irish National road race wins, by taking a clean-sweep at Killalane. By the end of the race meeting, Farquhar had amassed three more than the total set by Dunlop, whilst it also moved him on to a staggering 60 for the season. 2009 saw Farquhar chalk up 61 race wins and take 6 National championships. He was in attendance at the Irish Racer Magazine awards ceremony in Belfast where he picked up both the National Road Racer of the Year and Team of the Year awards.

Farquhar received the highly prestigious Duke Road Race Rankings trophy, the third time he had taken this particular award, given to the rider who records the highest number of points over the 25 road races held in the British Isles during the course of the year. In the Irish Motorcyclist of the Year category, he won third place behind Eugene Laverty, who won the trophy, and Jonathan Rea. Farquhar beat Laverty and Rea when he was voted the NGK Enkalon Irish Motorcyclist of the Year, by the general public.

=== 2010 ===
For the 2010 racing season, Farquhar joined forces with the MSS Colchester Kawasaki Racing Team for his Superbike campaign. For the season, he campaigned a specially prepared Kawasaki Ninja ZX-10R Superbike to race in the Isle of Man TT, North West 200 and Ulster GP road races, whilst he also continued with his own KMR Kawasaki machinery in the Supersport and Superstock divisions. The Superbike livery was identical colours to the MSS Colchester Kawasaki British Superbike Team, while the 600cc and Superstock machines were styled in Farquhar's familiar black and orange livery. At the 2010 Isle of Man TT, Farquhar took two second-place finishes, in the Superstock and Senior TTs. Farquhar's tremendous 2010 road racing season continued when he claimed the annual Southern 100 Championship title on the Isle of Man.

Farquhar wrapped up his superb 2010 racing season with more success, when he took two wins at the annual Sunflower Trophy races at Bishopscourt. Proving his dexterity on both the pure-road and short circuits, he overcame the considerable challenge of Marty Lennon to take both of the Super Twins races thus meaning he ended the year with a total of 60 race wins from his road racing and short circuit exploits, which resulted in Farquhar receiving the 2010 Irish Road Racer of the Year Award.

=== 2011 ===
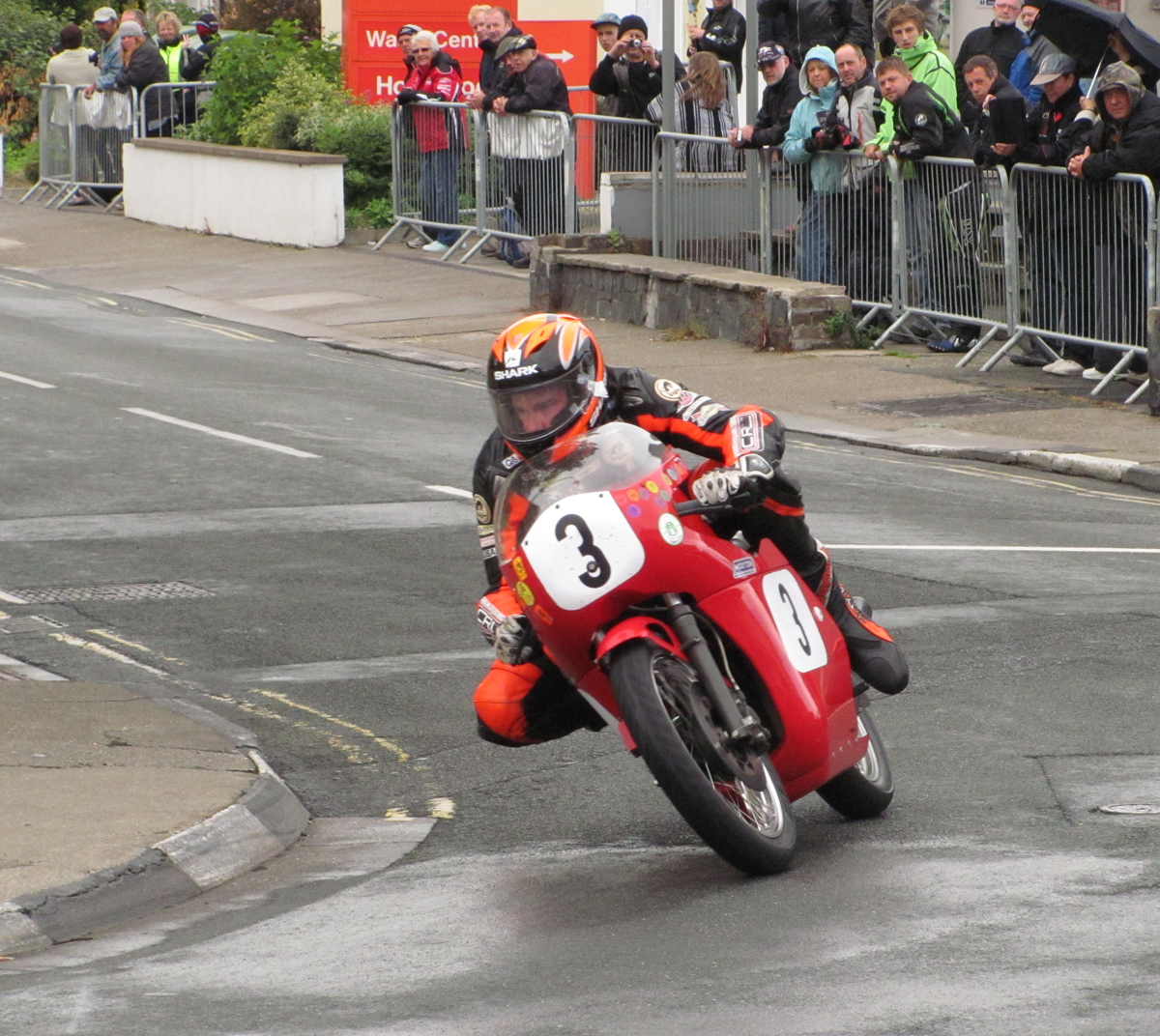
Farquhar at Parliament Square, Ramsey, Isle of Man during 2011 Classic Junior TT race, part of the Manx Grand Prix

2011 saw a mixed season for Farquhar. On the notable side, he signed both fellow Irishman Adrian Archibald and Hungarian Sandor Bitter to campaign for the KMR Kawasaki squad. The move saw Bitter campaign a Superstock-spec Kawasaki ZX-10R at the three International road races – the North West 200, Isle of Man TT and Ulster Grand Prix – in the Superbike and Superstock races.

In 2011, Farquhar won all seven races he started at the Ian Watson Trophy races at Oliver's Mount, Scarborough, including the feature trophy race for the fourth consecutive year. This was followed up by Farquhar winning all five races of the Cookstown 100 road races he started, taking the honours in the Grand Final, Open, Supersport 600, 450 and Super Twin races.

The winning vein continued with a double victory at the Tandragee 100 road races. However, his winning start to the season was tempered with disappointment at the North West 200, which saw Farquhar suffering one of his worst meetings in years. Ryan had been hoping to put on a strong showing around the 8.9-mile circuit but all he had to show for his efforts was a seventh place in the Supersport race.

A security alert and worsening weather conditions meant a lengthy delay to proceedings but eventually the Superbikes came to the line and with another good start, Farquhar slotted into second behind Michael Dunlop. The duo exchanged positions on the run to Magherabuoy before Alastair Seeley hit the front. As the newly formed trio passed through Dhu Varren, Farquhar lost the back end twice and he was lucky to stay on. Unbeknown to him, the bike had sprung an oil leak although the bike was still running at full power but further along the coast road, Farquhar realised something was wrong and he pulled off the course as soon as it was safe to do so and his race was over. The race was subsequently stopped and a clear up process begun but with rain continuing to fall, the organisers were unable to make the track safe for racing and the decision was ultimately made to abandon the rest of the meeting.

Bad luck then accompanied Farquhar to the TT where as a consequence of a crash during the final practice session, he was initially ruled out of the racing programme. He crashed at Keppel Gate in the closing stages of the session when he hit a false neutral on his Superbike machine. Although no bones were broken in the spill, Farquhar admitted he was too battered and bruised to continue. He took 13th in the 2011 Senior race. Following the injuries sustained practice, he believed he would be out of action for the entire race week but having completed a practice lap on Thursday, he stated his intention to race, lapping at more than 126 mph on his Superstock machine for a solid finish.

July saw Farquhar again back in action on the Isle of Man with some strong results at the Southern 100 road races. Taking the wins in both of the Supertwins races, he backed this up with third in the main Solo Championship race. Farquhar also grabbed another third in the Senior race and fifth in the Open race, the only blemish coming with a retirement in the 600cc race. He finished his 2011 Irish road race season with another haul of wins, this time claiming a hat-trick at the Killalane Road Races.

The meeting went ahead after the removal of a controversial chicane and Farquhar claimed victories on the KMR Kawasakis in the Superbike, Supertwin and 450cc races also adding a brace of seconds to his results for the day. The conclusion of his 2011 road racing season saw Farquhar win all seven of his races at the International Gold Cup at Oliver's Mount, Scarborough, the highlight of which was getting his name on the feature trophy for the very first time. It was also the first time an Irishman had won the Gold Cup in its 60-year history and Ryan also added the David Jefferies, Darran Lindsay and Phil Mellor trophies to his haul of silverware.

=== 2012 ===
Farquhar opened his 2012 account at Bishopscourt where he won both Supertwin races. His teammates Jamie Hamilton and Conor Parkhill both joined him on the podium. He took a hat-trick of race wins and the Man of the Meeting award at the Tandragee 100 road races. He took the honours in the Open, Supertwins and Moto 450 races and backed this up with two extremely hard fought runner-up spots behind Michael Dunlop in the Supersport and feature Superbike events.

For the 2012 season, Farquar fielded what is widely regarded as the strongest contingent of riders yet to compete for his KMR Kawasaki Team, having signed Michael Rutter and Kirk Jamison to ride for him at the Isle of Man TT Races and North West 200 respectively. Rutter joined Farquhar on the orange and black ER6 Kawasaki Supertwin for the re-introduced Lightweight TT.

The signing of Rutter was seen as a terrific coup for the team, and Farquar also had the added satisfaction of landing the signature of veteran rider Jeremy McWilliams who made his debut at the Relentless International North West 200. McWilliams was part of the podium trio for what Farquhar described as his "proudest moment in racing" when the three podium places at the inaugural Supertwins race at the North West 200 all went to riders astride KMR Kawasaki Racing machinery, led home by Farquhar himself.

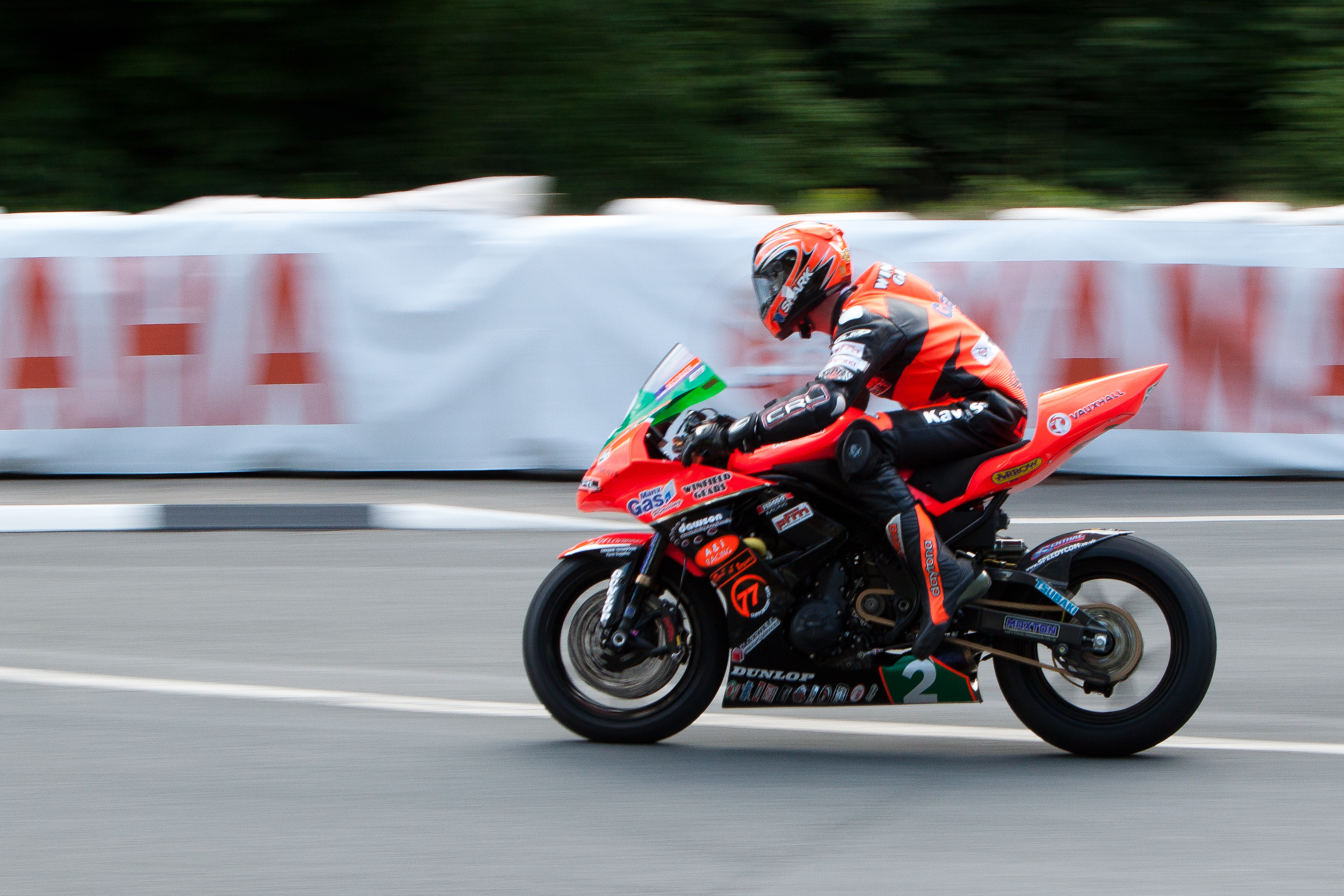
Farquhar at the 2012 Lightweight TT

The KMR Kawasaki Team's 2012 Isle of Man TT races got off to a disappointing start when both Farquhar and Hamilton were forced to retire from the opening 6-lap Superbike TT race. Farquhar was forced out on the third lap after experiencing handling problems from lap one onwards whilst Hamilton, on his TT race debut, had to stop on the fifth lap with suspected fuel pump problems. He took third place in the Superstock TT race. In contention for the win early on, he pushed eventual victor John McGuinness hard but an oil leak slowed him in the closing stages and he had to settle for third. It was his 11th Isle of Man TT podium in total and made up for the problems encountered in both the earlier Supersport race and Saturday's Superbike encounter.

Ryan Farquhar completed his 2012 Isle of Man TT campaign with victory in the re-introduced Lightweight TT race. Having already taken third in the Superstock and second Supersport races, Farquhar overcame a strong challenge from James Hillier and, having led on the first lap, a difference in pit stop strategies meant that he had to wait until the start of the third lap before re-taking the lead. His eventual winning margin was almost 30 seconds as he swept to the third TT win of his career. The win resulted in Farquhar finishing sixth in the Joey Dunlop TT Championship Trophy, with 32 points.

=== 2016 ===
On 16 March 2016, it was announced that Farquhar would be part of the Tyco BMW Team for some of the 2016 racing season, taking over Guy Martin's entries for the Isle of Man TT on a Superbike, as well as campaigning a BMW Superstock machine. In addition Farquhar campaigned his own Kawasaki ER6 in Supertwin events.

- Cookstown 100

Farquhar's 2016 season got under way at the Cookstown 100, the opening event in the Irish motorcycling calendar in which he secured second place on the podium in the Super Twin event.

- North West 200

Farquhar joined the Tyco BMW squad for the North West 200 races, again riding his own machinery in the Super Twin event. During the Super Twin race, whilst leading the field, Farquhar lost control of his machine when dicing for the lead with Dan Cooper, on the third lap approaching Black Hill.

Farquhar was impacted by Cooper's machine and after treatment at the scene to stabilise his condition was transported by helicopter to the Royal Victoria Hospital, Belfast where he underwent surgery for his injuries.

== 77 Supporters Club ==
Farquhar's fan club, is known as the 77 Supporters Club – his favoured race entrance number. Members of the club routinely hold "ride outs" on various public road courses, particularly in Ireland.

== Retirement and comeback ==
Following the death of his uncle, Trevor Ferguson, during the 2012 Manx Grand Prix, Farquhar announced his retirement from road racing with immediate effect.

However, in December 2013, Farquhar announced he would make a comeback alongside former rival Keith Amor for the KMR Racing Team in the Supertwins class at the 2014 Isle of Man TT. He began his comeback at the Ian Watson Spring Cup at Oliver's Mount in Scarborough, where he scored two-second places in Supertwins races.

Amor and Farquhar entered the 2014 Tandragee 100, where Farquhar won the 500 Classic and 450 races to score the 200th and 201st wins of his career. Farquhar subsequently appeared as part of a four-strong KMR line-up at the 2014 North West 200, alongside Amor, Jeremy McWilliams and Connor Behan. Farquhar finished fifth and sixth in the two Supertwins races. At the TT itself, he finished seventh in the Lightweight TT Supertwin race.

Farquhar subsequently retired from motorcycle racing in order to concentrate on the management of his racing team.

Farquhar was awarded the British Empire Medal (BEM) in the 2020 Birthday Honours for services to motorcycle racing.

== See also ==
- KMR Racing Team
