= KMR Racing Team =

Motorcycle racing team

(United Kingdom) KMR Kawasaki Racing Team
- 2012 name: KMR Kawasaki Racing Team
- Base: Dungannon, County Tyrone,* Northern Ireland
- Team principal/s: Ryan Farquhar
- Race riders: Ryan Farquhar; Michael Rutter; Jeremy McWilliams; Keith Amor; Jamie Hamilton
- Motorcycle: Kawasaki
- Tyres: Dunlop
- Riders' Championships: Multiple Irish National Road Race Championships

The KMR Kawasaki Racing Team, is a motorcycle racing team owned and managed by Ryan Farquhar. The team's headquarters are in Dungannon, County Tyrone, Northern Ireland.

== Launch ==
Ryan Farquhar launched his new team under the KMR Kawasaki banner in 2009, with the aim of competing at International and National road race meetings.

For its launch, the team had secured a new sponsorship deal with Rockstar Energy Drinks.

Prior to the team's inception, Farquhar had enjoyed one of his most successful seasons to date in 2008, when he won both the Irish Superbike and Supersport Road Race Championships.

In 2008, Farquar had also finished top of the Duke Road Racing Rankings whilst also impressing greatly at the Isle of Man TT with no less than five top six finishes from his five rides.

== 2010 ==
2010 saw Farquar joining forces with MSS Colchester Kawasaki for his Superbike campaign.

However, he campaigned KMR Kawasakis in the Supersport and Superstock divisions. The Superbike was therefore run in identical colours to the MSS Colchester Kawasaki British Superbike Team whilst the 600cc and Superstock machines were operated in the KMR black and orange livery.

== 2011 ==
2011 resulted in a mixed season for KMR Kawasaki Racing. On the notable side, Farquhar signed both fellow Irishman Adrian Archibald, and Hungarian Sandor Bitter to campaign for the KMR Kawasaki squad. The move saw Bitter campaign a Superstock-spec Kawasaki ZX-10R at the three International road races - the North West 200, Isle of Man TT and Ulster Grand Prix - in the Superbike and Superstock races.

KMR Kawasaki put in a dominant display at Bishopscourt when they took the honours in the two Supertwin races at the annual Sunflower Trophy meeting. With Jeremy McWilliams and Jamie Hamilton joining Farquhar on the ER6 650cc machines, the trio completed a 1-2-3 in both races as Hamilton and McWilliams took the race wins.

== 2012 ==
For the 2012 season, KMR Kawasaki has fielded what is widely regarded as the strongest contingent of riders yet to compete for the team, having signed Michael Rutter and Kirk Jamison to ride at the Isle of Man TT Races and North West 200 respectively.

Rutter also joined Farquhar on the orange and black ER6 Kawasaki Supertwin for the re-introduced Lightweight TT. The signing of Rutter was seen as a terrific coup for the team, and Farquar also had the added satisfaction of landing the signature of veteran rider Jeremy McWilliams. Rutter and McWilliams were part of the podium trio for KMR Kawasaki, for what Farquhar described as his "proudest moment in racing," when the three podium places at the inaugural Supertwins race at the North West 200 all went to riders astride KMR Kawasaki Racing machinery, with the trio being led home by Fraquhar himself.

The KMR Kawasaki Team's 2012 Isle of Man TT races got off to a disappointing start when both Farquhar and Jamie Hamilton were forced to retire from the opening 6-lap Superbike TT race. Farquhar was forced out on the third lap after experiencing handling problems from lap one onwards whilst Hamilton, on his TT race debut, had to stop on the fifth lap with suspected fuel pump problems. Farquhar quickly put the disappointment of two previous retirements behind him to take third place in the Superstock TT race - although he was in contention for the win early on.

KMR Kawasaki completed the 2012 Isle of Man TT campaign with victory in the re-introduced Lightweight TT race. Having already taken third in the Superstock and second Supersport races, Farquhar overcame a strong challenge from James Hillier and, having led on the first lap, a difference in pit stop strategies meant that he had to wait until the start of the third lap before re-taking the lead. His eventual winning margin though was almost 30 seconds as he swept to the third TT win of his career.

== Supertwin racing ==
KMR Kawasaki have been pivotal in the development of the 650 cc Supertwin class of racing using the ER-6 engine, and continue to enjoy considerable success in this class of racing.
