= Parliament Square, Ramsey =

Place in the Isle of Man

Coordinates: 54°19′17″N 4°23′10″W

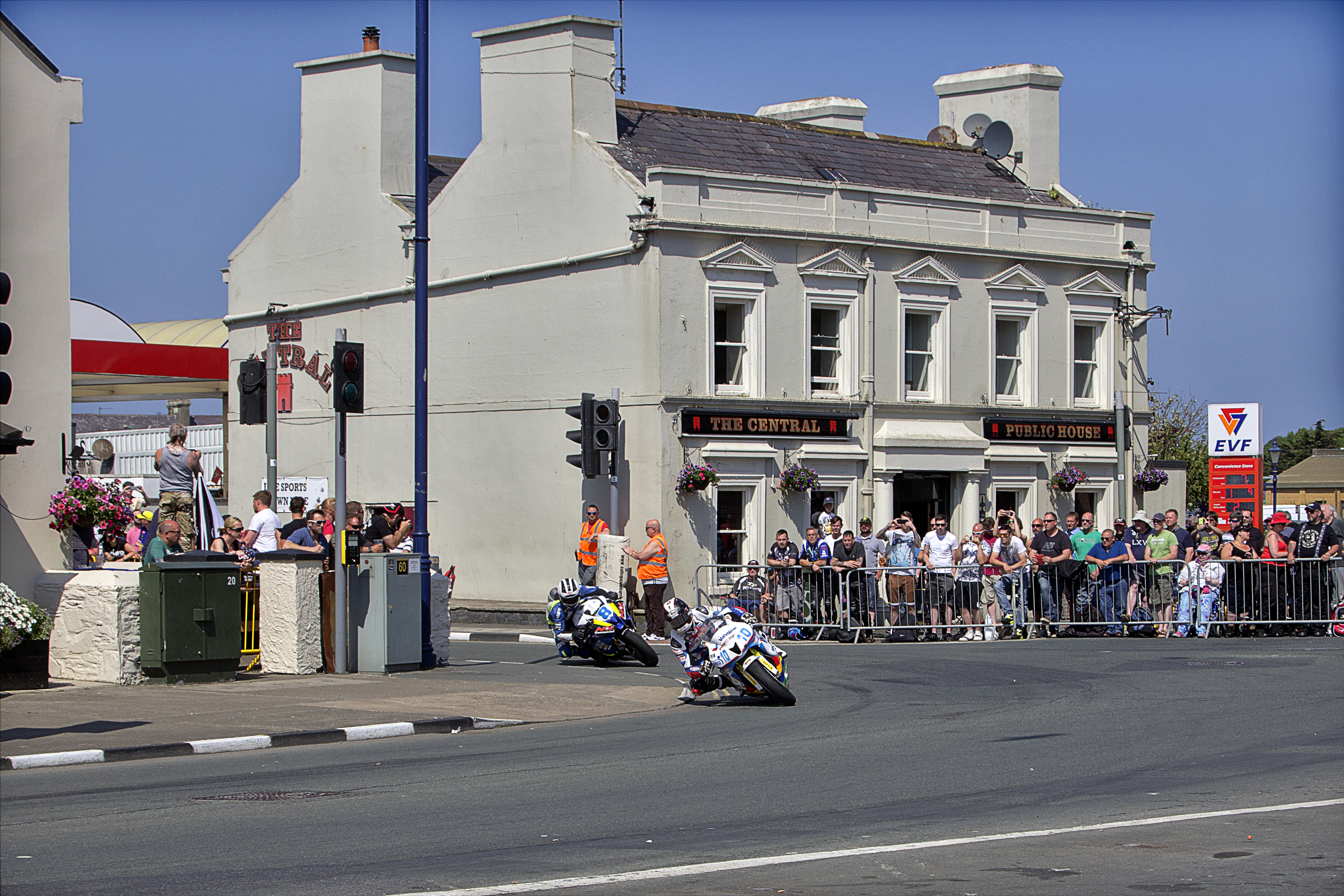
Conor Cummins leading William Dunlop into Parliament Square, 2016 TT Supersport race 1

Parliament Square, Ramsey (Manx: Kerrin y Valley or Market Square) is situated between the 23rd and 24th Milestone road-side markers on the Snaefell Mountain Course used for the Isle of Man TT Races on the junction of the primary A3 Castletown to Ramsey road, the A9 Ramsey to Andreas road and A2 Douglas to Ramsey road situated in the town of Ramsey in the parish of Lezayre in the Isle of Man.

Parliament Square was part of the Highland Course and Four Inch Course used for the Gordon Bennett Trial and Tourist Trophy automobile car races held in the Isle of Man between 1904 and 1922. It is also the road junction of the A9 Bowring Road and A2 Albert Road in the town of Ramsey and this section of the Highroads Course was the eastern edge of the Sandygate Loop which included a nearby official refuelling stop for the 1904 Gordon Bennett British Eliminating Trial and 1905 Tourist Trophy Race for automobiles. The 1906 Tourist Trophy Race used the Short Highroad Course, with the abandonment of the Sandygate Loop in favour of the A3 Lezayre Road, the A2 Albert Road in the town of Ramsey, including a section of private road and the A18 Mountain Road.

Parliament Square is part of the Snaefell Mountain Course used since 1911 for the Isle of Man TT and from 1923 for the Manx Grand Prix Races. Changes to the course occurred in 1923 with the adoption of a private road between Parliament Square and May Hill in Ramsey. The course had previously had negotiated Albert Road and Tower Road in Ramsey and the new course length was now 37.739 miles (revised to 37.733 miles in 1938).
