= LiveWire (motorcycle) =

Electric motorcycle

Harley-Davidson LiveWire
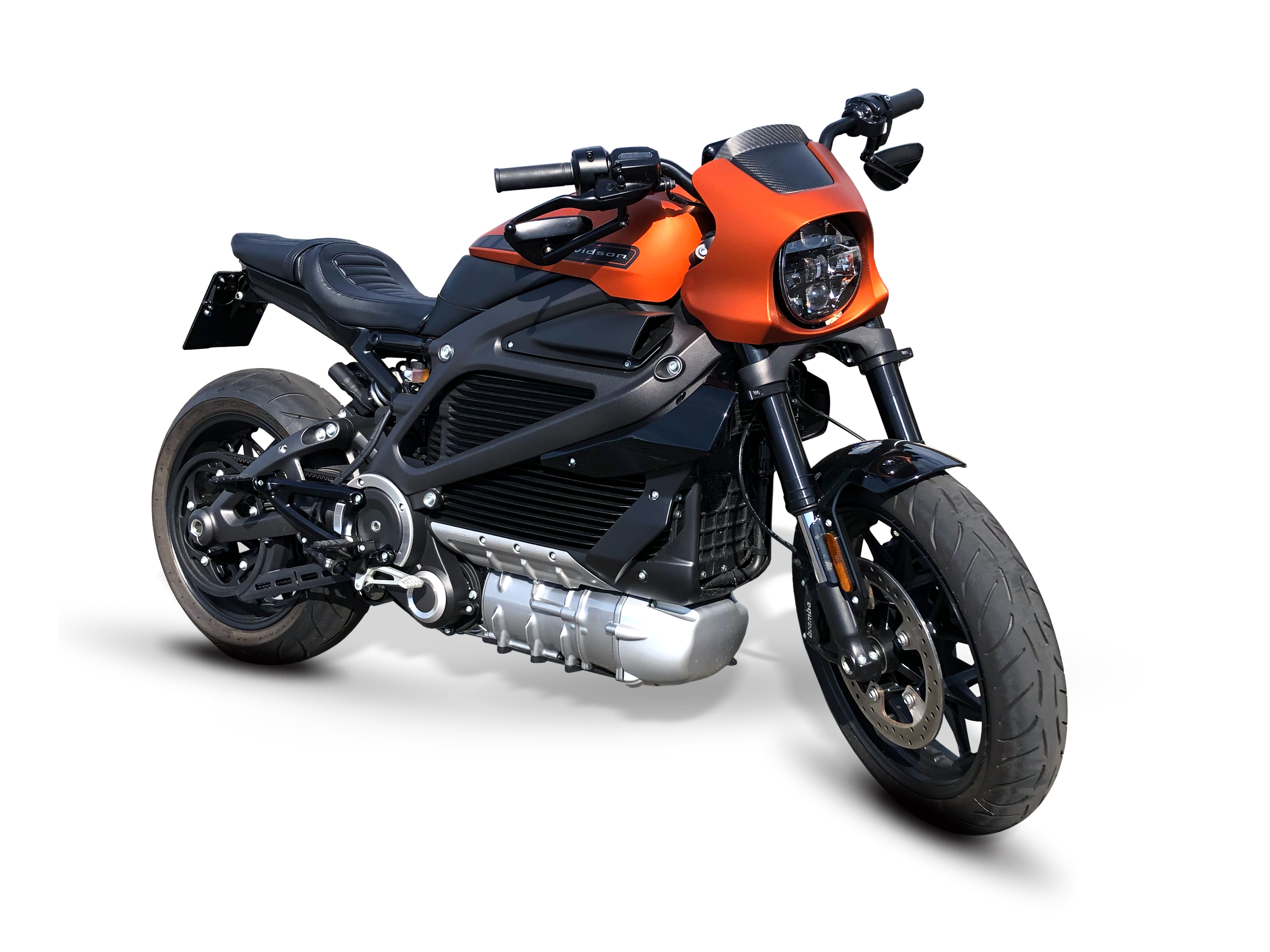
- Manufacturer: LiveWire
- Production: 2019
- Class: Electric motorcycle
- Engine: Electric liquid-cooled longitudinally-mounted three-phase induction electric motor
- Top speed: 115mph
- Power: 105 hp (78 kW)
- Torque: 86 lb⋅ft (117 N⋅m)
- Transmission: Single speed, belt drive via bevel gear
- Frame type: Cast aluminum trellis frame
- Tires: 17"
- Weight: 562 lb (255 kg) (dry)
- Fuel capacity: 15.5 kWh

The Harley-Davidson LiveWire is an electric motorcycle by Harley-Davidson, their first electric vehicle. Harley-Davidson says the maximum speed is 110 mph (180 km/h) with claimed 105 hp (78 kW) motor. The LiveWire, released in 2019, targets a different type of customer than their classic V-twin powered motorcycles.

In December 2021, the news was published that LiveWire would be spun-off from parent Harley Davidson, set to go public in the first half of 2022 as a SPAC (special-purpose acquisition company) valued at $1.77 billion.

== History ==
The LiveWire was first displayed to the media in June 2014. Prototypes were made available for public test rides at US Harley-Davidson dealerships later in 2014, then Europe and Canada in 2015. The LiveWire was inspired by the "Mission R" electric superbike, and the powertrains for the prototypes were developed in collaboration with its manufacturer, the electric motorcycle and electric powertrain technology company Mission Motors.

As the prototype was unveiled in 2014, the motor was to be mounted longitudinally, under the frame. A bevel gear was planned to change the direction of rotation 90° to drive a gilmer belt to turn the rear wheel. In the prototypes, the bevel gear gave the drivetrain a unique whirring sound, compared to the sound of a jet turbine, or as a writer for The Verge said, "like an oversized vacuum". According to Wired magazine in 2014, Mission Motors provided technical assistance on the motor controller.

In January 2018, Harley-Davidson announced that the motorcycle was entering production and would enter the market in 18 months. Preorders were planned for January 2019. The first deliveries were made in September 2019 but were temporarily halted due to an unspecified charging issue which Harley-Davidson resolved as of October 2019.

Harley-Davidson said Swiss rider Michel von Tell rode a LiveWire to an unofficial electric motorcycle distance-ridden-in-24-hours record in March 2020, covering 1,723 km (1,071 mi). Von Tell, accompanied by local journalists, began in Zürich, Switzerland, and rode to Stuttgart, Germany, continued along Lake Constance, and finished in Ruggell, Liechtenstein, in a total time of 23 hours and 48 minutes. The previous record of 1,317 km (818.27 mi) was set in 2018 on an electric Zero S.

In 2020, the streaming video series Long Way Up followed Ewan McGregor and Charlie Boorman riding LiveWires from South America to North America. They traveled 13,000 miles, through 13 countries over 100 days.

In July 2021 the company announced the LiveWire ONE, the first motorcycle from the new brand, to be available at 12 selected brand dealers in California, New York and Texas while stressing their "omni-channel model, combining the best of digital and physical, allowing the customer to interact with the brand on their own terms". The press release cites CEO Jochen Zeitz: "As part of The Hardwire Strategy, we made a commitment that Harley-Davidson would lead in electric. .. Harley-Davidson and LiveWire will continue to rewrite the motorcycle rulebook and we are excited about this next chapter in our legacy."

In December 2021, Harley Davidson announced that it would be spinning off its LiveWire division as a separate company, to be called LiveWire, set to go public in the first half of 2022 as a special-purpose acquisition company (SPAC) valued at $1.77 billion.

In February 2025 the company reported LiveWire sales results from 2023 and 2024 with 660 respectively 612 units.
Expectations for 2025 were named with 1,000 to 1,500 units, while operating loss shall be reduced from $93.9 million in 2024 down to $70 to $80 million.

== Reactions ==
When the electric motorcycle concept was unveiled in 2014, it was called "the most radical departure in the 111-year history of the brand" by a Fox Sports commentator. Other industry observers see the development of the LiveWire, and the potential development of an electric product or product line, as part of a shift towards "people who might not ordinarily be drawn to Harley's traditional loud, heavy, expensive motorcycles" and "the product of a painful corporate revolution long in the making" as Harley-Davidson uses new technology and markets to a wider customer base. The Milwaukee Journal Sentinel compared the LiveWire's styling to that of former Harley-Davidson sport bike subsidiary Buell.

The Hollywood Reporter noted that an electric Harley-Davidson could become a status symbol like the Tesla Model S, and that the new Harley-Davidson had been placed in Avengers: Age of Ultron. Road & Track posted spy shots from the set in 2014, and reported that Harley-Davidson would gauge the reception by the film's audience as a sort of global market test of the product concept.

Powersports Business said that initial customer reactions to test rides in New York in June 2014 were "overwhelmingly positive" but also noted some negative reactions to the tuning of the regenerative braking system.

Jalopnik said the LiveWire, at over $29,000, is "far too expensive" given the performance, range, and charge specifications.

TechCrunch writer Jake Bright said the LiveWire pricing "was too damn high", but gave Harley Davidson props for an EV debut that "checked out as a legitimate e-motorcycle entrant" while "passing the sniff test" of the company's traditional chrome and steel clientele – "who aren't exactly the Tesla crowd."

== Description ==
Technical specifications include:

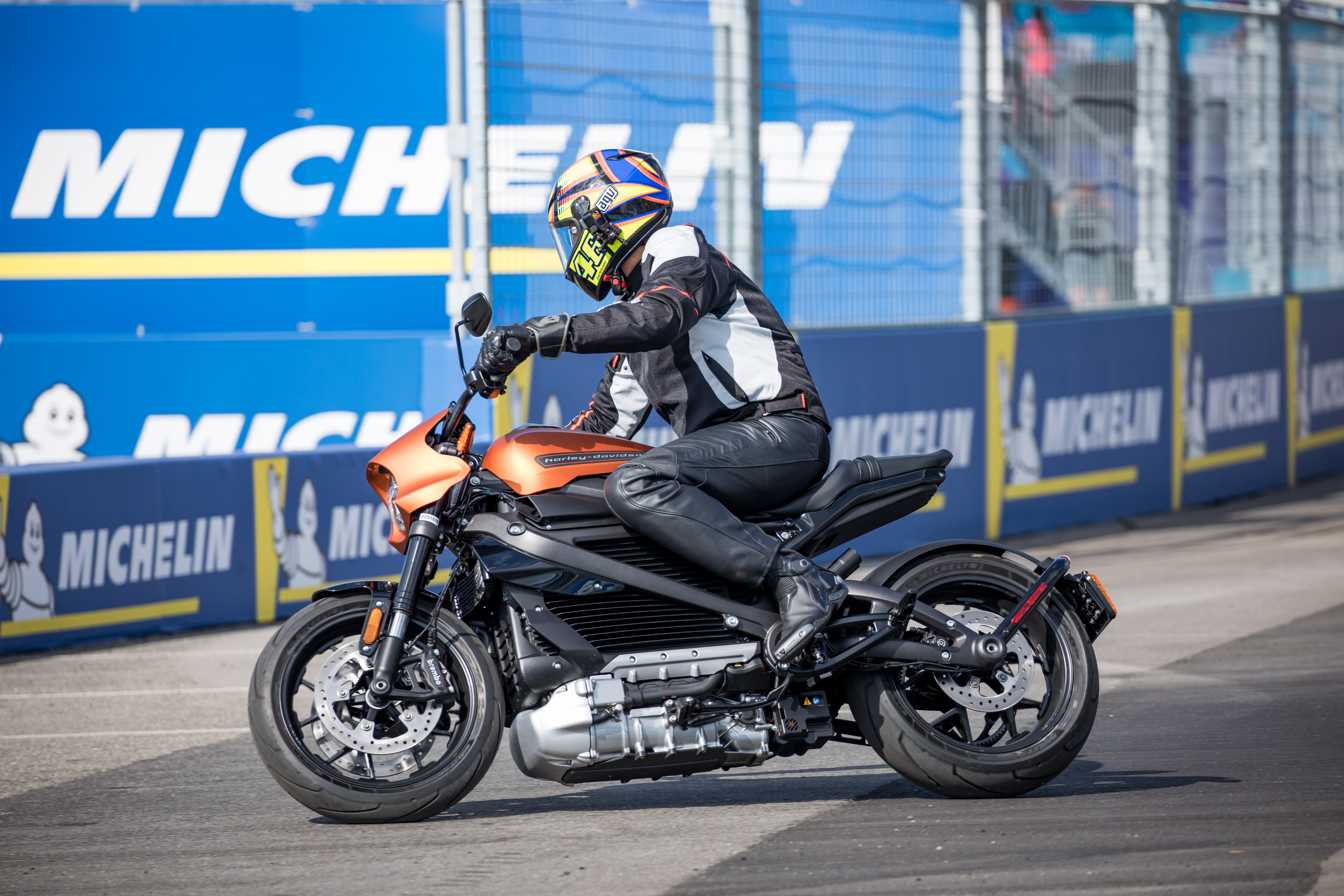
LiveWire test on Formula E track, New York, 2019

- Motor: 105 hp (78 kW), longitudinal design, 86 lb⋅ft (117 N⋅m) torque
- Power transmission: 90 degree gearbox with belt-driven rear wheel
- Cooling system: liquid, shared by motor and controller
- Battery: 15.5 kWh (56 MJ), 13.6 kWh (49 MJ) usable, Samsung cells, with 5-year, unlimited mileage warranty.
- Charging: supports Level 3 DC Fast Charging; comes with Level 1 charger that can be stored under the seat.
- 17-inch front & rear wheels
- Dual disc, monobloc 4-piston front brake, dual piston rear
- Length: 84.1 in. ; Weight: 562 lbs
- Cast aluminum frame and swingarm
- LED headlight
- TFT dashboard
- Trellis frame
- single speed powertrain

=== Performance ===
- 0–60 mph (0–97 km/h) in 3.0 seconds
- 60–80 mph (97–129 km/h) +1.9 seconds
- Top speed: 110 mph (180 km/h)
- Range: 146 mi (235 km)

== Gallery ==
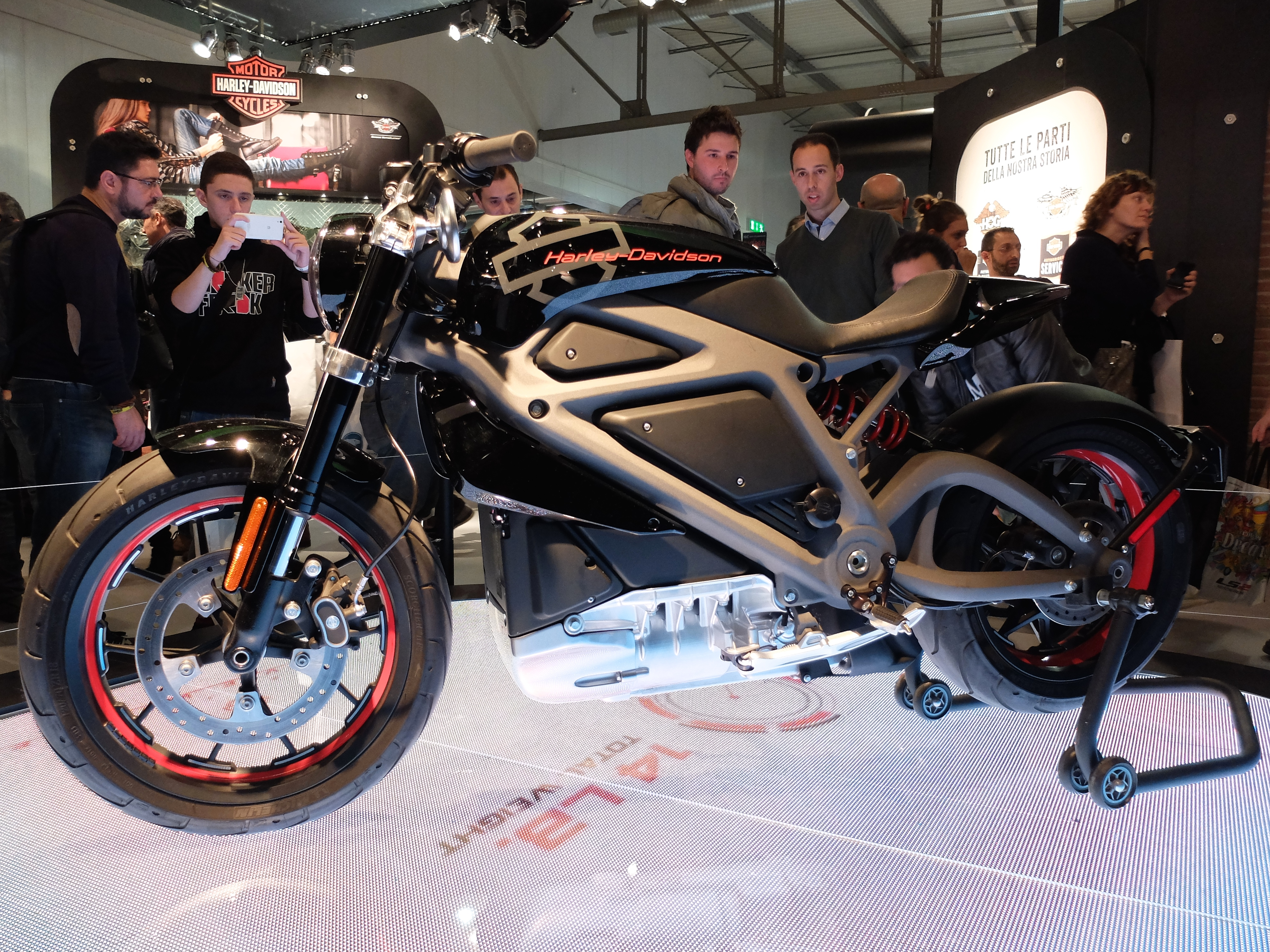
Left side displayed at MCN Motorcycle Live NEC Birmingham, 2014

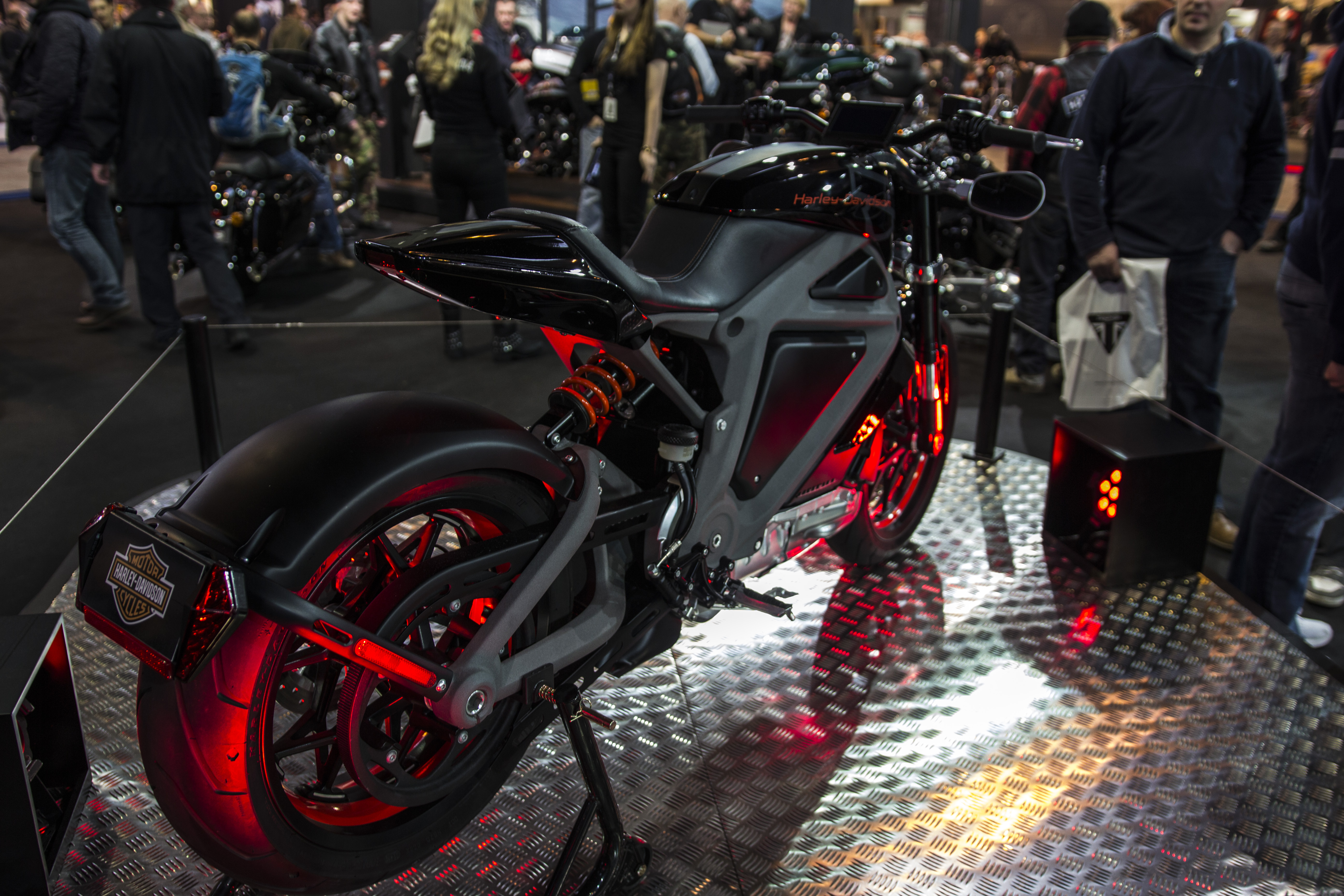
View of the rear of the 2014 model

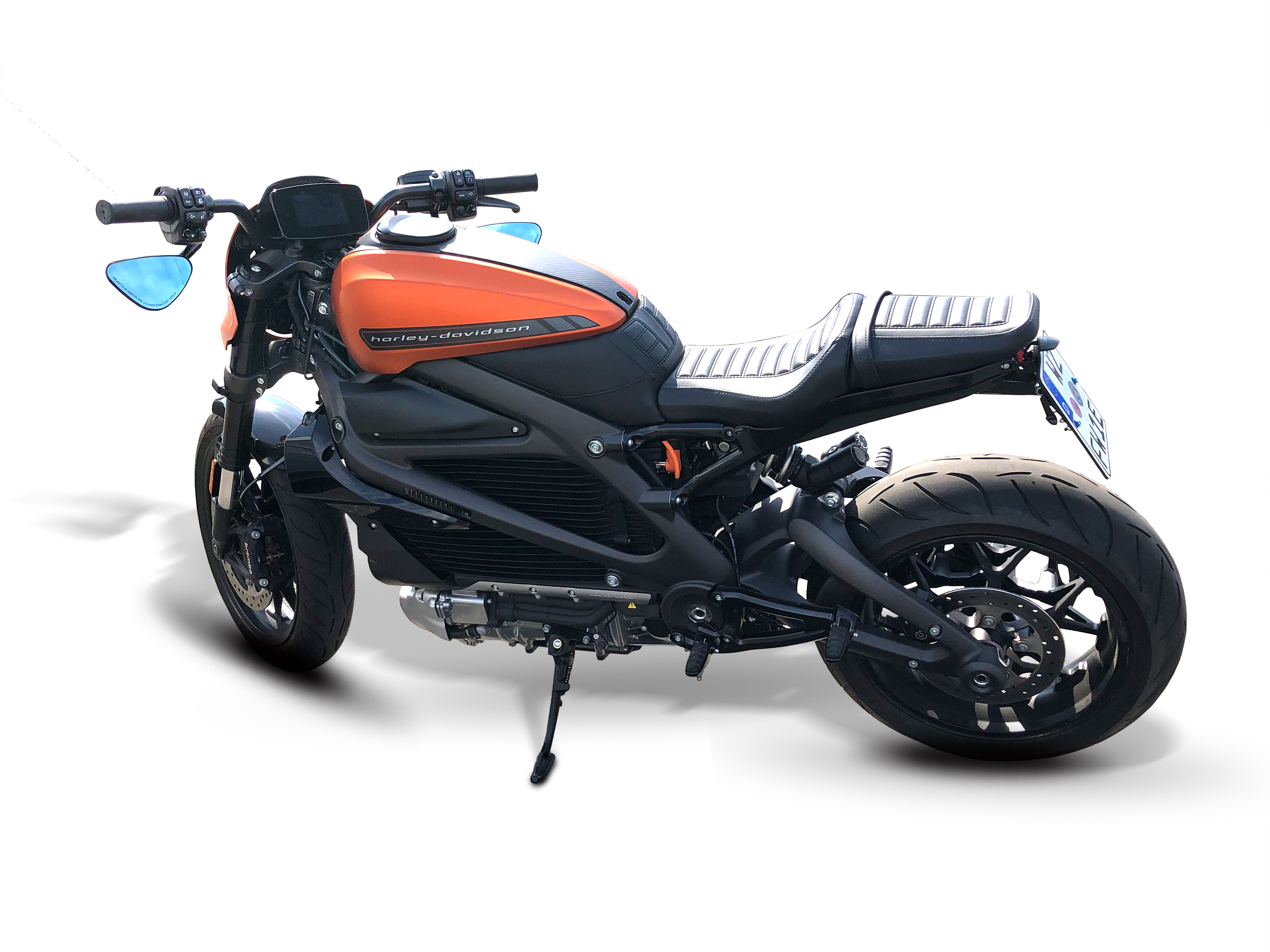
Newer model on display in 2022

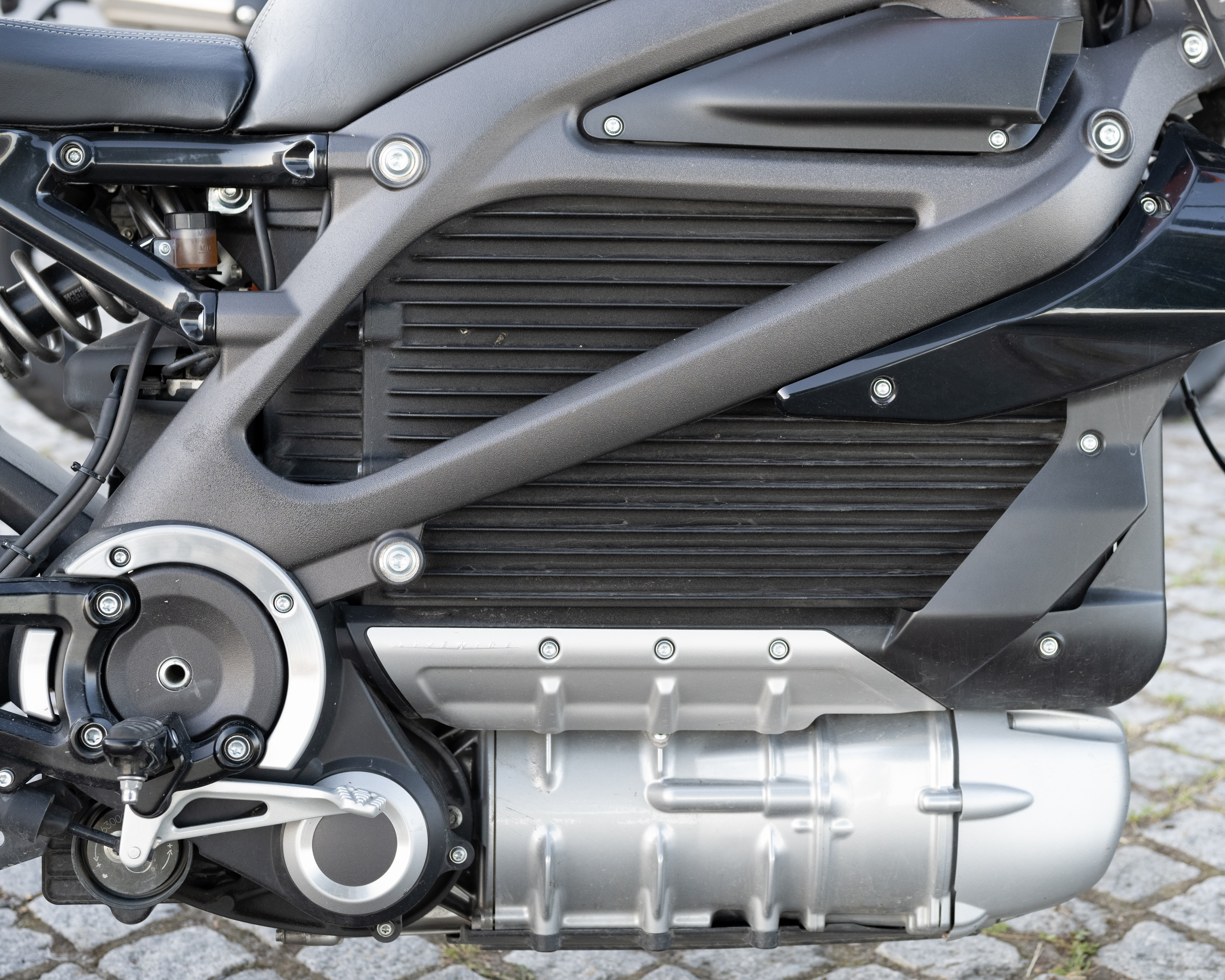
Close-up of the black battery and the silver powertrain
