= Zero XU =

Lightweight electric motorcycle

Zero XU is a lightweight electric motorcycle introduced in 2011 by Zero Motorcycles in Scotts Valley, CA.

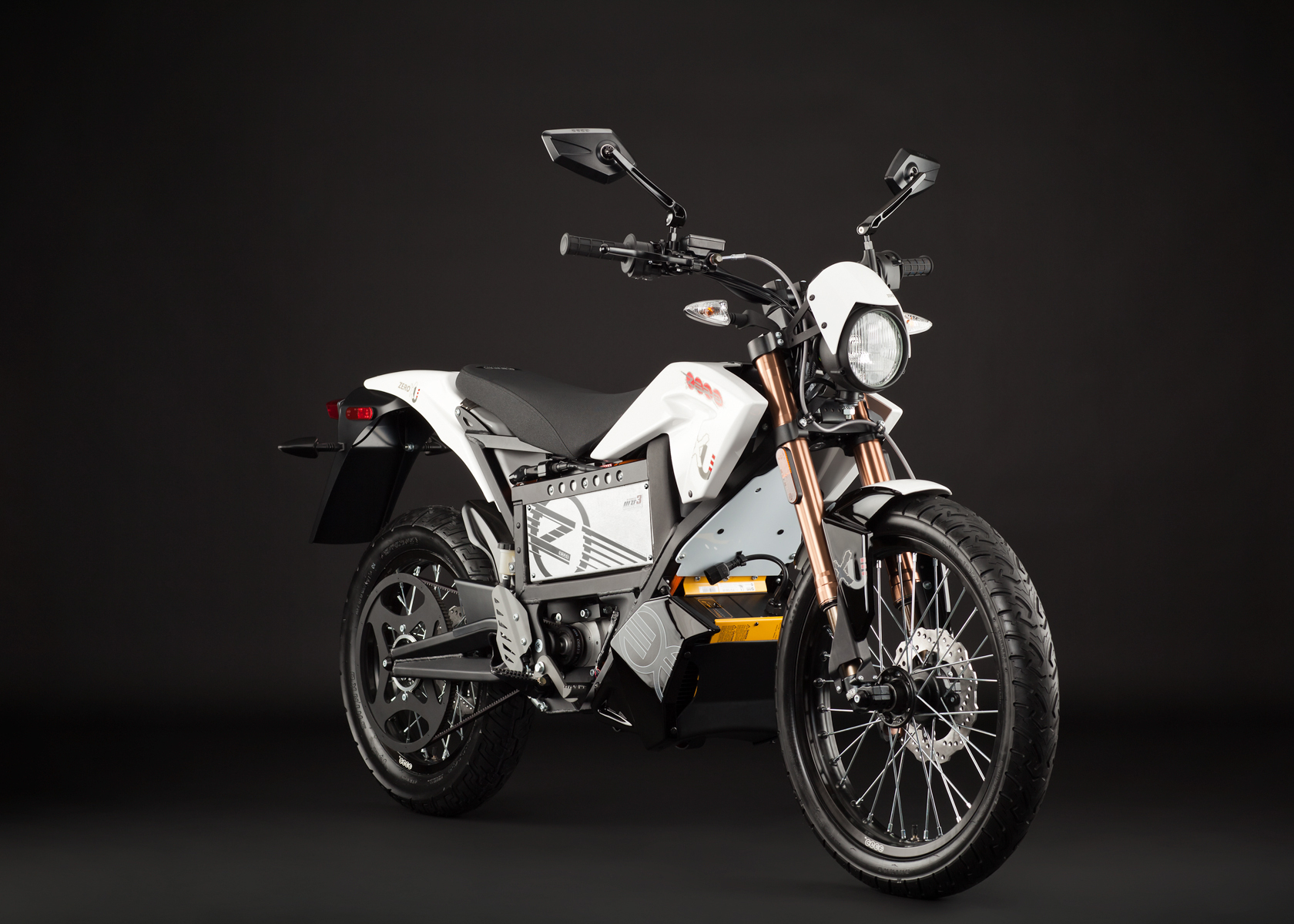
Zero-XU in 2012

The XU uses the Zero X dirtbike frame, road tires and a lower suspension for street riding.

== Model history ==
The 2011 XU has spoked wheels (19" front / 16" rear) and road tires. A bay for a single removable battery module allows for quick swaps or charging away from parking. The XU uses a brushed DC motor and chain drive. The onboard 1 kW charger allows 90+% charging in 2 hours, and an optional quick charge accessory drops the charge time to 1 hour.

In 2012 the XU switched to belt drive and to a single-rotor brushless AC motor, reducing bike maintenance. Battery capacity increased by 50%, and both range and top speed improved. The onboard 1 kW charger allows 95% charging in 3.4 hours, and an optional quick charge accessory allows 95% charging in 1.7 hours.

In 2013 the XU switched to the more powerful 75-5 motor developed by Zero Motorcycles. A second removable battery bay was added, and the XU is now sold as the ZF2.8 and ZF5.7 models with 1 or 2 battery modules installed. When a single battery module is installed, a lockable storage container can be held in the empty bay. The 2013 XU is now capable of highway operation with a maximum speed of 77 mph (124 km/h). The onboard charger is reduced in power to 650W (95% charge in 3.7, 7.4 hours for ZF2.8 and ZF5.7 respectively), but an optional CHAdeMO inlet provides a 1-hour 95% charge for both models.

The XU was discontinued after the 2013 model year.

== Specifications ==
All specifications are manufacturer claimed.

	2011 XU	2012 XU	2013 XU ZF2.8	2013 XU ZF5.7
Max Power	4.8 kW (6.4 hp)	14 hp (10 kW)	27 hp (20 kW)	28 hp (21 kW)
Max Torque		22 lbf⋅ft (30 N⋅m)	42 lbf⋅ft (57 N⋅m)	42 lbf⋅ft (57 N⋅m)
Top Speed	51 mph (82 km/h)	65 mph (105 km/h)	77 mph (124 km/h)	77 mph (124 km/h)
Weight	218 lb (99 kg)	221 lb (100 kg)	225 lb (102 kg)	267 lb (121 kg)
Capacity (nominal)	1.7 kWh	2.6 kWh	2.5 kWh	5.0 kWh
Range (EPA city)	25 miles (40 km)	42 miles (68 km)	38 miles (61 km)	76 miles (122 km)
Range (55 mph)		21 miles (34 km)	24 miles (39 km)	48 miles (77 km)
Range (70 mph)			17 miles (27 km)	35 miles (56 km)
MSRP	$7695	$7695	$7995	$10490

== See also ==
- List of motorcycles by type of engine
