= Scot Harden =

American off-road motorcycle racer

- Born: June 16, 1956 (age 70); Las Vegas, Nevada
- Known for: Off-Road Motorcycle Racing

Scot Harden is a professional off-road motorcycle racer. He has held managerial and executive positions at Husqvarna, KTM, BMW, and Zero Motorcycles.

== Motorcycle racing career ==
Scot started racing for Husqvarna in 1973. He was the SCORE BAJA 1000 Overall champion. in 1978. His major off-road championships include the Baja 1000, Baja 500, International Six Days Enduro (ISDE), Djerba 500 Rally, SCORE Champion, Best in the Desert and more. He was the AMA National Reliability Series Open Champion in 1982. In 1998 his name was included in the top 10 off-road riders in the history of the sport by Dirt Rider magazine. He captured the crown as the 1994 AMA National Enduro Vet Class Champion. At the Pikes Peak International Hill Climb in 1996, he took sixth place and Rookie of the Year honors. He was a rider and team manager for the Red Bull KTM Dakar Rally teams in 2004 and 2005.

== Motorcycle industry career ==
He joined Husqvarna in San Diego, California in 1982 as the Husky Products Accessory Manager and Desert/Offroad Team Manager. He was promoted to Western Region Sales Manager and then became the National Sales Manager for Cagiva North America in when they purchased Husqvarna in 1987. In 1988 he joined KTM USA as the Western Region Sales/Desert Racing/Media Relations manager and then became the VP of Marketing and Communications. He returned to Husqvarna in 2008 as the National Sales and Marketing Manager. He was VP of Global Operations for Zero Motorcycles before becoming the Chief Marketing Officer for Gas Gas Motorcycles and the Torrot Group in 2016. He served on the Motorcycle Industry Council's Electric Motorcycle Task Force and board of the Off Road Business Association (ORBA). He serves on the Motorcycle Industry Council's (MIC) Gas Tank mentor program.

Scot is the founder of Harden Offroad which is a consulting business for the power sports industry. He is also the Business Development and Sponsor Relations Director for Best in the Desert.

He was one of the co-writers for the book Chasing Dakar, a guide for adventure riding.

== Awards ==
- 1998 - AMA Hazel Kolb Brighter Image Award.
- 2008 - Inducted into the AMA Motorcycle Hall of Fame.
- 2014 - AMA Bessie Stringfield Award was given to him and Zero Motorcycles for their efforts to bring new riders into the fold.
- 2019 - 2019 Friend of the AMA award.
- 2020 - Inducted into the Trailblazers Hall of Fame.
- 2020 - Inducted into the Hot Shoe Hall of Fame.
- 2023 - Inducted into the Off-Road Motorsports Hall of Fame.
