= Tim Prentice =

Tim Prentice may refer to:

- Tim Prentice (designer) (born 1964), American industrial designer
- Tim Prentice (sculptor) (1930–2025), American sculptor
