= Zero Motorcycles =

American manufacturer of electric motorcycles

Zero Motorcycles, Inc.
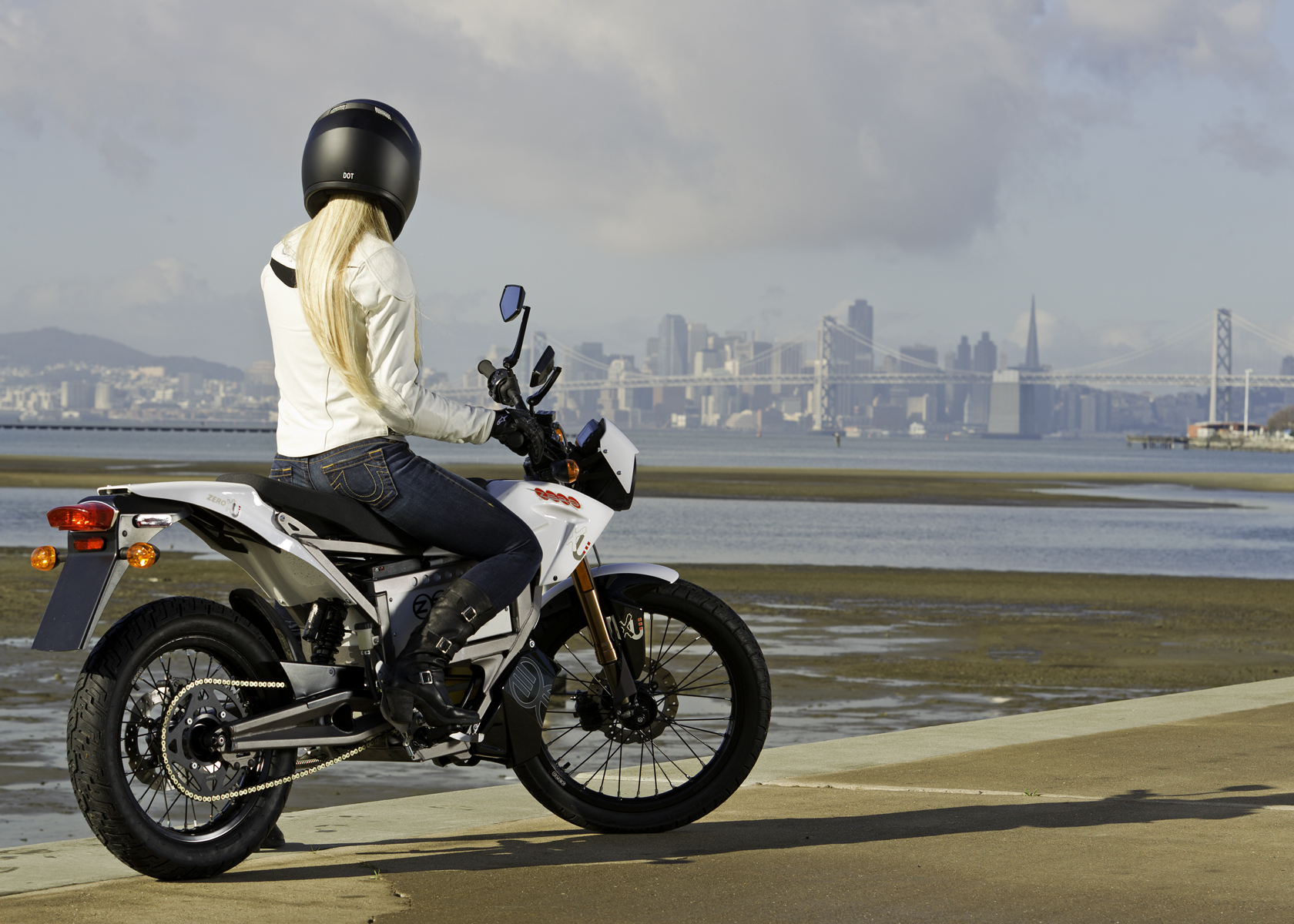
- Type: Private
- Industry: Automotive
- Founded: 2006; 20 years ago in Santa Cruz, California
- Founder: Neal Saiki
- Headquarters: Noord-Scharwoude, Netherlands
- Area served: Worldwide
- Key people: Pierre-Martin Bos (CEO); Abe Askenazi (CTO); Curt Sacks (CFO)
- Products: Electric motorcycles
- Website: www.zeromotorcycles.com

Zero Motorcycles Inc. is an American manufacturer of electric motorcycles. Formerly called Electricross, it was founded in 2006 by Neal Saiki, a former NASA engineer, in Santa Cruz, California.

Zero electric motorcycle models include the Zero S (street), SR (street racing), FXS (supermoto), DS (dual-sport), DSR (dual-sport racing), FX (motocross), SR/F and LS1 moped-style scooter.

In 2025 the company announced it would move key global functions from its innovation hub in Scotts Valley, California to its European headquarters in the Netherlands. Technical development would remain in the US with the Dutch facility becoming its new worldwide HQ.

== Model history ==
The Zero S began shipping in volume in 2010, the first model year to include the Agni Motor, at which time the DS, a dual-sport model based on the S chassis became available. The XU, a smaller street bike with a removable battery, based on the same chassis as the Zero dirtbikes was produced from 2011 to 2013.

In 2012, Zero introduced the ZF9 Power Pack with the Zero S & DS models making them the first production electric motorcycles that can exceed an EPA-estimated 100 miles on a single charge.

In 2013 the Zero S and DS were completely redesigned. The battery capacity was increased to 11.4 kWh, and a new brushless permanent magnet AC motor was introduced. In 2013 the Zero FX dual-sport model with modular removable power packs was introduced. CHAdeMO fast charging was also available on 2013 models.

In 2014 the optional 2.8 kWh "Power Tank" became available. 2014 also saw the addition of the Zero SR to the range, a higher performance version of the Zero S, incorporating more powerful controller electrics and a motor with higher temperature magnets.

The 2015 models had battery pack size increased to 12.5 kWh, for a total possible maximum capacity of 15.3 kWh including the optional Power Tank. Also introduced in 2015 were standard ABS brakes and Showa suspension. CHAdeMO fast charging was eliminated as an option, leaving instead an optional quick charger accessory at added cost.

In 2016, Zero announced the DSR and FXS models. The DSR is based on the DS, but with the more powerful motor from the SR. The FXS is a supermoto version of the FX. Additional changes for the model year include the availability of a "Charge Tank" accessory, which is an on-board Level 2 charging system compatible with the J1772 plug. Battery pack size improved again to 13.0 kWh (3.3 kWh per FX power pack), for a total possible maximum capacity of 15.9 kWh including the optional Power Tank. The air-cooled motors on the SR, DSR, and FXS were revised to reduce heat produced during high output.

For 2017, all models have the interior-permanent-magnet (IPM) motor. All models also received a larger capacity controller which provides an increase in maximum torque and horsepower output, up to 116 lbs/ft on the SR and DSR models. All models but the S ZF13.0 (Already Installed) receive a wider, high-torque carbon fiber reinforced belt. Other changes for 2017 include a locking tank box and more durable paint on S/DS/SR/DSR models, and the ability for owners to update their bike's firmware through the mobile app.

For 2018 Zero introduced the ZF14.4 battery, available for the S and D models (alongside the ZF7.2 battery) and the SR and DSR models (where it is the only available option). Until the introduction of the 2020 SR/F, traction control was absent across the lineup.

For 2020, new trellis-framed motorcycles were introduced, the SR/f and the faired SR/s, with higher performance, as well as 6 kW and 12 kW onboard charging options.

Zero Motorcycles also produces a line of electric motorcycles for police, authority, and military use. The fleet motorcycles are based upon the company's standard models but outfitted with equipment such as police lights, sirens, crash bars, and storage accessories.

In 2023, ZERO Motorcycles entered into the Australian market distributed through Peter Stevens Motorcycles, but in September 2025 failed to break into the EV market and liquidated its assets through Pickles Auctions.

== Gallery ==
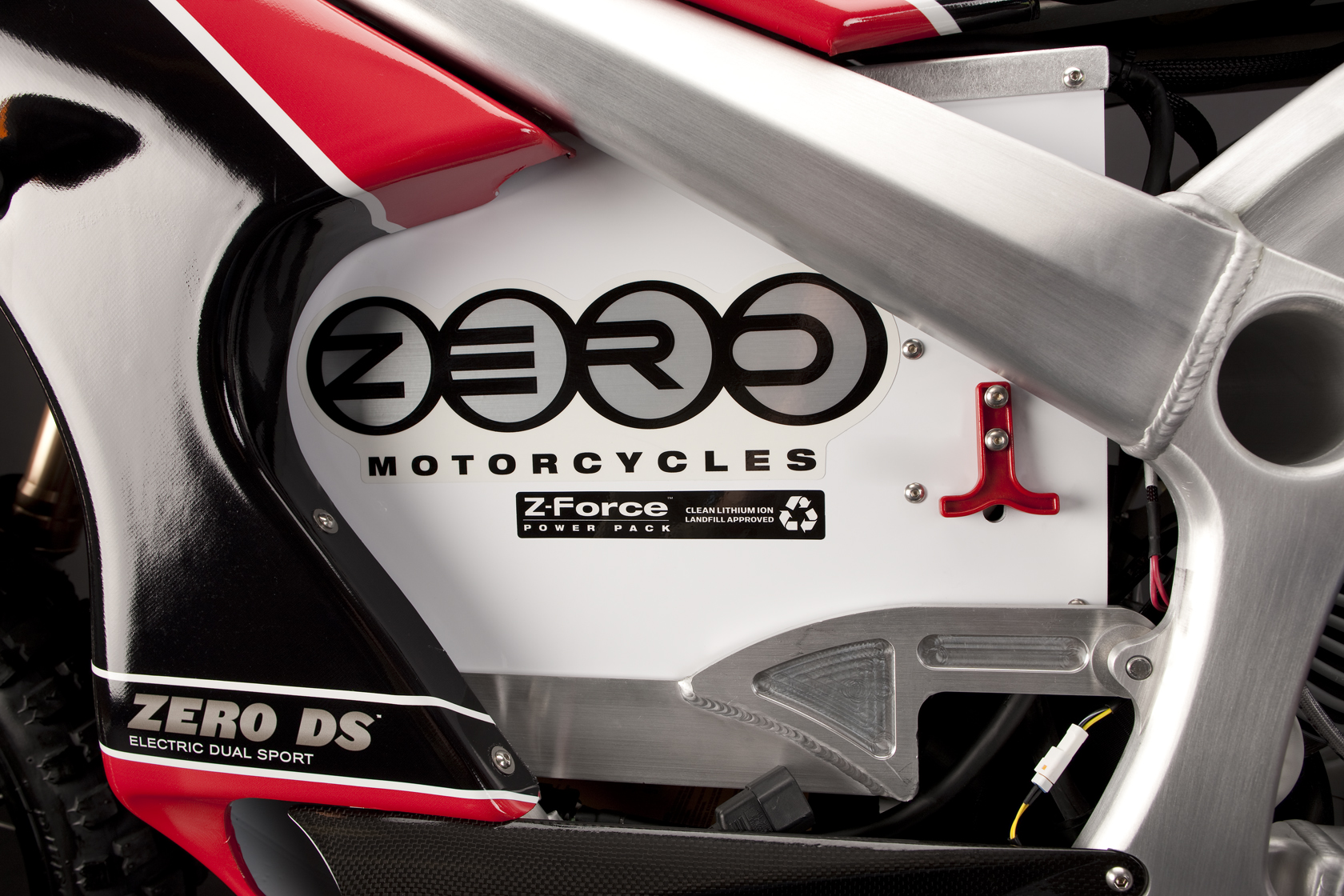
Close-up of earlier logo

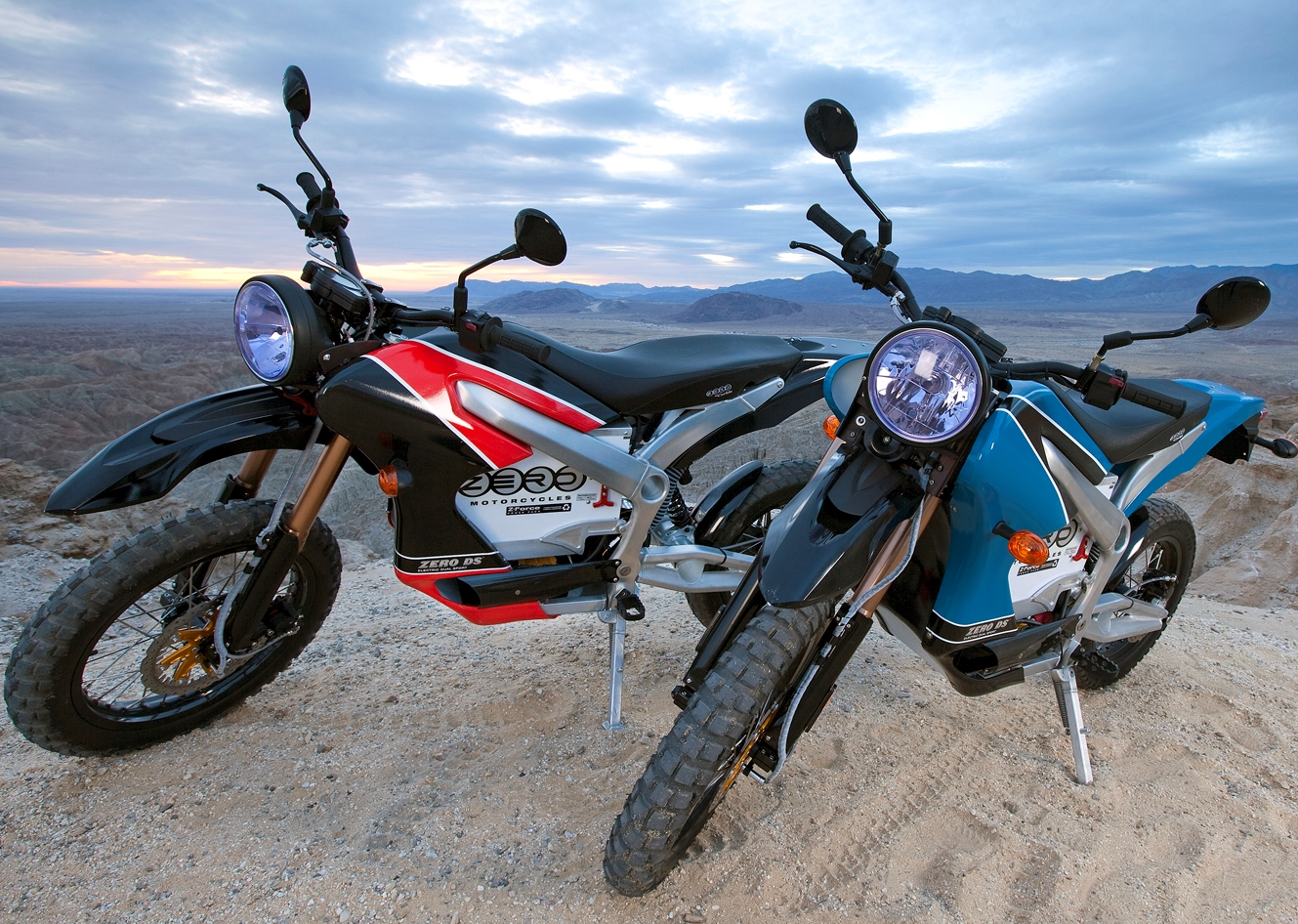
Zero DS 2009

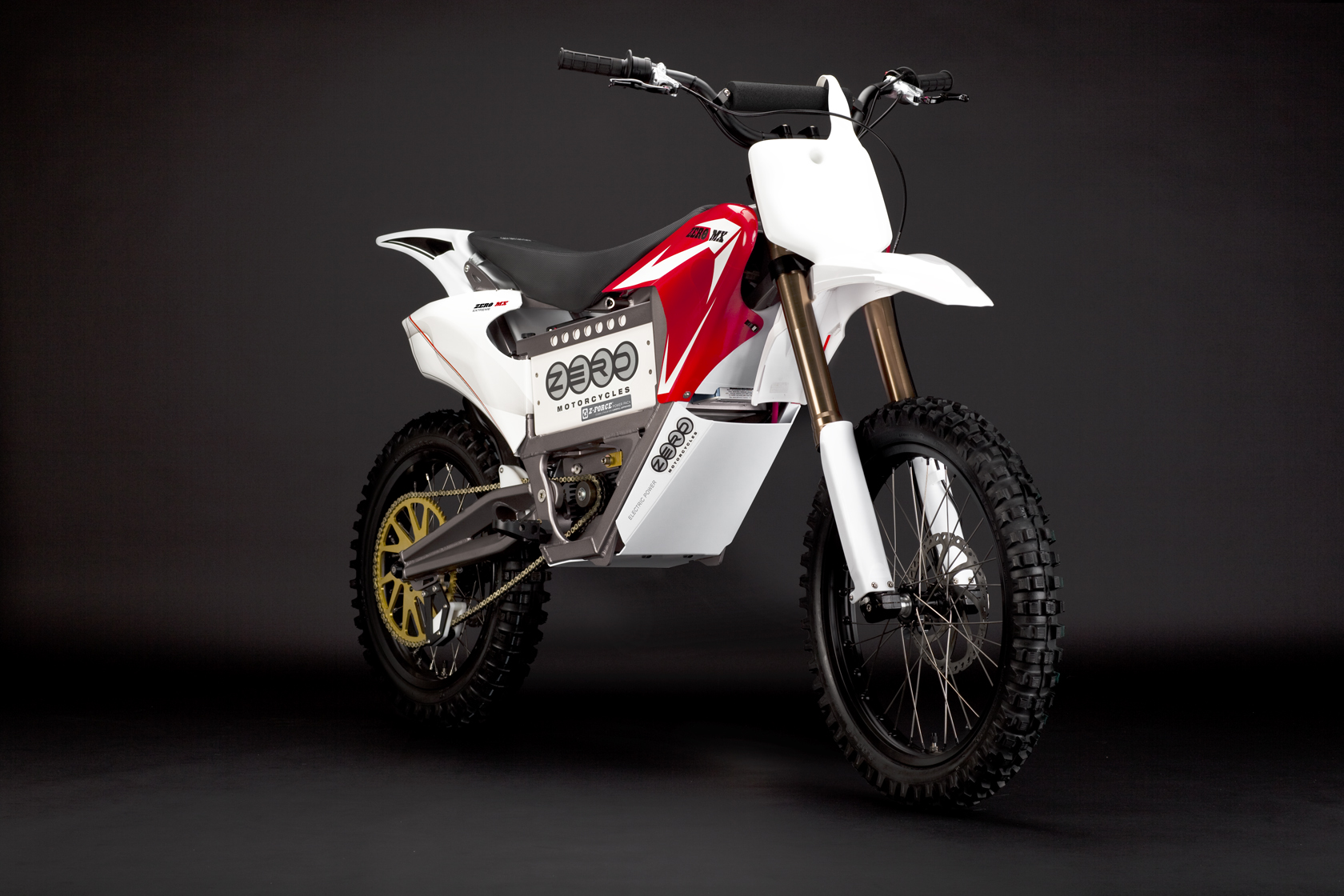
Zero MX 2009

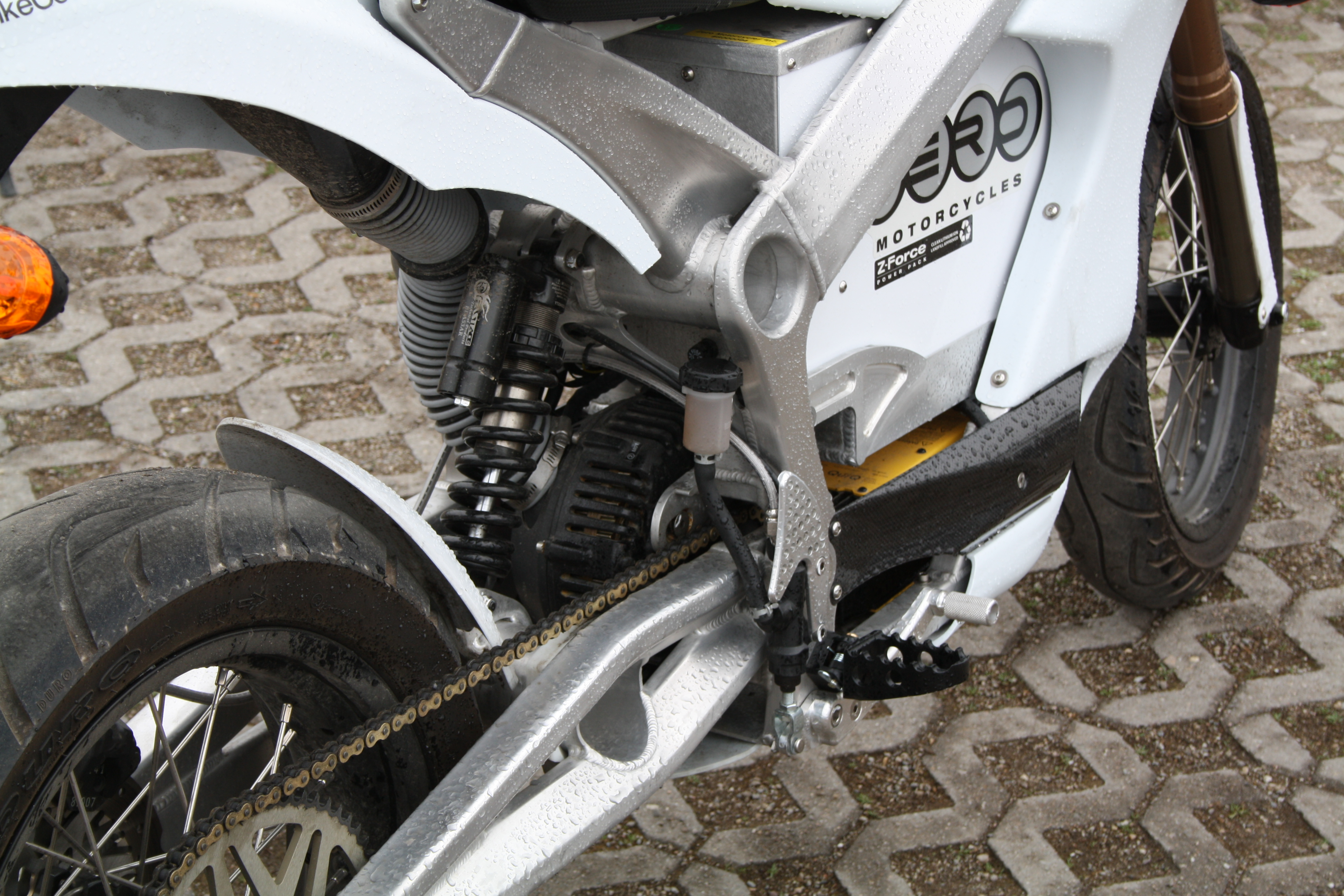
Z-Force electric motor and lithium-Ion battery in 2010

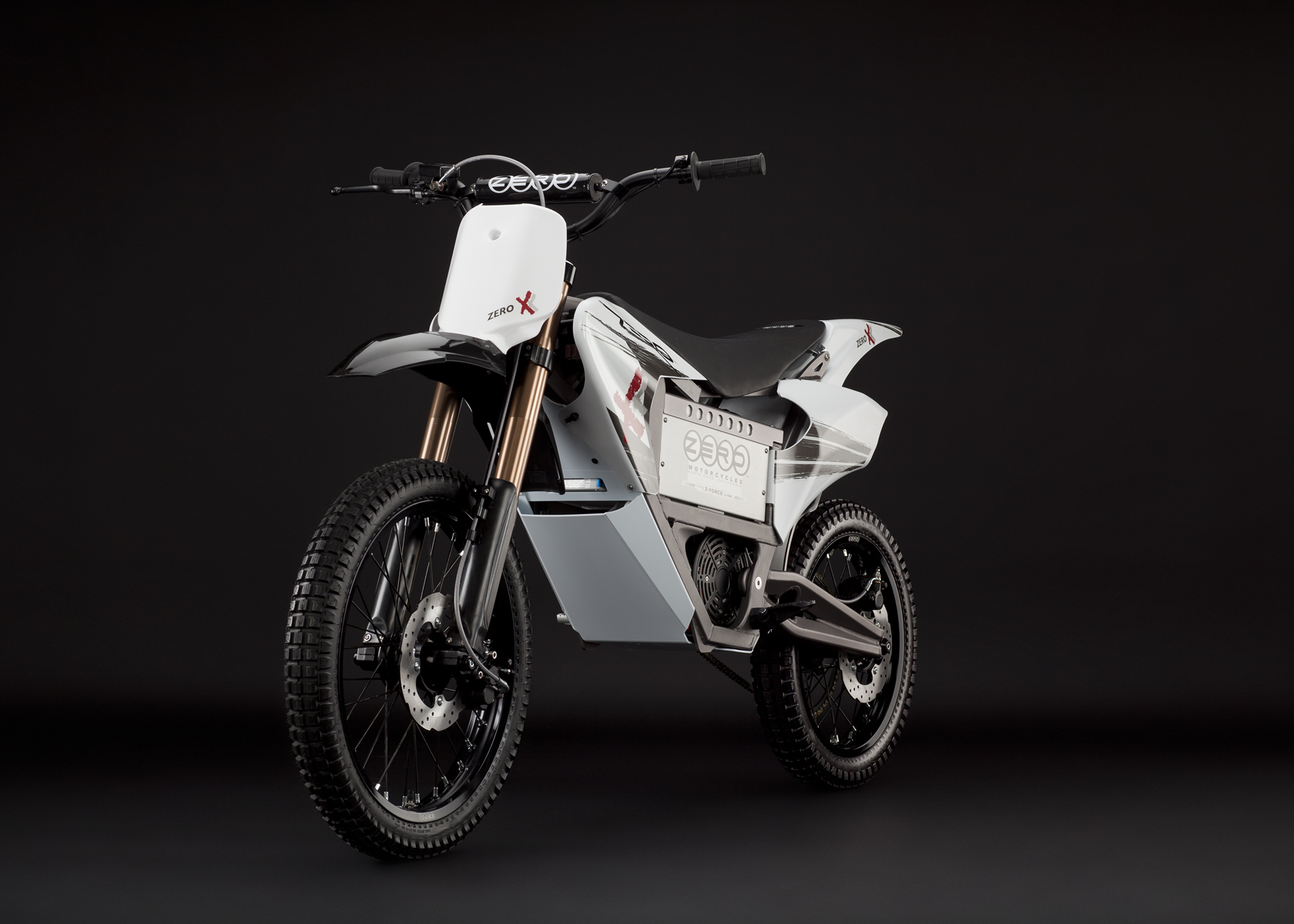
Zero X 2011

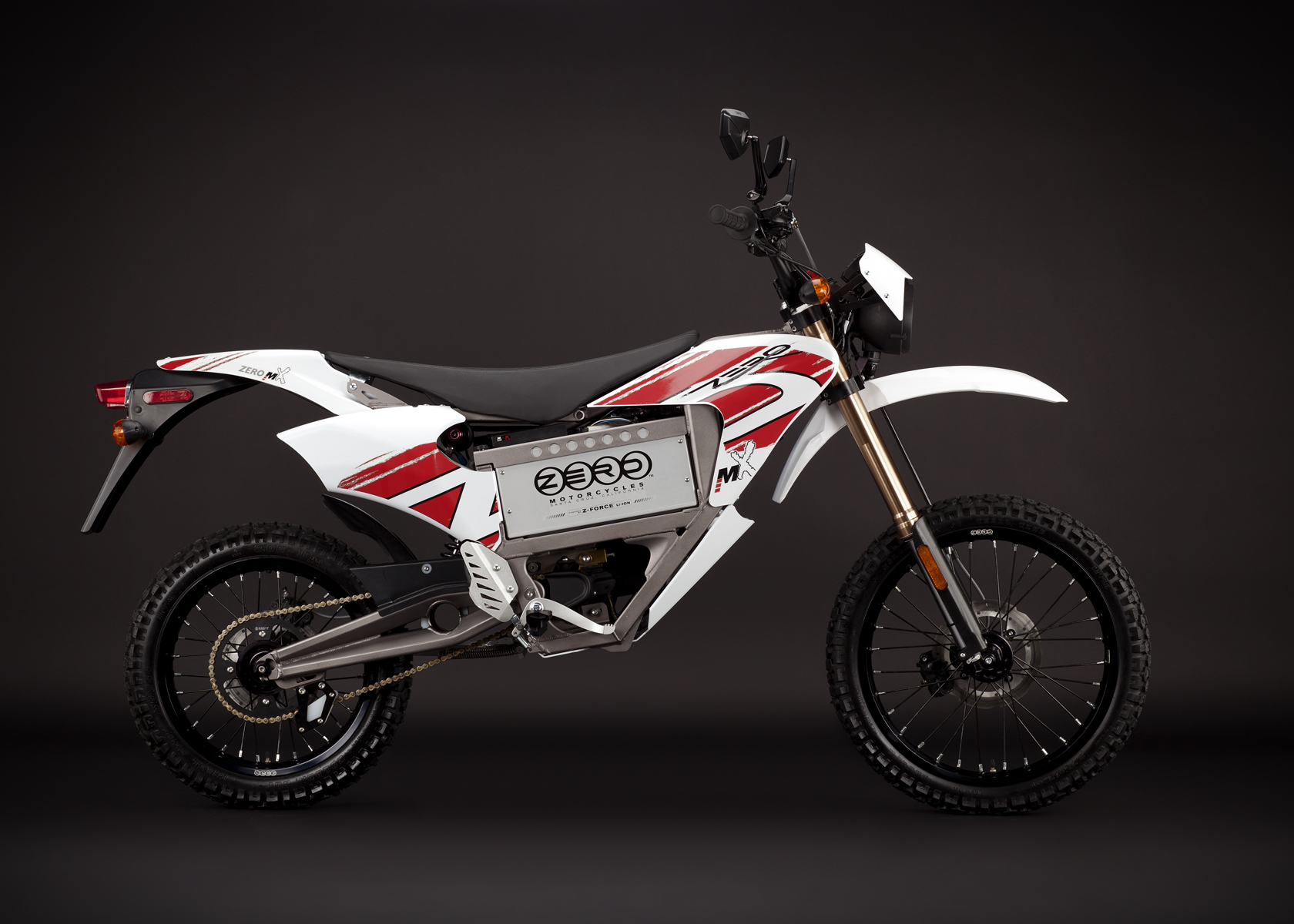
Zero MX 2011

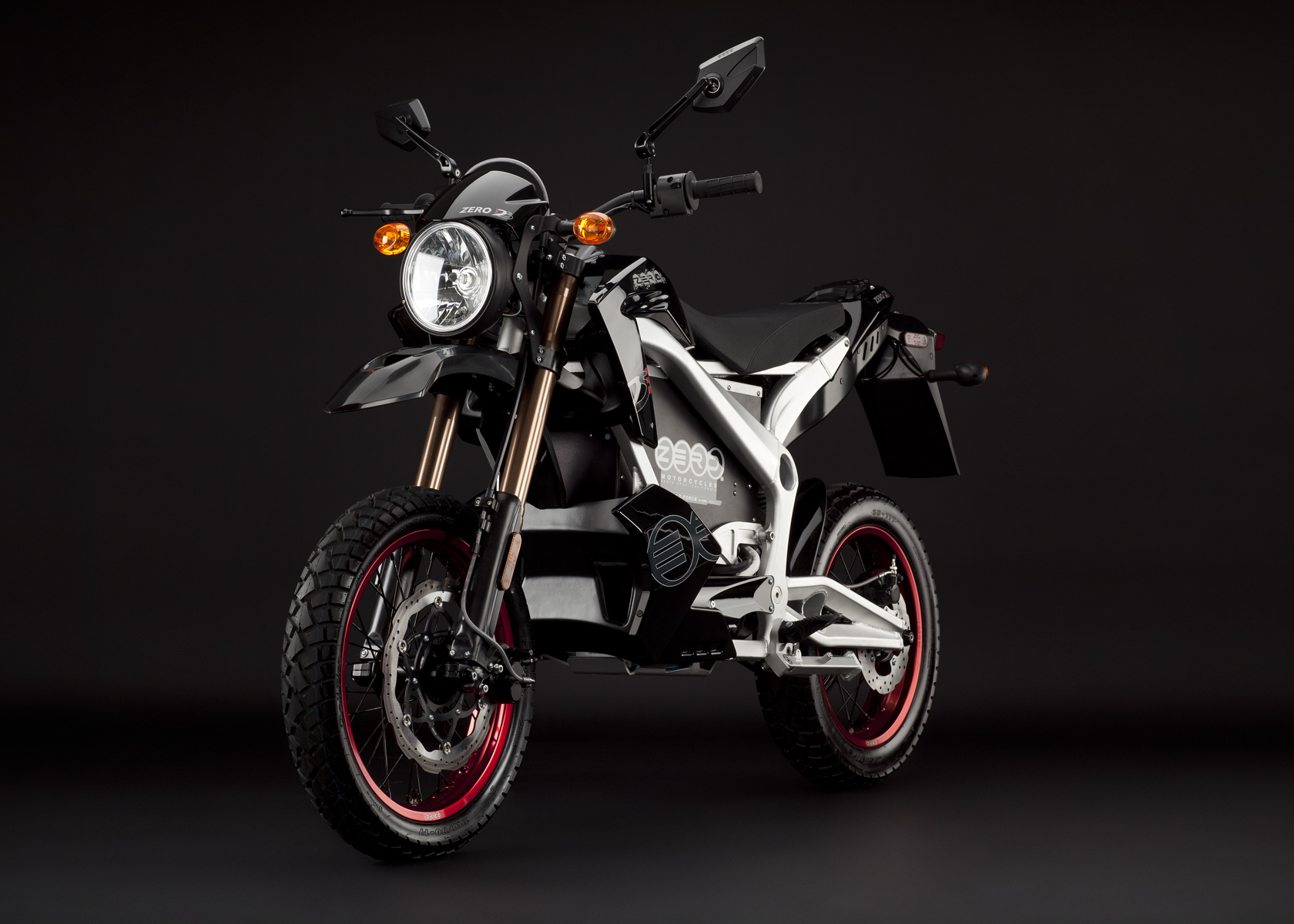
Zero DS 2011

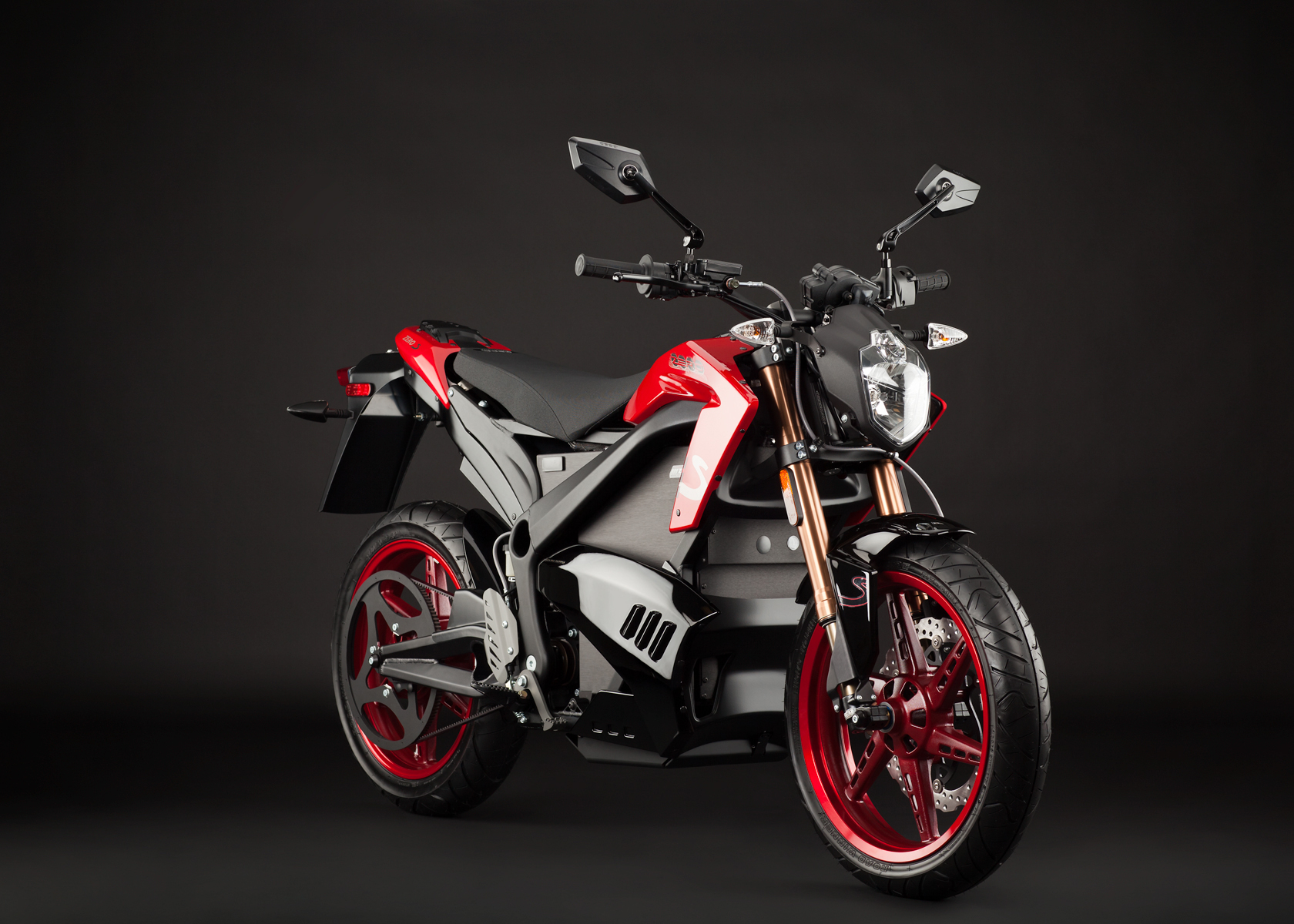
Zero S 2012

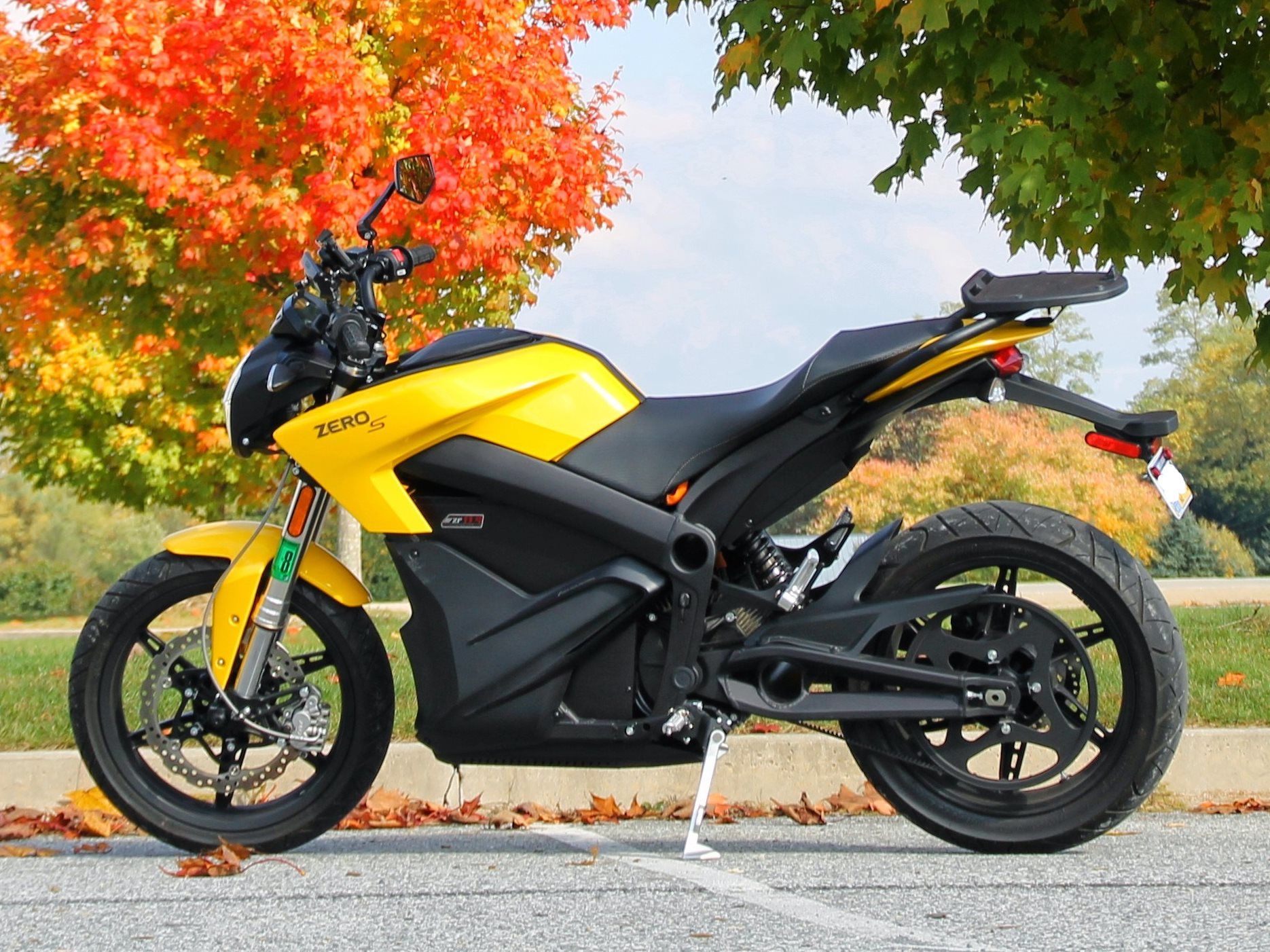
Zero S 2014

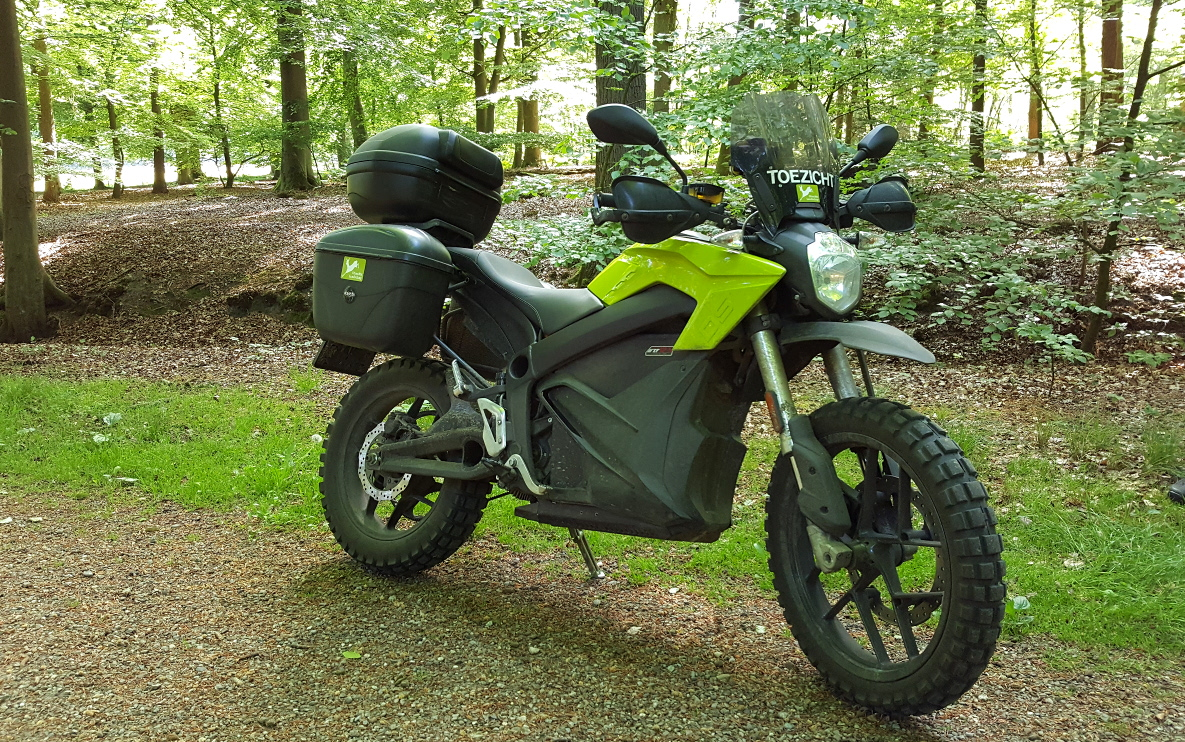
Zero DS ZF 2017

== Powertrain ==
Zero's Lithium-ion power packs and motors were developed in-house, and are branded under the names "Z-Force" and "ZF" (even though ZF is since 1915 the well-established abbreviation of ZF Friedrichshafen, a spin-off from Zeppelin that nowadays also offers electric drive-trains and motorcycle parts).

The Zero power packs use a cell configuration that operates at (nominally) 102 volts, which is well below the threshold of 200 V required for Combined Charging System (CCS) which is the most common DC fast charging standard, at least outside of Japan and China. Some electric motorcycle competitors like Energica and (Harley-Davidson) LiveWire offer CCS. In electric cars, 400 V are common, some new high performance vehicles use up to 924 V.

The motorcycles' propulsion is provided by a single electric, air-cooled, brushless, permanent-magnet 3-phase AC motor. The motor is coupled to the rear wheel by a belt or – optionally on the Zero FX – a chain. A controller manages the power delivery and comes in 420-amp, 550-amp, 660-amp, and 775-amp sizes depending on the year and model. Zero has made their electric powertrain systems available to commercial partners.

== Racing use ==
Zero Motorcycles has had success racing at Pikes Peak. Zero has won the production electric motorcycle class in 2013, 2014, and 2015. In 2014 a Zero FX was the first production electric motorcycle to break the 12 minute mark.

In 2012, Brandon Miller set a Bonneville Land Speed Record on a Zero S ZF6 model. He achieved an average speed of 101.652 mph over a one-mile course. This beat the previous record for modified production motorcycles weighing less than 150 kilograms by over 23 mph.

Zero Motorcycles hosted an endurance racing event for electric motorcycles on April 4–5, 2009, called the 24 Hours of Electricross. This event was the largest electric motorcycle race to date. The 10 teams competed on Zero X electric motocross bikes. Team HotChalk set a Guinness world record for the furthest distance traveled on an all-electric off-road motorcycle in 24 hours at just over 500 miles.

Racers have used Zero Motorcycles against gasoline motorcycles in a number of other forms of racing, including flat-track, hare scrambles, supermoto, and supercross.

== Competitors ==
Zero's main competitors were the now defunct Victory Empulse (formerly Brammo), and halted Alta Motors, but current and upcoming models from Evoke, Lightning, and Energica compete with Zero's product lineup. Some of the larger OEMs have also released electric motorcycles and prototypes such as the Harley-Davidson LiveWire motorcycle and Yamaha's PES2 and PED2 concepts.

== See also ==
- Zero S
- Energica Motor Company
- Harley-Davidson LiveWire
