= Mission Motors =

- Type: Private, venture funded
- Industry: Electric power train supply
- Founded: 2007
- Defunct: 2015
- Headquarters: San Francisco, California, United States
- Key people: Jit Bhattacharya, CEO; Edward West, President
- Products: Electric vehicle components
- Revenue: Undisclosed
- Number of employees: 35

Mission Motors was an American company founded in 2007 in San Francisco, California. The company was founded with the aim of creating high-performance, electric motorcycles, but later became a supplier of electric vehicle components.

== History ==
Mission Motors was founded by Mason Cabot, Forrest North and Edward West in 2007. The company was briefly known as Hum Cycles while it operated in stealth mode.

In February 2009, the company revealed the prototype for their first vehicle, the Mission One PLE (Premiere Limited Edition) at the TED conference. The all-electric motorcycle, styled by Yves Béhar, claimed a top speed of 150 miles per hour and a range 150 miles per charge. The company accepted reservations for the first 50 vehicles, originally scheduled to be delivered in 2010. Reservations required a $5,000 deposit, with a sales price of $68,995. Delivery of the Mission One PLE was delayed until Q2 2011 and eventually discontinued.

In February 2010, Forrest North, founder and CEO, stepped down.

In June 2010, Mission Motors secured $3.35MM in additional funding.

In November 2010, the company launched MissionEVT (Electric Vehicle Technology). The stated goal was to design and supply high-performance EV powertrains, including energy storage systems, drive systems and software, to the vehicle manufacturers, targeting a wide range of applications—including battery-electric, plug-in hybrid electric and hybrid-electric vehicles.

In December 2010, the company unveiled the Mission R electric motorcycle. The powertrain is of Mission's own design and features a 100 kW liquid-cooled 3-phase AC-Induction motor and 14kwh of batteries. The chassis was designed by James Parker and the bodywork was designed by Tim Prentice.

In August 2011 Mission Motors closed a $9 million Series B round led by private equity firm Warburg Pincus.

The battery-powered unit of Project LiveWire, Harley-Davidson's first electric motorcycle was developed with help from the company. The prototype is powered by a longitudinally-mounted electric motor rated at 74 hp and 52 lb-ft of torque, on par with H-D's 833 cc internal combustion engine. Mission Motors also developed electric powertrain technology for Caterpillar, Honda, and Mugen's electric Isle of Man TT racebike, the Mugen Shinden San.

The last Facebook post was on June 4, 2014, the company's website was last seen on Feb 20th 2015 and the phone is now disconnected.

Mission Motors ceased operations in 2015 after losing some of its employees to competitors like Apple.

In March 2020, electric motorcycle startup Damon Motorcycles announced that it had acquired the intellectual property of Mission Motors.

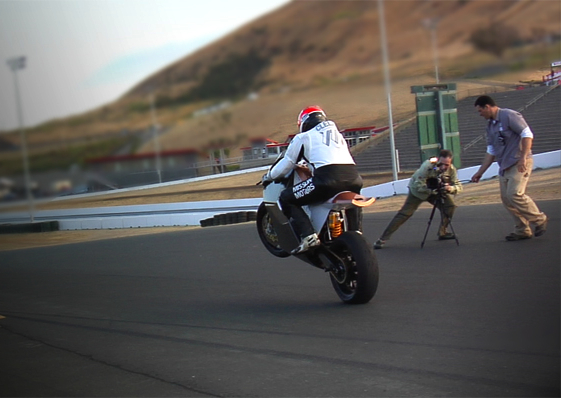
Mission One 2009

== Racing ==
Mission Motors had periodically competed in electric motorcycle racing events.

On June 12, 2009, US racer Thomas Montano rode the Mission One on the 37.733-mile (60.725 km) course of the TTXGP on the Isle of Man. The bike finished in 4th place in the PRO class, with an average speed of 74.091 mph and a lap time of 30 minutes 33.26 seconds.

In September 2009, Mission's Product Manager Jeremy Cleland broke the AMA electric motorcycle land speed record during the BUB Motorcycle Speed Trials at the Bonneville Salt Flats in Utah riding the Mission One. The bike registered a 150.059 mph average of a two way pass.

Mission Motors did not race in 2010 in order to focus on bringing the Mission One to market.

In June 2011, Steve Rapp rode the Mission R at the ReFuel time trials at Laguna Seca and set an electric motorcycle lap record of 1:43.7.

On July 24, 2011, Steve Rapp rode the Mission R at the joint FIM/TTXGP race at Laguna Seca to a first-place victory, with a margin of 39.995 seconds to second-place finisher MotoCyzsz. Rapp's qualifying time of 1:31.3 broke the previous Laguna Seca electric vehicle record by 7.5 seconds.

On July 11, 2012, Jim Higgins rode the street legal Mission R at the Sonoma Raceway 1/4 mile drag strip and set a National Electric Drag Racing Association (NEDRA) street legal electric motorcycle record for the SMC/A3 class with a time of 10.602 @ 122.57 mph.

On June 4, 2014, John McGuinness rode the Honda Shinden San for Team Mugen at the Isle of Man TT Zero race to shatter the lap record with a time of 19 min, 17.300 sec for an average speed of 117.366 mph. Mission Motors was a major sponsor and supplier of electric powertrain technology for Team Mugen.
