= Triumph Thunderbird (2009) =

British motorcycle

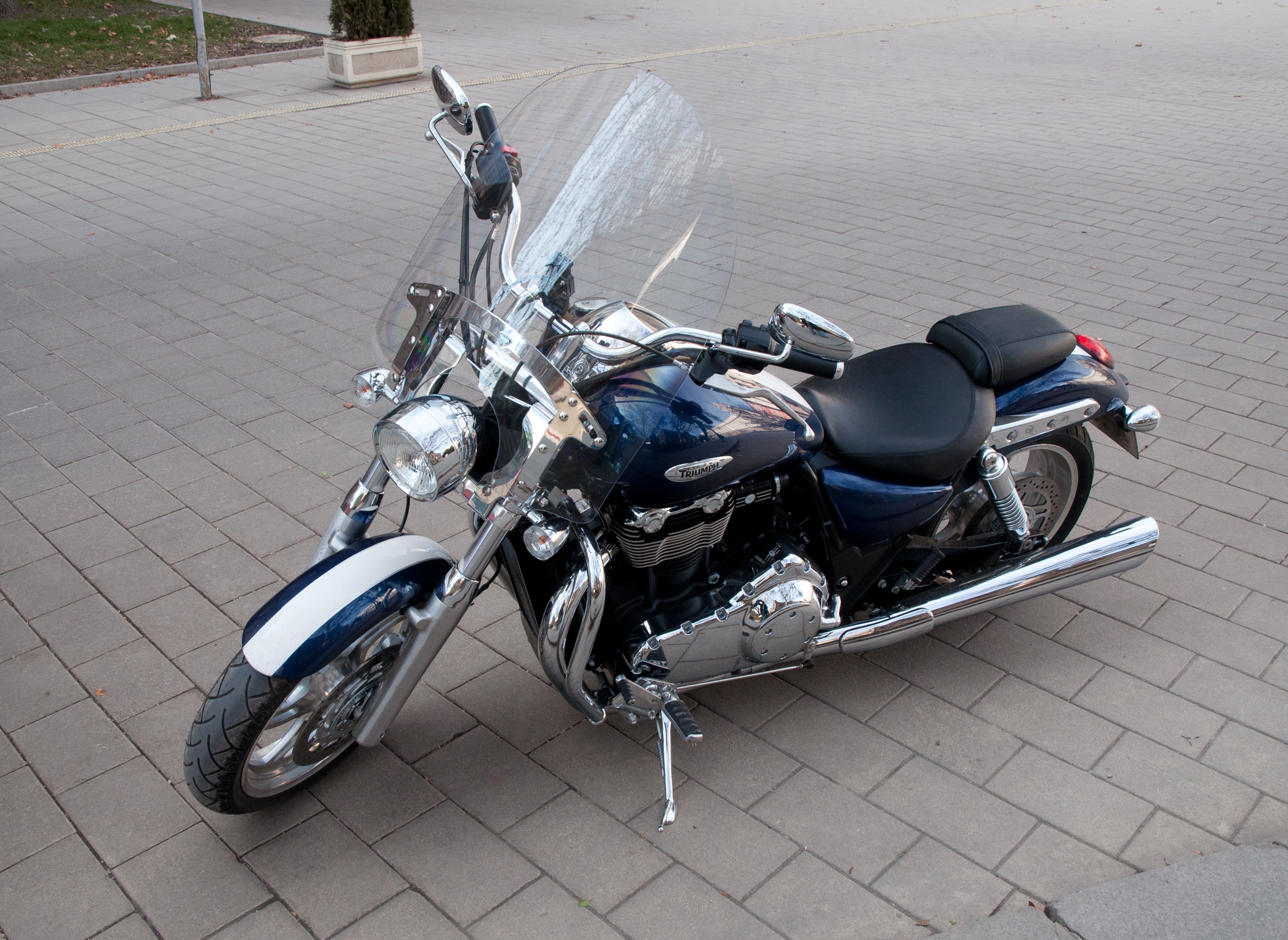
- 2010 Triumph Thunderbird
- Manufacturer: Triumph
- Production: 2009–
- Class: Cruiser
- Engine: 1,597 cc (97 cu in) or 1,699 cc (104 cu in) DOHC, 8-valve, four-stroke parallel-twin
- Bore / stroke: 1,600 cc: 103.8 mm × 94.3 mm (4.09 in × 3.71 in); 1,700 cc: 107.1 mm × 94.3 mm (4.22 in × 3.71 in)
- Power: 1,600 cc: 85 bhp (63 kW; 86 PS) @ 4,850 rpm 1,700 cc: Commander: 94 PS (93 bhp; 69 kW); Storm: 97 bhp (98 PS; 72 kW) @ 5,200 rpm
- Torque: 1,600 cc: 108 ft⋅lbf (146 N⋅m) @ 2,750 rpm 1,700 cc: Commander: 151 N⋅m (111 ft⋅lbf); Storm: 115 ft⋅lbf (156 N⋅m) @ 2,950 rpm
- Transmission: 6-speed belt drive
- Suspension: Front: 47 mm Showa forks Rear: Twin spring shock absorbers
- Brakes: Front: Twin 310 mm floating discs. Nissin 4-piston fixed callipers Rear: Single 310 mm fixed disc. Brembo 2-piston floating calliper Optional ABS
- Tyres: Front: 120/70 R19; Rear: 200/50 R17
- Wheelbase: 1,615 mm (63.6 in)
- Dimensions: L: 2,340 mm (92.1 in); W: 880 mm (34.6 in) (including handlebars); H: 1,120 mm (44.1 in)
- Seat height: 700 mm (27.6 in)
- Weight: 339 kg (747 lb) (wet)
- Fuel capacity: 22 L (4.8 imp gal; 5.8 US gal)

The 2009 and later Triumph Thunderbird is a series of large displacement straight-twin cruiser motorcycles, made by Triumph Motorcycles in Hinckley, England. Since 2016, the model is offered as a base 1.6 L (98 cu in) and as 1.7 L (104 cu in) 'Commander' and 'Storm' variants.

The 2009 "Thunderbird" revives the name after a five-year hiatus, from several prior "Thunderbird" Triumphs: a previous three-cylinder 885 cc bike, as well as a prior single carburettor version of the 650cc twin Bonneville, produced in the mid-1960s for police work. The latest earlier iteration was the Thunderbird Sport, last made in 2004.

== Design ==
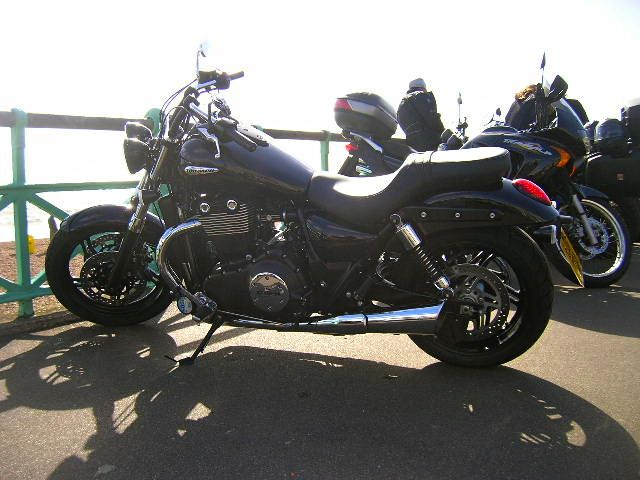
2011 Triumph Thunderbird Storm

The Thunderbird is a cruiser with a large 200/50 R17 rear tyre. Design was by Tim Prentice in California. The DOHC eight-valve parallel-twin engine has two balance shafts and a 270° crank, which imitates the sound and feel of a V-twin. The 1,597 cc (97.5 cu in) engine was originally intended to be modular, namely "two-thirds of" a Triumph Rocket III engine; but after four years of development, the only parts in common are the valves. Power output is 85 bhp (63 kW; 86 PS) and torque is 108 lb⋅ft (146 N⋅m). The engine has two spark plugs per cylinder, which gives better combustion, resulting in lower fuel consumption, cleaner exhaust emissions, and more power. Brakes are double front discs with four-piston callipers, with a single rear disc also with two-piston callipers (ABS as option). Final drive is via a belt drive.

In 2011, the Thunderbird Storm variant model was released featuring the previously optional 1,699 cc (103.7 cu in) engine fitted as standard, twin headlamps and with a number of black, rather than chrome parts

== Reception ==
A road test of the Thunderbird by Motorcycle News in May 2009, found that the motorcycle performed well, and handling and braking were significantly superior to comparable American or Japanese cruiser models. In 2009 and 2010, US motorcycle magazine Cycle World awarded the Thunderbird "Best Cruiser" in its annual "Ten Best Bikes" feature.

== Variants ==
- Triumph Thunderbird with 1,597 cc engine (since 2009)
- Triumph Thunderbird 'Storm', with 1,699 cc engine (since 2011)
- Triumph Thunderbird 'Commander', also with 1.7 l engine (since 2016)
