= Motorcycle Live =

British motorcycle show

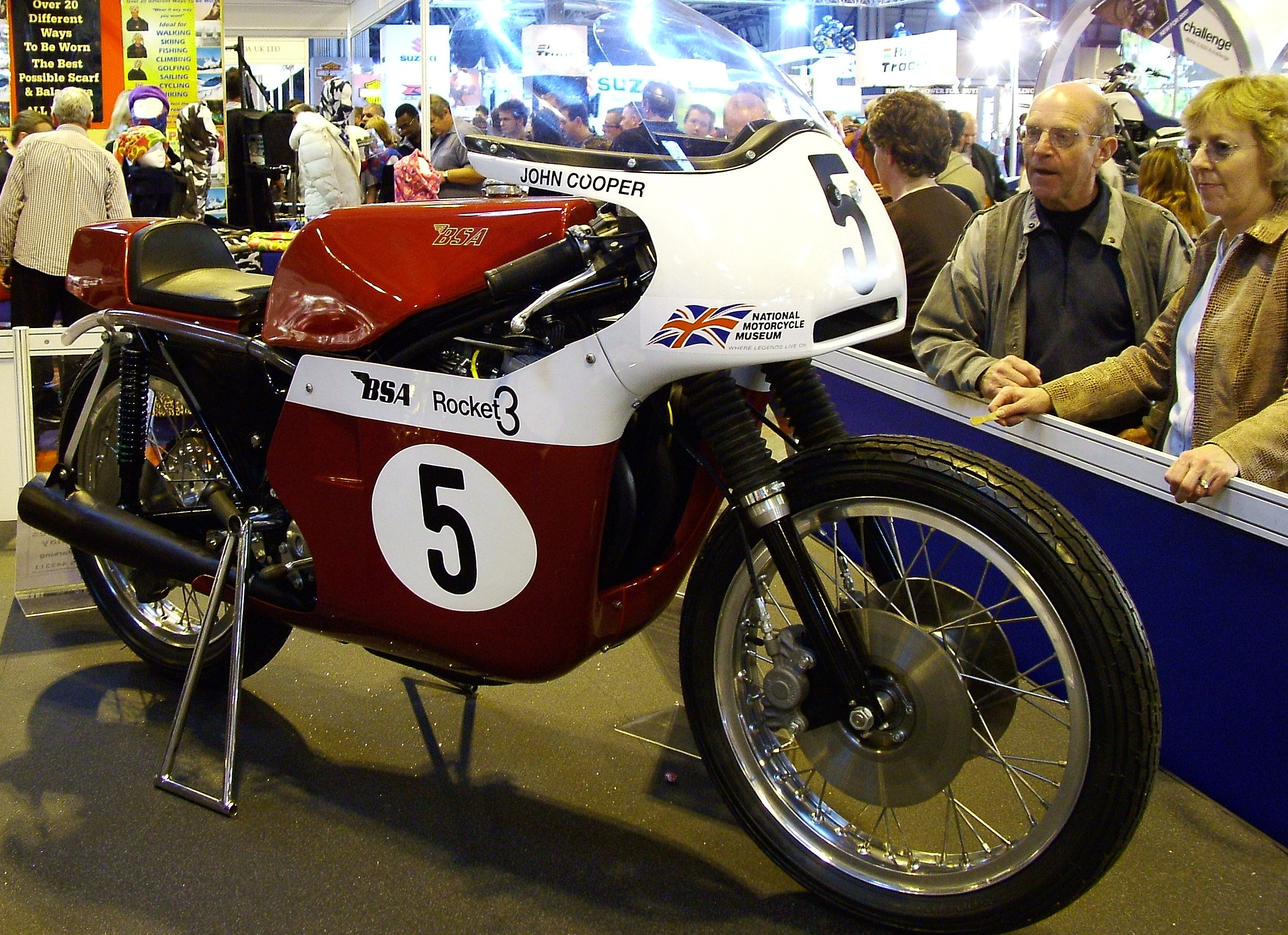
2006 NEC Motorcycle and Scooter Show

Motorcycle Live is an annual motorcycle and scooter show held at the National Exhibition Centre in Birmingham, England.

== History ==
The event first started in 1981 as the International Motorcycle and Scooter Show. In 2010 it was renamed Motorcycle Live.

Black Horse, a vehicle finance provider, is a sponsor of the Black Horse Stage.
