= Zero S =

Electric motorcycle

Zero S (ZF 7.2)
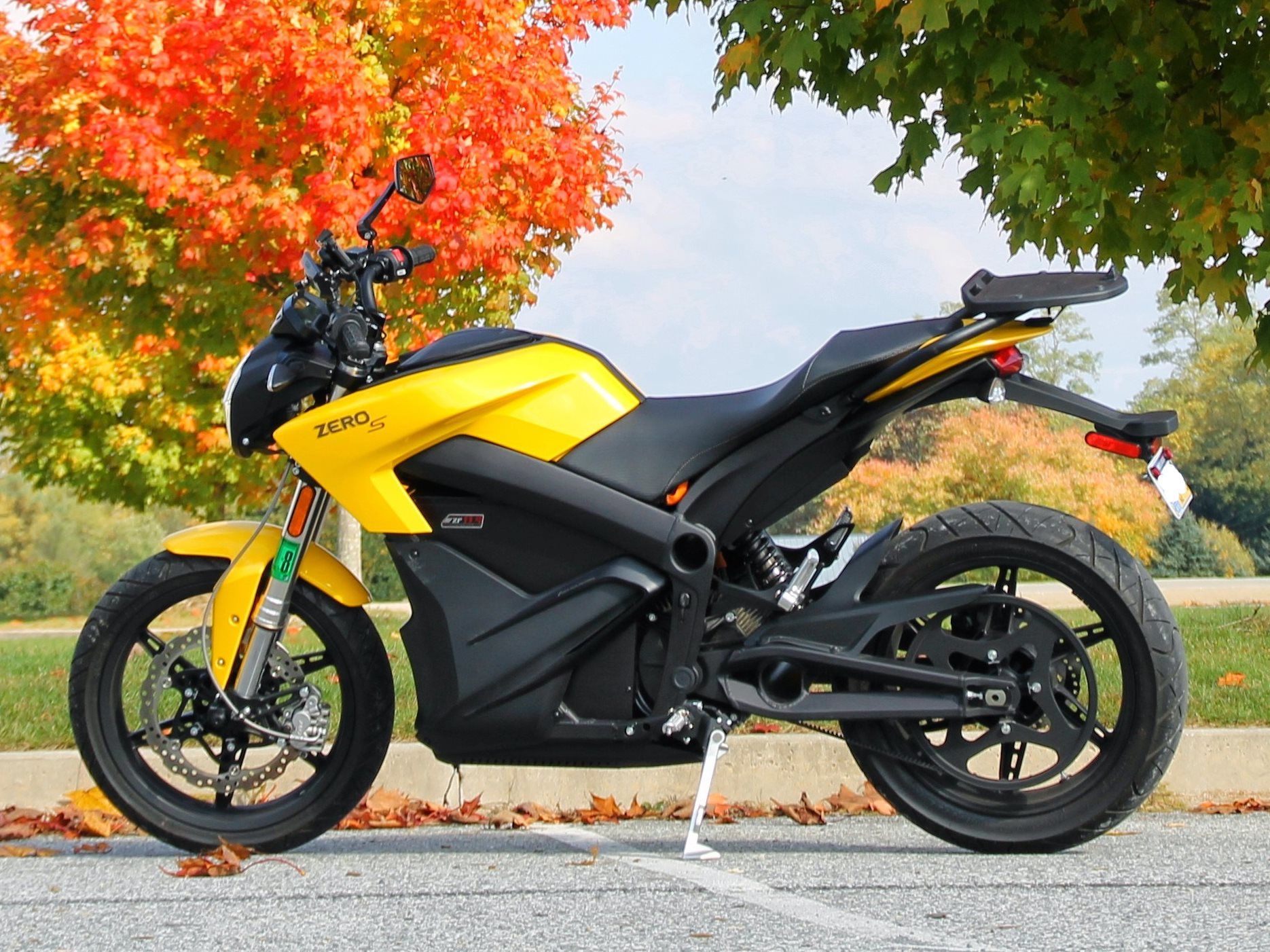
- 2014 model
- Manufacturer: Zero Motorcycles
- Production: 2009–present
- Class: Supermoto, Streetfighter
- Engine: 75-5 passively air-cooled, radial flux, interior permanent magnet, brushless electric motor
- Transmission: Clutchless Direct Drive 1-Speed Automatic
- Suspension: Front: Showa 41 mm inverted cartridge forks, with adjustable spring preload, compression and rebound damping Rear: Showa 40 mm piston, piggy-back reservoir shock with adjustable spring preload, compression and rebound damping
- Brakes: Bosch Gen 9 ABS, J-Juan Dual-Piston 320 mm × 5 mm disc & Bosch Gen 9 ABS, J-Juan Single-Piston 240 mm × 4.5 mm disc
- Tires: 110/70-17 / 140/70-17
- Wheelbase: 55.5 in (1,410 mm)
- Seat height: 31.8 in (810 mm)
- Weight: 313 lb (142 kg) (dry)

The Zero S is an electric motorcycle made by Zero Motorcycles.

On 23 April 2009 the company announced it would establish a distribution network in the Canadian market while getting regulatory approval for selling the motorcycle in Canada. It expected to start selling in Canada by early July 2009.

The 2009 Zero S had a claimed expected range of 81 km (50 mi) on a full charge, and an advertised top speed of 112 km/h (70 mph), Zero claims the motor is rated at 22 kW (30 hp). The battery can be recharged using standard 120 V or 240 V plugs.

Zero made minor changes and small battery improvements to the 2014 Zero S, and added ABS brakes to the 2015 model, and further battery improvements in 2016.
