= Zero X =

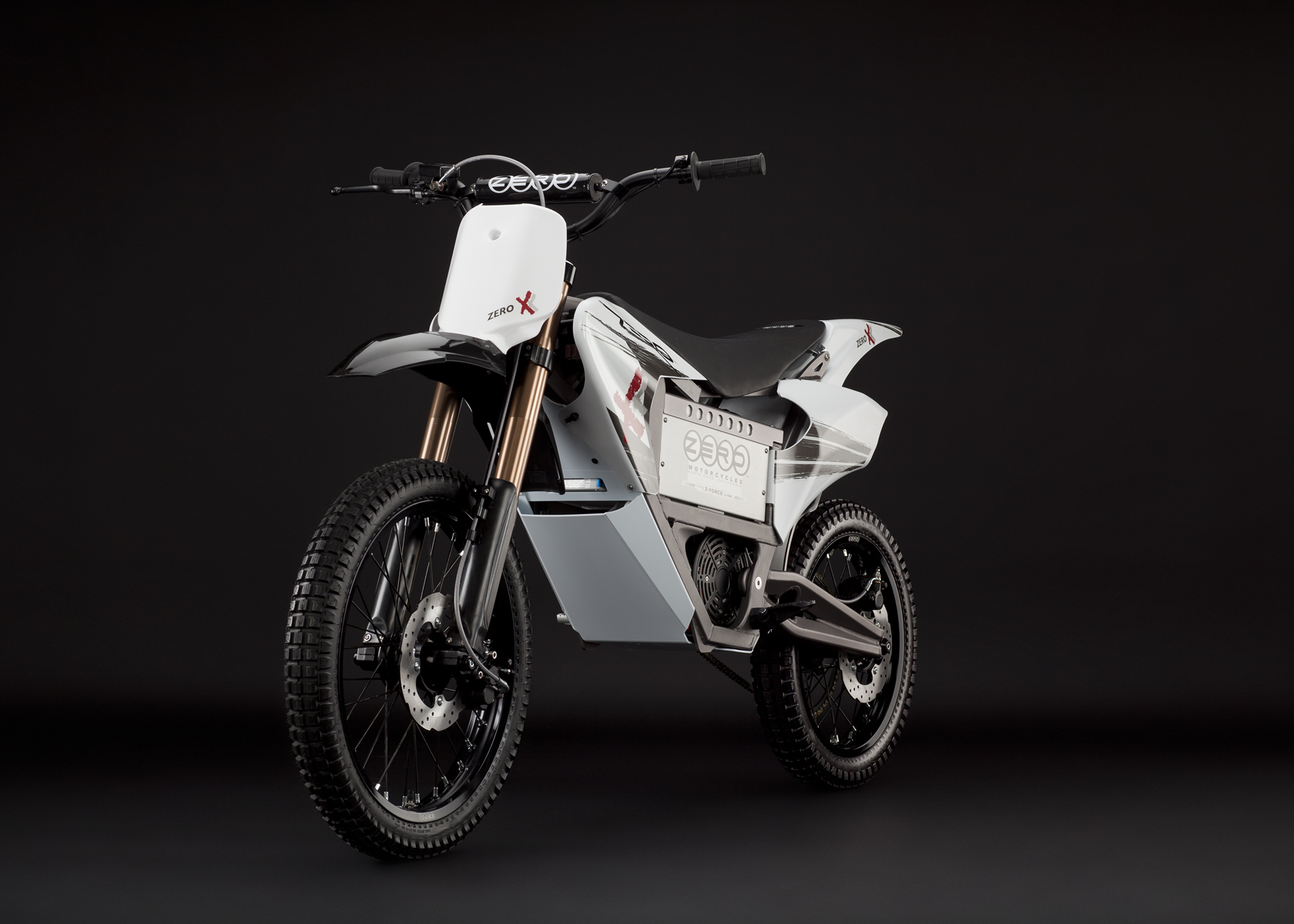
- Manufacturer: Zero Motorcycles
- Engine: Electric motor
- Top speed: 60 mph (97 km/h)
- Power: 17.4 kW (23.3 hp)
- Torque: 67.7 N⋅m (49.9 lbf⋅ft)
- Transmission: 1-speed
- Wheelbase: 54 in (1,400 mm)
- Seat height: 36 in (910 mm)
- Weight: 68.5 kg (151 lb) with battery (dry)
- Fuel capacity: 2 kWh (58 V @ 35 A·h)
- Range: 80 km/h (50 mph)

The Zero X is an electric motorcycle manufactured by Zero Motorcycles.

== Specifications ==
The wheels are driven by hardened steel 420 chain and direct drive gearing.

Braking is performed by six-piston calipers per axle, with a 9-inch (230 mm) front rotor.

It includes 17 by 2.5 in (432 by 64 mm) rear rim with 17 in × 3.5 in (432 mm × 89 mm) rear tire and 20 in × 3.0 in (508 mm × 76 mm) front tire.

Standard battery pack is made from lithium-ion, with rated range of up to two hours or 64 km (40 mi). Recharging is done using 120 V or 240 V with a charging time of two hours.

Other features include USB port that allow access to the bike's motor controls.

Extreme Package includes Higher Power Perm Motor with 10% more power over stock and faster top end speeds, customized stronger fork.

=== 2009 ===
Changes include improved chassis, which features hydroformed top tub, larger swing arms, thru-axle rear hub, shot-peened and anodized frame, organic frame gusseting, new number plate. As a result, it was 6 pounds (2.7 kg) heavier (now 151 lb or 68 kg) than 2008 model.

Prototype of 2009 model was unveiled in 2008 Alternative Energy and Transportation Expo in Santa Monica, California.

== Sales ==
On 24 September 2008, Zero Motorcycles announced all 2008 models had been sold out.
