= Tim Prentice (designer) =

American motorcycle designer (born 1964)

Tim Prentice (born c. 1964) is an American industrial designer and president of Motonium Design in California. Prentice holds a B.S. in industrial technology from California State University, Chico (1987) and is a graduate of Art Center College of Design's transportation program (1990). He has also been an instructor at Art Center for industrial design and illustration, as well as a guest lecturer at Stanford University.

Prentice was motorcycle designer of the 2009 Triumph Thunderbird motorcycle, Mission Motors' 2010 Mission R electric motorcycle, and the 2011 Triumph Speed Triple. Prentice and his firm won the Red Dot and Core77 industrial design awards in 2011 (respectively) for the Mission R.
