= Mitsubishi MiEV Evolution =

- 2014 Mitsubishi MiEV Evolution III Team Badge

Overview
- Manufacturer: Mitsubishi Motors
- Also called: MiEV Evolution III
- Production: 2014

Body and chassis
- Class: Sports car (S)

The Mitsubishi MiEV Evolution (with 'MiEV' an abbreviation of 'Mitsubishi innovative Electric Vehicle') is an electric motor racing car project, managed by Mitsubishi Motors. The project originated prior to 2012, producing a vehicle that entered in the 2012 Pikes Peak International Hill Climb (PPIHC) event, and has undergone evolution and technical improvements in subsequent years. The 2014 version (MiEV Evolution III) achieved 2nd and 3rd position overall in the 2014 PPIHC event, with run times within 3 seconds and 7 seconds (respectively) of the overall fastest vehicle, a gasoline-powered Norma race car.

== History ==
Mitsubishi Motor Company (MMC) formed the MiEV Evolution project in the run up to the 2012 race season. There were 2 stated aims; to promote the consumer i-MiEV electric car (which began to sell in North American markets in late 2011), and to participate in the PPIHC as a competitive event which has a long-standing tradition of experimental motor sports and is therefore a potentially suitable venue to test and improve the technologies of electric motor sports vehicles. Being a high altitude event (with the finish line around 14,000 feet), with diminishing oxygen levels in the upper stages which affects the efficiency of internal combustion engines, the Pikes Peak race venue is particularly favourable for electric power-train vehicles.

== Technology ==
For the initial 2012 PPIHC race, the team took existing powertrain components from the iMiEV production car, using 3 of the car's standard electric motors, retuned to rev to 11,000rpm and each producing a maximum of 107 bhp and 148 lb ft of torque for a total of 322 bhp and 443 lb ft of torque. One motor powered the front wheels, and the remaining two were harnessed in parallel to drive the rear wheels. The vehicle carries 35KWH of batteries and has a total weight (with driver) of 1400 kg - considerably more than its gasoline-powered competitors. The car's acceleration creates a 0-60 mph time of 3.8 seconds, and it has sufficient handling to achieve up to 1.3 lateral G in cornering. The top speed is 115 mph.

For the 2013 season, the team prepared a new vehicle, known as the MiEV Evolution II. With more time in hand, the team was able to implement more sophisticated drive control, allowing power to be directed to each wheel independently (instant torque vectoring), improving traction and handling. Total power was increased to 536 bhp and 885 lb ft of torque. The onboard energy storage was increased to 50KWH, and top speed increased to at least 140 mph. The design also featured improved aerodynamics, reduced weight, a lower centre of gravity due to repositioning the batteries, active yaw control, active stability control and a redesigned anti-lock braking system. The vehicle rides on Dunlop 260/660-18 tyres, and overall dimensions are Length x Width x Height (mm) - 4,870 x 1,900 x 1,390.

For the 2014 season, the team produced the MiEV Evolution III. Power was further increased, to 604 bhp, and the gearing ratio changed to improve acceleration out of corners. The battery remained at 50KWH, and redesign and use of different materials further reduced chassis weight. Wind tunnel work led to further downforce and aero-dynamic improvements, and the all-wheel traction control system was improved. The vehicle rides on wider Dunlop 330/680-18 tyres, and dimensions are Length x Width x Height 5,190mm×2,000mm×1,485mm, an increase over previous years. Without providing detailed data on the overall vehicle weight, Mitsubishi has confirmed that the MiEV Evolution III is lighter than the previous generations, i.e. under 1400 kg. For comparison, the 2013 winning unlimited class vehicle (Loeb's Peugeot) was 875 kg (with 875 bhp). Official technical details about the vehicles can be found via Mitsubishi's news website.

== Results ==
In the initial year of the project, 2012, with driver Hiroshi Masuoka, the team achieved a time of 10 minutes 30.850 seconds, placing 2nd in the electric vehicle class, some 15 seconds behind Toyota Motorsport's TMG EVP002 driven by Furnio Nutahara (10 minutes 15.380 seconds).

In the 2013 PPIHC event the team's MiEV Evolution II vehicles were driven by Hiroshi Masuoka and Greg Tracy and achieved times of 10:21.866 and 10:23.649 respectively, improving over the previous year despite encountering poor weather conditions. This put them around 35 seconds slower than the lead electric vehicle of Nobuhiro Tajima (09:46.530).

In the 2014 PPIHC event the team entered two MiEV Evolution III vehicles, again driven by Greg Tracy and Hiroshi Masuoka. Tracy placed 2nd overall, with a time of 9 minutes 8.188 seconds, fractionally behind the overall winning time of 9 minutes 5.801 seconds of Romain Dumas in the 2013 Norma. Masuoka placed 3rd overall with a time of 9 minutes 12.204 seconds. The team thus placed 1st and 2nd in the PPIHC Electric Modified class, breaking by 38 seconds the previous class record of 9 minutes 46.530 seconds which had been set by Nobuhiro Tajima in his E-RUNNER Pikes Peak Special in 2013. Tajima had a more modest improvement in 2014, finishing in 9 minutes 43.900 seconds in his Monster Sport vehicle. Tajima's team cited hotter than anticipated race conditions as partly responsible for the modest result, with the vehicle's onboard protection systems reducing power output to protect against overheating.

== Future ==
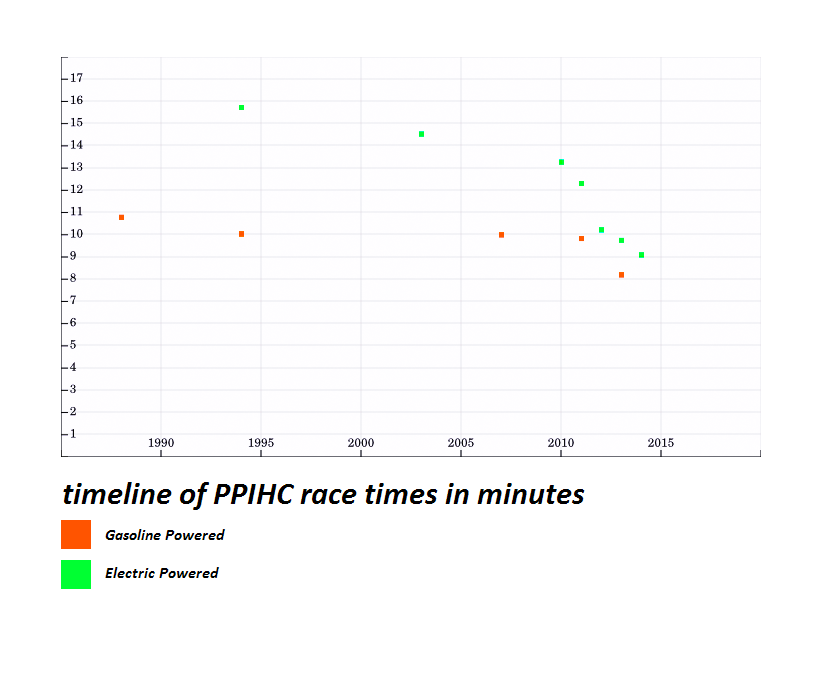

In the context of the PPIHC event, the results of recent years show that the relative improvements in race time are advancing at different rates in the electric vehicle class compared to the unlimited vehicle class (which typically uses internal combustion engine powertrains).

The unlimited class vehicles broke the 16 minute barrier in 1938, and have steadily improved over the subsequent decades, breaking the 10-minute barrier in 2011. Meanwhile, the electric vehicle class broke the 16 minute barrier in 1994, and the 10-minute barrier in 2013. The graph to the right shows the relative rates of improvement of the two classes since the 1980s.

Because the electric vehicle class continued to attract entrants like the MiEV Evolution team, and associated technology investment (in batteries, motors and control systems), this class did produce an outright winner in 2015, and may dominate thereafter. The weakest link for performance racing applications as of 2014 is typically the energy to weight ratio (WH/kg) of battery technology compared to gasoline. However, the technology is continuously improving in this respect.
