= Lightning Motorcycle =

Electric motorcycle manufacturer based in America

Lightning Motorcycles
- Industry: Vehicle Manufacturing
- Founded: San Carlos, California (2006)
- Founder: Richard Hatfield
- Headquarters: San Jose, California, United States
- Area served: North America
- Products: Lightning LS-218
- Website: lightningmotorcycle.com

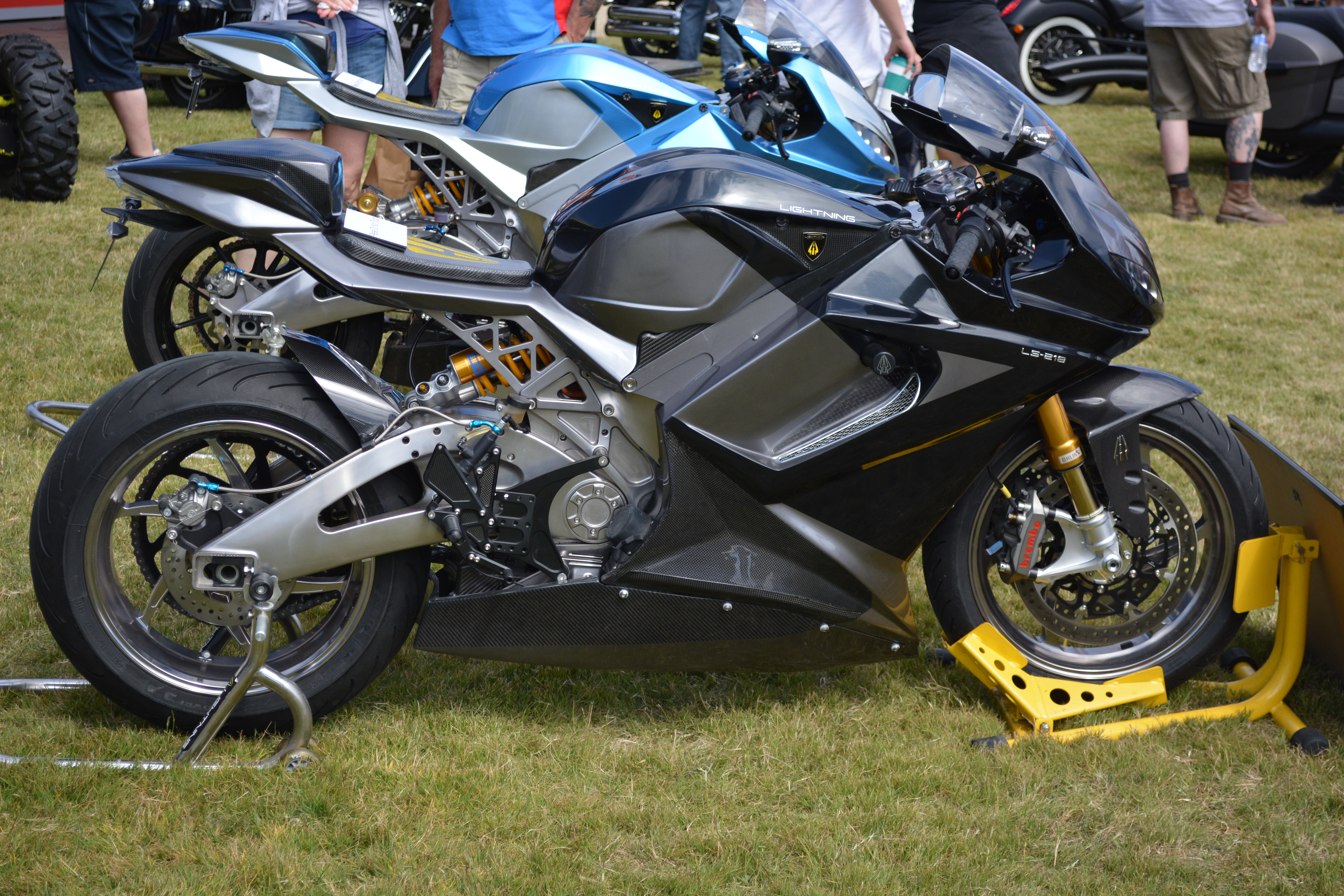
Lightning LS-218

Lightning Motorcycle Corp. is an American manufacturer of electric motorcycles. CEO and Founder Richard Hatfield started the company in 2006 in San Carlos, California.

Founder Hatfield looked to convert a motorbike to electric with lithium batteries after participating in an electric Porsche race team. Lightning Motorcycle then converted a former Yamaha R1 race bike to electric in 2006. The bike featured over 60 horsepower, about 70 pounds-feet of torque and a top speed of 100 mph.

In 2008, Lightning developed a lithium battery induction motor ATV to be used for military, border control, law enforcement, and search and rescue.

The Lightning Bike electric motorcycle set a new land speed record with an average of 173.388 mph at the BUB Motorcycle Speed Trials on the Bonneville Salt Flats. It later set a new record in 2012 with a 2 way average of 215.96 mph and a top speed of 218.96 mph in Bonneville. In 2012, the solar-powered Barracuda Lightning Bike won the joint eGrandPrix TTXGP and FIM ePower electric motorcycle racing series at the Mazda Raceway Laguna Seca with rider Michael Barnes.

Rider Carlin Dunne and Lightning's LS-218 Superbike won the motorcycle field at Pikes Peak in 2013, making it the first electric bike to beat out all its gas-powered counterparts. Richard Hatfield said about the Pikes Peak win, "It was great. The Lightning team and its sponsors did an incredible job bringing is all to its culmination of a goal we set ourselves fours years ago, to compete head to toe against the best gasoline powered vehicles in the world." With a top speed of 218 mph, the LS-218 has been named one of the fastest motorcycles in production.

In 2018 Lightning Motorcycles moved into its new corporate headquarters in San Jose, California. The new San Jose based facility is five times the square footage when compared to Lightning's previous San Carlos location. The new larger building has provided Lightning with the ability to dramatically expand production of the LS-218 Superbike, as well as an in-house design studio for designing future Lightning products, increased research and development capabilities and additional office space to accommodate the expanding Lightning team.

On January 17, 2019, Lightning Motorcycle teased their next bike, the Lightning Strike, claiming a top speed of 150 MPH, a top range of 150 miles, a 35-minute DC charge time, and a starting price of $12,998. It is scheduled to be released in March 2019.
