= Lightning LS-218 =

Electric motorcycle

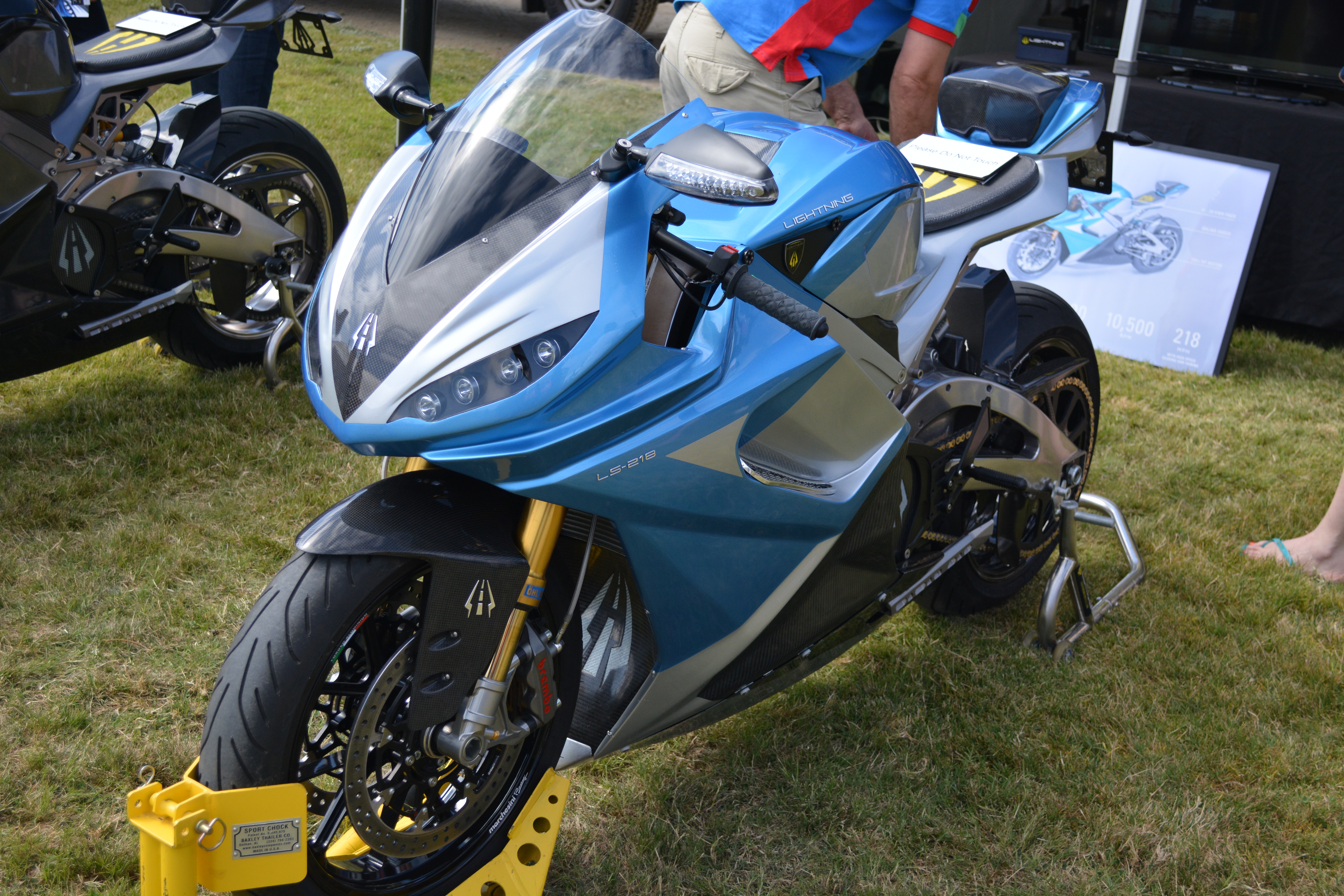
- Manufacturer: Lightning Motorcycle
- Production: 2014–
- Class: Electric sportbike
- Engine: Liquid-cooled 150 kW electric motor
- Top speed: 218 mph (351 km/h)
- Power: 200 hp (150 kW)
- Torque: 168 lb⋅ft (228 N⋅m)
- Transmission: Direct drive
- Weight: 496 lb (225 kg) (wet)

The Lightning LS-218 is an electric motorcycle engineered, designed and produced in America by Lightning Motorcycle, that has been in production since 2014. It has held the title of the world's fastest street-legal production electric motorcycle since 2014.

With a top speed of 218 mph (351 km/h), the production LS-218 is faster than any other street-legal electric motorcycle, and tops the list of fastest production motorcycles. While the 218 mph top speed of the LS-218 was arrived at through calculations of power and wind resistance, the speed was proven at Bonneville Speedway using an LS-218 modified from street-legal form, using "high speed gearing and fairing".

A race-modified LS-218 won the 2013 Pikes Peak International Hill Climb in open competition against both gasoline and electric motorcycles, ridden by professional racer Carlin Dunne. The Pikes Peak victory was historic as the first time an electric motorcycle beat internal-combustion rivals in a professional road race. The Lightning team's Pikes Peak race was conducted entirely off-grid, and relied on solar panels to charge the LS-218 racer, making it the first vehicle of any type to win a professional road race using solar power.

The LS-218's standard battery pack's capacity is 12 kWh (43 MJ). Adding a 20 kWh battery pack gives a range of 160–180 mi (260–290 km).

== See also ==
- List of motorcycles by type of engine
