= Environmentalism in motorsport =

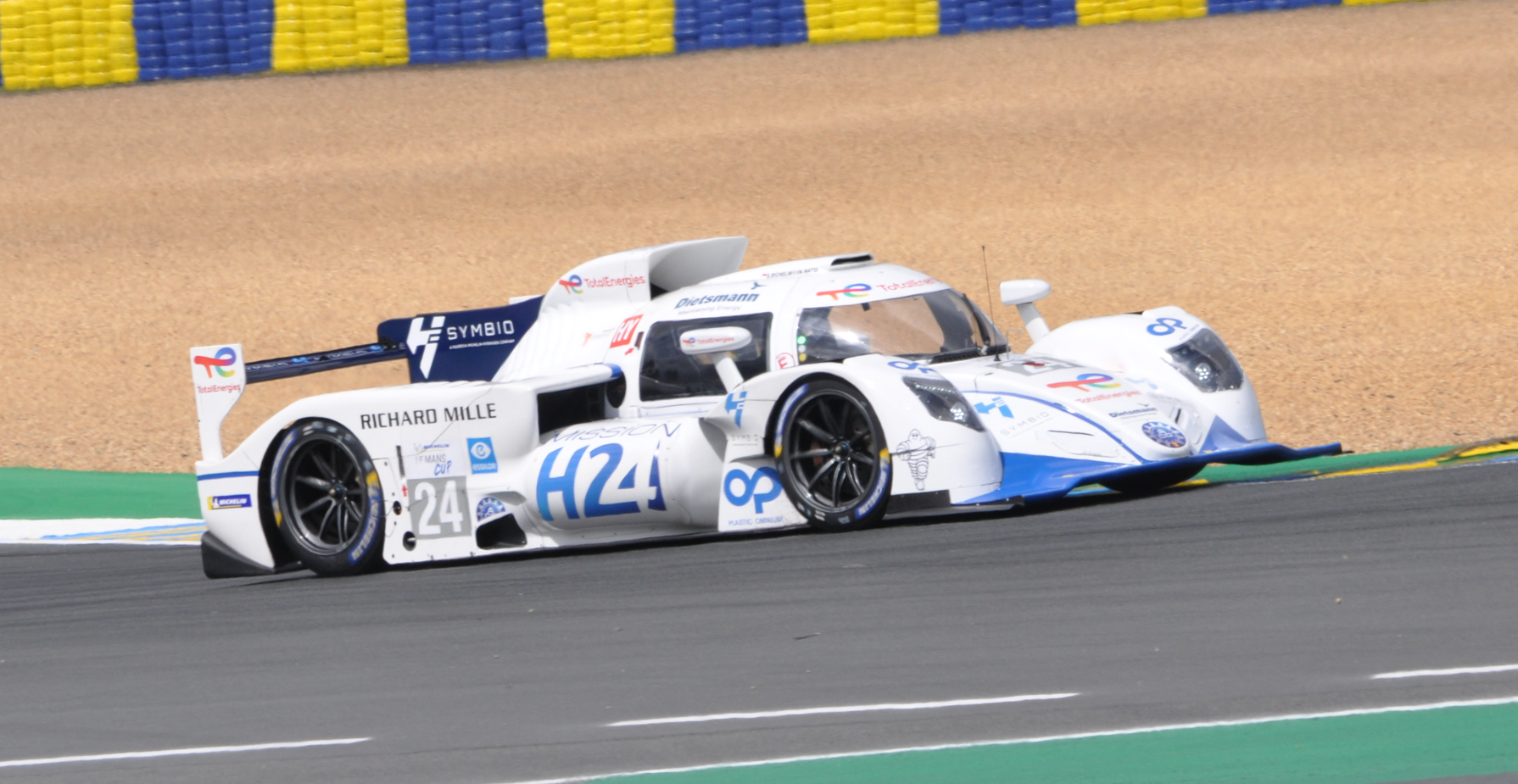
GreenGT H24, a hydrogen-powered racing car competing in the 2022 Road to Le Mans.

The issue of environmentalism in motorsport surrounds the whole of auto racing to reduce its carbon dioxide emissions contributing to global warming.

== Initial reception ==
The first series to respond to the call to make motorsport more environmentally friendly was the International Formula Master series, who planned to use a petrol–electric hybrid and regenerative braking systems in their cars for the 2007 season. A month later the series announces that it will not use the hybrid system for the 2007 season and instead opt for regular fuel. Meanwhile, Audi's diesel-powered R10 had won the American Le Mans Series by a margin of almost 100 points from their nearest rivals. In the United Kingdom, British Touring Car Championship team West Surrey Racing (WSR) ran Rob Collard and Colin Turkington in Ethanol fueled MG ZSs.

== New championships ==
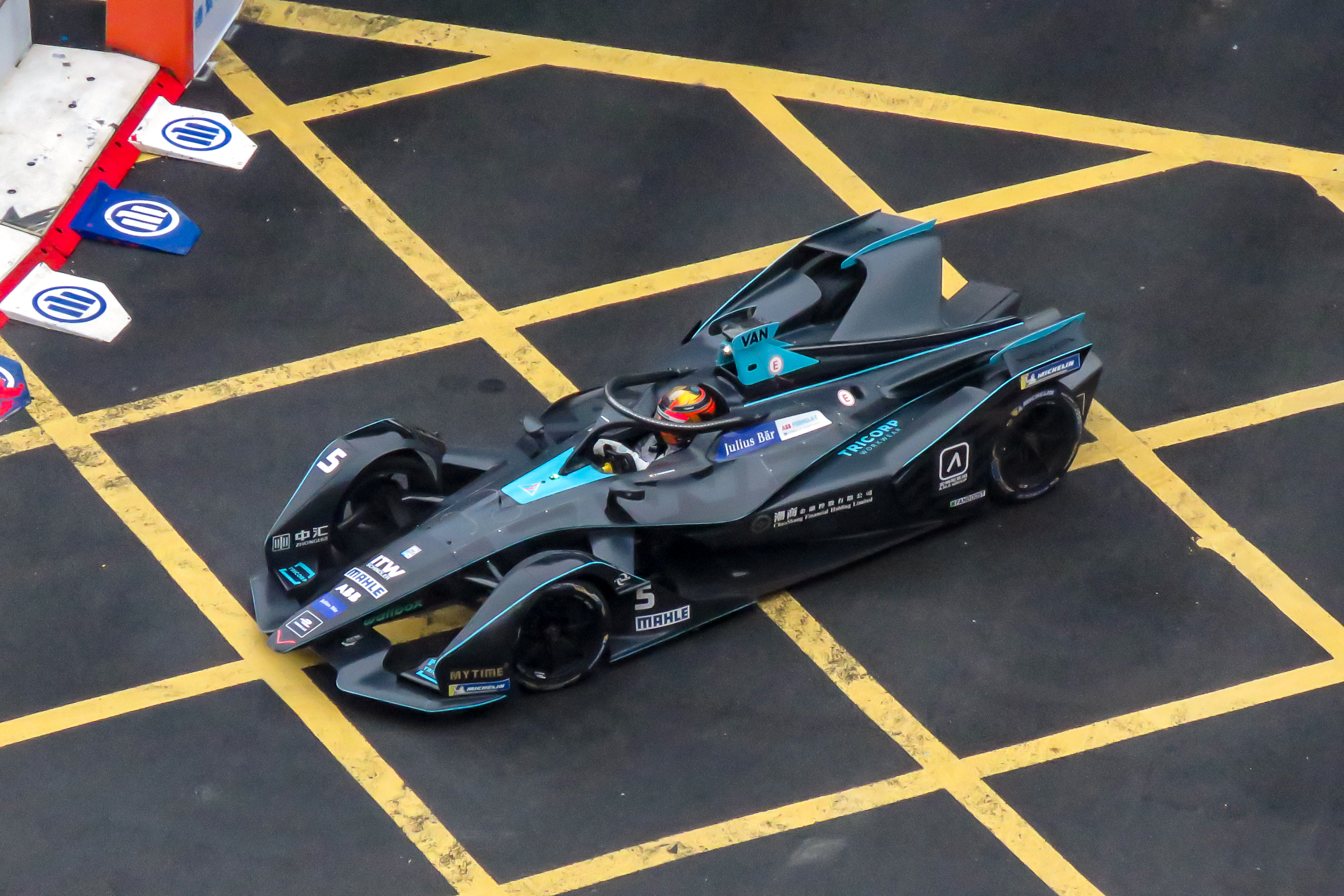
Stoffel Vandoorne driving a Gen2 Formula E car at the 2019 Hong Kong ePrix.

=== Formula E ===
In 2012, the Fédération Internationale de l'Automobile (FIA) announced that they would be the governing body for a new fully electric single seater championship. The series would be known as the FIA Formula E Championship and began in September 2014. In 2018, the second generation of Formula E cars was used for the first time, at the start of the 2018–19 Formula E season. The series is participated in by multiple manufacturers, including Jaguar, Audi, Nissan, BMW and Mahindra.

=== Extreme E ===
Extreme E is an international off-road racing series with environmentalism at its forefront. The series sees drivers race the all electric SUV Spark Odyssey 21 in remote locations specifically chosen to highlight climate change, while adopting legacy projects that provide environmental and social support. To reduce the carbon emissions associated with air freight, the RMS St Helena was purchased and refitted, enabling her to transport all equipment and cars to each location. Additionally, the St Helena houses a laboratory, allowing for climate science research to be conducted en route.

== Actions taken in other series ==
=== Formula One ===
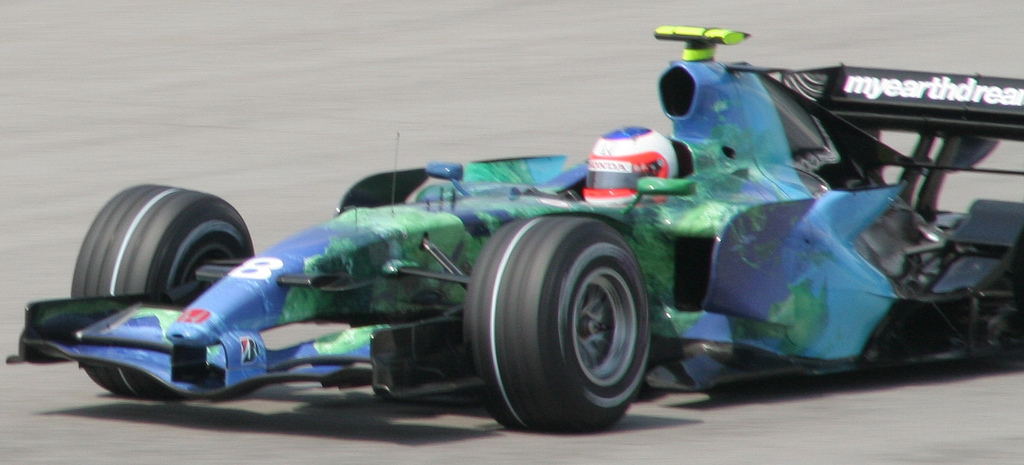
Rubens Barrichello driving the RA107 at the 2007 Malaysian Grand Prix, with its characteristic "Earth" livery.

Formula One's governing body, the FIA, took until May 2007 to act upon the issue of environmental effects the sport was responsible for by holding a discussion in Monaco during the Grand Prix. The Honda Works Team however, announced that they would run a sponsorless car for the 2007 season three months prior to the FIA's Monaco discussion. The Honda RA107 took on a livery that depicts the Earth, symbolizing Honda's environmental desires, with only the logos of Type R Honda 'H' and the Bridgestone logo.

The car mostly received a cynical reception, Red Bull Racing's Mark Webber observed that "it's good Honda is going green - but there are still 35 private jets parked 20 Kilometres down the road." Briggs commented that "Honda's 'Earth Car' may have attracted cynicism, but the issues it highlights are moving up motorsport's agenda."

In 2013, the FIA made plans to switch from V8 engines to turbo charged V6 engines, after the previous downgrade from V10 engines to V8 engines in 2006.

In 2009, the sport introduced kinetic energy recovery. Following a brief ban, these systems were reintroduced in 2011, these technical regulations were further revised for 2014 (see above).

=== North American motorsport ===
IndyCar was the first major open wheel series to reduce its green house gases by changing its fuel supply from methanol to more environmentally friendly ethanol fuel for the 2007 season.

=== Sportscar racing ===
Both the Le Mans Series and American Le Mans Series have made some effort to be more environmentally friendly. Both Audi and Peugeot have made diesel race cars, the R10 TDI and 908 HDi FAP respectively, for their series. Both also competed in the 2007 24 Hours of Le Mans where both cars competed for the win which resulted in the German manufacturer coming out on top.

In the British GT Championship, a diesel-powered Aston Martin DBRS9 made series history by winning at the Snetterton round.

Since 2011 (Audi and Toyota in 2012, Porsche in 2014, then by Nissan at Le Mans in 2014), the top class of sports car racing, LMP1, has seen hybrid powertrains.

In 2012, Drayson Racing introduced the Lola B12 69/E: a modified a Lola prototype chassis, and set a world record for electric cars in 2013.

In 2019, ACO has announced Mission H24 to bring hydrogen-powered racing car to 24 Hours of Le Mans in 2024.

The Volkswagen I.D. R has set various records from 2018 to 2020.

=== Touring car and European open wheel racing ===
As well as WSR's efforts, Paul O'Neill also entered a privateer entry in the BTCC, racing a bioethanol-powered Vauxhall Astra at the Brands Hatch meeting of the 2006 season. Soon, environmentally friendly entrants span to the World Championship stage with Alfa Romeo unveiling a diesel-powered entry for the 2007 season, which would make them the first manufacturer to enter a diesel-powered car in the World Championship. In April 2007, Swede Robert Dahlgren won the opening round of the Swedish Touring Car Championship in a bioethanol-powered Volvo S60.

European open wheel championships also made efforts to go greener, the British Formula Ford championship considered changing to bioethanol fuel for the 2007 season in December 2006 although three months later the series moved the plans to the 2008 season. In July 2007, the World Series by Renault became the first major European open wheel series to announce a move to biofuel, the new car will be used for the 2008 season.

== See also ==
- KERS
- Formula Zero
- FIA Formula E Championship
- TT Zero
- TTXGP
- FIM MotoE
