= Ultra-Lightweight TT =

The Ultra-Lightweight TT was a motorcycle road race that took place during the Isle of Man TT festival, an annual event at the end of May and beginning of June. Between 1951 and 1974 this race was part of the Grand Prix motorcycle racing season at world-level, representing the British round. The Ultra-Lightweight TT and the Lightweight TT races were both dropped from the 2005 Isle of Man TT race calendar due to lack of entries, but were later reinstated to the 2008 and 2009 TT race schedules held on the 4.25 mi (6.84 km) Billown Circuit.

== Engine Capacity ==
The 1924 Isle of Man TT was the first race for Ultra-Lightweight motorcycles not exceeding 175 cc engine capacity, won by Jack Porter, on a New Imperial at an average speed of 51.21 mph (82.41 km/h) for three laps of the Snaefell mountain course. The Ultra-Lightweight TT race was re-introduced for the 1951 Isle of Man TT race for motorcycles not exceeding 125 cc engine capacity until dropped from the TT race meeting in 1974. The Ultra-Lightweight race was re-introduced for the 1989 TT races, again for motorcycles not exceeding 125 cc engine capacity and was part of the TT Festival until 2004.

- 1924-1925 For motor-cycles not exceeding 175 cc engine capacity.
- 1951-1953 World Championship event for motorcycles not exceeding 125 cc engine capacity, held on the Snaefell mountain course.
- 1954-1959 World Championship event for motorcycles not exceeding 125 cc engine capacity, held on the Clypse Course.
- 1960-1974 World Championship event for motor-cycles not exceeding 125 cc engine capacity, held on the Mountain Course.
- 1989-2004 for motorcycles not exceeding 125 cc engine capacity, held on the Mountain Course.
- 2008-2009 for motorcycles not exceeding 125 cc engine capacity, held on the Billown Circuit.
- 1962-1968 Additional World Championship event for motorcycles not exceeding 50 cc engine capacity, held on the Mountain Course.

== Speed and Lap Records ==
The lap record for the Ultra-Lightweight TT is 19 minutes and 18.2 seconds at an average speed of 110.52 mph (177.86 km/h) set by Chris Palmer during the 2004 Ultra-Lightweight 125 cc TT Race.

== List of Ultra-Lightweight TT Winners ==
Year	Rider	Manufacturer	Average Race Speed
1924	(Scotland) Jock Porter	New Gerrard	51.21 mph
1925	(England) Wal Handley	Rex-Acme	53.45 mph
1926-1950	Not Held		
1951	(Northern Ireland) Cromie McCandless	Mondial	74.85 mph
1952	(England) Cecil Sandford	MV Agusta	75.54 mph
1953	(England) Leslie Graham	MV Agusta	77.79 mph
1954	(Austria) Rupert Hollaus	NSU	69.52 mph
1955	(Italy) Carlo Ubbiali	MV Agusta	69.67 mph
1956	(Italy) Carlo Ubbiali	MV Agusta	69.13 mph
1957	(Italy) Tarquinio Provini	Mondial	73.69 mph
1958	(Italy) Carlo Ubbiali	MV Agusta	72.86 mph
1959	(Italy) Tarquinio Provini	MV Agusta	74.06 mph
1960	(Italy) Carlo Ubbiali	MV Agusta	85.61 mph
1961	(England) Mike Hailwood	Honda	88.23 mph
1962	(Switzerland) Luigi Taveri	Honda	89.88 mph
1963	(New Zealand) Hugh Anderson	Suzuki	89.27 mph
1964	(Switzerland) Luigi Taveri	Honda	92.14 mph
1965	(England) Phil Read	Yamaha	94.28 mph
1966	(England) Bill Ivy	Yamaha	97.66 mph
1967	(England) Phil Read	Yamaha	97.48 mph
1968	(England) Phil Read	Yamaha	99.12 mph
1969	(England) Dave Simmonds	Kawasaki	91.08 mph
1970	(Germany) Dieter Braun	Suzuki	89.27 mph
1971	(England) Chas Mortimer	Yamaha	83.96 mph
1972	(England) Chas Mortimer	Yamaha	87.49 mph
1973	(Northern Ireland) Tommy Robb	Yamaha	88.91 mph
1974	(United Kingdom) Clive Horton	Yamaha	88.44 mph
1975-1988	Not Held		
1989	(Northern Ireland) Robert Dunlop	Honda	102.58 mph
1990	(Northern Ireland) Robert Dunlop	Honda	103.41 mph
1991	(Northern Ireland) Robert Dunlop	Honda	103.68 mph
1992	(Northern Ireland) Joey Dunlop	Honda	106.49 mph
1993	(Northern Ireland) Joey Dunlop	Honda	107.26 mph
1994	(Northern Ireland) Joey Dunlop	Honda	105.74 mph
1995	(United Kingdom) Mark Baldwin	Honda	107.14 mph
1996	(Northern Ireland) Joey Dunlop	Honda	106.33 mph
1997	(Wales) Ian Lougher	Honda	107.89 mph
1998	(Northern Ireland) Robert Dunlop	Honda	106.38 mph
1999	(Wales) Ian Lougher	Honda	107.43 mph
2000	(Northern Ireland) Joey Dunlop	Honda	107.14 mph
2001	Not held		
2002	(Wales) Ian Lougher	Honda	108.65 mph
2003	(England) Chris Palmer	Honda	108.65 mph
2004	(England) Chris Palmer	Honda	108.93 mph
2005-2007	Not Held		
2008	(England) Chris Palmer	Honda	94.042 mph
2009	(Wales) Ian Lougher	Honda	2 heats

=== 50cc Ultra-Lightweight TT Winners ===
Year	Rider	Motorcycle	Average Speed
1962	(West Germany) Ernst Degner	Suzuki	75.12 mph
1963	(Japan) Mitsuo Itoh	Suzuki	78.81 mph
1964	(New Zealand) Hugh Anderson	Suzuki	80.64 mph
1965	(Switzerland) Luigi Taveri	Honda	79.66 mph
1966	(Northern Ireland) Ralph Bryans	Honda	85.66 mph
1967	(United Kingdom) Stuart Graham	Suzuki	82.89 mph
1968	(Australia) Barry Smith	Derbi	72.90 mph

=== Ultra-Lightweight TT Race Winners ===
Rider	Wins
Joey Dunlop, Ian Lougher, Carlo Ubbiali	4
Robert Dunlop, Chris Palmer	3
Chas Mortimer, Phil Read, Tarquinio Provini*, Luigi Taveri	2
Hugh Anderson, M.Baldwin, Dieter Braun, Les Graham, Rupert Hollaus*, Wal Handley, C.Horton, Bill Ivy, Cromie McCandless, Mike Hailwood, Jack Porter, Tommy Robb, Cecil Sandford, Dave Simmonds	1

- *Indicates Ultra-Lightweight TT wins on the Clypse Course.

=== Ultra-Lightweight TT Race Winners by Marque ===
Marque	Wins
Honda	20
Yamaha	8
MV Agusta	7
Mondial, Suzuki	2
Kawasaki, New Imperial, NSU, Rex-Acme	1

== See also ==
- TTXGP
- Lightweight TT
- Sidecar TT
- Junior TT
- Senior TT
