= 1999 Isle of Man TT =

Annual motorcycle racing event

Isle of Man TT Mountain Course

The 1999 Isle of Man TT was the 93rd edition of the event. David Jefferies won three TTs during the event, including the marquee Senior TT race, more than anyone that year. Jim Moodie broke the outright lap record on lap one during the Senior TT, with a 124.45 mph (200.28 km/h) average, but he had to retire due to a shredded tyre on lap two.

The first race of the event, the Formula One TT, was red flagged on lap one after the TT career ending accident of Paul Orritt at Bray Hill. It was later restarted and won by Jefferies.

The sidecar honours were shared by Dave Molyneux and Rob Fisher, with Molyneux taking a new sidecar lap record in race one.

1998 Formula One TT and Senior TT winner Ian Simpson was not able to take part in the event due to leg injuries.

The event was marred by the death of four competitors: sidecar passengers Bernadette Bosman and Terry Fenton, and solo class riders Simon Beck and Stuart Murdoch. Beck was a podium finisher at the 1997 Isle of Man TT.

== Results ==
=== Formula One TT ===
Rank	Rider	Machine	Time	Speed (mph)
1	(England) David Jefferies	Yamaha	1.14.37.0	121.35
2	(Northern Ireland) Joey Dunlop	Honda	1.14.52.8	120.92
3	(Scotland) Iain Duffus	Yamaha	1.15.02.4	120.67
4	(Northern Ireland) James Courtney	Ducati	1.15.08.5	120.50
5	(Wales) Ian Lougher	Honda	1.16.01.8	119.10
6	(Isle of Man) Jason Griffiths	Yamaha	1.16.17.4	118.69

=== Sidecar Race A ===
Rank	Rider	Passenger	Machine	Time	Speed (mph)
1	(Isle of Man) Dave Molyneux	Craig Hallam	DMR Honda	1.00.41.5	111.90
2	(England) Rob Fisher	Rick Long	Baker Honda	1.02.34.1	108.54
3	(England) Tom Hanks	Steve Wilson	Windle	1.03.07.4	107.58
4	(England) Allan Schofield	Ian Simons	Baker	1.03.13.8	107.40
5	(England) Roy Hanks	Phillip Biggs	Molyneux Rose Yamaha	1.03.23.9	107.12
6	(England) Greg Lambert	Lee Aubrey	Windle Yamaha	1.04.17.7	105.62

=== Sidecar Race B ===
Rank	Rider	Passenger	Machine	Time	Speed (mph)
1	(England) Rob Fisher	Rick Long	Baker Honda	1.02.26.3	108.76
2	(England) Ian Bell	Neil Carpenter	Bell Yamaha	1.03.19.9	107.23
3	(England) Greg Lambert	Lee Aubrey	Windle Yamaha	1.03.31.9	106.89
4	(England) Steve Norbury	Andrew Smith	Shellbourne Yamaha	1.04.01.7	106.06
5	(England) Kenny Howles	Doug Jewell	Ireson Mistral	1.04.11.7	105.79
6	(England) Mick Boddice Jnr	Dave Wells	Windle Honda	1.04.52.9	104.67

=== Junior 600cc TT ===
Rank	Rider	Machine	Time	Speed (mph)
1	(Scotland) Jim Moodie	Honda	1.16.39.8	118.11
2	(England) David Jefferies	Yamaha	1.16.58.2	117.64
3	(Scotland) Iain Duffus	Yamaha	1.16.59.5	117.61
4	(Northern Ireland) Adrian Archibald	Honda	1.17.03.8	117.50
5	(Northern Ireland) Joey Dunlop	Honda	1.17.13.3	117.26
6	(Isle of Man) Jason Griffiths	Honda	1.17.14.2	117.23

=== Singles TT ===
Rank	Rider	Machine	Time	Speed (mph)
1	(England) Dave Morris	Chrysalis BMW	1.21.54.0	110.56
2	(England) Bill Swallow	BRS	1.24.26.4	107.23
3	(Isle of Man) Rich Hawkins	Tigcraft Rotax	1.27.30.9	103.47
4	(Scotland) Denis Gallagher	Tigcraft Yamaha	1.29.14.1	101.47
5	(England) Mick Jeffreys	Spondon Rotax	1.29.17.5	101.41
6	(England) Dennis Trollope	Spondon Yamaha	1.29.18.8	101.38

=== Lightweight 250 TT ===
Rank	Rider	Machine	Time	Speed (mph)
1	(England) John McGuinness	Honda	1.17.31.7	116.79
2	(Isle of Man) Jason Griffiths	Yamaha	1.18.05.1	115.96
3	(England) Gavin Lee	Yamaha	1.18.27.6	115.41
4	(Northern Ireland) Denis McCullough	Honda	1.19.01.1	114.59
5	(Northern Ireland) Joey Dunlop	Honda	1.19.05.8	114.48
6	(Northern Ireland) Gary Dynes	Honda	1.19.19.6	114.15

=== Lightweight 400 TT ===
Held simultaneously with the Lightweight 250 TT. Geoff McMullan and Nick Jefferies are tied for third place.

Rank	Rider	Machine	Time	Speed (mph)
1	(New Zealand) Paul Williams	Shand Honda	1.23.04.0	109.01
2	(England) Nigel Piercy	Honda	1.24.15.8	107.46
3	(Northern Ireland) Geoff McMullan	Yamaha	1.25.34.7	105.81
3	(England) Nick Jefferies	Yamaha	1.25.34.7	105.81
5	(Northern Ireland) Brian Gardiner	Kawasaki	1.25.52.3	105.45
6	(England) Dave Morris	Chrysalis	1.26.40.4	104.47

=== Ultra Lightweight TT ===
Rank	Rider	Machine	Time	Speed (mph)
1	(Wales) Ian Lougher	Honda	1.24.17.3	107.43
2	(Northern Ireland) Owen McNally	Honda	1.24.30.3	107.15
3	(Northern Ireland) Gary Dynes	Honda	1.24.40.1	106.94
4	(Northern Ireland) Darran Lindsay	Honda	1.25.07.4	106.37
5	(Northern Ireland) Robert Dunlop	Honda	1.25.58.7	105.31
6	(England) Michael Wilcox	Honda	1.27.00.8	104.06

=== Production TT ===
Rank	Rider	Machine	Time	Speed (mph)
1	(England) David Jefferies	Yamaha	56.49.9	119.50
2	(Isle of Man) Jason Griffiths	Yamaha	57.16.6	118.57
3	(Northern Ireland) Phillip McCallen	Yamaha	57.24.4	118.30
4	(Northern Ireland) Adrian Archibald	Honda	57.45.5	117.58
5	(England) Gordon Blackley	Kawasaki	58.05.1	116.92
6	(England) Simon Smith	Yamaha	58.08.5	116.80

=== Senior TT ===
Rank	Rider	Machine	Time	Speed (mph)
1	(England) David Jefferies	Yamaha	1.51.59.8	121.27
2	(Scotland) Iain Duffus	Yamaha	1.52.46.1	120.44
3	(Wales) Ian Lougher	Honda	1.52.47.2	120.42
4	(Wales) Nigel Davies	Yamaha	1.53.22.9	119.79
5	(Northern Ireland) Joey Dunlop	Honda	1.53.28.5	119.69
6	(Isle of Man) Jason Griffiths	Yamaha	1.54.05.4	119.05
