= 1994 Isle of Man TT =

Annual motorcycle racing event

Isle of Man TT Mountain Course

In the 1994 Isle of Man TT, Steve Hislop won the Senior TT and Formula I events. It marked the final time Hislop competed in the Isle of Man TT as he focused on circuit racing in both Superbike World Championship and British Superbike Championship in subsequent seasons.

Joey Dunlop won the Junior TT and Ultra-Lightweight TT events and finished 3rd on the podium in both the Senior TT and Formula I races.

Robert Dunlop had a bad crash at Ballaugh in the Formula I race left him with serious arm and leg injuries. He eventually recovered from those fractures, but it took him until the 1997 Isle of Man TT to return to the competition in the Ultra Lightweight TT, his only race start of the event.

Australian sidecar driver Gavin Porteous has been badly injured in the first practice and was unable to compete in this year's TT. Top contender Mark Farmer, from Ireland, was killed on June 2 in Thursday afternoon's practice session. Scotsman Robert Mitchell died on Tuesday, 7 June after suffering serious injuries in last Thursday's practice session.

== Results ==
=== Race 1 – TT Formula One ===
Rank	Rider	Team	Time	Speed (mph)
1	(Scotland) Steve Hislop	Castrol Honda RC45	1:53:37.20	119.54
2	(Northern Ireland) Phillip McCallen	Castrol Honda RC45	1:55:01.80	118.08
3	(Northern Ireland) Joey Dunlop	Castrol Honda RC45	1:56:23.60	116.69
4	(Isle of Man) Gary Radcliffe	Bullock Honda	1:59:00.20	114.13
5	(Scotland) Iain Duffus	Yamaha	1:59:36.00	113.56
6	(Wales) Nigel Davies	Honda RC30	1:59:39.20	113.51

=== Race 2 – Sidecar Race A ===
Rank	Rider	Passenger	Team	Time	Speed (mph)
1	(England) Rob Fisher	Michael Wynn	600 cc Jacobs Yamaha	1:04:14.6	105.71
2	(Isle of Man) Dave Molyneux	Pete Hill	600 cc DMR	1:04:39.2	105.04
3	(England) Mick Boddice	Dave Wells	600 cc Castrol Honda	1:05:39.4	103.43
4	(England) Kenny Howles	Rob Parker	600 cc Ireson Yamaha	1:06:14.6	102.52
5	(England) Geoff Bell	Nick Roche	600 cc Windle Yamaha	1:06:24.0	102.28
6	(England) Roy Hanks	(England) Tom Hanks	600 cc North Ireson	1:06:30.2	102.12

=== Race 3 – Singles TT ===
Rank	Rider	Team	Time	Speed (mph)
1	(Scotland) Jim Moodie	660 Harris Yamaha	1:21:21.6	111.29
2	(Australia) Robert Holden	560 Ducati	1:21:29.6	111.11
3	(Isle of Man) Jason Griffiths	680 Spondon Yamaha	1:27:36.6	103.35
4	(Isle of Man) Gary Radcliffe	660 Spondon DTR Yamaha	1:30:22.0	100.2
5	Matthew Wood	580 Harris	1:30:23.0	100.18
6	Derek Young	680 Taylor Honda	1:30:40.0	99.87

=== Race 4 – Ultra Lightweight ===
Rank	Rider	Team	Time	Speed (mph)
1	(Northern Ireland) Joey Dunlop	Honda	1:25:38.40	105.74
2	(Northern Ireland) Denis McCullough	DTR Yamaha	1:26:49.20	104.29
3	(Isle of Man) Chris Fargher	Honda	1:27:55.60	102.98
4	Noel Clegg	Honda	1:29:20.40	101.35
5	(England) Glen English	Yamaha	1:30:25.80	100.13
6	(Northern Ireland) Gary Dynes	Yamaha	1:30:50.60	99.67

=== Race 5 – Supersport 600 TT ===
Rank	Rider	Team	Time	Speed (mph)
1	(Scotland) Iain Duffus	Duckhams FZR Yamaha	1:18:32.00	115.3
2	(Scotland) Ian Simpson	CBR Honda or Yamaha?	1:18:41.40	115.07
3	(England) Steve Ward	CBR Honda	1:18:43.80	115.01
4	(Northern Ireland) Phillip McCallen	CBR Clucas Honda	1:18:52.60	114.8
5	(England) Bob Jackson	CBR Honda	1:19:16.20	114.23
6	(England) Nick Jefferies	CBR Harris Honda	1:19:36.00	113.75

=== Race 6 – Junior TT ===
Rank	Rider	Team	Time	Speed (mph)
1	(Northern Ireland) Joey Dunlop	Castrol Honda	1:18:57.80	114.67
2	(Northern Ireland) Brian Reid	Yamaha	1:19:23.40	114.05
3	(Isle of Man) Jason Griffiths	Spondon Yamaha	1:19:45.40	113.53
4	(Scotland) Ian Simpson	Yamaha	1:19:48.40	113.46
5	(Wales) Ian Lougher	Snowdon Honda	1:19:58.00	113.23
6	(England) Gavin Lee	Yamaha	1:20:43.40	112.17

=== Race 7 – Supersport 400 TT ===
Rank	Rider	Team	Time	Speed (mph)
1	(Scotland) Jim Moodie	FZR Yamaha	1:23:41.2	108.21
2	(England) Steve Linsdell	Yamaha	1:24:58.8	106.55
3	(England) Dave Morris	Chrysalis Yamaha	1:25:18.0	106.15
4	Derek Young	Honda	1:25:27.6	105.95
5	Gary Long	Yamaha	1:26:27.0	104.74
6	Nigel Piercy	Yamaha	1:27:24.8	103.59

=== Race 8 – Sidecar Race B ===
Rank	Rider	Passenger	Team	Time	Speed (mph)
1	(England) Rob Fisher	Michael Wynn	600 cc Jacobs Yamaha	1:05:41.0	103.39
2	(Isle of Man) Dave Molyneux	Pete Hill	600 cc DMR	1:06:27.8	102.18
3	(England) Mick Boddice	Dave Wells	600 cc Castrol Honda	1:06:54.0	101.51
4	(England) Roy Hanks	(England) Tom Hanks	600 cc North Ireson	1:06:56.4	101.45
5	(England) Geoff Bell	Nick Roche	600 cc Windle Yamaha	1:07:52.8	100.05
6	David Kimberley	Tony Darby	600 cc Ireson Kawasaki	1:07:56.2	99.96

=== Race 9 – Senior TT ===
Rank	Rider	Team	Time	Speed (mph)
1	(Scotland) Steve Hislop	Castrol Honda	1:53:53.80	119.25
2	(Northern Ireland) Phillip McCallen	Castrol Honda	1:55:08.80	117.96
3	(Northern Ireland) Joey Dunlop	Castrol Honda	1:56:20.20	116.75
4	(Wales) Nigel Davies	Honda	1:56:37.80	116.46
5	(Isle of Man) Jason Griffiths	Webb Kawasaki	1:56:59.40	116.1
6	(Isle of Man) Gary Radcliffe	Bullock Honda	1:57:34.00	115.53
