= 1993 Isle of Man TT =

Annual motorcycle racing event

Isle of Man TT Mountain Course

The 1993 Isle of Man TT held the event for the 87th time. The 1993 TT highlights were Joey Dunlop's historic 15th TT victory surpassing Mike Hailwood's all-time record of 14 at the time, Nick Jefferies' first TT win in the Formula I race, and Philip McCallen's Senior TT victory, among the double victory of Dave Molyneux & Karl Ellison in the sidecars and the other winning performances from Jim Moodie in both Supersport TT races and Brian Reid in the Junior TT. It was the event's first-time display of on-screen RPM and speed telemetry data from McCallen's RVF 750 Honda on Television.

== Results ==
=== Race 1 – TT Formula One ===
Rank	Rider	Team	Time	Speed (mph)
1	(England) Nick Jefferies	Castrol Honda RC30	1:54:57.20	118.15
2	(Northern Ireland) Phillip McCallen	Castrol Honda RC30	1:55:12.40	117.89
3	(England) Steve Ward	Honda RC30	1:55:32.00	117.56
4	(Isle of Man) Jason Griffiths	Honda RC30	1:55:57.40	117.13
5	(England) Trevor Nation	Yamaha	1:57:04.40	116.01
6	(Scotland) Jim Moodie	Honda RC30	1:57:52.40	115.23

=== Race 2 – Sidecar Race A ===
Rank	Rider	Passenger	Team	Time	Speed (mph)
1	(Isle of Man) Dave Molyneux	Karl Ellison	600 Yamaha	1:05:43.4	103.33
2	Dave Saville	Nick Roche	350 Yamaha Sabre	1:06:09.0	102.66
3	(England) Eddie Wright	Pete Hill	600 Honda	1:06:27.0	102.2
4	Dick Hawes	Eddie Kiff	600 Yamaha	1:07:26.4	100.7
5	(England) Rob Fisher	Vince Butler	600 Yamaha	1:07:31.4	100.57
6	(England) Richard Crossley	Colin Hardman	600 Honda	1:08:12.6	99.56

=== Race 3 – Ultra Lightweight ===
Rank	Rider	Team	Time	Speed (mph)
1	(Northern Ireland) Joey Dunlop	Honda	1:24:25.0	107.26
2	(Northern Ireland) Robert Dunlop	Honda	1:24:37.6	107
3	Bob Heath	Honda	1:26:24.8	104.78
4	(Northern Ireland) Denis McCullough	Honda	1:28:57.0	101.8
5	Garry Bennett	Honda	1:28:59.8	101.74
6	Richard Parrot	Honda	1:29:45.4	100.88

=== Race 4 – Supersport 600 TT ===
Rank	Rider	Team	Time	Speed (mph)
1	(Scotland) Jim Moodie	Honda	1:18:41.8	115.06
2	(England) Bob Jackson	Honda	1:19:03.6	114.53
3	(England) Simon Beck	Honda	1:19:20.0	114.14
4	(Scotland) Ian Simpson	Honda	1:19:21.6	114.1
5	(Northern Ireland) Mark Farmer	Yamaha	1:19:30.0	113.9
6	(England) Nick Jefferies	Honda	1:19:31.8	113.85

=== Race 5 – Junior TT ===
Rank	Rider	Team	Time	Speed (mph)
1	(Northern Ireland) Brian Reid	Yamaha	1:18:36.80	115.14
2	(Scotland) Jim Moodie	Honda	1:18:45.80	114.96
3	(Northern Ireland) Joey Dunlop	Honda	1:18:59.80	114.62
4	Mark Baldwin	Yamaha	1:20:21.60	112.68
5	(England) Lee Pullan	Yamaha	1:20:25.20	112.59
6	Dave Milling	Yamaha	1:20:48.80	112.05

=== Race 6 – Supersport 400 TT ===
Rank	Rider	Team	Time	Speed (mph)
1	(Scotland) Jim Moodie	Yamaha FZR400	1:21:15.4	111.43
2	(Scotland) Iain Duffus	Yamaha	1:22:15.4	110.08
3	(England) Steve Linsdell	Yamaha	1:23:00.8	109.08
4	(Northern Ireland) Brian Reid	Yamaha	1:23:06.8	108.95
5	(England) Dave Morris	Yamaha	1:23:56.8	107.86
6	(England) Nick Jefferies	Honda	1:24:50.0	106.74

=== Race 7 – Sidecar Race B ===
Rank	Rider	Passenger	Team	Time	Speed (mph)
1	(Isle of Man) Dave Molyneux	Karl Ellison	600 Yamaha	1:05:50.0	103.16
2	(England) Eddie Wright	Pete Hill	600 Honda	1:06:41.4	101.83
3	(England) Richard Crossley	Colin Hardman	600 Honda	1:06:46.6	101.7
4	Dick Hawes	Eddie Kiff	600 Yamaha	1:07:17.0	100.93
5	(England) Roy Hanks	(England) Tom Hanks	350 Yamaha	1:07:46.4	100.2
6	Vince Biggs	Jamie Biggs	350 Yamaha	1:07:58.4	99.91

=== Race 8 – Senior TT ===
Rank	Rider	Team	Time	Speed (mph)
1	(Northern Ireland) Phillip McCallen	Castrol Honda	1:54:47.80	118.32
2	(England) Nick Jefferies	Honda	1:55:32.80	117.55
3	(England) Steve Ward	Honda	1:56:46.40	116.31
4	(Isle of Man) Jason Griffiths	Honda	1:57:26.40	115.65
5	(Scotland) Ian Simpson	Kawasaki	1:58:15.20	114.86
6	(Northern Ireland) Johnny Rea	Yamaha	1:58:32.20	114.58
