= 1997 Isle of Man TT =

Annual motorcycle racing event

Isle of Man TT Mountain Course

The 1997 Isle of Man TT was the 91st edition of the event. Phillip McCallen was the only rider to win multiple races, taking three, including the marquee Senior TT. He brought his TT win tally to 11 at the event. McCallen had a high speed crash at Quarry Bends during the Lightweight TT, but he was fine, and won the Junior TT two days later.

Robert Dunlop made his come back after a bad crash in 1994 left him with serious injuries. He finished third in the Ultra Lightweight TT, his only race start of the event.

Two riders died during the event, Russell Waring and Colin Gable. They both died on 26 May 1997 after separate accidents during the opening practice day.

== Results ==
=== Formula One TT ===
Rank	Rider	Machine	Time	Speed (mph)
1	(Northern Ireland) Phillip McCallen	Honda	1.53.16.8	119.91
2	(England) Michael Rutter	Honda	1.54.52.5	118.23
3	(England) Bob Jackson	Kawasaki	1.55.03.2	118.05
4	(Scotland) Ian Simpson	Honda	1.55.05.6	118.01
5	(England) Mark Flynn	Honda	1.55.59.7	117.09
6	(Northern Ireland) Joey Dunlop	Honda	1.56.29.4	116.60

=== Singles TT ===
Rank	Rider	Machine	Time	Speed (mph)
1	(England) Dave Morris	Chrysalis BMW	1.21.58.2	110.46
2	(Isle of Man) Johnny Barton	Ducati	1.23.37.6	108.28
3	(England) Steve Linsdell	Tigcraft Yamaha	1.24.01.5	107.76
4	(Germany) Johannes Kehrer	MuZ Scorpion	1.24.08.3	107.62
5	(Isle of Man) Danny Shimmin	Matchless	1.27.33.0	103.42
6	(Isle of Man) Rich Hawkins	Tigcraft Rotax	1.28.00.4	102.89

=== Ultra Lightweight TT ===
Rank	Rider	Machine	Time	Speed (mph)
1	(Wales) Ian Lougher	Honda	1.23.55.4	107.89
2	(Northern Ireland) Denis McCullough	Honda	1.23.57.5	107.85
3	(Northern Ireland) Robert Dunlop	Honda	1.24.30.9	107.14
4	(England) Glen English	Honda	1.24.37.9	106.99
5	(Northern Ireland) Owen McNally	Honda	1.25.13.0	106.26
6	(England) Gavin Lee	Honda	1.25.15.2	106.21

=== Lightweight TT ===
Rank	Rider	Machine	Time	Speed (mph)
1	(Northern Ireland) Joey Dunlop	Honda	1.18.20.1	115.59
2	(Wales) Ian Lougher	Honda	1.19.07.0	114.45
3	(England) John McGuinness	Aprilia	1.19.08.4	114.42
4	(New Zealand) Shaun Harris	Yamaha	1.19.10.7	114.36
5	(Northern Ireland) Gary Dynes	Honda	1.19.31.9	113.85
6	(Northern Ireland) Derek Young	Honda	1.19.49.3	113.44

=== Junior TT ===
Rank	Rider	Machine	Time	Speed (mph)
1	(Scotland) Ian Simpson	Honda	1.16.28.3	118.41
2	(Northern Ireland) Phillip McCallen	Honda	1.16.57.8	117.65
3	(England) Michael Rutter	Honda	1.17.21.7	117.05
4	(Northern Ireland) Derek Young	Honda	1.17.21.9	117.04
5	(Northern Ireland) Joey Dunlop	Honda	1.17.42.6	116.52
6	(England) Bob Jackson	Honda	1.17.51.6	116.30

=== Production TT ===
Rank	Rider	Machine	Time	Speed (mph)
1	(Northern Ireland) Phillip McCallen	Honda	38.39.4	117.12
2	(Scotland) Ian Simpson	Ducati	38.47.0	116.74
3	(England) Simon Beck	Honda	39.08.3	115.68
4	(England) Mark Flynn	Suzuki	39.28.9	114.67
5	(England) Jim Hodson	Yamaha	39.30.2	114.61
6	(Northern Ireland) Derek Young	Honda	39.34.5	114.40

=== Sidecar Race A ===
Rank	Rider	Passenger	Machine	Time	Speed (mph)
1	(England) Roy Hanks	Phillip Biggs	Beale Ireson NRH	1.03.29.7	106.95
2	Vince Biggs	Graham Biggs	Molyneux Yamaha	1.03.31.9	106.89
3	(England) Tom Hanks	Steve Wilson	Tamzine Hanks Yamaha	1.03.37.1	106.75
4	(England) John Holden	Ian Watson	Jacobs	1.03.52.8	106.31
5	(England) Kenny Howles	Doug Jewell	Ireson Mist Yamaha	1.04.02.5	106.04
6	(England) Allan Schofield	Andrew Thornton	Astra Yamaha	1.04.17.8	105.62

=== Sidecar Race B ===
Rank	Rider	Passenger	Machine	Time	Speed (mph)
1	(England) Rob Fisher	Rick Long	Express Baker	1.01.47.8	109.89
2	(England) Tom Hanks	Steve Wilson	Tamzine Hanks Yamaha	1.02.52.2	108.02
3	(England) Ian Bell	Neil Carpenter	Bell Yamaha	1.03.05.6	107.64
4	(England) Roy Hanks	Phillip Biggs	Beale Ireson NRH	1.03.25.0	107.09
5	(England) Gary Horspole	Kevin Leigh	Shellbourne UK Honda	1.03.56.8	106.20
6	(England) John Holden	Ian Watson	Jacobs	1.04.03.4	106.02

=== Senior TT ===
Rank	Rider	Machine	Time	Speed (mph)
1	(Northern Ireland) Phillip McCallen	Honda	1.53.36.6	119.45
2	(Scotland) Jim Moodie	Honda	1.53.45.3	119.40
3	(Scotland) Ian Simpson	Honda	1.54.30.2	118.62
4	(England) Bob Jackson	Kawasaki	1.54.50.6	118.27
5	(England) Simon Beck	Kawasaki	1.55.04.4	118.03
6	(Northern Ireland) Derek Young	Honda	1.55.28.5	117.62
