= Bill Swallow =

British motorcycle rider

- Nationality: British
Motorcycle racing career statistics
Isle of Man TT career
TTs contested	6 (1994-1996, 1998-2000)
TT wins	0
TT podiums	1

Bill Swallow is a classic motorcycle rider from Yorkshire.

== Racing ==
He has won the Manx Grand Prix 9 times, a feat only bettered by Bob Heath. He has averaged 110 mph on the course and has been interviewed by Murray Walker about his successes.

He retired from racing in 2003, but later returned. He came 4th in the 2011 350 cc Junior Classic Race on the mountain course.

== Personal life ==
Outside of racing, Bill was a teacher at Holmfirth High School, West Yorkshire.
