= 1992 Isle of Man TT =

Annual motorcycle racing event

Isle of Man TT Mountain Course

The 1992 Isle of Man TT was the 86th edition of the event. Geoff Bell, Brian Reid and Phillip McCallen all won two races each. Bell and passenger Keith Cornbill took both Sidecar races, Reid was victorious at the Junior TT and Supersport 400 TT, while Phillip McCallen held off Steve Hislop at the Formula One TT and Supersport 600 TT. The Ultra-Lightweight TT was a Dunlop family one-two, with Joey Dunlop equalling Mike Hailwood's record of 14 TT wins, and younger brother Robert finishing less than nine seconds behind in second.

The closing race, the 1992 Senior TT, is often regarded as one of the best, if not the best race in TT history. Steve Hislop and Carl Fogarty, who had both failed to win a race so far that year, went head-to-head in an extremely close duel, swapping first position several times during the 6 laps race. Hislop had to start the race further down the field with #19, compared to Fogarty's #4, which meant he had to contend with more traffic during the early laps. In the end, Hislop came first by only four seconds, beating Fogarty who set a new track record in the final lap. It was the last time Fogarty and Hislop raced against each other at the TT, as Fogarty never competed again on the Isle of Man TT course, while Hislop had his final start in 1994.

One competitor died during the event: 1964 Olympic gold medallist luger Manfred Stengl, who crashed at the 33rd Milestone while holding last position during the Formula One TT.

== Results ==
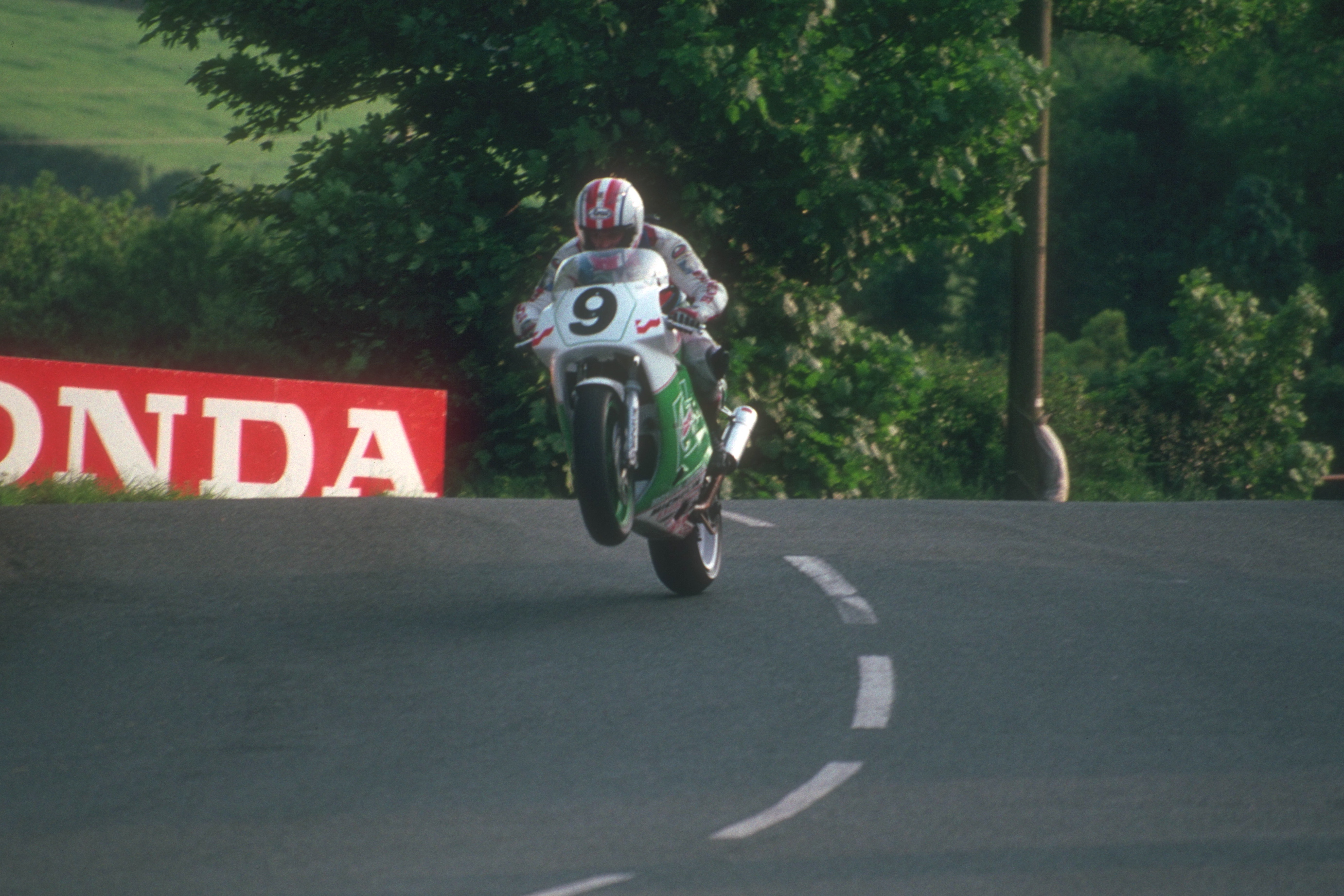
Formula One TT winner Phillip McCallen at Ballaugh Bridge

=== Formula One TT ===
Rank	Rider	Bike	Time	Speed (mph)
1	(Northern Ireland) Phillip McCallen	750 Honda	1.53.22.4	119.81
2	(Scotland) Steve Hislop	588 Norton	1.53.34.4	119.59
3	(Northern Ireland) Joey Dunlop	750 Honda	1.55.13.0	117.88
4	(England) Nick Jefferies	750 Honda	1.55.25.0	117.68
5	(Northern Ireland) Mark Farmer	750 Yamaha	1.55.45.6	117.33
6	(England) Steve Ward	750 Honda	1.56.45.4	116.33

=== Sidecar Race A ===
Rank	Rider	Passenger	Team	Time	Speed (mph)
1	(England) Geoff Bell	Keith Cornbill	600 Honda	1.06.54.4	101.51
2	(England) Eddie Wright	Pete Hill	600 Honda	1.07.29.6	100.62
3	(England) Mick Boddice	Dave Wells	600 Honda	1.08.04.0	99.77
4	(England) Roy Hanks	Tom Hanks	350 Yamaha	1.08.07.2	99.69
5	Neil Smith	Terrie Salone	350 Yamaha	1.08.07.2	99.69
6	(Isle of Man) Dave Molyneux	Karl Ellison	600 Kawasaki	1.08.28.4	99.18

=== Sidecar Race B ===
Rank	Rider	Passenger	Team	Time	Speed (mph)
1	(England) Geoff Bell	Keith Cornbill	600 Yamaha	1.06.55.0	101.49
2	(England) Mick Boddice	Dave Wells	600 Honda	1.07.28.0	100.66
3	(Isle of Man) Dave Molyneux	Karl Ellison	600 Kawasaki	1.07.54.2	100.01
4	Neil Smith	Terrie Salone	350 Yamaha	1.08.05.8	99.73
5	Peter Krukowski	Chris McGahan	350 Yamaha	1.08.18.8	99.41
6	Dave Saville	Nick Roche	350 Yamaha	1.08.35.0	99.02

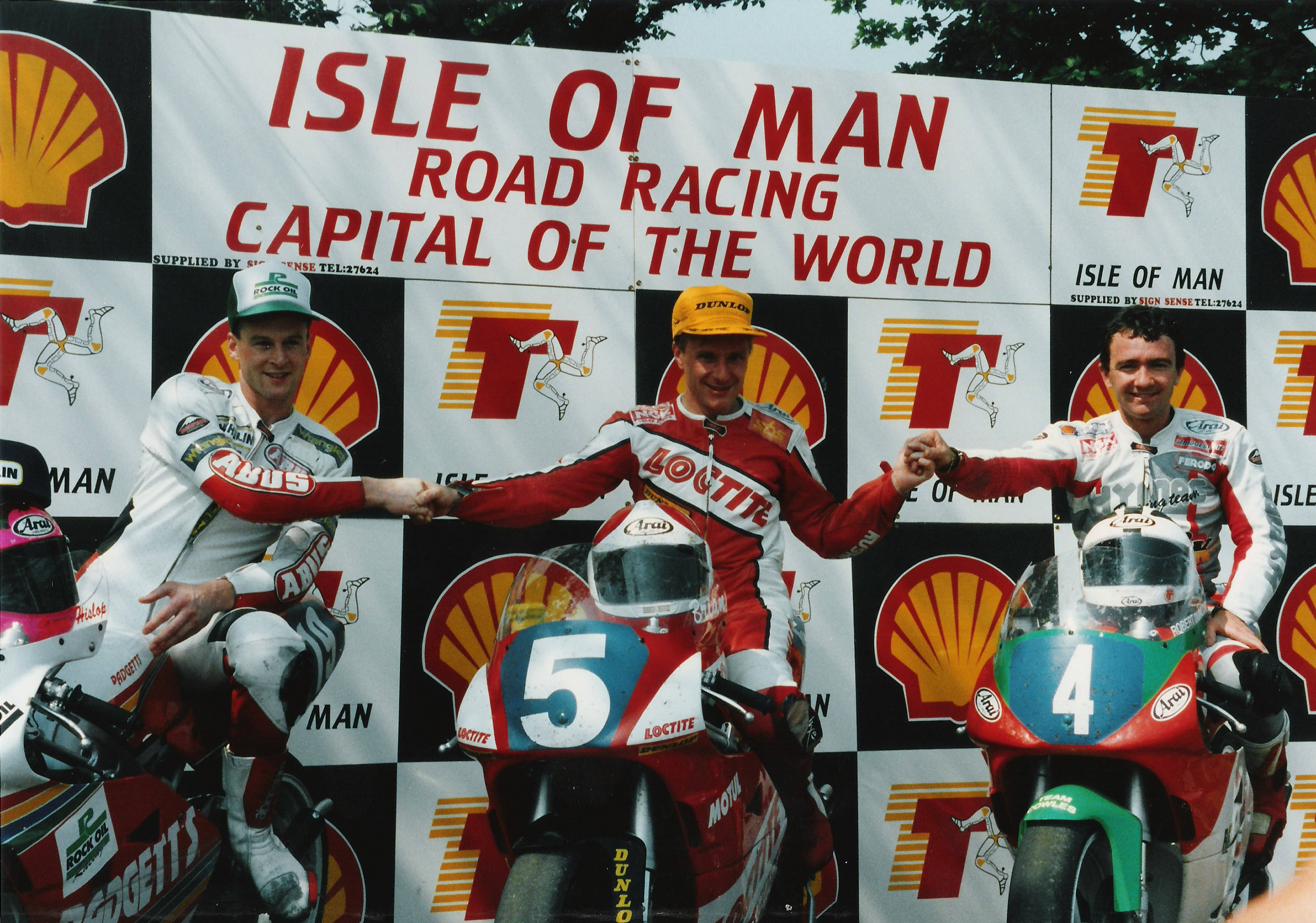
Junior TT podium finishers Steve Hislop, Brian Reid and Robert Dunlop (from left to right)

=== Junior TT ===
Rank	Rider	Bike	Time	Speed (mph)
1	(Northern Ireland) Brian Reid	Yamaha	1.18.38.8	115.13
2	(Scotland) Steve Hislop	Yamaha	1.18.42.0	115.05
3	(Northern Ireland) Robert Dunlop	Yamaha	1.19.30.2	113.89
4	(England) Steve Johnson	Yamaha	1.19.49.8	113.43
5	(Wales) Ian Lougher	Yamaha	1.19.54.4	113.32
6	(England) Bob Jackson	Yamaha	1.21.16.2	111.42

=== Supersport 600 ===
Rank	Rider	Bike	Time	Speed (mph)
1	(Northern Ireland) Phillip McCallen	Honda	1.18.42.8	115.04
2	(Scotland) Steve Hislop	Honda	1.19.05.6	114.48
3	(England) Steve Ward	Honda	1.19.30.2	113.89
4	(England) Nick Jefferies	Honda	1.19.40.8	113.64
5	(England) Bob Jackson	Honda	1.19.47.0	113.49
6	(Northern Ireland) Johnny Rea	Yamaha	1.20.25.0	112.60

=== Supersport 400 ===
Rank	Rider	Bike	Time	Speed (mph)
1	(Northern Ireland) Brian Reid	Yamaha	1.21.56.6	110.50
2	(Northern Ireland) Phillip McCallen	Honda	1.22.51.4	109.28
3	(England) Steve Linsdell	Yamaha	1.23.09.8	108.88
4	(England) Nick Jefferies	Honda	1.23.47.4	108.07
5	(Scotland) Iain Duffus	Yamaha	1.24.33.6	107.08
6	(Northern Ireland) Mark Farmer	Yamaha	1.25.46.0	105.57

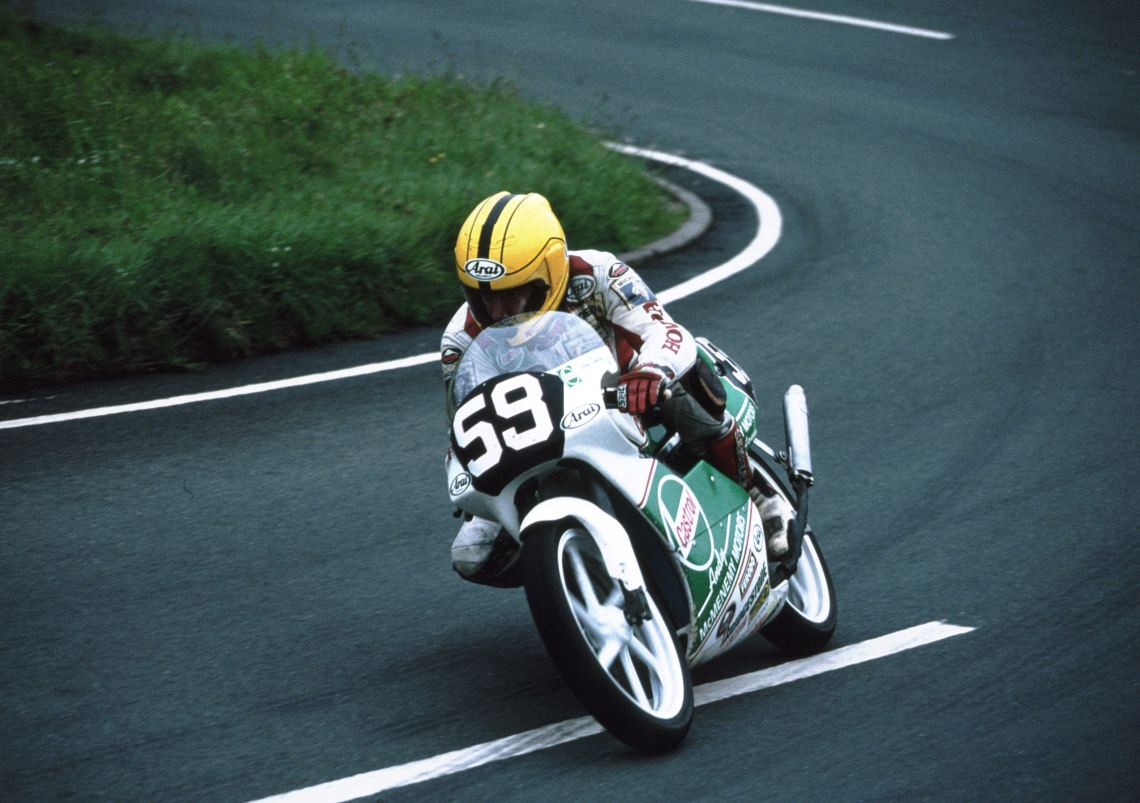
Ultra Lightweight TT winner Joey Dunlop at the Gooseneck

=== Ultra Lightweight ===
Rank	Rider	Bike	Time	Speed (mph)
1	(Northern Ireland) Joey Dunlop	Honda	1.25.01.6	106.49
2	(Northern Ireland) Robert Dunlop	Honda	1.25.10.0	106.32
3	(England) Mick Lofthouse	Honda	1.27.30.2	103.48
4	(Northern Ireland) Stanley Rea	Honda	1.27.57.8	102.94
5	(England) Steve Johnson	Honda	1.28.08.2	102.74
6	(Northern Ireland) Denis McCullough	Honda	1.28.10.8	102.68

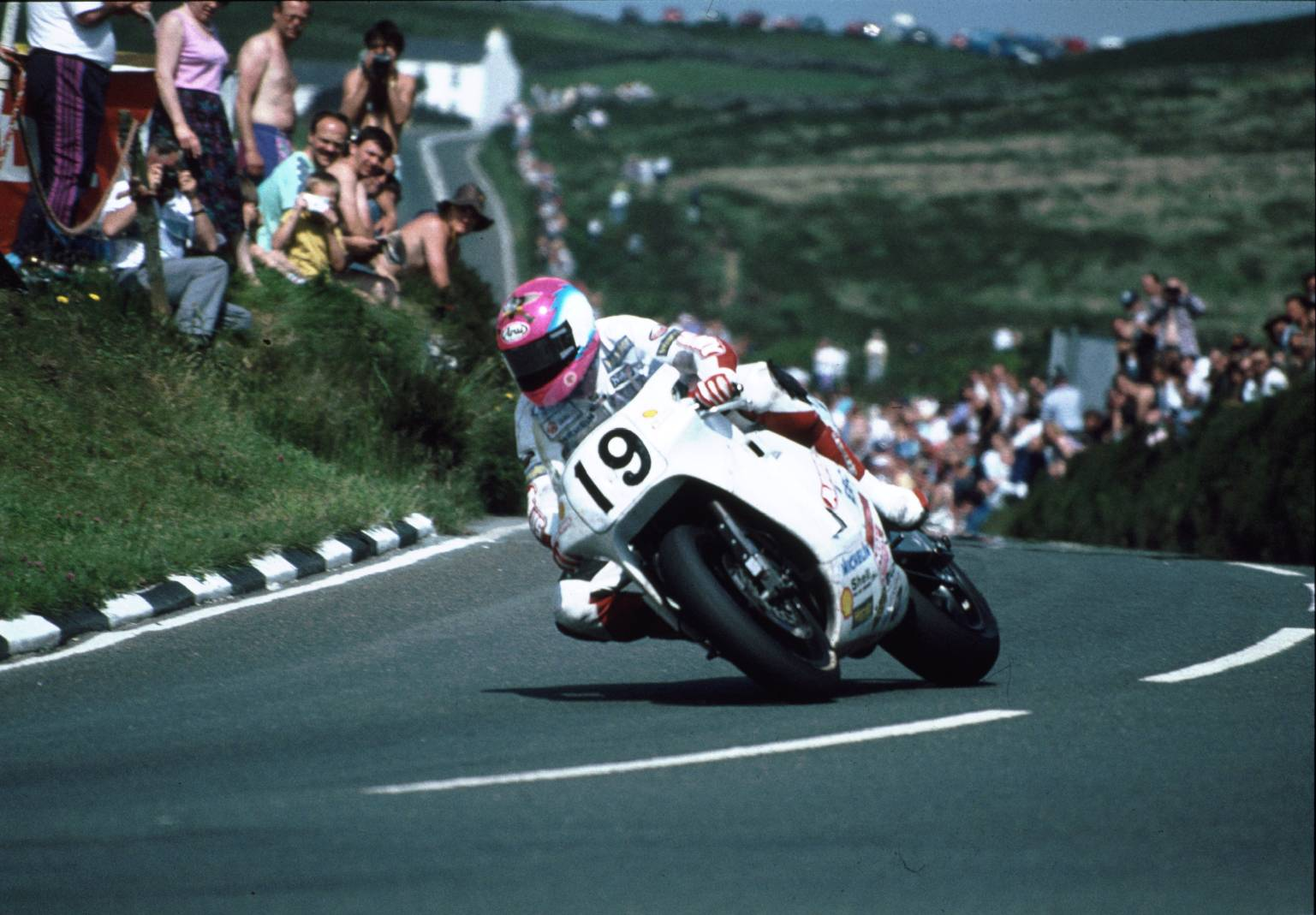
Senior TT winner Steve Hislop at Creg-ny-Baa

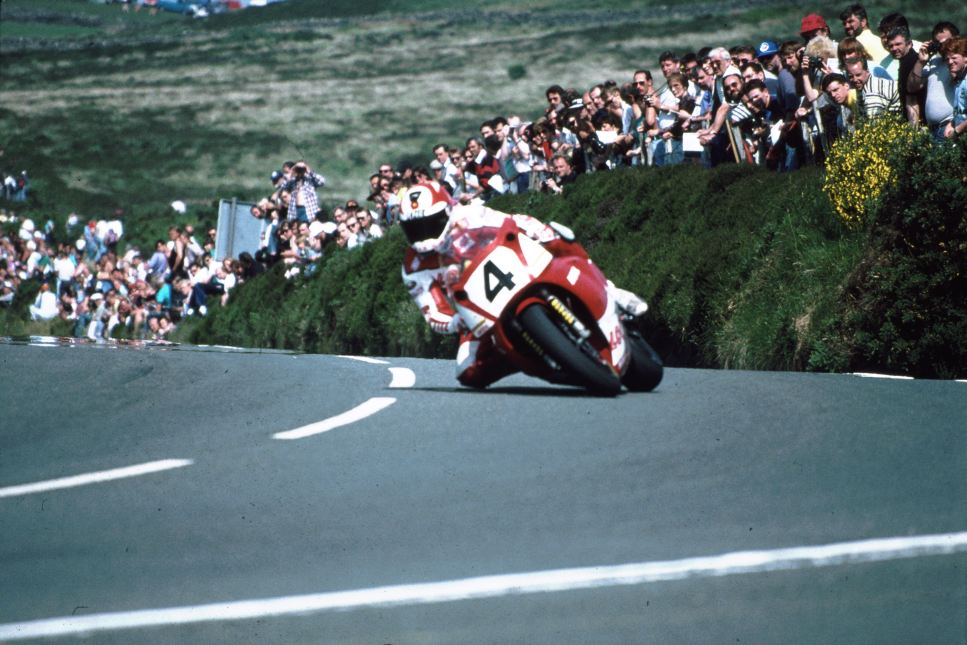
Senior TT second-place finisher Carl Fogarty at Creg-ny-Baa

=== Senior TT ===
Rank	Rider	Bike	Time	Speed (mph)
1	(Scotland) Steve Hislop	588 Norton	1.51.59.6	121.28
2	(England) Carl Fogarty	750 Yamaha	1.52.04.0	121.2
3	(Northern Ireland) Robert Dunlop	588 Norton	1.54.02.6	119.10
4	(England) Nick Jefferies	750 Honda	1.54.33.2	118.57
5	(Northern Ireland) Mark Farmer	750 Yamaha	1.54.47.6	118.32
6	(England) Robert Farmer	750 Yamaha	1.57.03.6	116.03
