= Robert Dunlop =

Northern Irish motorcycle racer (1960–2008)

- Dunlop with the 1990 Norton Rotary
- Nationality: Northern Irish
- Born: 25 November 1960; Coleraine, Northern Ireland
- Died: 15 May 2008 (aged 47)
Motorcycle racing career statistics
Isle of Man TT career
TTs contested	23 (1983–2005)
TT wins	5
First TT win	1989 Ultra-Lightweight TT
Last TT win	1998 Ultra-Lightweight TT
TT podiums	14

Stephen Robert Dunlop (25 November 1960 – 15 May 2008) was a Northern Irish motorcycle racer. He was the younger brother of fellow road racer Joey Dunlop and the father of racers William Dunlop and Michael Dunlop. Like his brother, Dunlop died after a crash, suffering fatal chest injuries during practice for the North West 200 in May 2008. His son William also died in a crash during practice at the Skerries 100 in Dublin in July 2018.

== Biography ==
After an apprenticeship on short circuits, the teenage Dunlop made his road race debut at the 1979 Temple 100. His first appearance at the Cookstown 100 came in 1980, riding a 347 cm^{3} Yamaha. His first professional race, where he was fully sponsored was at Aghadowey in 1981.

Dunlop then began a record-breaking run at the Cookstown 100, where his first win came in the 1985 250 cm^{3} race. Riding an ECM, he averaged 88.57 mph to take the chequered flag ahead of Gary Cowan (EMC) and Noel Hudson (Rotax). His most successful year was 1987 when he scooped the prestigious "Man of the Meeting", winning 125 cm^{3}, 350 cm^{3} and 1000 cm^{3} races. Four more 125 cm^{3} victories followed in 1988, 1989, 1991 and 1993; a total of eight victories in the event.

Dunlop won the Macau Grand Prix in 1989 on a Honda 500, beating Phillip McCallen and Steve Hislop, both on Honda 750's.

In 1990, Dunlop joined the JPS Norton racing team on the RCW588, which was powered by a Wankel engine. On short circuits Dunlop notched one of the three MCN Supercup wins, the other two by Terry Rymer. Dunlop notched a double in Ireland's North West 200 and finished third in the F1 Isle of Man TT.

In 1994, Dunlop suffered a major accident on the Isle of Man Formula One TT, when the back wheel of his 750 cm^{3} Honda RC45 collapsed in a long left turn, just after he took the jump over Ballaugh Bridge. Dunlop suffered multiple injuries and was lucky to have survived the high-speed crash. A long stay in hospital, followed by protracted recuperation, meant Dunlop was out of action for the remainder of 1994 and all of 1995.

Many believed that Dunlop's racing career was over, and he was left with severe tendon damage which restricted movement, and a shortened leg from the accident. Afterwards accepting his injuries and resultantly restricting his competition entries from then on to the 125 cm^{3} class, Dunlop was determined to return. Dunlop chose the Cookstown 100 on 20 April 1996, and although still not fully fit, took ninth place in the 125 cm^{3} race won by brother Joey. He was never to win the main Cookstown 100 race again, but returned every year in the 125 cm^{3} class: 3rd in 1997, 4th in 1998, 3rd in 2002 and 2nd in 2004.

Subject to severe insurance restrictions and costs due to his continual pain and deteriorating condition of his leg, and even questions in the Northern Ireland Assembly, on 16 December 2003, Dunlop announced that he would quit motorcycle racing after the 2004 season. Dunlop announced that he was hoping to win the Isle of Man TT and North West 200 before he quit, and that he intended to focus on his sons, William and Michael, and pass his motorcycling experience to them. Robert continued racing until his retirement at the 2004 Isle of Man TT races.

On 8 February 2005, Dunlop was the first person to be elected to the "Irish Motorcycle Hall of Fame". At the event, Dunlop announced that he was shortly to enter hospital to have his injured leg broken and lengthened, an inevitable conclusion to his 1994 Isle of Man TT accident. He also announced if all went well, he would love to return to motorcycle racing in 2006, sponsored by Patsy O'Kane in a last hurrah. Dunlop actually came back out of retirement during the 2005 road racing season.

Dunlop took his record-breaking 15th win at the 2006 North West 200 meeting. The Dunlop brothers between them also won a record number of races at the North West 200.

== Isle of Man TT record ==
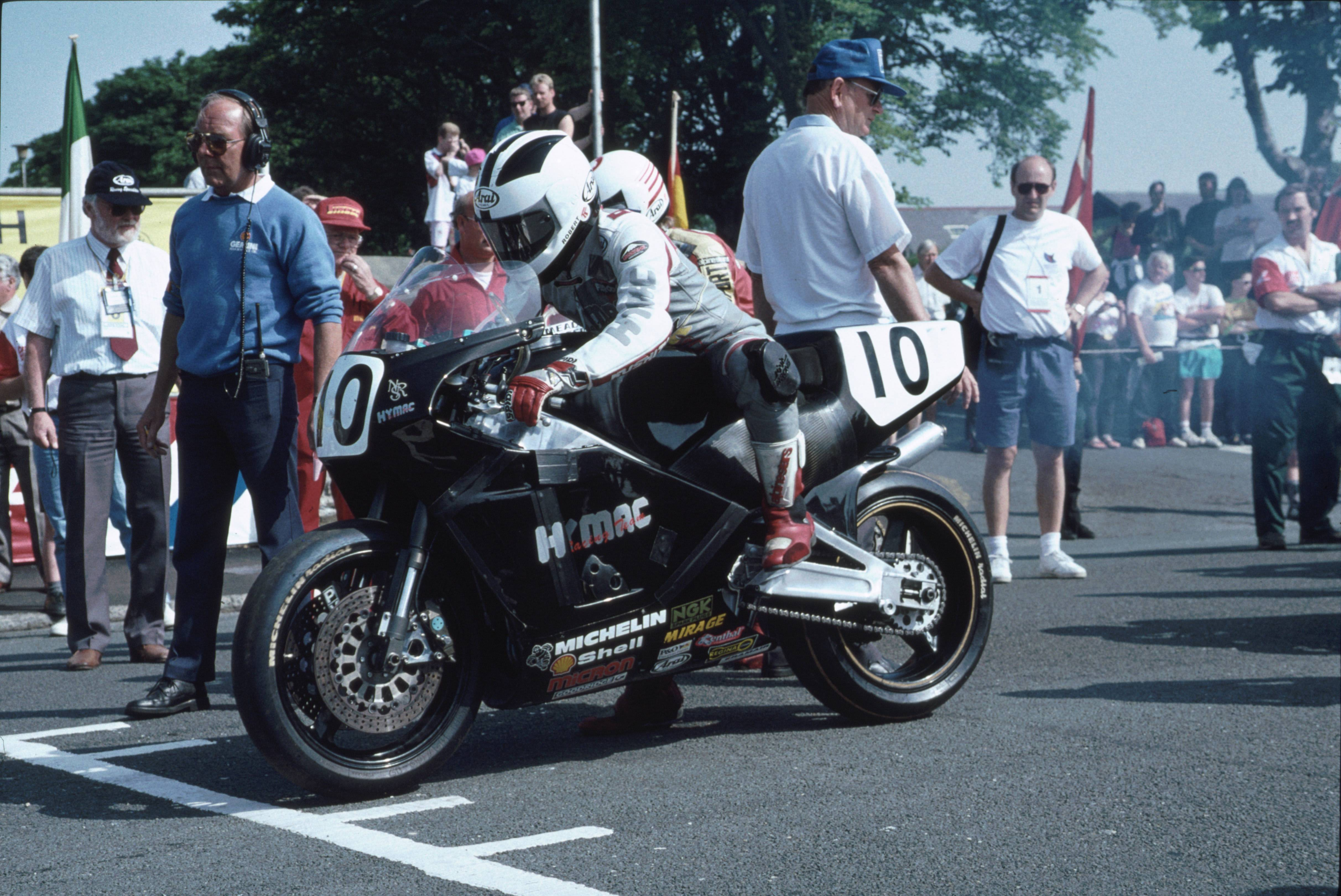
Dunlop at the start during the Senior TT race in 1992

A winner on the course at his first attempt, Dunlop won the 1983 Newcomers 350 cm^{3} Manx Grand Prix, beating other future TT winners Steve Hislop and Ian Lougher. In 1989, he scored his first TT win in the 125 cm^{3} Class with a new lap record at 165.79 km/h (103.02 mph). In 1990, he repeated his success in the 125 with a new lap record at 167.52 km/h (104.09 mph), and third place in the Formula 1 TT on the Norton Rotary. In 1991, he scored a double victory taking the 125 cm^{3} Race for the third year in succession with a record at 166.86 km/h (103.68 mph) and a new lap record at 171.73 km/h (106.71 mph). He also won the Junior TT at 184.90 km/h (114.89 mph). In 1992, he finished second in the 125 and third in the Junior and Senior, and in 1993, he finished second in the 125.

In 1994, an accident at Ballaugh Bridge in the Formula 1 ended his week. He did not race again in the TT until 1997 in the 125 cm^{3} Race and took third place. In 1998 he won the Ultra-Lightweight race and in 1999 finished fifth. In 2000, he rode a Honda in the Ultra-Lightweight and brought it home in third place. Over his career, he finished on a TT podium 14 times.

=== Complete TT record ===
2004	Ultra Lightweight 125cc 2			
2003	Ultra Lightweight 125cc 4			
2002	Ultra Lightweight 125cc 3			
2000	Ultra Lightweight; 3			
1999	Ultra Lightweight; 5			
1998	Ultra Lightweight TT; 1			
1997	Ultra Lightweight TT; 3			
1993	Ultra Lightweight; 2	Junior TT; 10	Formula One TT; DNF	Senior TT; DNF
1992	Ultra Lightweight; 2	Junior TT; 3	Formula One TT; DNF	Senior TT; 3
1991	Ultra Lightweight; 1	Junior TT; 1	Formula One TT; DNF	Senior TT; 3
1990	Ultra Lightweight TT; 1	Formula 1 TT; 3	Senior TT; DNF	
1989	Ultra Lightweight TT; 1	Formula One TT; 7		
1988	Production Class C 16	Junior TT; DNF	Formula One TT; 13	Senior TT; 12
1987	Production Class D 6	Junior 250cc TT; DNF	Formula Two; 5	
1986	Formula Two; DNF			
1985	Production 100-250cc 6	Junior TT; DNF	Senior TT; 32	
1984	Classic TT; 12	Senior TT; 14		

== Awards ==
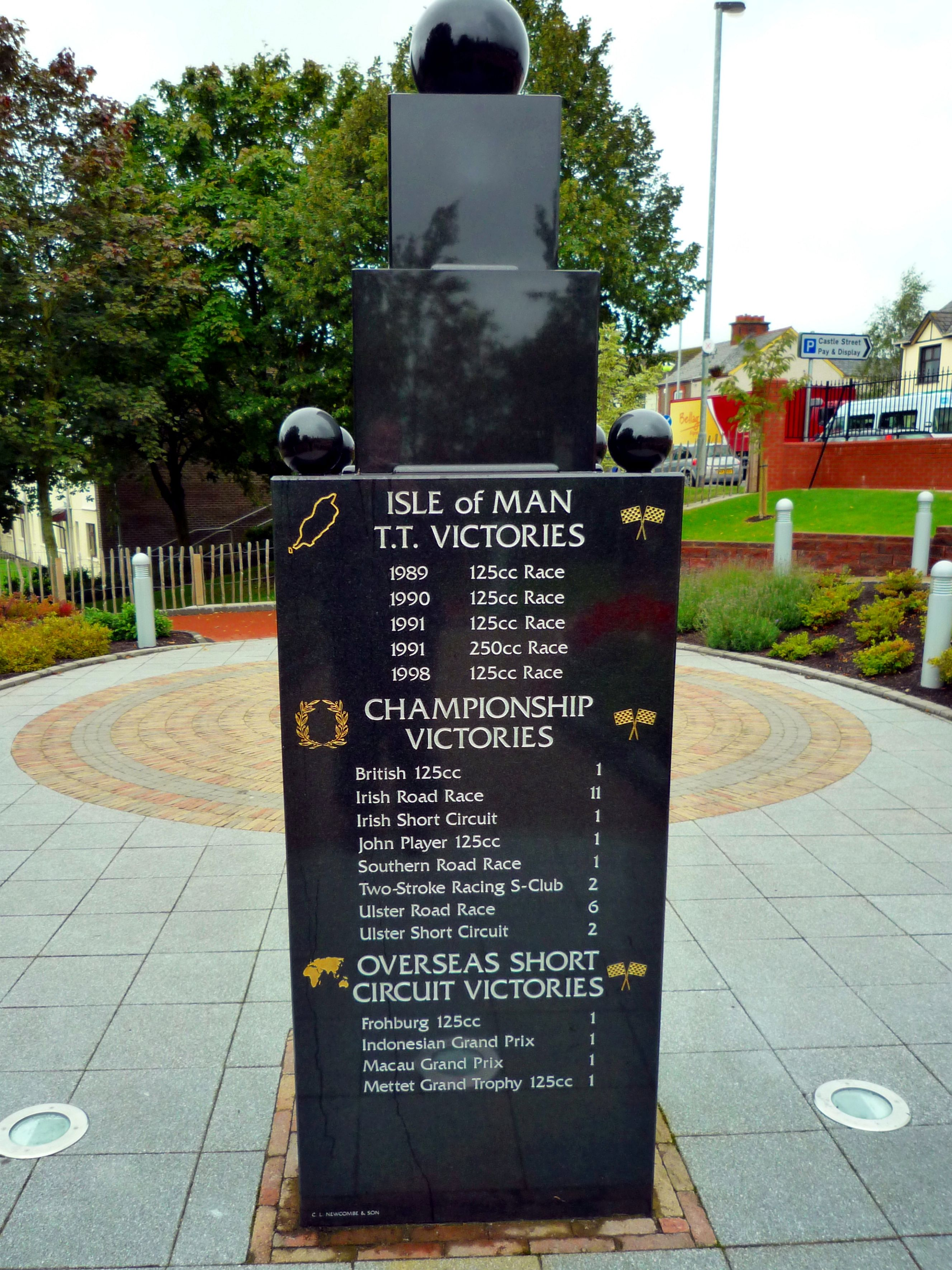
Memorial and gardens at Ballymoney

On 8 February 2005, Dunlop was the first person to be elected to the "Irish Racer Magazine Hall of Fame".

In February 2006, it was announced that Dunlop and his brother Joey were honoured with Honorary Degrees from the University of Ulster, in light of their achievements in the field of motorcycle racing. On 4 July the pair were awarded honorary Doctorate of the University (DUniv) from the University of Ulster in Coleraine.

== Personal life ==
The son of Willie and May Dunlop, he was mentored by close friend Liam Beckett. Married to Louise, the couple had three sons, William, Michael and Daniel. William and Michael both became motorcycle racers.

== Death ==
On 15 May 2008, Dunlop died after suffering severe chest injuries in a crash during a practice session at the North West 200. The fatal accident happened in the 250 cc qualifying as the riders approached the Mather's Cross section of the course. When the engine on his motorcycle seized he mistakenly hit the motorcycle's front brake, which was situated beside the clutch on his specially modified bike, and he was thrown over the handlebars at approximately 155 mph (250 km/h). As he crashed, a following rider, Darren Burns, collided with him and suffered a broken leg and concussion in the accident. Dunlop was taken to Causeway Hospital in Coleraine before succumbing to his injuries shortly after 22:00 local time. Dunlop had been racing in the 250 cc class that year for the first time since the 1994 Isle of Man TT. His son Michael went on to win the race and dedicated the victory to his father.

Dunlop's funeral took place on 18 May at Garryduff Presbyterian Church in his home town of Ballymoney. Thousands of mourners, including political leaders and figures from the world of sport, attended the service. Dunlop was laid to rest beside his brother, Joey.

== See also ==
- Road (2014 film)

== Bibliography ==
- Walker, Jimmy (2008). Robert Dunlop: Life And Times Of A Legend. Gill & Macmillan. ISBN 978-0717145966.

Sporting positions
Preceded by Kevin Schwantz	Macau Motorcycle Grand Prix Winner; 1989	Succeeded by Steve Hislop
