= Road (2014 film) =

2014 British documentary film by Diarmuid Lavery and Michael Hewitt

- Directed by: Diarmuid Lavery; Michael Hewitt
- Written by: Diarmuid Lavery; Michael Hewitt
- Produced by: Diarmuid Lavery; Michael Hewitt
- Starring: Dunlop families
- Narrated by: Liam Neeson
- Cinematography: Mark Garrett
- Edited by: Andrew Tohill
- Music by: Mark Gordon; Richard Hill
- Production companies: Doubleband Films for BBC Northern Ireland
- Distributed by: Generator Entertainment
- Release date: 2014
- Running time: 102 minutes
- Country: Northern Ireland
- Language: English

Road is a 2014 BBC documentary film narrated by Liam Neeson about the Dunlop family from Northern Ireland who dominated motorcycle road racing for twenty years. Northern Ireland and the Isle of Man are almost unique in holding motorcycle races on (closed) public roads.

The film follows the racing careers of Joey Dunlop (1952–2000), who won five consecutive TT Formula One world titles and his brother Robert Dunlop (1960–2008), whose sons Michael (born 1988) and William (1985–2018) were successful road racers.

Joey Dunlop was notable off-track for his humanitarian work among orphanages in the Balkans. He was killed during a race in Tallinn, Estonia, when his bike left the track and crashed into a tree. Robert Dunlop suffered multiple injuries after his rear wheel collapsed during the 1994 Formula One TT, but after two years' rehabilitation returned to racing in the Super Lightweight class on a bike specially modified to accommodate his damaged leg and wrist. He died during a practice lap before the 2008 North West 200.

The film comes to a climax when Michael, a legitimate entry to the 250 cc race of that competition, but against the strong wishes of the organisers, forced his way onto the starting grid on 17 May 2008, two days after the death of his father and the day before the funeral, and won the race.

The film includes footage from the following races:

- North West 200
- Isle of Man TT
- Ulster Grand Prix
- Cookstown 100 Road Races
- Skerries Road Races
- Armoy Road Races
- Killalane Road Races
- Manx Grand Prix, Isle of Man

== Reception ==
Simon Kinnear, in Total Film gave the film four stars, and is quoted as saying "[Road] does for the sport what Senna did for Formula One."

== Home media ==
Madman Entertainment released a DVD of the film in Australia.
