= 1995 Isle of Man TT =

Annual motorcycle racing event

Isle of Man TT Mountain Course

In the 1995 Isle of Man TT, Joey Dunlop won the Senior TT and Lightweight TT events and came second to Phillip McCallen in the Formula I race. Changes were introduced in that the Supersport 66 Race was scrapped, and 600cc machines raced in the Junior TT instead. In addition the Lightweight TT incorporated Supersport 400s and 250cc machines.

== Results ==
=== Race 1 – TT Formula One ===
Rank	Rider	Team	Time	Speed
1	(Northern Ireland) Phillip McCallen	Castrol Honda RC45	1.55.15.8	117.84
2	(Northern Ireland) Joey Dunlop	Castrol Honda RC45	1.55.33.9	117.53
3	(England) Simon Beck	Peachurst Ducati	1.56.25.0	116.67
4	(England) Nick Jefferies	Castrol Honda RC45	1.57.09.9	115.92
5	(England) Steve Ward	Castrol Honda RC45	1.57.44.7	115.35
6	(England) Steve Linsdell	Flitwick Yamaha	1.58.18.1	114.81

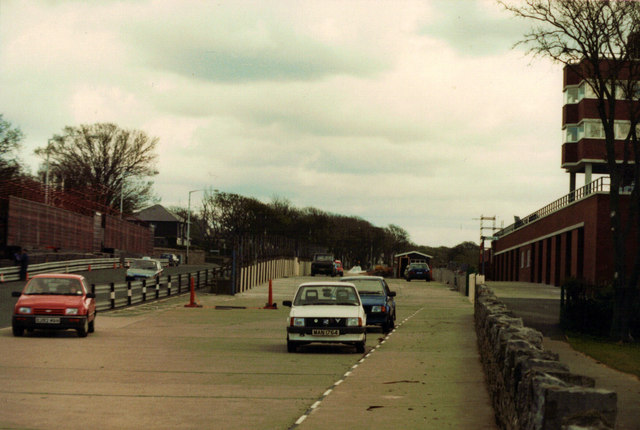
Isle of Man TT course pits several weeks before 1995 practice

=== Race 2 – Sidecar Race A ===
Rank	Rider	Passenger	Team	Time	Speed
1	(England) Rob Fisher	Boyd Hutchinson	Proton Yamaha	1.03.47.1	106.47
2	(England) Mick Boddice	Dave Wells	Castrol Honda	1.04.34.3	105.17
3	(England) Geoff Bell	Nick Roche	PeaWindle Mitsui Yamaha	1.04.59.9	104.48
4	(England) Roy Hanks	Tom Hanks	North Ireson	1.05.05.8	104.32
5	(England) Ian Bell	Craig Hallam	Windle Mitsui Yamaha	1.05.21.3	103.91
6	(England) Kenny Howles	Steve Pointer	Ireson Yamaha	1.05.21.3	103.91

=== Race 3 – Singles TT ===
Rank	Rider	Team	Time	Speed
1	(New Zealand) Robert Holden	Ducati	1.21.44.2	110.78
2	(England) Dave Morris	Chrysalis BMW	1.23.14.5	108.78
3	(England) Steve Linsdell	Flitwick Yamaha	1.24.47.4	106.79
4	Bob Heath	BMR Seeley	1.26.46.8	104.34
5	(England) Robert A Price	Kawasaki	1.28.42.5	102.07
6	(Wales) Nigel Davies	Yamaha	1.29.05.6	101.63

=== Race 4 – Ultra Lightweight ===
Rank	Rider	Team	Time	Speed
1	(England) Mark Baldwin	Padgett Honda	1.24.30.8	107.14
2	(England) Mick Lofthouse	DTR Yamaha	1.24.31.4	107.13
3	(Northern Ireland) James Courtney	IRM Honda	1.24.37.5	107.00
4	(Northern Ireland) Denis McCullough	Francis Neill Honda	1.25.28.3	105.94
5	(England) Noel Clegg	Strongberg Honda	1.27.05.1	103.98
6	(England) Glen English	Honda	1.27.08.2	103.91

=== Race 5 – Lightweight TT ===
Rank	Rider	Team	Time	Speed
1	(Northern Ireland) Joey Dunlop	Castrol Honda	1.18.16.4	115.68
2	(Northern Ireland) James Courtney	IRM Honda	1.18.41.9	115.06
3	(England) Gavin Lee	Yamaha	1.19.07.8	114.43
4	(Northern Ireland) Phillip McCallen	Castrol Honda RC45	1.19.12.5	114.32
5	(New Zealand) Shaun Harris	Honda	1.19.21.6	114.10
6	(Northern Ireland) Denis McCullough	AW Honda	1.19.34.1	113.80

=== Race 6 – Junior TT ===
Rank	Rider	Team	Time	Speed
1	(Scotland) Iain Duffus	V&M Duckhams Honda	1.17.40.4	116.58
2	(England) Nick Jefferies	Castrol Honda	1.18.46.2	114.95
3	(England) Colin Gable	Honda	1.18.59.9	114.62
4	(Northern Ireland) Joey Dunlop	V&M Duckhams Honda	1.19.01.6	114.58
5	(England) Steve Ward	Honda	1.19.08.8	114.41
6	Dave Leach	Kawasaki	1.19.47.2	113.49

=== Race 7 – Sidecar Race B ===
Rank	Rider	Passenger	Team	Time	Speed
1	(England) Rob Fisher	Boyd Hutchinson	Proton Yamaha	1.03.07.5	107.58
2	(Isle of Man) Dave Molyneux	Pete Hill	DMR	1.03.55.8	106.23
3	(England) Mick Boddice	Dave Wells	Castrol Honda	1.04.04.0	106.00
4	(England) Roy Hanks	Tom Hanks	North Ireson	1.04.24.1	105.45
5	(England) Geoff Bell	Nick Roche	Windle Mitsui Yamaha	1.04.43.8	104.91
6	(England) Ian Bell	Craig Hallam	Windle Mitsui Yamaha	1.04.51.6	104.70

=== Race 8 – Senior TT ===
Rank	Rider	Team	Time	Speed
1	(Northern Ireland) Joey Dunlop	Castrol Honda RC45	1.54.01.9	119.11
2	(Scotland) Iain Duffus	Top Gun Ducati	1.54.35.4	118.53
3	(England) Simon Beck	Castrol Honda RC45	1.54.51.7	118.25
4	(England) Nick Jefferies	Castrol Honda RC45	1.54.54.4	118.20
5	David Goodley	Kawasaki	1.56.10.7	116.91
6	(England) Bob Jackson	McAdoo Kawasaki	1.57.05.1	116.00
