= Robert Holden (motorcyclist) =

New Zealand motorcycle racer

- Nationality: New Zealander
- Born: 17 December 1958; Norland, Yorkshire, England
- Died: 31 May 1996 (aged 37); Isle of Man
Motorcycle racing career statistics
Isle of Man TT career
TTs contested	7 (1988–1990, 1992–1995)
TT wins	1
First TT win	1995 Singles TT
Last TT win	1995 Singles TT
TT podiums	2

Robert Lorne Holden (17 December 1958 – 31 May 1996) was a motorcycle road racer from New Zealand.

== Biography ==
Born in Norland, near Sowerby Bridge, Yorkshire in 1958, Holden emigrated from England to New Zealand with his family in 1973.

Holden was the most successful of all Ducati Supermono racers. In 1994, he placed second in the Isle of Man TT, then returned to the 1995 Isle of Man TT to win the singles title. Holden also won in Ireland's North West 200 Supermono class in 1995. Holden died the following year in practice at the Isle of Man TT while riding a Ducati 916.

Holden would ride up to four different machines stepping off his Superbike onto a 250 Production machine then straight onto a 600 sports production bike followed by 15 laps and his Rotax 250 GP bike; it seemed at the time that Holden's only rest was during the sidecar race although he did passenger for Kevin Maxwell for a season of road racing on one. He was helped early on in his career by Steve Dundon from Wellington Motorcycle Centre. The combination of Dundon's experience and technical skills and Holden's hard riding led to many NZ titles.

One of Holden's more famous exploits was known as "The Holden Sign" incident. This happened at the Manfeild Autocourse in Feilding. While leading the Open Production Race on his 1135 GSX Suzuki, he crashed at 200 km/h, the bike slid and cartwheeled through a large sign advertising "Holden" cars. The whole incident was televised and was shown on the 6 o'clock news. Holden was unhurt and walked back to the pits to the applause of the crowd.

Later on in his career, Holden teamed up with retired Ducati racer turned team manager Dallas Rankine. The BMS team supplied Holden with four-valve Ducati 916 motorcycles and a Ducati Supermono. Some of New Zealand's best racing was seen during the early nineties between Holden on the Ducati and Andrew Stroud on the famous Britten V1000. Holden's death at the Isle of Man in 1996 was a devastating loss for New Zealand racing. Dallas Rankine withdrew from all professional involvement in racing after losing his rider and close friend.

The Robert Holden Memorial feature race at the famous Cemetery Circuit meeting in Wanganui, New Zealand is named in his honour.
