= Phillip McCallen =

British motorcycle racer

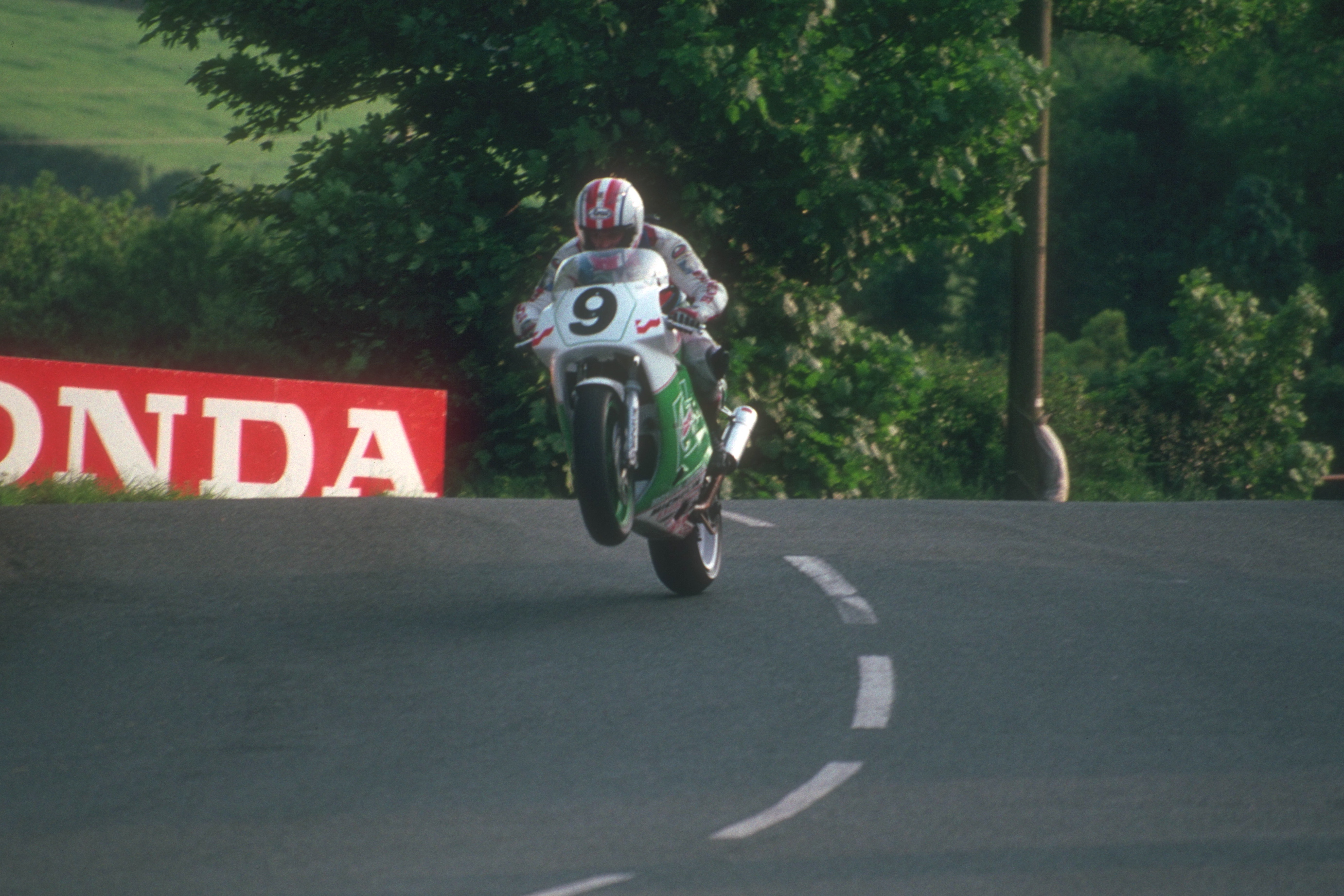
- Phillip in 1992 on his Honda RC30 at Ballaugh Bridge.
- Nationality: Northern Irish
- Born: Portadown, Armagh
Motorcycle racing career statistics
Isle of Man TT career
TTs contested	11 (1989 - 1999)
TT wins	11
First TT win	1992 Formula One TT
Last TT win	1997 Senior TT
TT podiums	19

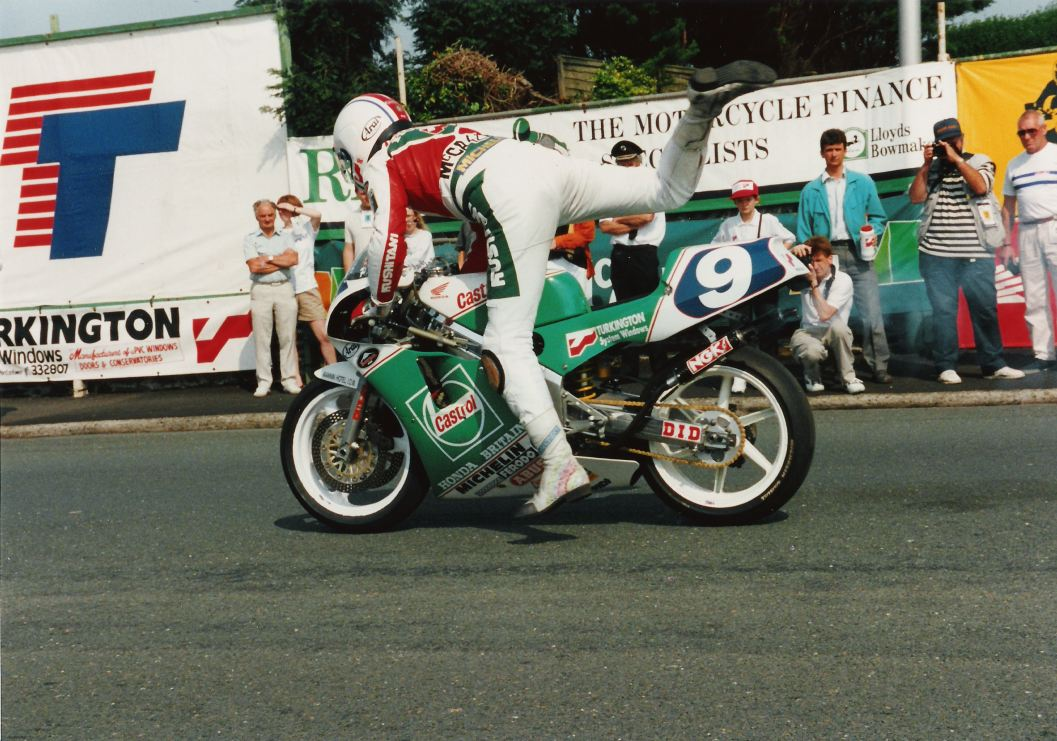
McCallen at the start of the 1992 Isle of Man TT

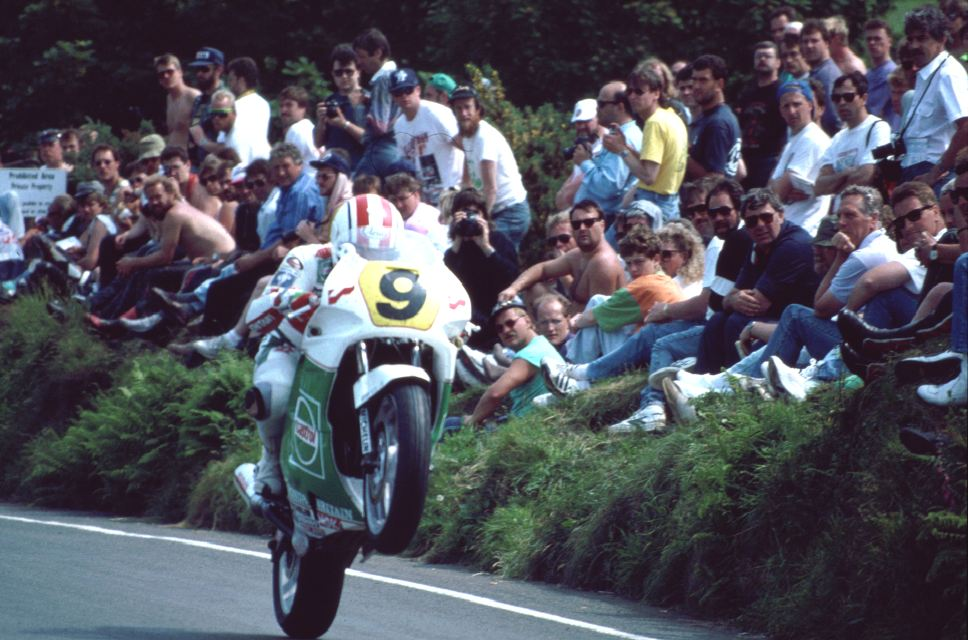
McCallen at Gooseneck on the 1992 Isle of Man TT

Phillip McCallen (born Portadown, Armagh) is a Northern Ireland born former motorcycle racer, now turned to dealer and commentator in his retirement from road racing.

McCallen is joint eleventh in the list of all-time Isle of Man TT winners, with 11 race victories, including four races in one week in 1996; a tally which stood unbroken until 2010, when Ian Hutchinson won five races in a week. McCallen also won five wins from six starts at the 1992 North West 200, and five wins in one day at the 1996 Ulster Grand Prix.

== Biography ==
McCallen was born within yards of the Tandragee road racing circuit.

=== Isle of Man TT ===
McCallen is joint eighth in the list of all-time Isle of Man TT winners, with 11 race victories to his name. His first race was in 1988 at the Manx Grand Prix, the amateur equivalent of the TT. The 1996 Isle of Man TT was the year where McCallen riding a Honda achieved four wins in a week, winning all of the main races with Jim Moodie and Joey Dunlop picking up the smaller bike wins.

=== Later career ===
McCallen rode his entire career for Honda (except the last TT in 1999, when he signed up with Yamaha), and during his career was employed working on research and development in conjunction with Honda. In the later stages of his career, McCallen became general after sales manager for one of the UK's leading motorcycle retailers. McCallen now owns a successful motorcycle dealership in Lisburn, specialising in Kawasaki and KTM bikes.

== Racing record ==
=== Complete Isle of Man TT record ===
1999	Formula One TT; DNF	Junior TT; 7	Production TT; 3			
1997	Formula One TT; 1	Junior TT; 2	Production TT; 1	Lightweight TT; DNF	Senior TT; 1	
1996	Formula One TT; 1	Junior TT; 1	Production TT; 1	Lightweight TT; 4	Senior TT; 1	
1995	Formula One TT; 1	Junior TT; DNF	Lightweight TT; 4			
1994	Formula One TT; 2	Junior TT; DNF	Supersport 600 TT; 4	Senior TT; 2		
1993	Formula One TT; 2	Junior TT; DNF	Supersport 600 TT; 7	Senior TT; 1		
1992	Formula One TT; 1	Junior TT; DNF	Supersport 600 TT; 1	Supersport 400 TT; 2	Senior TT; DNF	
1991	Formula One TT; 4	Junior TT; 2	Supersport 600 TT; 5	Ultra Lightweight TT; 4	Senior TT; 3	
1990	Formula One TT; 39	Junior TT; 6	Supersport 600 TT; 14	Senior TT; DNF		
1989	Formula One TT; 15	Junior TT; DNF	Supersport 600 TT; 28	Production 750 TT; 15	Ultra Lightweight TT; 7	Senior TT; 17

== Records ==
- Tied eleventh in the list of all-time Isle of Man TT winners, with 11 race victories
- Held the lap record at Oliver's Mount, the Scarborough, North Yorkshire venue for the annual Auto66 club event, from 1994 until 2004. It was broken by Guy Martin.

== Bibliography ==
- McCallen, Phillip; Woods, Phil (19 March 2021). Supermac. Aureus Publishing Limited. ISBN 978-1899750504.

Sporting positions
Preceded by Mike Edwards	Macau Motorcycle Grand Prix Winner; 1996	Succeeded by Andreas Hofmann
