= Steve Hislop =

Scottish motorcycle racer (1962–2003)

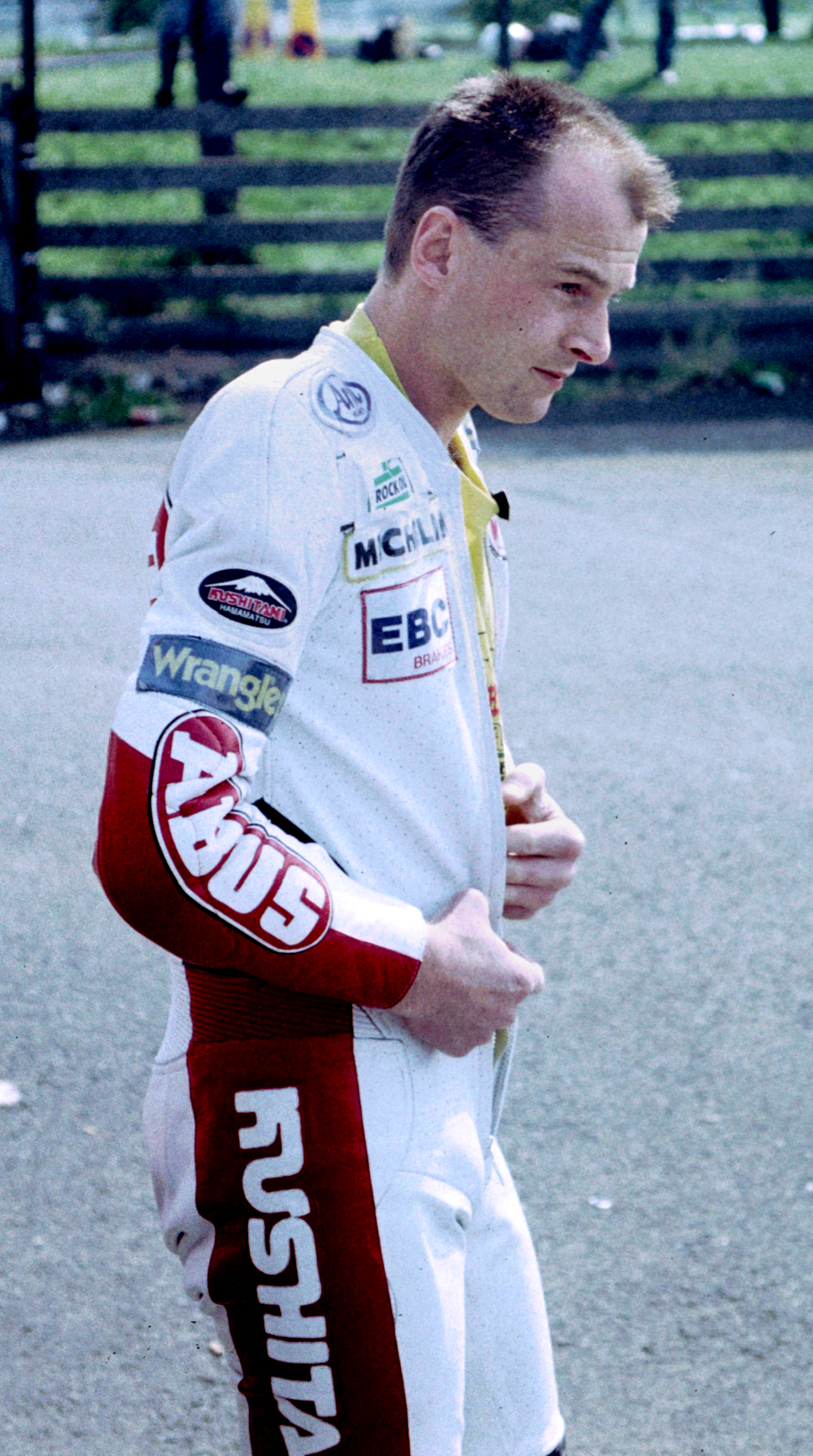
- Hislop in 1992
- Nationality: British
- Born: 11 January 1962; Hawick, Scotland
- Died: 30 July 2003 (aged 41); Teviothead, Scotland
Motorcycle racing career statistics
British Superbike Championship
Active years	1995, 1998, 2002
Manufacturers	Yamaha
Championships	2 (1995, 2002)
Starts / Wins / Podiums / Poles / F. laps / Points; 0 / 0 / 0 / 0 / 0 / 0
Isle of Man TT career
TTs contested	11 (1984 – 1994)
TT wins	11
First TT win	1987 Formula 2 TT
Last TT win	1994 Senior TT
TT podiums	19

Robert Steven Hislop (11 January 1962 – 30 July 2003) was a Scottish motorcycle racer. Hislop won at the Isle of Man TT eleven times, was the British 250cc Champion (1990) and lifted the British Superbike championship on two occasions (1995 and 2002).

Hislop died when piloting his Robinson R44 helicopter in July 2003. He was inducted into the Scottish Sports Hall of Fame in March 2010.

== Biography ==
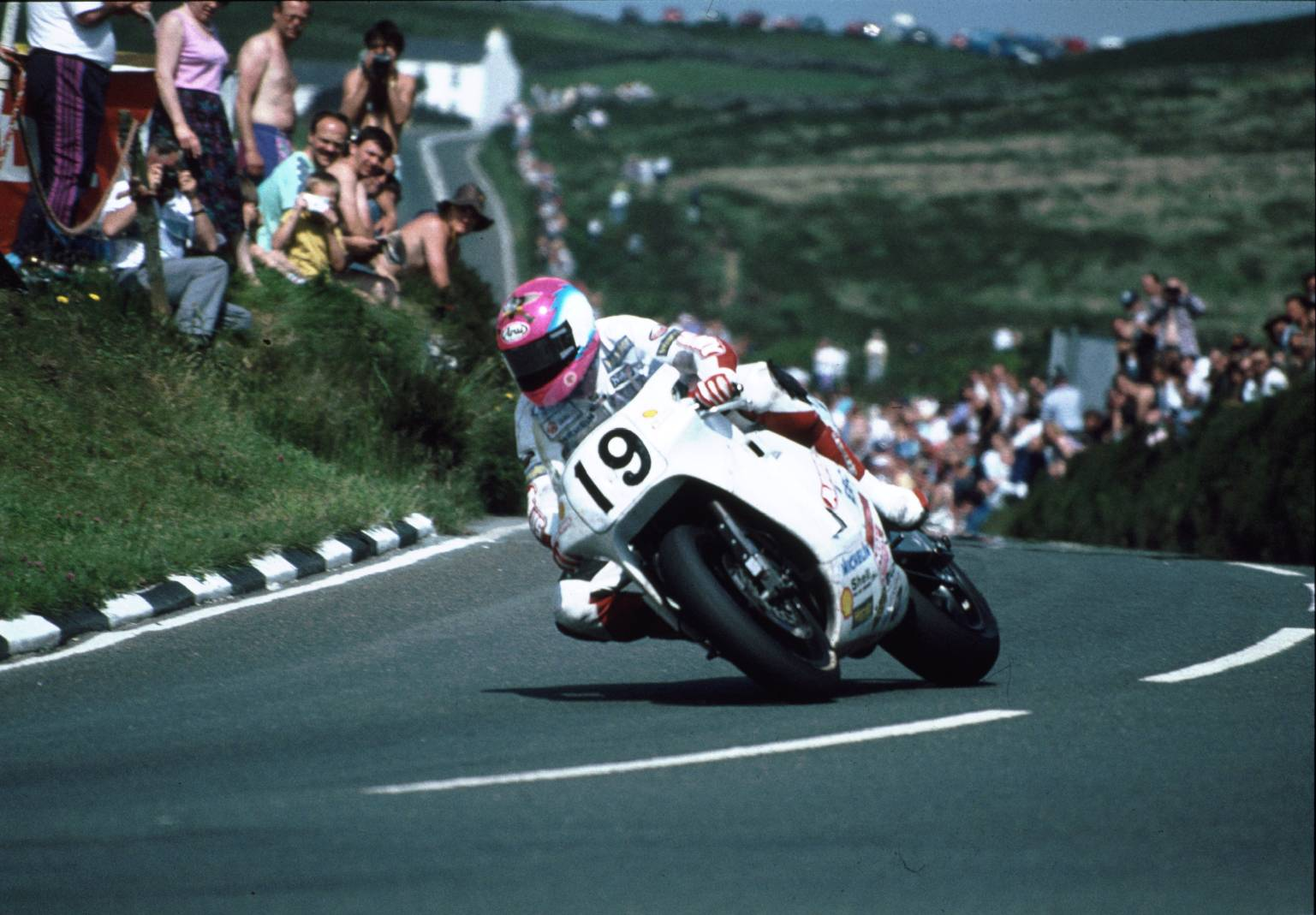
Hislop on the Norton 588 at Creg-ny-Baa, Isle of Man in 1992

Hislop was born into a close, Scottish Borders family. He grew up in the village of Chesters near the town of Hawick with his father Sandy, mother Margaret and younger brother Garry [his best friend]. Sandy encouraged his boys to be enthusiastic about competitive motorcycling and take up racing. However, when Garry was killed in a racing accident at Silloth circuit in 1982 aged 19, Hislop's enthusiasm waned and he slumped into an alcohol fuelled depression (the death of his father three years earlier from a heart attack may also have contributed).

== Racing career ==
=== Isle of Man TT ===
Hislop began his Isle of Man road racing career in 1983 by finishing second in the newcomers' race at the Manx Grand Prix.

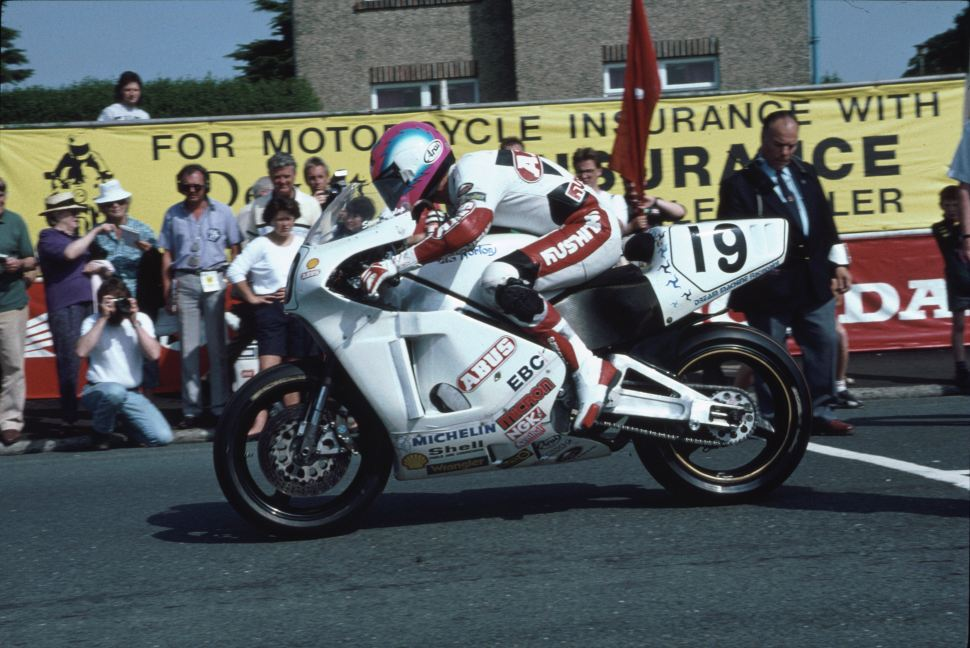
Hislop on the Norton at TT races startline

The 1992 Senior TT is often described as one of the best races in TT history. Hislop was on Ron Haslam's Norton 588. Hislop's took to the circuit in the unconventional white livery of long-term sponsor Abus. He came a good second in the opening TT F1 race, with the bike proving it could complete six laps of the gruelling Snaefell Mountain Course in hot weather.

A number of adjustments had been made to the Norton prior to the Senior TT: a larger screen was fitted to protect Hislop from the high winds, the front mudguard was removed to admit more cooling air to the engine and protective covers were fitted to the front forks.

Hislop's main rival was Carl Fogarty, who started at number four. Hislop started at 19. This give the Scot more traffic to contend with but the time difference between the two never exceeded 7.4 seconds. The two riders smashed records they had set the previous year, with Hislop taking a narrow advantage into the final lap. In a last-ditch attempt to catch Hislop, Fogarty recorded a record lap time of more than 123 mph on his Yamaha. It was all in vain, however, as Hislop guided the Norton home in first place – one of Hislop's greatest achievement in his last battle with Fogarty.

=== Short circuits ===
On short circuits, Hislop's first championship success came when he won the 250cc British Championship in 1990. Superbike victory followed with the British Superbike Championship in 1995. Although he did not take a BSB victory in 1996 or 1997, Hislop was hired by Rob McElnea strong Cadbury's Boost Yamaha team for 1998. The nature of the fight for the championship between Hislop and team-mate Niall Mackenzie was illustrated by a near-collision on the last lap at Snetterton, which cost the team a 1–2 finish. Hislop generally matched his countryman before an injurious crash took him out of title contention.

Hislop's last championship success came in 2002 when he won the British Superbike Championship riding a Ducati. A notable feature of his season resulted from Hislop lapping Donington Park circuit more quickly on a superbike than the fastest Moto GP machine: Hislop's modified production Ducati was heavier and less powerful than the bespoke Grand Prix bikes.

== Personal life ==
Hislop had two children by former partner Kelly Bailey, the first called Aaron Hislop but the couple split just before his second son Connor was born. He had joint custody of the children, and had found love again with girlfriend Ally Greenwood.

Hislop died in a helicopter accident near Teviothead, Roxburghshire and was interred in the village of Chesters near his birthplace of Hawick, Scotland.

=== Legacy ===
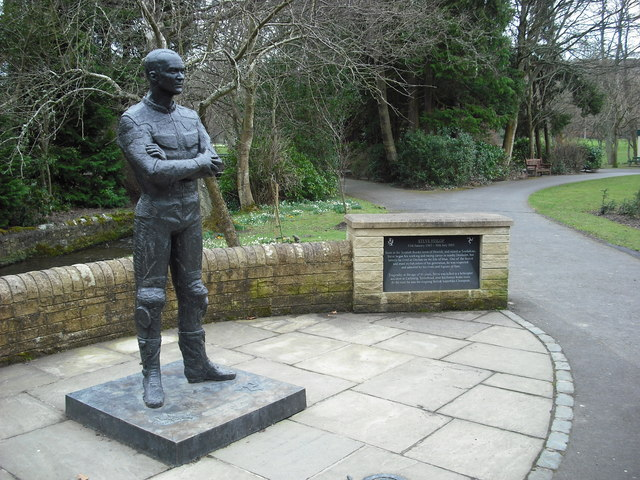
Hislop bronze memorial at Wilton Park, Hawick

- Knickerbrook Chicane at the Oulton Park circuit in Cheshire was renamed "Hislops Chicane" following re-development over the 2003 winter period.
- There is a bronze statue in memory of Hislop on Onchan Head, Isle of Man
- There is a bronze statue in memory of Hizzy in Wilton park, Hawick, near his hometown of Denholm. It is unusual as it is a life-sized image of Hizzy in his leathers and is mounted at ground level.
- Hislop has a museum room all about him at Wilton park. It displays trophies, some of Hislop's bikes and leathers. It also has x-rays taken after Hizzy broke his neck.
- There is an Annual Hizzy Run which Starts and finishes in Denholm Green. The run was started in 2003 by fellow racer and friend Alan Duffus to raise money for the bronze statues which were put in place 2005. The Run is still going and regularly attracts hundreds of bikers who listen to speeches made by friends and fellow racers.

== Career statistics ==
=== British Superbike Championship ===
Year	Bike	1		2		3		4		5		6		7		8		9		10		11		12		13		Pos	Pts
Year	Bike	R1	R2	R1	R2	R1	R2	R1	R2	R1	R2	R1	R2	R1	R2	R1	R2	R1	R2	R1	R2	R1	R2	R1	R2	R1	R2	Pos	Pts
2001	Ducati	DON; 2	DON; 5	SIL; 2	SIL; 1	SNE; 2	SNE; 2	OUL; 1	OUL; 1	BRH; 1	BRA; 1	THR; 1	THR; 6	OUL; 1	OUL; 1	KNO; 3	KNO; 2	CAD; 1	CAD; 1	BRH; 1	BRH; 2	MAL; 3	MAL; 1	ROC; Ret	ROC; DNS	DON	DON	2nd	475

== Bibliography ==
- Hislop, Steve (2003). Hizzy: The Autobiography of Steve Hislop. CollinsWillow. ISBN 978-0007156405.

Sporting positions
Preceded by Robert Dunlop	Macau Motorcycle Grand Prix Winner; 1990	Succeeded by Didier de Radiguès
Preceded by Carl Fogarty	Macau Motorcycle Grand Prix Winner; 1993–1994	Succeeded by Mike Edwards
