= 1996 Isle of Man TT =

Annual motorcycle racing event

Isle of Man TT Mountain Course

The 1996 Isle of Man TT was the year where Phillip McCallen of Honda achieved 4 wins in a week – a record not beaten until 2010. He won all of the main races with Jim Moodie and Joey Dunlop picking up the smaller bike wins.

Dave Molyneux managed to hold off Rob Fisher to win both sidecar races.

John McGuinness and David Jefferies, two of the most successful competitors in the event's history, made their debut that year. Jefferies scored a best of tenth place at the Production TT, while McGuinness finished in fifteenth place in the Lightweight TT, his only start of the week.

The event was marred by the death of four competitors: Aaron Kennedy, Rob Holden and Mick Lofthouse during practice, and Steve Tannock during the Formula One TT. Holden and Lofthouse were both former TT podium finishers.

== Results ==
- Race 1 – TT Formula One Race (6 laps – 226.38 miles)

Rank	Rider	Team	Time	Gap
1	(Northern Ireland) Phillip McCallen	Honda Britain RC45	1.56.54.1	
2	(England) Nick Jefferies	Honda Britain RC45	1.57.44.7	+ 50.6
3	(England) Michael Rutter	McCullough Ducati	1.58.12.2	+ 1:18.1
4	(Scotland) Iain Duffus	V&M Honda RC45	1.58.20.8	+ 1:26.7
5	(Isle of Man) Jason Griffiths	Morris Honda Britain	1.59.27.2	+ 2:33.1
6	(England) Mark Flynn	Manton Kawasaki	1.59.47.8	+ 2:53.7

- Race 2 – Sidecar Race A (3 laps – 113.19miles)

Rank	Rider	Passenger	Team	Time	Gap
1	(Isle of Man) Dave Molyneux	Pete Hill	DMR	1.01.50.6	
2	(England) Rob Fisher	Boyd Hutchinson	Baker Yamaha	1.03.07.4	+ 1:16.8
3	(England) Kenny Howles	Steve Pointer	Ireson Mist Yamaha	1.04.03.8	+ 2:13.2
4	(England) Geoff Bell	Craig Hallam	Windle Yamaha	1.04.15.2	+ 2:24.6
5	(England) Mick Boddice	Dave Wells	Ireson Honda	1.04.43.9	+ 2:53.3
6	(Isle of Man) Graham Hayne	Michael Craig	DMR	1:05.24.3	+ 3:33.7

- Race 3 – Lightweight 250 TT Race (3 laps – 226.38 miles)

Rank	Rider	Team	Time	Gap
1	(Northern Ireland) Joey Dunlop	Honda Britain RC250	1.18.31.5	
2	(Scotland) Jim Moodie	Honda	1.18.37.2	+ 5.7
3	(Isle of Man) Jason Griffiths	Morris Honda Britain	1.20.11.4	+ 1:39.9
4	(Northern Ireland) Phillip McCallen	Padgett Honda	1.20.20.8	+ 1:49.3
5	(Wales) Nigel Davies	Padgett Yamaha	1.20.22.0	+ 1:50.5
6	(Northern Ireland) Denis McCullough	AW Honda	1.20.23.1	+ 1:51.6

- Race 4 – Sidecar Race B (3 laps – 113.19 miles)

Rank	Rider	Passenger	Team	Time	Gap
1	(Isle of Man) Dave Molyneux	Pete Hill	DMR	1.01.34.8	
2	(England) Rob Fisher	Boyd Hutchinson	Baker Yamaha	1.03.15.8	+ 1:41.0
3	(England) Kenny Howles	Steve Pointer	Ireson Mist Yamaha	1.03.57.5	+ 2:22.7
4	(England) Geoff Bell	Craig Hallam	Windle Yamaha	1.04.12.1	+ 2:37.3
5	(England) Richard Crossley	Rick Long	Windle Yamaha	1.04.20.1	+ 2:45.3
6	John Childs	Sadie Childs	Honda	1.05.14.5	+ 3:39.7

- Race 5 – Ultra Lightweight 125 TT(2 laps – ? miles)

Rank	Rider	Team	Time	Gap
1	(Northern Ireland) Joey Dunlop	Honda	42.34.6	
2	(England) Gavin Lee	Honda	42.38.4	+ 3.8
3	(England) Glen English	Beale Honda	42.47.3	+ 12.7
4	(Wales) Ian Lougher	JWS	43.09.1	+ 34.5
5	Bob Heath	Appleyard Honda	43.17.1	+ 42.5
6	(Northern Ireland) Gary Dynes	Honda	44.07.9	+ 1:33.3

- Race 6 – Singles TT (2 laps – ? miles)

Rank	Rider	Team	Time	Gap
1	(Scotland) Jim Moodie	Bird Yamaha 684	41.50.7	
2	(England) Dave Morris	Chrysalis BMW	42.00.7	+ 10.0
3	(England) Bob Jackson	BRS 800	43.13.4	+ 1:22.7
4	(Germany) Johannes Kehrer	MUZ 660	43.45.6	+ 1:54.9
5	(United States) Craig McLean	Ducati	43.54.3	+ 2:03.6
6	Alan Bushell	Suzuki 800	44.11.1	+ 2:20.4

- Race 7 – Junior TT 600cc (3 laps – ? miles)

Rank	Rider	Team	Time	Gap
1	(Northern Ireland) Phillip McCallen	Honda	57.43.4	
2	(Scotland) Iain Duffus	V&M Honda	58.01.3	+ 17.9
3	(Scotland) Ian Simpson	V&M Honda	58.22.1	+ 38.7
4	(England) Colin Gable	Honda	58.54.8	+ 1:11.4
5	(Isle of Man) Jason Griffiths	Morris Honda Britain	59.06.2	+ 1:22.8
6	(Wales) Nigel Davies	Kawasaki	59.08.4	+ 1:25.0

- Race 8 – Production TT

Rank	Rider	Team	Time	Gap
1	(Northern Ireland) Phillip McCallen	Honda CBR900RR	57.53.1	
2	(Scotland) Iain Duffus	V&M Honda CBR900RR	57.59.2	+ 6.1
3	(England) Michael Rutter	V&M Yamaha R1	58.18.2	+ 25.1
4	(England) Colin Gable	Honda CBR900RR	58.32.4	+ 39.3
5	(England) Lee Pullan	Yamaha	58.53.5	+ 1:00.4
6	(Northern Ireland) Derek Young	Total Honda Fireblade	59.03.2	+ 1:10.1

- Race 9 – Senior TT Race (6 laps – 226.38 miles)

Rank	Rider	Team	Time	Gap
1	(Northern Ireland) Phillip McCallen	Honda Britain RC45	1.53.24.8	
2	(Northern Ireland) Joey Dunlop	Honda Britain RC45	1.54.37.2	+ 1:12.4
3	(England) Nick Jefferies	Honda Britain RC45	1.54.39.1	+ 1:14.3
4	(England) Bob Jackson	McAdoo Kawasaki	1.54.49.3	+ 1:24.5
5	(England) Lee Pullan	Yamaha	1.54.58.7	+ 1:33.9
6	(Northern Ireland) Derek Young	Tillston Honda	1.55.55.2	+ 2:30.4
