= Ian Simpson (motorcyclist) =

British motorcycle racer

- Nationality: British
- Born: 1970 (age 55–56); Edinburgh, Scotland
Motorcycle racing career statistics
Isle of Man TT career
TTs contested	6 (1989, 1993-1994, 1996-1998)
TT wins	3
First TT win	1997 Junior TT
Last TT win	1998 Formula One TT
TT podiums	8

Ian Simpson (born 1970 in Edinburgh) is a retired motorcycle road racer from Scotland, nicknamed the "Dalbeattie Destroyer".

== Career ==
Simpson began racing at the age of 16, and entered the British Championship two years later. He won the TT Superbike class in the 1994 HEAT British Supercup (now known as the British Superbike Championship) on a Duckhams Crighton Norton, the final year Rotary Nortons were raced at this level; as new homoglation rules required that a larger number of road-going bikes were produced than Norton could afford. Other British titles won by Simpson were in Supersport, taking the 600cc Supercup championships in 1991 and 1994, and the 400cc national championship in 1993. He was Production Powerbike champion in 1997. Simpson also won 3 Isle of Man TT and 5 North West 200 races (including the Superbike class in 1995, 1996 and 1998). He won the very last TT race he competed in, the 1998 Senior TT.

Simpson was injury prone, breaking both legs four times. It was a repeat of these injuries which caused him to retire in 2001, having narrowly escaped needing to have his right leg amputated. He later opened a sporting goods shop, managed the ETI Racing team, and competed in a handful of rallies, and has done racing tuition. He made a one-off comeback in the International Classic Grand Prix race at the 2008 North West 200.
