= Steve Linsdell =

British motorcycle racer

- Nationality: (United Kingdom) British
- Born: 1955 (age 70–71); Westoning, England
Motorcycle racing career statistics
Isle of Man TT career
TTs contested	18 (1986-1989, 1991-2000, 2002-2004, 2007)
TT wins	0
TT podiums	7

Steve Linsdell (born 1955) is a British former professional motorcycle road racer. He specialized in a branch of road racing known as traditional road racing held on street circuits such as the North West 200 and the Ulster Grand Prix.

== Motorcycle racing career ==
Born in Westoning, Bedfordshire, Linsdell was notable for his achievements aboard unlikely machines and in the Isle of Man TT. He began motorcycle racing in 1977 on a hand-built 350cc Royal Enfield Bullet - a machine not commonly recognized as a race bike. However, he soon silenced sceptics after coming second in his first ever race. After this he had a virtual clean sweep over the next two seasons - adding a 700cc Royal Enfield as a second ride in 1978. His early results had him club champion at the Vintage Racing Motorcycle Club aboard his Royal Enfields. For several years he was said, in documents such as the Motor Cycle News, to be almost unbeatable.

Linsdell aboard the only two stroke at the 2007 Centenary TT.

For 1981, Linsdell built up a 1959 engined 500cc Royal Enfield Bullet, mounted in a Colin Seeley frame, to compete in the unlimited single cylinder Kenning "S" series, and to make his debut at the Isle of Man Manx Grand Prix. He was moderately successful on this bike on the short circuits, but it was in the Isle of Man that he stunned his opposition and all spectators by finishing in an astonishing second place in the newcomer's race at an average speed of 94.87 mph. This was despite competing against machines over 20 years newer. Linsdell is still the last ever Royal Enfield racer to stand on the Isle of Man podium.

After his debut, Linsdell went on to many more successes on the TT circuit at the Isle of Man aboard some very unusual machinery. Some notable performances include sixth place in the Formula One main race at the 1995 Isle of Man TT on a hub centre steered Yamaha GTS - definitely not a racing machine - and in the 1996 Isle of Man TT setting the fastest ever lap on a British bike at over 114 mph on a Saxon-framed Triumph. This record stood until 2003, when New Zealander Bruce Anstey broke it.

More recently, Linsdell rode the only two stroke at the Centenary 2007 Isle of Man TT, on board a rare 500cc former GP bike - an Italian Paton from 2001. However, mechanical failure caused him to stop after two laps of the race. He finished second in the 2006 Senior Classic Manx Grand Prix on a 1968 Paton BIC 500 four stroke and in 2007 finished third behind TT winners Ryan Farquhar and Chris Palmer, in a race which saw the top three all break the ten-year-old 500 Classic lap record.

== Other road racing ==
Away from the Isle of Man, Linsdell has also had success at other road races, such as the North West 200 and the Ulster Grand Prix. Of particular significance is the 1992 North West 200 where he had a hard-fought three way scrap with Phillip McCallen to eventually finish second - widely remembered as one of the best ever races at the North West 200.

Linsdell also scored points in various rounds of the Formula TT world championship, beating many regulars on home backed machinery.

== Present day and the future ==
Linsdell has started to take a back seat in order to help his son Olie Linsdell, in his racing career. Olie has enjoyed notable success on the road circuits himself, with a win at the North West 200 International Races 2007, and a double win at his debut at the Isle of Man Manx Grand Prix in 2007.

Linsdell is featured on the TT Superbike Legends PlayStation 2 game, which was developed by Jester Interactive and released in November 2008.
