= Joey Dunlop =

Northern Irish motorcycle racer (1952–2000)

Joey Dunlop OBE
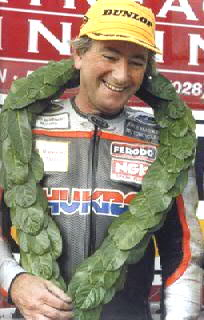
- Dunlop at the TT races
- Born: 25 February 1952; Unshinagh, County Antrim, Northern Ireland
- Died: 2 July 2000 (aged 48); Tallinn, Estonia
- Other names: King of the Roads, Yer Man
- Nationality: British
- Bike number: 3
Motorcycle racing career statistics
Isle of Man TT career
TTs contested	102 (1976–2000)
TT wins	26
First TT win	1977 Jubilee Classic
Last TT win	2000 Ultra-Lightweight 125 TT
TT podiums	41

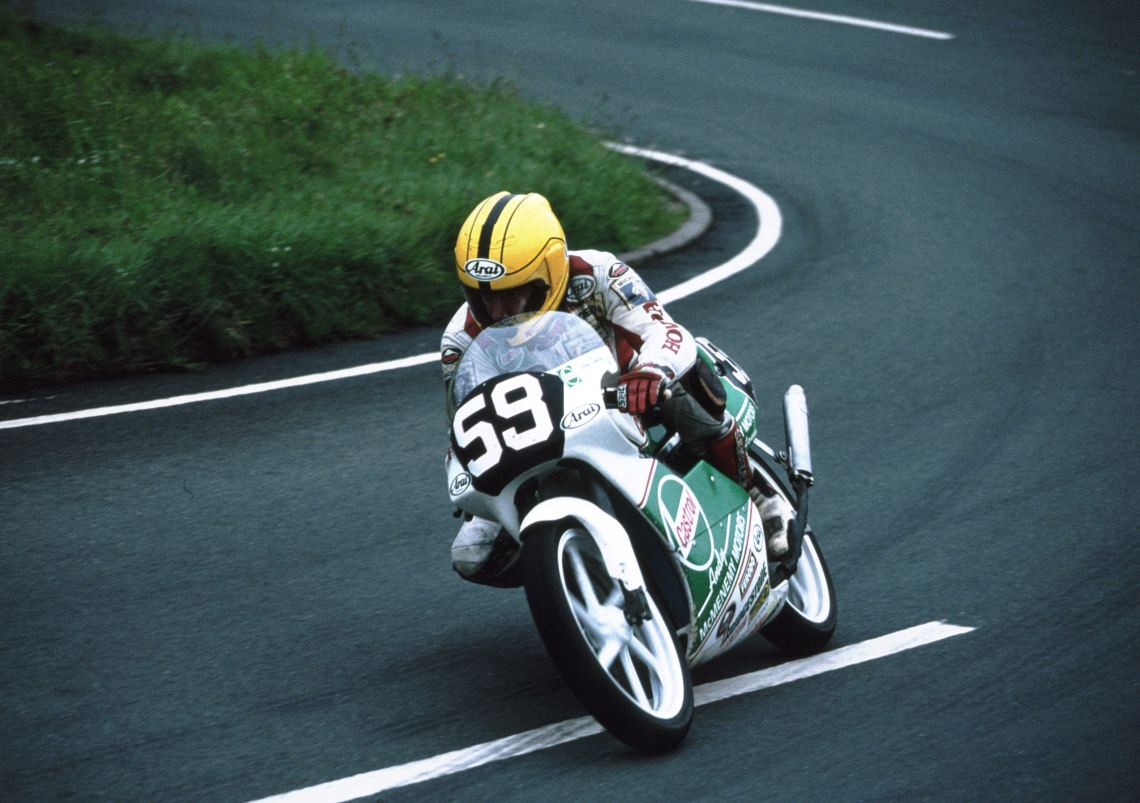
Dunlop on a Honda RS125 exiting the Gooseneck, a bend at the start of the mountain section of the Isle of Man TT course

William Joseph Dunlop (25 February 1952 – 2 July 2000) was a Northern Irish roadracing motorcyclist from Ballymoney, County Antrim. In 2015, he was voted Northern Ireland's greatest-ever sports star.

Dunlop lies second on the list of all-time victories at the Isle of Man TT Races. During the course of his career, Dunlop secured a total 26 race wins at the TT, including three hat-tricks, and 24 wins at the Ulster Grand Prix.

Dunlop was awarded the MBE in 1986 for his contributions to the sport and the OBE in 1996 for his humanitarian work in Romanian orphanages. After his death, the Joey Dunlop Foundation was established to provide accommodation for disabled visitors to the Isle of Man. Dunlop's legacy includes the "Joey Dunlop Cup", awarded to the most successful rider at the annual TT races, and several memorials and statues in his honour. Dunlop's career was documented in several films.

== Career ==
Dunlop won his third hat trick at the Isle of Man TT in 2000 and set his fastest lap on the course of 123.87 mph in the Senior race, which he finished third. In 2005, he was voted through Motorcycle News as the fifth greatest motorcycling icon ever, behind Valentino Rossi. His achievements include three hat-tricks at the Isle of Man TT meeting (1985, 1988 and 2000), where he won a record 26 races in total. A curve at the 26th milestone on the Isle of Man was named in his honour.

Along with Frank Kennedy, Mervyn Robinson and Jim Dunlop, he was one of the "Armoy Armada" quartet of 1970s motorcycle racers from Armoy, County Antrim.

During his career, Dunlop won the Ulster Grand Prix 24 times. In 1986, he won a fifth consecutive TT Formula One world title; initially based on one race at the Isle of Man TT after the loss of World Championship status from 1977-onwards and organised by the Auto-Cycle Union, the title was eventually expanded to take in more rounds in other countries.

Dunlop was awarded the MBE in 1986 for his services to the sport, and in 1996, he was awarded the OBE for his humanitarian work for children in Romanian orphanages, to which he had delivered clothing and food. Dunlop has featured in documentary films regarding his career: V Four Victory (1983), Joey – The Man Who Conquered the TT (2013) and Road (2014).

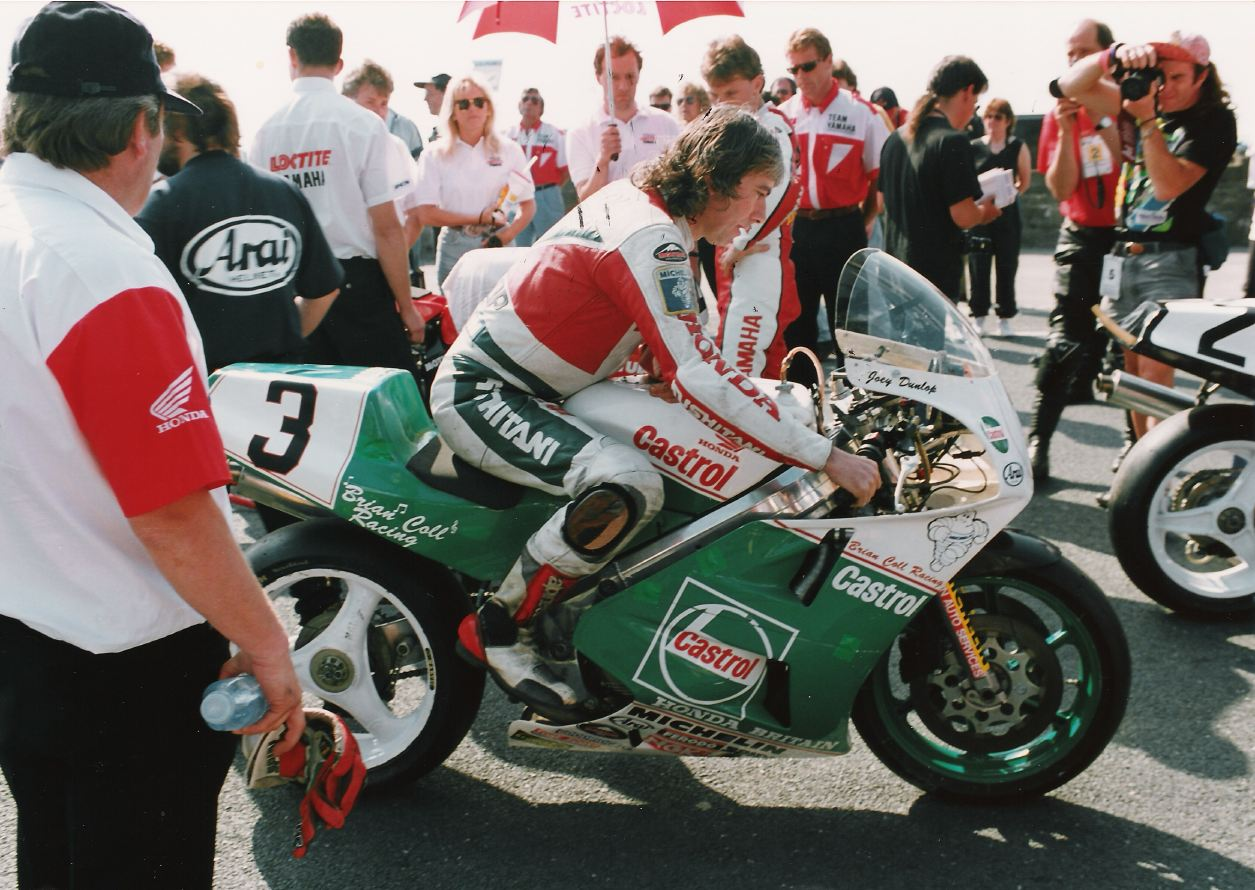
Senior TT in 1992

== Charity work and recognition ==
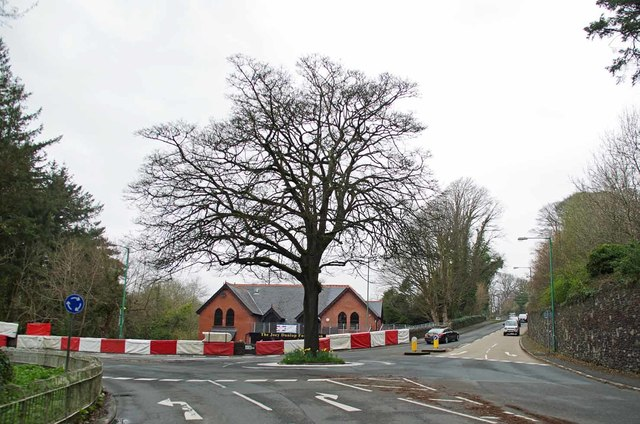
Joey Dunlop Foundation building at Braddan Bridge, Douglas, Isle of Man

Dunlop helped orphans in the Balkans, driving a van loaded with supplies to orphanages in Romania, Albania and Bosnia-Herzegovina before the annual racing season began. In 1996, he received an OBE for his humanitarian work.

After Dunlop's death, the Joey Dunlop Foundation was introduced, a charity that provides appropriate accommodation for disabled visitors to the Isle of Man.

On 30 January 2015, Dunlop was voted Northern Ireland's greatest sports star by readers of the Belfast Telegraph newspaper.

== Shipwreck ==
On the night of 23 May 1985, Dunlop was travelling from Northern Ireland to the Isle of Man for the annual TT races by sea, on board the Tornamona, a former fishing boat. The vessel had departed from Strangford, County Down, with Dunlop, other riders, racing bikes and equipment on board. Strong currents into Strangford Lough pushed the Tornamona onto St Patrick's Rock, where her rudder broke off in a crevice. The boat sank and all 13 passengers and crew were rescued by the Portaferry Lifeboat. The bikes were later recovered by divers.

== Personal life ==
Dunlop married Linda Patterson on 22 September 1972 at Ballymoney register office. The couple had five children. He owned a pub in Ballymoney and was known for his superstitions, including wearing a red T-shirt and his yellow crash helmet when racing. In 1993, Ballymoney Borough Council awarded him the Freedom of the Borough.

== Death ==
Dunlop died on 2 July 2000 in Tallinn, Estonia, while leading a 125cc race; he had already won the 750cc and 600cc events on the Pirita-Kose-Kloostrimetsa Circuit. He appeared to lose control of his bike in the wet conditions and died instantly on impact with trees. As a mark of respect, the Estonian government's official website was replaced with a tribute to Dunlop within hours of his death. Northern Ireland television carried live coverage of his funeral. Fifty thousand mourners, including bikers from all parts of Britain and Ireland and people from all backgrounds in Northern Ireland, attended the funeral procession to Garryduff Presbyterian church and his burial in the adjoining graveyard.

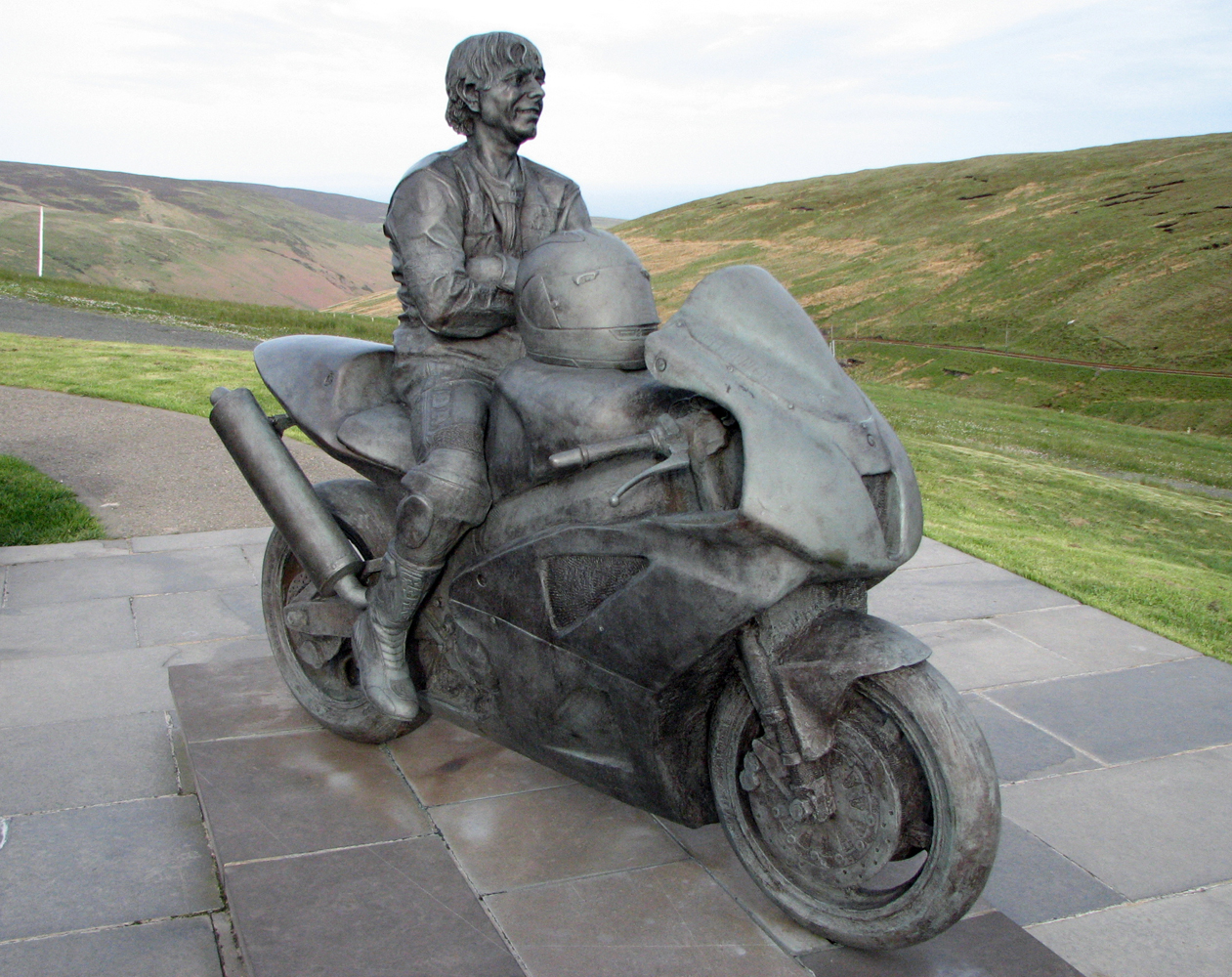
Statue on the TT course

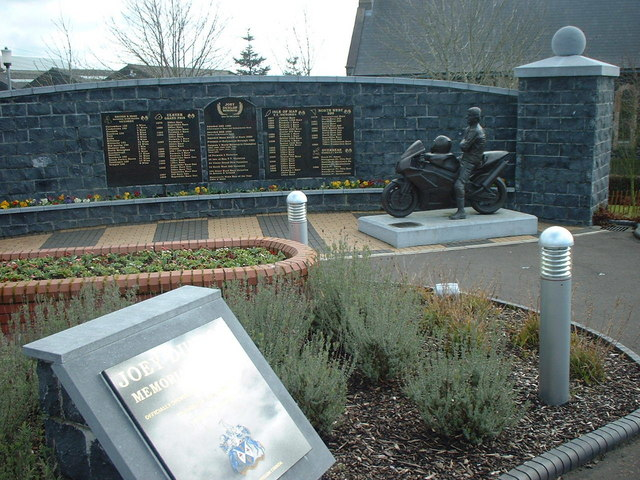
Memorial at the Joey and Robert Dunlop Memorial Gardens, Ballymoney, Northern Ireland

== Legacy ==
The most successful overall rider at the annual TT races is awarded the "Joey Dunlop Cup". A memorial statue was erected in his home town of Ballymoney. On the Isle of Man, a statue of Dunlop astride a Honda overlooks the Bungalow Bend at Snaefell and the 26th Milestone area of the TT course was named "Joey's". A memorial stone was installed at the crash site in Tallinn as well. Irish publishers The O'Brien Press produced a full-colour pictorial tribute to Dunlop following his death. Northern Ireland band Therapy? recorded a song in memory of Dunlop, called "Joey"; it appeared on the album Shameless, released in 2001.

Following his death, the Riada Leisure Centre in his hometown of Ballymoney was renamed the Joey Dunlop Leisure Centre.

In 2001, the Joey Dunlop Memorial Garden was established in the Dunlop family's hometown and in 2010 the tribute was extended to include the Robert Dunlop Memorial Garden to honour Joey's late brother, Robert Dunlop. On 26 February 2022, a statue of William Dunlop, son of Robert and nephew of Joey, was added to the Memorial Garden. William died while racing at the Skerries 100 event in 2018.

To commemorate the 25th anniversary of Dunlop's passing, a special event titled "Joey 25" took place on 24 May 2025 in his home town. The celebration honoured his enduring legacy in motorcycle racing. The event featured a parade of over 25 of his iconic motorcycles, ridden by successful racers, including World Superbike champions Carl Fogarty and Jonathan Rea, alongside Grand Prix stars Ron Haslam and Jeremy McWilliams. Festivities included a 'Meet the Riders' session, autograph signings, live music and a special memorabilia exhibition at Ballymoney Museum showcasing artefacts from his career.

On 2 July 2025, a tribute lap of the Isle of Man TT course was held to mark the 25th anniversary of Dunlop’s death. Organised by the Joey Dunlop Foundation, the event invited riders to gather at the TT Grandstand in Douglas for a commemorative ride around the Mountain Course.

Also in July 2025, Arai released a limited-edition RX-7V Evo helmet to commemorate the 25th anniversary of Dunlop’s death. Styled after his iconic yellow and black racing design, only 600 individually numbered units were produced. Each helmet included a 25th anniversary badge, a Shell Oil sticker pack, and a certificate signed by Dunlop’s widow, Linda. A royalty from each sale went to her, and a donation was pledged toward a new monument at the Memorial Garden in Ballymoney.

In August 2025, a pop-up exhibition titled Joey Dunlop 2000 was held at the Mercury Club during the Classic TT, commemorating Dunlop’s final hat-trick of Isle of Man TT victories and featuring memorabilia including his race leathers, trophies, yellow helmet, and the motorcycles he rode to victory in 2000.

== Racing record ==
=== Complete TT record ===
2000	Ultra Lightweight; 1	Lightweight 250 TT; 1	Junior 600cc 4	Formula One TT; 1	Senior; 3	
1999	Ultra Lightweight; 27	Lightweight 250 TT; 5	Junior 600cc 5	Formula One TT; 2	Senior; 5	
1998	Ultra Lightweight TT; 9	Lightweight TT; 1	Senior TT; DNF			
1997	Ultra Lightweight; 10	Lightweight TT; 1	Junior TT; 5	Formula One TT; 6	Senior TT; 7	
1996	Ultra Lightweight; 1	Lightweight TT; 1	Formula One TT; 7	Senior TT; 2		
1995	Ultra Lightweight; DNF	Lightweight TT; 1	Junior TT; 4	Formula One TT; 2	Senior TT; 1	
1994	Ultra Lightweight; 1	Classic Junior; 2	Junior TT; 1	Supersport 600; 7	Formula One TT; 3	Senior TT; 3
1993	Ultra Lightweight; 1	Classic Lightweight; DNF	Junior TT; 3	Supersport 60; DNF	Formula One TT; 14	Senior TT; 11
1992	Ultra Lightweight; 1	Junior TT; DNF	Supersport 600; 9	Formula One TT; 3	Senior TT; DNF	
1991	Ultra Lightweight; 2	Junior TT; 5	Supersport 600; 6	Formula One TT; DNF	Senior TT; 2	
1990	Ultra Lightweight TT; DNF	Junior TT; DNF	Formula One TT; 8	Senior TT; 16		
1988	Production Class B 5	Production Class C 11	Junior TT; 1	Formula One TT; 1	Senior TT; 1	
1987	Production Class B 18	Junior 250cc TT; 8	Formula One TT; 1	Senior TT; 1		
1986	Production Class C 4	Junior TT; DNF	Formula One TT; 1	Senior TT; 4		
1985	Production 251–750cc 22	Junior TT; 1	Formula One TT; 1	Senior TT; 1		
1984	Production 251–750cc DNF	Junior TT; DNF	Classic TT; 2	Formula One TT; 1	Senior TT; DNF	
1983	Senior Classic TT; 3	Formula One TT; 1				
1982	Classic TT; DNF	Formula One TT; 2				
1981	Classic TT; DNF	Formula One TT; 3				
1980	Junior TT; 12	Classic TT; 1	Senior TT; 9			
1979	Junior 250cc TT; DNF	Classic TT; 6	Formula Two TT; 13	Formula One TT; DNF	Senior TT; DNF	
1978	Junior TT; 11	Classic TT; DNF	Formula Two TT; 5	Formula One TT; DNF	Senior TT; DNF	
1977	Junior 250cc TT; 10	Jubilee TT; 1	Classic TT; 7	Senior TT; 4		
1976	Lightweight 250cc TT; DNF	Junior TT; 16	Classic TT; DNF	Senior TT; 18		

=== Ulster Grand Prix: 24 victories ===
Year	Class/Race	Machine	Average
1979	500cc	Suzuki	112.76 mph
1979	Superbike 750cc	Yamaha	115.34 mph
1980	250cc	Yamaha	107.71 mph
1980	Superbike 1000cc	Suzuki	116.39 mph
1983	TT F1 920cc	Honda	107.38 mph
1984	250cc	Honda	110.55 mph
1984	500cc	Honda	118.17 mph
1984	TT F1	Honda	114.28 mph
1985	250cc	Honda	111.96 mph
1985	500cc	Honda	116.14 mph
1985	TT F1 750cc	Honda	114.45 mph
1986	Classic Race 500cc	Honda	118.29 mph
1988	250cc	Honda	112.30 mph
1990	TT F1 750cc	Honda	120.87 mph
1991	Superbike Race1 750cc	Honda	118.36 mph
1991	Superbike Race2 750cc	Honda	110.87 mph
1992	125cc	Honda	102.18 mph
1994	125cc	Honda	108.83 mph
1994	Superbike Race1 750cc	Honda	123.23 mph
1995	250cc Race1	Honda	117.94 mph
1995	250cc Race2	Honda	118.28 mph
1995	Superbike Race1 750cc	Honda	122.25 mph
1997	250cc Race2	Honda	.
1999	Superbike Race2 750cc	Honda	

=== North West 200: 13 victories ===
Year	Class/Race	Machine	Average
1979	International Match Race 750cc	Yamaha	120.01 mph
1979	NW200 Race 750cc	Yamaha	120.34 mph
1981	NW200 Race 1100cc	Honda	119.83 mph
1983	500 Race	Honda	106.05 mph
1983	NW200 Race 1000cc	Honda	105.64 mph
1984	MCN Master Race 750cc	Honda	107.02 mph
1985	250 Race 1	Honda	110.95 mph
1985	NW200 Race 750cc	Honda	118.68 mph
1986	NW200 Race 750cc	Honda	108.05 mph
1987	Superbike Race 750cc	Honda	113.29 mph
1987	NW200 Race 750cc	Honda	118.61 mph
1987	Production Race 750cc	Honda	108.77 mph
1988	Production Race 750cc	Honda	109.08 mph

=== Formula TT World Championship ===
Year	Result/Position
1980	3rd
1981	3rd
1982	1st
1983	1st
1984	1st
1985	1st
1986	1st
1987	2nd
1988	2nd
1990	2nd

=== World Grand Prix Championships ===
Year	Class	Race	Position	Points
1979	350cc	French Grand Prix (Le Mans)	9th	2
1985	250cc	British Grand Prix (Silverstone)	10th	1

=== World Formula 750 Championship ===
Year	Race	Position	Points
1979	Germany (Hockenheim)	9th	2

=== Macau Grand Prix ===
Year	Race	Position
1982	Macau	3rd
1983	Macau	2nd

=== Imola 200 ===
Year	Race	Position
1987	Italy (Imola)	3rd

=== World Superbikes (WSBK) 1988 ===
Race	Result
British (Donington)	3rd race 1, 5th race 2
Hungary (Hungaroring)	6th race 1
Germany (Hockenheim)	7th race 1, 5th race 2

(Dunlop had 30 points accumulated and was lying 3rd in the championship up until the TT races, however he stopped competing in the championship and still managed to finish 13th in the final championship table.)

== See also ==
- Robert Dunlop, Joey Dunlop's younger brother who died after a practice crash at the 2008 North West 200.
- William Dunlop, Joey Dunlop's nephew and Robert's son. Michael's brother. Died after a practice crash at the 2018 Skerries 100.
- Michael Dunlop, Joey Dunlop's nephew and Robert's son. William's brother.
- List of people on the postage stamps of Ireland
- Road (2014 film)

== Bibliography ==
- McDiarmid, Mac (1 January 2015). Joey Dunlop: His Authorised Biography. Evro Publishing. ISBN 978-1910505007.
- Barker, Stuart (14 October 2021). Joey Dunlop: The Definitive Biography of the Greatest Road Racer. John Blake Publishing. ISBN 978-1789465051.

Sporting positions
Preceded by Graeme Crosby	TT Formula One World Champion; 1982–1986	Succeeded by Virginio Ferrari
