= Jim Moodie (motorcyclist) =

British motorcycle racer

Jim Moodie born 15 February 1966 in Dumfries is a former British Superbike, Supersport and Isle of Man TT racer who retired in 2003 from the TT races after being involved in the accident that claimed the life of David Jefferies. He also raced successfully in British Superbikes, finishing second on two occasions and winning the Supersport championship twice, the first time with his own private bike, the second time on the V&M prepared Yamaha after competing on a factory Honda for the first part of the season, to then part ways with Honda after the TT.

Moodie's first TT win was in 1993 when he was successful in winning both the 600 and 400 Supersport classes, his final win was in 2002 when he won the Junior TT giving him a total of eight TT wins. In the 1998 Production TT, Moodie riding a Honda, posted the first ever lap of over 120 mph by a rider on a standard road going production motorcycle. In 1999, riding the by-then ageing 750 cc Honda RC45 against the newer, more powerful 1000 cc Yamahas ridden by David Jefferies and Ian Duffus, Moodie broke the outright TT lap record, then held by Carl Fogarty, from a standing start, a feat not achieved since the late 1960s by world champion John Surtees. However, tyre issues forced Moodie out of the race while in the lead. Moodie was the last rider to break the outright record on a 750 cc machine.

Apart from his racing career, Moodie was noted for his work in developing and setting up race motorcycles. He was involved in the development of the Duckhams Racing twin-shock rotary Norton, which Moodie took to second place in 1993 British Superbike Championship, then to championship victory by Scottish rider Ian Simpson the following year. Moodie was also instrumental in developing the ValMoto Racing Triumph 600 Supersport machine that won the 2003 Isle of Man Supersport TT, ridden by Bruce Anstey. Triumph also won the 2003 Supersport TT team award, with Anstey, Moodie, and John McGuinness all finishing in the top-ten ahead of Japanese manufacturer teams, a feat many pundits thought unlikely in its first production year.

After retirement, Moodie worked as a dealer of motorhomes and as a motocross rider coach with a base in Scotland, instructing riders such as John McGuinness, Ian Hutchinson, Glen Richards, Stuart Easton and Alex Lowes.
