= Rob Fisher (motorcyclist) =

Retired motorcycle road racer

- Nationality: English
Motorcycle racing career statistics
Isle of Man TT career
TTs contested	9 (1993-2000, 2002)
TT wins	10
First TT win	1994 Sidecar TT, Race A
Last TT win	2002 Sidecar TT, Race B
TT podiums	13

Rob Fisher (fl. 1990s) is a retired motorcycle road racer who won ten sidecar races at the Isle of Man TT, second only to Dave Molyneux's 17 wins.

Fisher started his racing career riding sidecar motocross as a teenager at local events and then had a spell as a passenger at British Championship level. He disliked being a passenger and soon changed to driving, but this time on the road. He soon found success with two British Championships in 1991 and 1992, but with no sponsorship the team disbanded. He then got a ride on a Jacobs Yamaha FZR600, backed by Eddy's Motorcycles and competed in one British Championship round at Donington Park before the TT, where he finished fifth in Sidecar Race A, along with passenger Vince Butler. In 1994, partnered by Mick Wynn he won two TT races. In 1995, he retained his crown and continued to win TTs over the next few years. Fisher's final trip to the Isle of Man in 2002 saw him take his tenth TT win.
