= Crookall =

Crookall is a Manx surname. Notable people with the surname include:

- Arthur Crookall (1873–1935), Manx politician and philanthropist
- Tim Crookall (fl. 2006), Manx politician

== See also ==
- A.B. Crookall Trophy
