= Airay =

Airay is a surname. Notable people with the surname include:

- Christopher Airay (1601–1670), English preacher and logician
- Henry Airay (c. 1560–1616), English priest and theologian
