= Frank Wootton =

Frank Wootton may refer to:

- Frank Wootton (artist) (1911–1998), British war artist famous for his work with the Royal Air Force
- Frank Wootton (jockey) (1893–1940), Australian, multiple British flat racing Champion Jockey
