= 2009 Manx Grand Prix =

Race details
Date	22 August – 4 Sep 2009
Location	Douglas, Isle of Man
Course	Road Course; 37.733 mi (60.725 km)

The 2009 Manx Grand Prix was held between Saturday 22 August and Friday 4 September 2009 on the 37.733-mile Mountain Course.

The Blue Riband event of race week was won by Michael Russell claiming victory in the Senior. The Ultra-Lightweight race proved to be an historic event with Carolynn Sells becoming the first female solo winner on the Snaefell Mountain Course. A hat-trick of successive race wins was completed by Ryan Farquhar winning the Senior Classic race. The Junior Manx Grand Prix was won by Stephen McIlvenna and Sean Murphy the Newcomers Race with Adrian Kershaw winning Class B. The combined Junior Classic Race was won by Chris McGahan and Ewan Hamilton winning the 250 cc Class. There was further race win for Ryan Farquhar in the new Post Classic Race Class with Brian Mateer first in Class (ii). There was a second successive win for Dan Sayle in the Lightweight Manx Grand Prix and second race win on the Mountain Course in 2009 after winning Sidecar TT Race 'A'. Musician Jake Drake-Brockman, a former member with the Liverpool group Echo & the Bunnymen, was involved in a fatal road traffic accident near Orrisdale North when the vintage BSA motorcycle he was riding was in collision with a converted ambulance.

== Results ==
=== Practice Times ===
==== 2009 Senior Manx Grand Prix Practice Times and Leaderboard ====
- Plates; Black race digits on Yellow race plates.

Rank	Rider	Mon 24 Aug	Tues 25 Aug	Wed 26 Aug	Thurs 27 Aug	Fri 28 Aug	Sat 29 Aug
1	(England) Scott Wilson; 750 cc Suzuki	20' 02.95; 112.912 mph	19' 14.83; 117.618 mph	Untimed; Practice	Cancelled; No Time	—— No Time	—— No Time
2	(Republic of Ireland) Ryan McCay; 750 cc Suzuki	—— No Time	19' 14.85; 117.615 mph	Untimed; Practice	Cancelled; No Time	—— No Time	—— No Time
3	(Isle of Man) Ryan Kneen; 600 cc Honda	19' 34.72; 115.626 mph	19' 17.33; 117.363 mph	Untimed; Practice	Cancelled; No Time	23' 34.94; 95.995 mph	23' 21.05; 96.947 mph
4	(Isle of Man) Simon Fulton; 750 cc Suzuki	—— No Time	19' 20.65; 117.028 mph	Untimed; Practice	Cancelled; No Time	25' 35.53; 88.457 mph	—— No Time
5	(Isle of Man) Sean Murphy; 600 cc Honda	19' 46.35; 114.492 mph	19' 26.54; 116.436 mph	Untimed; Practice	Cancelled; No Time	23' 54.54; 94.684 mph	—— No Time
6	(Republic of Ireland) Wayne Kirwan; 600 cc Yamaha	19' 48.74; 114.262 mph	19' 30.75; 116.022 mph	Untimed; Practice	Cancelled; No Time	—— No Time	—— No Time
7	(Republic of Ireland) Michael Sweeney; 600 cc Yamaha	20' 06.43; 112.587 mph	19' 32.64; 115.831 mph	Untimed; Practice	Cancelled; No Time	—— No Time	—— No Time
8	(Northern Ireland) Noel Patterson; 750 cc Suzuki	19' 34.72; 115.626 mph	19' 38.52; 115.253 mph	Untimed; Practice	Cancelled; No Time	25' 34.72; 88.430 mph	—— No Time
9	(England) Alan Jackson; 750 cc Suzuki	—— No Time	19' 35.09; 115.590 mph	Untimed; Practice	Cancelled; No Time	—— No Time	—— No Time
10	(Northern Ireland) Stephen Mcllvenna; 600 cc Yamaha	19' 38.46; 115.259 mph	19' 38.67; 115.239 mph	Untimed; Practice	Cancelled; No Time	21' 26.22; 105.602 mph	20' 53.78; 108.335 mph
11	(England) Andrew Brady; 748 cc Suzuki	—— No Time	19' 39.24; 115.183 mph	Untimed; Practice	Cancelled; No Time	—— No Time	—— No Time
12	(England) Phil McGurk; 600 cc Honda	19' 50.63; 114.080 mph	19' 42.82; 114.834 mph	Untimed; Practice	Cancelled; No Time	—— No Time	—— No Time
13	(England) Jules Croft; 600 cc Yamaha	20' 13.49; 111.932 mph	19' 43.37; 114.781 mph	Untimed; Practice	Cancelled; No Time	24' 00.26; 94.308 mph	—— No Time
14	(England) Peter Symes; 750 cc Suzuki	—— No Time	19' 45.19; 114.604 mph	Untimed; Practice	Cancelled; No Time	—— No Time	—— No Time
15	(Isle of Man) Glyn Jones; 750 cc Suzuki	19' 45.92; 114.534 mph	—— No Time	Untimed; Practice	Cancelled; No Time	23' 40.98; 95.587 mph	22' 57.46; 98.607 mph
16	(Republic of Ireland) David Lumsden; 600 cc Yamaha	20' 06.75; 112.557 mph	19' 46.26; 114.501 mph	Untimed; Practice	Cancelled; No Time	—— No Time	—— No Time
17	(England) Mike Minns; 600 cc Honda	19' 56.58; 113.514 mph	20' 00.34; 113.158 mph	Untimed; Practice	Cancelled; No Time	—— No Time	—— No Time
18	(France) Simon Perkin; 675 cc Triumph	20' 24.64; 110.912 mph	20' 01.70; 113.030 mph	Untimed; Practice	Cancelled; No Time	—— No Time	—— No Time
19	(Isle of Man) Andy Cowin; 600 cc Kawasaki	20' 32.80; 110.179 mph	20' 01.83; 113.018 mph	Untimed; Practice	Cancelled; No Time	—— No Time	—— No Time
20	(England) Ivan Lintin; 600 cc Suzuki	20' 01.90; 113.012 mph	20' 07.85; 112.454 mph	Untimed; Practice	Cancelled; No Time	23' 00.60; 98.383 mph	—— No Time

==== 2009 Junior Manx Grand Prix Practice Times and Leaderboard ====
- Plates; Black race digits on Blue race plates.

Rank	Rider	Mon 24 Aug	Tues 25 Aug	Wed 27 Aug	Thurs 28 Aug	Fri 29 Aug	Sat 30 Aug
1	(Isle of Man) Ryan Kneen; 600 cc Honda	19' 34.72; 115.626 mph	19' 17.33; 117.363 mph	Untimed; Practice	Cancelled; No Time	23' 34.94; 95.995 mph	23' 21.05; 96.947 mph
2	(Isle of Man) Sean Murphy; 600 cc Honda	19' 46.35; 114.492 mph	19' 26.54; 116.436 mph	Untimed; Practice	Cancelled; No Time	—— No Time	23' 25.70; 96.626 mph
3	(Republic of Ireland) Wayne Kirwan; 600 cc Yamaha	19' 48.74; 114.262 mph	19' 30.75; 116.022 mph	Untimed; Practice	Cancelled; No Time	—— No Time	—— No Time
4	(Republic of Ireland) Michael Sweeney; 600 cc Yamaha	20' 06.43; 112.587 mph	19' 32.64; 115.831 mph	Untimed; Practice	Cancelled; No Time	—— No Time	—— No Time
5	(Northern Ireland) Stephen Mcllvenna; 600 cc Yamaha	19' 38.46; 115.259 mph	19' 38.67; 115.239 mph	Untimed; Practice	Cancelled; No Time	21' 26.22; 105.602 mph	20' 53.78; 108.335 mph
6	(England) Phil McGurk; 600 cc Honda	19' 50.63; 114.080 mph	19' 42.82; 114.834 mph	Untimed; Practice	Cancelled; No Time	—— No Time	—— No Time
7	(England) Jules Croft; 600 cc Yamaha	20' 13.49; 111.932 mph	19' 43.37; 114.781 mph	Untimed; Practice	Cancelled; No Time	24' 00.26; 94.308 mph	—— No Time
8	(Republic of Ireland) David Lumsden; 600 cc Yamaha	20' 06.75; 112.557 mph	19' 46.26; 114.501 mph	Untimed; Practice	Cancelled; No Time	—— No Time	—— No Time
9	(Northern Ireland) Noel Patterson; 675 cc Triumph	—— No Time	19' 54.47; 113.714 mph	Untimed; Practice	Cancelled; No Time	—— No Time	—— No Time
10	(England) Mike Minns; 600 cc Honda	19' 56.58; 113.514 mph	20' 00.34; 113.158 mph	Untimed; Practice	Cancelled; No Time	—— No Time	—— No Time

==== 2009 Senior Classic Practice Times and Leaderboard ====
- Plates; White digits on Black race plates.
- Classic Machines 351 cc-500 cc

Rank	Rider	Mon 24 Aug	Tues 25 Aug	Wed 26 Aug	Thurs 27 Aug	Fri 28 Aug	Sat 29 Aug
1	(Northern Ireland) Ryan Farquhar; 500 cc Paton	20' 25.40; 110.844 mph	—— No Time	Untimed; Practice	Cancelled; No Time	—— No Time	—— No Time
2	(England) Oliver Linsdell; 500 cc Paton	21' 02.72; 107.568 mph	21' 17.31; 106.339 mph	Untimed; Practice	Cancelled; No Time	—— No Time	22' 12.11; 101.965 mph
3	(England) Alan Oversby; 497 cc MV Agusta	21' 12.83; 106.713 mph	—— No Time	Untimed; Practice	Cancelled; No Time	22' 16.31; 101.644 mph	—— No Time
4	(England) Roy Richardson; 476 cc Aermacchi	—— No Time	21' 34.26; 104.946 mph	Untimed; Practice	Cancelled; No Time	23' 15.22; 97.352 mph	—— No Time
5	(England) Mark Herbertson; 500 cc Matchless	22' 37.06; 100.090 mph	—— No Time	Untimed; Practice	Cancelled; No Time	—— No Time	—— No Time
6	(England) Mark Parrett; 500 cc Matchless	23' 43.52; 95.417 mph	22' 43.02; 99.653 mph	Untimed; Practice	Cancelled; No Time	25' 01.32; 90.472 mph	—— No Time
7	(Isle of Man) Alan Brew; 496 cc Seeley	—— No Time	22' 47.64; 99.315 mph	Untimed; Practice	Cancelled; No Time	—— No Time	—— No Time
8	(England) Paul Coward; 498 cc Weslake	23' 01.67; 98.307 mph	22' 52.82; 98.941 mph	Untimed; Practice	Cancelled; No Time	—— No Time	23' 39.05; 95.717 mph
9	(Scotland) Wattie Brown; 498 cc Norton	22' 54.17; 98.844 mph	23' 26.26; 96.588 mph	Untimed; Practice	Cancelled; No Time	23' 36.41; 88.406 mph	24' 07.03; 93.867 mph
10	(England) Andy Reynolds; 499 cc Paton	22' 56.40; 98.684 mph	23' 01.37; 98.328 mph	Untimed; Practice	Cancelled; No Time	—— No Time	25' 00.75; 90.507 mph

==== 2009 Junior Classic Practice Times and Leaderboard ====
- Plates; Black digits on White race plates.
- Class A Classic Machines 300 cc-350 cc

Rank	Rider	Mon 24 Aug	Tues 25 Aug	Wed 26 Aug	Thurs 27 Aug	Fri 28 Aug	Sat 29 Aug
1	(England) Roy Richardson; 348 cc Aermacchi	22' 39.67; 99.898 mph	—— No Time	Untimed; Practice	Cancelled; No Time	24' 12.98; 93.482 mph	—— No Time
2	(England) Chris McGahan; 346 cc Honda	—— No Time	22' 54.20; 98.842 mph	Untimed; Practice	Cancelled; No Time	—— No Time	—— No Time
3	(England) Bill Swallow; 349 cc AJS	23' 13.95; 97.441 mph	23' 18.32; 97.137 mph	Untimed; Practice	Cancelled; No Time	25' 01.75; 90.446 mph	24' 28.96; 92.465 mph
4	(England) Mark Parrett; 350 cc Honda	24' 17.26; 93.208 mph	23' 18.82; 97.102 mph	Untimed; Practice	Cancelled; No Time	—— No Time	—— No Time
5	(England) Paul Coward; 347 cc Honda	—— No Time	23' 30.27; 96.313 mph	Untimed; Practice	Cancelled; No Time	24' 50.49; 91.130 mph	26' 23.35; 85.785 mph
6	(Northern Ireland) Nigel Moore; 350 cc Honda	23' 54.08; 97.714 mph	—— No Time	Untimed; Practice	Cancelled; No Time	25' 01.89; 90.438 mph	—— No Time
7	(Isle of Man) David Madsen-Mygdal; 350 cc Honda	24' 11.99; 93.546 mph	—— No Time	Untimed; Practice	Cancelled; No Time	24' 55.85; 90.803 mph	24' 41.74; 91.668 mph
8	(England) Alec Whitewell; 350 cc Honda	24' 22.27; 92.889 mph	—— No Time	Untimed; Practice	Cancelled; No Time	—— No Time	—— No Time
9	(Isle of Man) Alan Brew; 349 cc Drixton	24' 30.99; 92.338 mph	24' 48.33; 91.262 mph	Untimed; Practice	Cancelled; No Time	26' 03.91; 86.852 mph	25' 07.52; 90.100 mph
10	(England) Mark Herbertson; 350 cc AJS	—— No Time	24' 33.57; 92.176 mph	Untimed; Practice	Cancelled; No Time	—— No Time	24' 49.53; 91.189 mph

==== 2009 Newcomers Race 'A' Practice Times and Leaderboard ====
- Plates; White digits on Red race plates
- Class A
- 550 cc-750 cc Four-stroke Four-cylinder motorcycles.
- 651 cc-1000 cc Four-stroke Twin-cylinder motorcycles.
- 601 cc-675 cc Four-stroke Three-cylinder motorcycles.

Rank	Rider	Mon 24 Aug	Tues 25 Aug	Wed 26 Aug	Thurs 27 Aug	Fri 28 Aug
1	(Isle of Man) Sean Murphy; 600 cc Honda	19' 46.35; 114.492 mph	19' 26.54; 116.436 mph	Untimed; Practice	Cancelled; No Time	23' 54.54; 94.684 mph
2	(Republic of Ireland) Leo Fitzgerald; 600c Yamaha	20' 33.97; 110.074 mph	20' 11.68; 112.099 mph	Untimed; Practice	Cancelled; No Time	23' 15.02; 97.366 mph
3	(Republic of Ireland) Benny Smith; 600 cc Yamaha	21' 15.68; 106.475 mph	20' 32.11; 110.241 mph	Untimed; Practice	Cancelled; No Time	—— No Time
4	(Republic of Ireland) Derek Sheils; 600c Yamaha	21' 12.02; 106.781 mph	20' 35.92; 109.901 mph	Untimed; Practice	Cancelled; No Time	—— No Time
5	(England) Grant Wagstaff; 599 cc Yamaha	23' 54.08; 97.714 mph	20' 46.74; 108.946 mph	Untimed; Practice	Cancelled; No Time	24' 53.63; 90.938 mph
6	(Northern Ireland) David Mulligan; 600c Yamaha	21' 15.68; 106.475 mph	20' 55.28; 108.206 mph	Untimed; Practice	Cancelled; No Time	24' 43.74; 91.544 mph
7	(Isle of Man) Paul Smyth; 600 cc Yamaha	21' 30.57; 105.246 mph	21' 05.38; 107.342 mph	Untimed; Practice	Cancelled; No Time	23' 22.25; 96.864 mph
8	(Scotland) Neil Brown; 600 cc Suzuki	23' 43.19; 99.640 mph	21' 44.34; 104.136 mph	Untimed; Practice	Cancelled; No Time	—— No Time
9	(Republic of Ireland) Ciaran O'Callaghan; 600 cc Yamaha	22' 46.93; 99.367 mph	21' 34.07; 104.962 mph	Untimed; Practice	Cancelled; No Time	26' 04.60; 86.814 mph
10	(Republic of Ireland) Michael Gillan; 600 cc Kawasaki	21' 36.78; 104.742 mph	21' 44.34; 104.136 mph	Untimed; Practice	Cancelled; No Time	29' 04.63; 77.855 mph

==== 2009 Newcomers Race 'B' Practice Times and Leaderboard ====
- Plates; White digits on Red race plates.
- Class B .
- 125 cc-Two-stroke Single-cylinder motorcycles.
- 251 cc-400 cc Four-stroke Four-cylinder motorcycles.
- Up to 650 cc Four-stroke Twin-cylinder motorcycles.

Rank	Rider	Mon 24 Aug	Tues 25 Aug	Wed 26 Aug	Thurs 27 Aug	Fri 28 Aug
1	(Scotland) Andy Lawson; 650 cc Suzuki	22' 24.56; 101.021 mph	21' 53.78; 103.387 mph	Untimed; Practice	Cancelled; No Time	23' 45.20; 95.305 mph
2	(Republic of Ireland) Andrew Farrell; 400 cc Kawasaki	22' 15.09; 101.737 mph	—— No Time	Untimed; Practice	Cancelled; No Time	—— No Time
3	(England) Adrian Kershaw; 400 cc Kawasaki	23' 24.51; 96.709 mph	22' 28.59; 100.719 mph	Untimed; Practice	Cancelled; No Time	23' 25.25; 96.658 mph
4	(Isle of Man) Dave Taylor; 400 cc Yamaha	22' 16.69; 101.615 mph	22' 29.52; 100.649 mph	Untimed; Practice	Cancelled; No Time	—— No Time
5	(England) Daniel Millard; 400 cc Kawasaki	22' 50.65; 99.098 mph	22' 51.97; 99.002 mph	Untimed; Practice	Cancelled; No Time	25' 52.42; 87.495 mph
6	(England) Ross Richard; 400 cc Honda	22' 58.05; 98.565 mph	—— No Time	Untimed; Practice	Cancelled; No Time	24' 15.20; 93.340 mph
7	(England) Michael Ellis; 400 cc Kawasaki	23' 14.27; 97.419 mph	23' 00.59; 98.384 mph	Untimed; Practice	Cancelled; No Time	24' 23.36; 92.820 mph
8	(England) Max Faulkner; 400 cc Kawasaki	24' 10.87; 93.618 mph	23' 01.03; 98.353 mph	Untimed; Practice	Cancelled; No Time	26' 16.10; 86.180 mph
9	(Northern Ireland) Gary Fowler; 650 cc Suzuki	23' 34.85; 96.002 mph	23' 02.72; 98.233 mph	Untimed; Practice	Cancelled; No Time	25' 10.07; 89.948 mph
10	(Northern Ireland) Darren Hughes; 650 cc Kawasaki	23' 53.07; 94.781 mph	23' 03.24; 98.195 mph	Untimed; Practice	Cancelled; No Time	25' 49.74; 87.646 mph

=== Race results ===
==== Race 1a; Newcomers Race A ====
Tuesday 1 September 2009 – Mountain Course 3 laps – 113.00 miles (181.96 km).

- 550 cc-750 cc Four-stroke Four-cylinder motorcycles.
- 651 cc-1000 cc Four-stroke Twin-cylinder motorcycles.
- 601 cc-675 cc Four-stroke Three-cylinder motorcycles.

Rank	Rider	Team	Speed	Time
1	(Isle of Man) Sean Murphy	600 cc Honda	108.870 mph	1:02.22.84
2	(Republic of Ireland) Derek Sheils	600 cc Yamaha	105.426 mph	1:04.25.10
3	(Northern Ireland) David Mulligan	600 cc Yamaha	102.578 mph	1:06.12.41
4	(England) Grant Wagstaff	599 cc Yamaha	102.510 mph	1:06.15.06
5	(Isle of Man) Paul Smyth	600 cc Yamaha	101.924 mph	1:06.37.93
6	(England) Michael Moulai	750 cc Suzuki	100.963 mph	1:07.15.95
7	(Republic of Ireland) Caoith Lawless	750 cc Suzuki	100.365 mph	1:07.40.03
8	(Republic of Ireland) Ciaran O'Callaghan	600 cc Yamaha	99.846 mph	1:08.01.12
9	(England) Jamie Adam	600 cc Suzuki	99.540 mph	1:08.13.68
10	(Republic of Ireland) Michael Gillan	600 cc Kawasaki	97.128 mph	1:09.55.35

Fastest Lap: Sean Murphy – 113.840 mph (19' 53.15) on lap 1.

==== Race 1a; Newcomers Race B ====
Tuesday 1 September 2009 – Mountain Course 3 laps – 113.00 miles (181.96 km).

- 125 cc-Two-stroke Single-cylinder motorcycles.
- 251 cc-400 cc Four-stroke Four-cylinder motorcycles.
- Up to 650 cc Four-stroke Twin-cylinder motorcycles.

Rank	Rider	Team	Speed	Time
1	(England) Adrian Kershaw	400 cc Kawasaki	98.363 mph	1:09.02.67
2	(Scotland) Andy Lawson	650 cc Suzuki	98.363 mph	1:09.59.07
3	(Republic of Ireland) Andrew Farrell	400 cc Kawasaki	96.900 mph	1:10.05.19
4	(England) Ross Richard	600 cc Suzuki	96.840 mph	1:10.07.79
5	(England) Daniel Millard	400 cc Kawasaki	94.657 mph	1:11.44.87
6	(Northern Ireland) Gary Fowler	650 cc Suzuki	93.452 mph	1:12.40.34
7	(England) Max Faulkner	400 cc Kawasaki	93.051 mph	1:12.59.15
8	(England) Paul Johnson	645 cc Suzuki	90.040 mph	1:15.25.61
9	(England) Adam Oliver	400 cc Kawasaki	88.199 mph	1:17.00.16
10	(Wales) Michael Jones	400 cc Yamaha	83.819 mph	1:21.01.49

Fastest Lap: Adrian Kershaw – 101.027 mph (22' 24.47) on lap 1.

==== Race 1b; Post Classic Race Class (i) ====
Tuesday 1 September 2009 – Mountain Course 3 laps – 113.00 miles (181.96 km).

- 550 cc-1000 cc Four-stroke Four-cylinder motorcycles with 2 valves.

Rank	Rider	Team	Speed	Time
1	(Northern Ireland) Ryan Farquhar	997 cc Suzuki XV69	104.452 mph	1:05.01.16
2	(England) Guy Martin	997 cc Suzuki XR69	99.139 mph	1:08.30.23
3	(Isle of Man) David Madsen-Mygdal	750 cc Triumph Trident	94.958 mph	1:11.31.19
4	(England) Simon Mara	997 cc Suzuki GS	88.257 mph	1:16.57.01
5	(England) Frank James	998 cc Kawasaki Z1	82.469 mph	1:22.21.09
6	(Isle of Man) Keith McKay	981 cc Laverda Jota	81.155 mph	1:23.41.09

Fastest Lap: Ryan Farquhar – 108.045 mph (20' 57.14) on lap 1.

==== Race 1b; Post Classic Race Class (ii) ====
Tuesday 1 September 2009 – Mountain Course 3 laps – 113.00 miles (181.96 km).

- 126 cc-250 cc Two-stroke Cylinder motorcycles with 2 valves.
- 251 cc-350 cc Two-stroke Cylinder motorcycles with 2 valves.
- 351 cc-500 cc Two-stroke Cylinder motorcycles with 2 valves.

Rank	Rider	Team	Speed	Time
1	(Northern Ireland) Brian Mateer	249 cc Yamaha	99.898 mph	1:07.59.01
2	(Scotland) Euan Hamilton	249 cc Yamaha	94.064 mph	1:12.11.98
3	(England) Paul Coward	375 cc Maxton	93.121 mph	1:12.55.86
4	(Isle of Man) Dean Martin	350ccc Yamaha	90.297 mph	1:15.12.70
5	(England) Tom Jackson	249 cc Yamaha	88.711 mph	1:16.33.38
6	(England) Tony Russell	249 cc Yamaha	88.421 mph	1:16.48.46
7	(Scotland) Derek Glass	249 cc Yamaha	87.416 mph	1:17.41.43
8	(England) Paul Welch	250 cc Yamaha	86.490 mph	1:18.31.34
9	(England) Kevin Main	250 cc Yamaha	79.092 mph	1:25.52.02

Fastest Lap: Brian Muir – 103.130 mph (21' 57.06) on lap 1.

==== Race 2; Junior Manx Grand Prix ====
Wednesday 2 September 2009 – Mountain Course 4 laps – 150.92 miles (242.80 km)

- 201 cc-250 cc Two-stroke motorcycles.
- 550 cc-600 cc Four-stroke four-cylinder motorcycles.
- 651 cc-750 cc Four-stroke twin-cylinder motorcycles .

Rank	Rider	Team	Speed	Time
1	(Northern Ireland) Stephen Mcllvenna	600 cc Yamaha	116.707 mph	1:17.35.33
2	(Isle of Man) Ryan Kneen	600 cc Honda	116.559 mph	1:17.41.27
3	(Republic of Ireland) David Lumsden	600 cc Yamaha	116.099 mph	1:17.59.72
4	(England) Michael Russell	600 cc Yamaha	116.059 mph	1:18.01.35
5	(Republic of Ireland) Ryan McCay	600 cc Suzuki	115.773 mph	1:18.12.92
6	(Republic of Ireland) Wayne Kirwan	600 cc Yamaha	115.522 mph	1:18.23.09
7	(Isle of Man) Sean Murphy	600 cc Honda	115.324 mph	1:18.31.20
8	(England) Alan Jackson	600 cc Honda	115.157 mph	1:18.37.99
9	(England) Scott Wilson	600 cc Yamaha	115.096 mph	1:18.40.52
10	(England) Kirk Farrow	600 cc Yamaha	115.017 mph	1:18.43.77

Fastest Lap; Ryan Kneen – 19 minutes 03.93 seconds 118.738 mph on lap 1

==== Race 3a; Senior Classic Race ====
Wednesday 2 September 2009 – Mountain Course 4 laps – 150.92 miles (242.80 km)

- For motorcycles exceeding 351 cc and not exceeding 500 cc

Rank	Rider	Team	Speed	Time
1	(Northern Ireland) Ryan Farquhar	499 cc Paton	108.018 mph	1:23.49.85
2	(Scotland) Wattie Brown	498 cc Norton	102.295 mph	1:28.31.21
3	(England) Andy Reynolds	499 cc Paton	97.403 mph	1:32.57.95
4	(England) Keith Dixon	496 cc Seeley	97.122 mph	1:33.14.10
5	(England) Henry Bell	498 cc Honda	95.044 mph	1:35.16.41
6	(England) Ken Davis	500 cc Honda	94.999 mph	1:35.19.14
7	(England) Richard Stott	496 cc Matchless	91.366 mph	1:39.06.56
8	(England) Derrick Holliland	499 cc Petty	90.551 mph	1:40.00.09
9	(England) Ian Bainbridge	499 cc Norton	90.441 mph	1:40.07.34
10	(England) Brian Cooper	496 cc Seeley	89.332 mph	1:41.21.93

Fastest Lap: Ryan Farquhar – 110.984 mph (20' 23.85) on lap 3

==== Race 3b; Junior Classic Race ====
Wednesday 2 September 2009 – Mountain Course 4 laps – 150.92 miles (242.80 km)

- Class A for motorcycles exceeding 300 cc and not exceeding 350 cc.

Rank	Rider	Team	Speed	Time
1	(England) Chris McGahan	346 cc Honda	98.518 mph	1:31.54.83
2	(Isle of Man) Paul Coward	347 cc Honda	96.509 mph	1:33.49.67
3	(Isle of Man) David Madsen-Mygdal	350 cc Honda	96.105 mph	1:34.13.32
4	(Northern Ireland) John Burrows	350 cc Honda	94.962 mph	1:35.25.36
5	(England) Doug Snow	340 cc Ducati	93.825 mph	1:36.30.71
6	(Wales) Meredydd Owen	348 cc Seeley	91.763 mph	1:38.40.41
7	(England) Mick Moreton	349 cc Seeley	91.058 mph	1:39.26.48
8	(Republic of Ireland) Sean Leonard	348 cc Seeley	90.442 mph	1:40.08.61
9	(Scotland) Gordon Yule	350 cc Honda	89.336 mph	1:41.21.65
10	(England) David Matravers	350 cc Honda	89.318 mph	1:41.21.89

Fastest Lap: Alan Oversby – 100.383 mph (22' 33.10) on lap 2

==== Race 4a; Lightweight Manx Grand Prix ====
Friday 4 September 2009 – Mountain Course 4 laps – 150.92 miles (242.80 km)

- Two-stroke motorcycles 201 cc – 350 cc

Rank	Rider	Team	Speed	Time
1	(Isle of Man) Dan Sayle	250 cc Honda	111.883 mph	1:20.56.07
2	(England) Neil Kent	250 cc Yamaha	111.878 mph	1:20.56.30
3	(Northern Ireland) Davy Morgan	250 cc Honda	110.430 mph	1:21.59.98
4	(Wales) Paul Owen	250 cc Honda	108.764 mph	1:23.15.34
5	(England) Phil Harvey	250 cc Honda	107.359 mph	1:24.20.71
6	(England) Tom Snow	250 cc Honda	104.103 mph	1:26.58.98
7	(England) Tom Snow	250 cc Honda	106.944 mph	1:03.30.24
8	(Isle of Man) Dean Martin	250 cc Honda	103.983 mph	1:27.05.01
9	(Isle of Man) Philip McGurk	250 cc Yamaha	103.849 mph	1:27.11.74
10	(England) Neil Cudworth	250 cc Yamaha	96.681 mph	1:33.39.65

- Neil Kent – 19 minutes 50.35 seconds 114.108 mph

==== Race 4b; Ultra-Lightweight Manx Grand Prix ====
Friday 4 September 2009 – Mountain Course 4 laps – 150.92 miles (242.80 km)

- Two-stroke motorcycles up to 125 cc, 6 gears maximum.
- Four-stroke motorcycles 251 cc – 401 cc
- Up to 650 cc Four-stroke twin-cylinder.

Rank	Rider	Team	Speed	Time
1	(Isle of Man) Carolynn Sells	400 cc Yamaha	106.022 mph	1:25.24.51
2	(England) Mike Minns	650 cc Suzuki	104.759 mph	1:26.26.31
3	(Republic of Ireland) Wayne Kirwan	650 cc Suzuki	104.736 mph	1:26.27.44
4	(England) Brian Purdy	399 cc Honda	104.509 mph	1:26.38.71
5	(England) Ivan Lintin	650c Suzuki	104.403 mph	1:26.43.98
6	(Isle of Man) Peter Simpson	400 cc Kawasaki	103.270 mph	1:27.41.08
7	(England) Andy Cowin	400 cc Yamaha	102.524 mph	1:28.19.35
8	(England) Tim Sayers	400 cc Kawasaki	102.249 mph	1:28.33.61
9	(England) Simon Perkin	650 cc Suzuki	102.142 mph	1:28.39.20
10	(England) Adrian Kershaw	400 cc Kawasaki	102.071 mph	1:28.42.87

- Fastest Lap Wayne Kirwan – 20 minutes 55.04 seconds 108.226 mph.

==== Race 5; Senior Manx Grand Prix ====
Friday 4 September 2009 – Mountain Course Mountain Course 4 laps – 150.92 miles (242.80 km)

- Four-stroke Four-cylinder motorcycles exceeding 550 cc and not exceeding 750 cc.
- Four-stroke Twin-cylinder motorcycles exceeding 651 cc and not exceeding 1000 cc.
- Four-stroke Three-cylinder motorcycles exceeding 601 cc and not exceeding 675 cc.

Rank	Rider	Team	Speed	Time
1	(England) Michael Russell	750 cc Suzuki	113.537 mph	1:19.45.34
2	(Isle of Man) Sean Murphy	600 cc Honda	112.018 mph	1:20.50.23
3	(Isle of Man) Ryan Kneen	600 cc Honda	111.903 mph	1:20.55.19
4	(England) Ivan Lintin	600 cc Suzuki	109.232 mph	1:22.53.92
5	(Isle of Man) Simon Fulton	750 cc Suzuki	108.711 mph	1:23.17.77
6	(Republic of Ireland) Phillip McGurk	600 cc Honda	107.700 mph	1:24.04.69
7	(England) James Shipley	599 cc Yamaha	107.579 mph	1:24.10.34
8	(Republic of Ireland) Benny Smith	750 cc Suzuki	105.937 mph	1:.25.28.64
9	(Isle of Man) Andy Cowin	600 cc Yamaha	105.784 mph	1:25.36.07
10	(England) Jules Croft	600 cc Yamaha	105.671 mph	1:25.41.52

Fastest Lap: Michael Russell – 116.110 mph (19' 29.82) on lap 2.
