= A.B. Crookall Trophy =

Motorcycle race prize

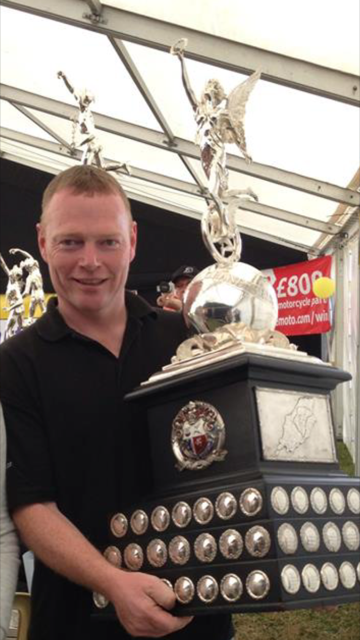
- Gary Carswell with the A.B. Crookall Trophy
- Awarded for: Winning the Senior Manx Grand Prix
- Presented by: Manx Motorcycle Club

History
- First award: Les Randles: 1923 Manx Amateur Road Races
- Most recent: Johnny Stewart: 2026 Senior Manx Grand Prix

The A.B. Crookall Trophy is awarded by the Manx Motorcycle Club to an individual for winning the Senior Manx Grand Prix. The trophy was donated by Arthur Binns Crookall, a former Mayor of the Borough of Douglas and Member of the House of Keys, and was first presented at the inaugural running of the races in 1923. The holder of the trophy for 2026 - 27 is Johnny Stewart.

== History ==
By the early 1920s, the Isle of Man TT Races had become established as the premier motorcycle races in the world. This led to questions regarding the future of the meeting, with concern for their continuance on the Isle of Man, as it was felt that the meeting could be transferred to England.

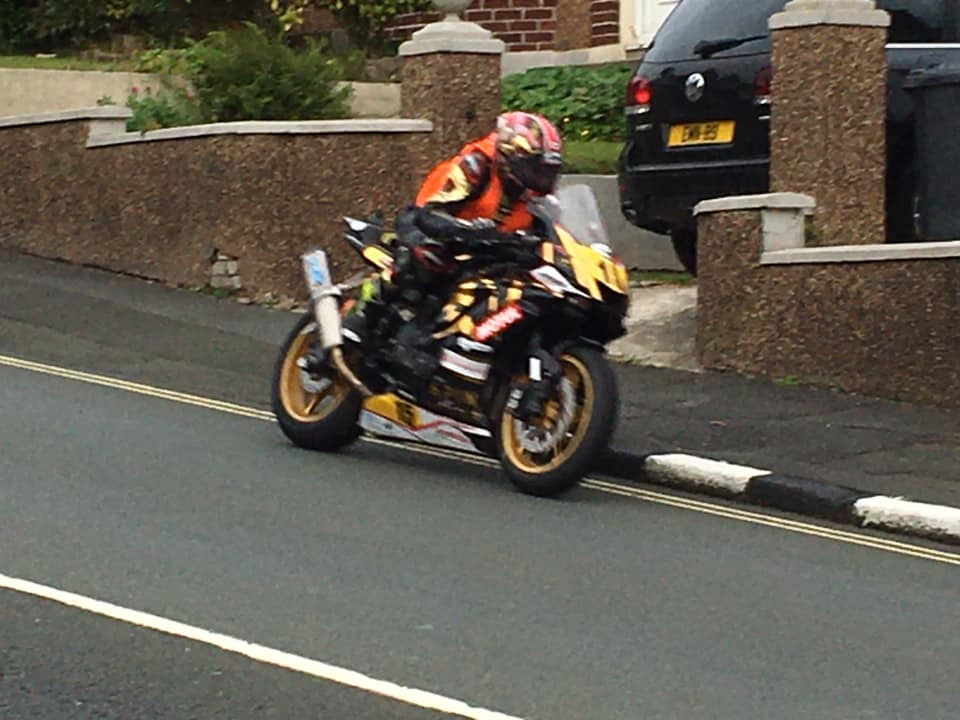
Joe Yeardsley descends Bray Hill on his way to victory in the 2023 Senior Manx Grand Prix.

Arthur Crookall was a strong supporter of the establishment of a supplementary race meeting on the Isle of Man to be held for amateur competitors, to be run over the existing Snaefell Mountain Course and to serve as a backup in the case of the Auto-Cycle Union making a decision to transfer the TT Races.

A successful businessman, Crookall decided to donate the trophy as first prize in what was initially called the Manx Amateur Road Races, and which continued as such until 1930 when it was renamed the Manx Grand Prix. The first person to win the trophy was Les Randles.

The A.B. Crookall Trophy is presented to the winner of the Senior Manx Grand Prix, the premier race of the meeting and which is run as the finale of the racing programme. Convention states that the trophy can only be won once, as the winner of the Senior Manx Grand Prix is then obliged to enter the TT Races.
