= Milford on Sea =

Village and parish in Hampshire, England

Coordinates: 50.726°N 1.589°W

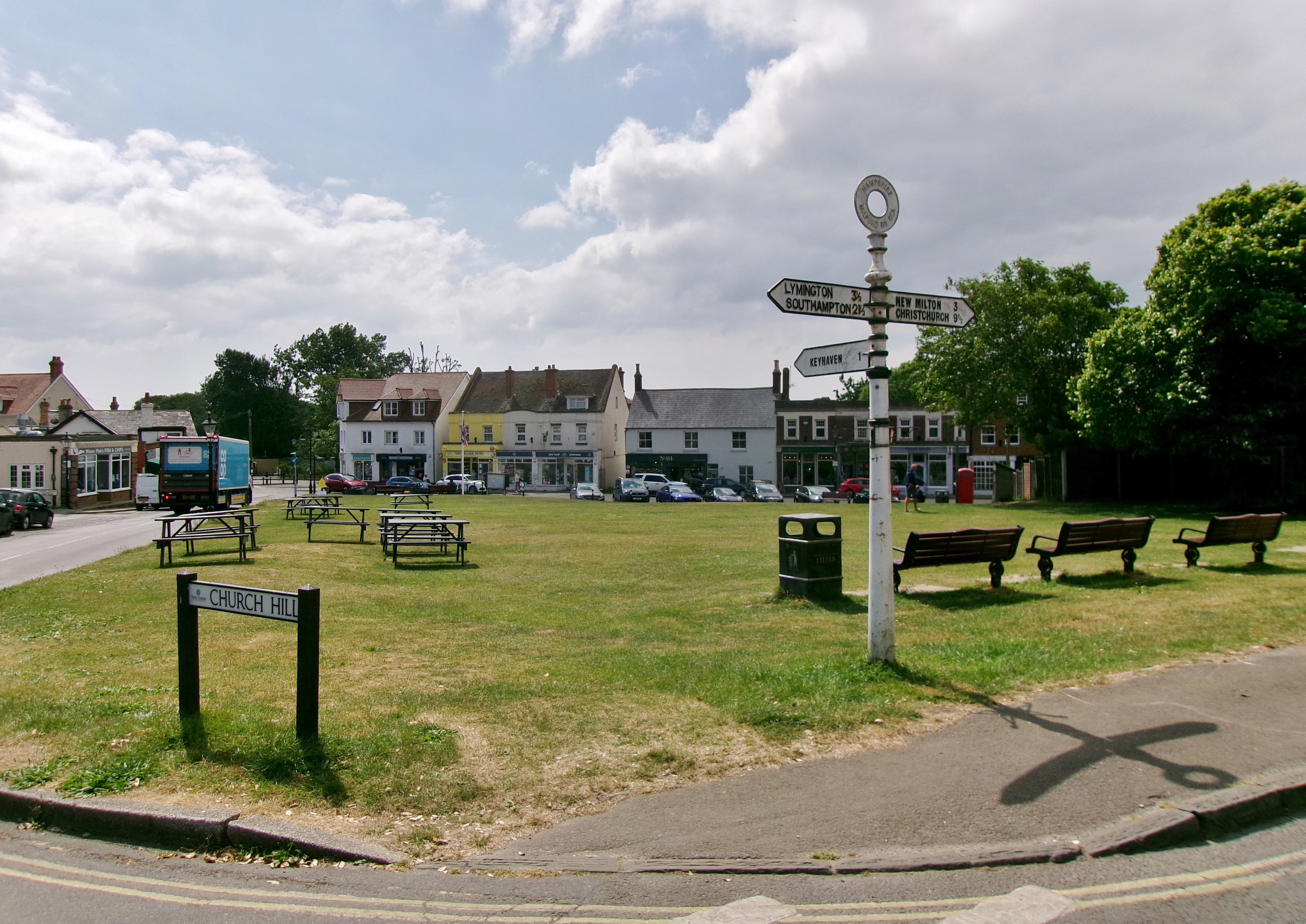
- Milford-on-Sea, village green

- Location within Hampshire
- Population: 4,660 (2011 Census including Downton)
- OS grid reference: SZ291919
- Civil parish: Milford-on-Sea
- District: New Forest
- Shire county: Hampshire
- Region: South East
- Country: England
- Sovereign state: United Kingdom
- Post town: LYMINGTON
- Postcode district: SO41
- Dialling code: 01590
- Police: Hampshire and Isle of Wight
- Fire: Hampshire and Isle of Wight
- Ambulance: South Central
- UK Parliament: New Forest West

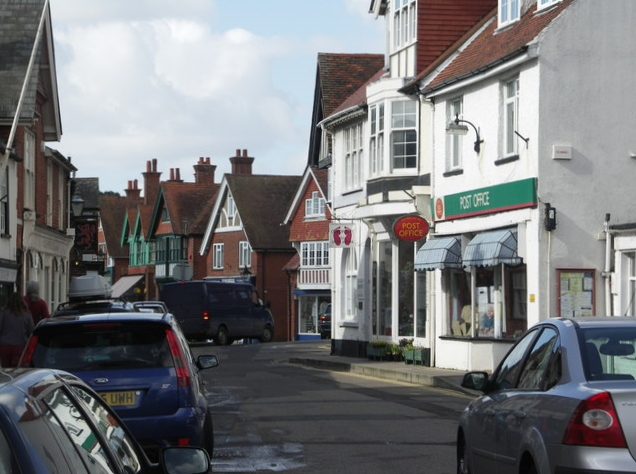
High Street

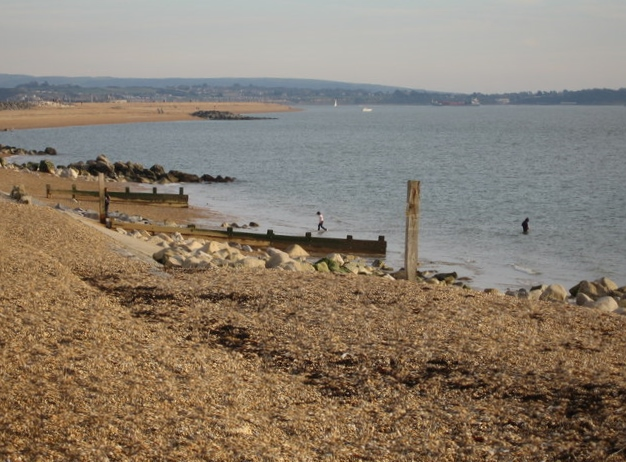
Shingle beach

Milford on Sea, often hyphenated, is a large coastal village and civil parish in the New Forest district, on the Hampshire coast, England. The parish had a population of 4,660 at the 2011 census and is centred about 3 miles (4.8 km) south of Lymington. The village has three small concrete piers on the beach.

Its western coast is a large bank of shingle below green cliffs. Bathing, when seas are calm, is favourable as tides are relatively muted for the coast at this point and thin sandbanks are nearby at lower water. The eastern part of the place culminates in Hurst Castle, Hurst Point which is a 16th-century defensive fort with later modifications, which has a museum, visitor tour rides and amenities for tourists.

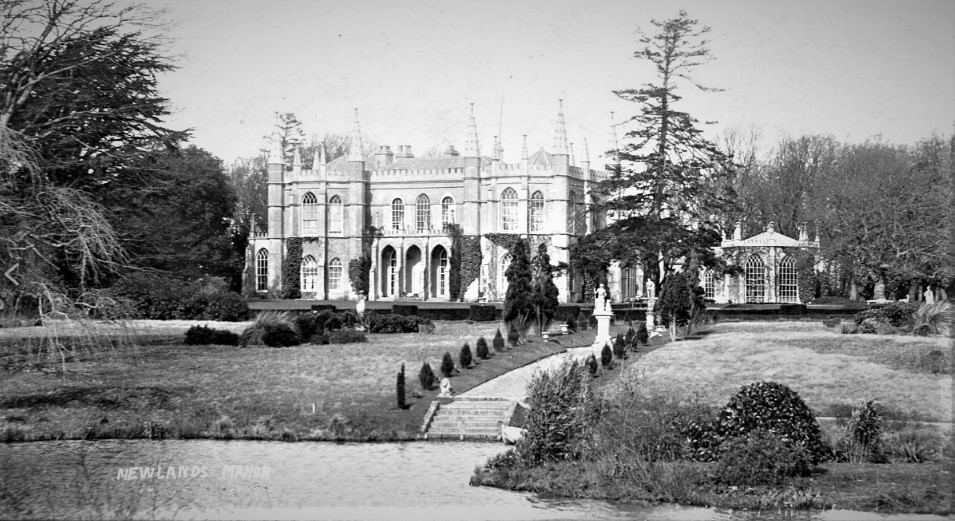
Newlands Manor, Hampshire, Milford on Sea, postcard before 1898 by Francis Frith

Much of the land of the parish has been recognised and protected from dense habitation by a surrounding green belt buffer zone of land, recognising its heath soil associated with the New Forest, its biodiverse wet woodland in the west (a local nature reserve which hosts badgers, fish and many bird species) and various water type marshes including an RSPB reserve in the east.

== History ==
Milford began as a Saxon settlement, and the name simply means "mill ford". At the time of the Domesday Book of 1086 there were two separate estates in Milford, one held by Aelfric Small, and the other land with no villeins or cottars noted held by Wulfgar. At a later date three separate manors were evolved from these estates and were eventually known by the names of Milford Montagu, Milford Barnes, and Milford Baddesley.

The manor of Milford Montagu, which was held of the lords of Christchurch, seems to have originated in an estate held by William Spileman at his death in 1291. In the late 14th century, it was part of the lands of William Montagu, 2nd Earl of Salisbury. In 1428 Thomas, the 4th Earl, died possessed of the manor, and was succeeded by his daughter Alice. By 1580 the manor had passed out of the hands of the Montagu family, and it was acquired in 1610 by Sir Thomas Gorges, who was succeeded by his son Sir Edward, Baron Gorges of Dundalk. In 1638 he sold it to Edward Hopgood. At the end of the 18th century, the manor was purchased by Admiral William Cornwallis.

The manor of Milford Barnes originally belonged to Christchurch Priory. After the Dissolution a twenty-one years' lease of "the site of the manor with the appurtenances and all land and fisheries belonging, together with 20 acres in Shorefield," was in 1557 granted to John Wavell, and in 1574 a similar lease was granted to John Rowe. Sir Thomas Gorges owned the estate in 1611, and from that time its descent was the same as that of the manor of Milford Montagu.

The manor of Milford Baddesley originated in an estate held in Milford by the Knights Templar. In the time of King John, Hugh de Whitwell and his son William granted land at Milford to William Mackerel which he granted to the Templars, for their preceptory of Baddesley. It was held of Christchurch manor. On the suppression of the order of Knights Templar this estate was granted, about 1312 to the Knights Hospitaller, to whom it continued to belong until the Dissolution of 1540. It was acquired by Robert Rickman around 1609, in whose family it remained into the 18th century. In 1829 Mary Anna Theresa Whitby, who had inherited Admiral Cornwallis' estates purchased Milford Baddesley, uniting all three estates.

=== Newlands ===
Around 1800 Admiral William Cornwallis leased then bought as freehold the small Newlands estate in Milford. This included the manors of Milford Montagu(e) and Milford Barnes. He was joined at Newlands by his friend and fellow naval officer Captain John Whitby and John's wife Mary Anna Theresa. John died in 1806, but Mary and her infant daughter Theresa stayed on looking after Cornwallis into his old age. On Cornwallis's death in 1819, Mary and her daughter inherited his fortune.

In 1829 Mary Whitby purchased Milford Baddesley, re-uniting the main manors of the parish covering about half of its area, thus about 2,500 acres (1,000 ha). Her daughter Theresa, who inherited these, married Frederick Richard West, and they used Newlands as one of their residences. Their son, born in 1835, bore the name of William Cornwallis-West. He inherited Newlands in 1886, and attempted to convert Milford into a premier seaside resort, changing the name of the village to Milford-on-Sea. His plans included the construction of a pier, railway station, public baths, health spa, and golf course. The scheme failed primarily due to a lack of funds and market interest, but it gave Milford a layout and ordered development that lasted well into the 20th century. The other surviving element of this plan is Westover Hall. It was built in 1897 originally as a private villa for Alexander Siemens. It was later converted to a hotel. William's son George Cornwallis-West inherited Newlands in 1917 and, amid bankruptcy proceedings, sold it three years later.

=== Modern times ===
As recently as 1800 the parish of Milford was entirely inland, being separated from the sea by a narrow strip of coast-line which was an extension eastwards of Hordle parish. Coastal erosion, as well as the growth of the village to the south and west, meant that by 1900 Milford bordered the sea. Milford was part of a combined Milford and Pennington Parish Council after 1894, and then became a separate Milford Parish Council when Pennington was separated from it in 1911. However, in 1932 Milford was absorbed into an enlarged Lymington Borough, only re-emerging as a separate parish on 1 April 1979.

With the advent of increasing car ownership, especially after the Second World War, the village expanded rapidly as a resort and as a place in which to retire. Blocks of flats were constructed along the clifftop in the 1960s and 1970s, and additional housing was built inland.

Tourism and businesses for retirees as well as the care sector make up large parts of Milford's economy. Businesses include restaurants, cafés, tea rooms, small shops, garden centres, pubs and camping/lodge/caravan parks, bed-and-breakfasts and a few luxury hotels. Shops cluster on its small high street, which fronts a village green.

== Geography ==
From most of the coast on a clear night, the conurbation of Christchurch, Bournemouth and Poole is visible from the coastal road and adjoining promenade and the brighter stars; in daytime the view extends in most weather conditions to the white cliffs and further part of the headland beyond of the Isle of Purbeck, a peninsula in Dorset. At the closer level Milford is on a broad sub-bay (Christchurch Bay), ended by the Bournemouth Bay headland and entrance to the harbour of Christchurch, which thus juts out little from this vantage point, Hengistbury Head, traversed by a regular foot ferry in most seasons.

To the east in the parish, less than a mile from the nucleated village centre, is Keyhaven which has a boatyard and half of the Lymington-Keyhaven nature reserve (or Marshes): a raised sea wall path around migratory bird shallow lakes, cattle/rabbit meadow and diverse wetland including salt marsh. To its south Keyhaven Harbour is a natural lagoon extension of the biome, west of which Sturt Pond is its estuarine habitat extension.

South of the lagoons leading to the harbour and close to town centre Sturt Pond is Hurst Spit, 2 kilometres (1.2 mi) of almost all shingle, from the apex of which – Hurst Point – men stationed at Hurst Castle watched over and could bombard the Solent's western access. A seasonal ferry makes the trip across the lagoon/harbour mouth every 20–30 minutes. This saves the walk along the beach. The beach is mainly west, as cliffs of Milford rise, and is safe to walk so the accessible length of beach (including the southeast side of the spit) is 4.1 miles (6.6 km), to Barton-on-Sea Golf Course where the way, above and below cliff, become liable to closures from erosion.

The beach has varying size shingle, beyond which is some inter-tidal sand. Facing this and the broad clifftop/lower town residential promenade are the Needles and rest of the north-western Isle of Wight.

The western cliffs are accessed by flights of steps. In common with the flatter coast by the more commercial and eastern part of Milford, they have car parks with some facilities, which, along with many apartment blocks and houses, have close views of the Needles, which are the main, large chalk rocks immediately next to the Isle of Wight.

== All Saints' Church ==
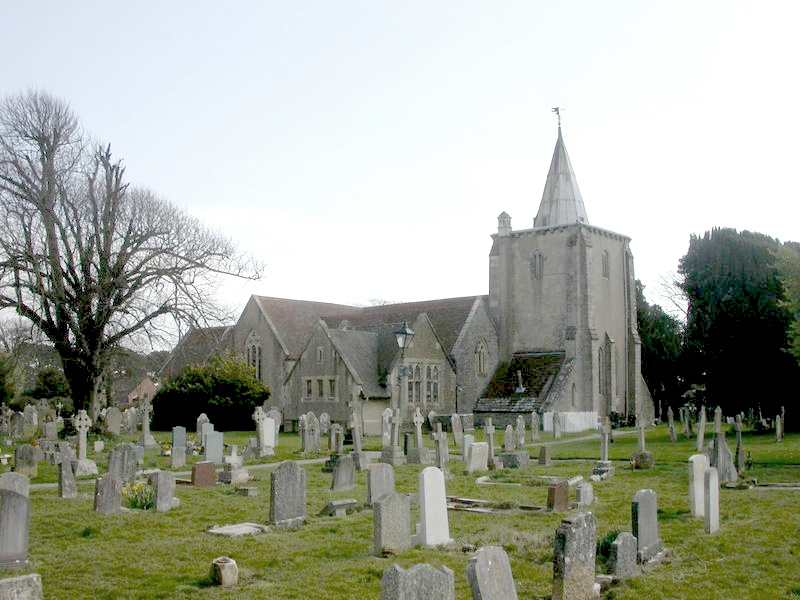
All Saints' Church, Milford

The oldest building in Milford is All Saints' Church. The earliest parts of the structure are probably true Norman-era (early 12th century) work from a preceding church. A south aisle was added around 1170. In the 13th century the church was more than trebled in size and brought to its present plan. This work, which occurred in stages, included the north façade and tower, the chancel, and north and south chapels. The work was funded by Isabel de Forz, 8th Countess of Devon. The tower has a later, short recessed spire. The north aisle was rebuilt in the mid-1850s and the church's current pulpit was added in around 1920. William Saville-Kent is buried here, his grave decorated with a variety of fossilised sponges.

The ecclesiastical parish still includes the chapelry or united benefice of Everton and the locality of Keyhaven where water dominates the land in the east.

== Governance ==
An electoral ward in the name of Milford exists. At the 2011 Census the population of this ward was 4,838. The district, for most hard communal infrastructure, education and social care (amongst other functions) is in Hampshire County Council's area.

== Events and festivals ==
- In February the place's Food Week takes place.
- Milford holds a May Day festival each year.
- In June–July there is a music (with many live bands across many venues) and arts festival.

== Parish Vision 2020 ==
This plan is a statement of community ambitions, based on research and public consultation. It builds on the 2002 Village Design Statement which dealt essentially with land use issues.

Strategic objectives:

- Improving housing and employment opportunities, particularly for young people
- Improving the provision of social, cultural and recreational facilities.
- Enhancing and protecting the natural environment.
- Maintaining and developing parish facilities for tourism and business opportunities.
- Improving transport links with hinterland communities.
- Making the village centre safer for pedestrians whilst protecting its special character.

== Notable residents ==
- Christopher Airay (1601–1670), logician, was vicar here in the 17th century, from about 1646.
- Clement Reid (1853–1916), geologist, proponent of Doggerland, died in the village.
- William Morris, 1st Viscount Nuffield (1877–1963), philanthropist and industrialist, owned a house on the clifftop, 1 Park Lane, which is now a hotel.
- Margaret Macadam (1902–1991), artist and illustrator, widow of Francis Beart, spent her last years in the village.
- Frank Wootton (1914–1998), 20th century aviation artist, was born in the village.
- David Peach (born 1951), Former Gillingham, Southampton, Swindon Town and Leyton Orient footballer.
- Frances Fisher (born 1952), Hollywood actress in films such as Titanic, was born here.
- George Bowyer (1859–1945), Trinity House habour pilot, lived here in his retirement.
