= Douglas Pirie =

Douglas Pirie may refer to:

- Douglas Alistair Gordon Pirie (1931–1991), English long-distance runner
- Douglas J. Pirie (1907–1935), English motorcyclist
