= 1923 Manx Amateur Road Races =

The 1923 Manx Amataeur Road Races a forerunner of the Manx Grand Prix were held on 20 September 1923. The first winner was Les Randles riding a 500c Sunbeam motor-cycle.

During an early morning practice session, the Isle of Man competitor Ned Brew crashed fatally in an accident at the Hillbery Corner.

== Results ==
=== 1923 Manx Amateur Road Race ===
Thursday 20 September 1923 – 5 laps (188.75 miles) Isle of Man TT Mountain Course.

Rank	Rider	Team	Speed	Time
1	(England) Les Randles	Sunbeam	52.77 mph	3:34.32.0
2	(England) Kenneth Twemlow	New Imperial	52.46 mph	3:35.49.0
3	(Isle of Man) Arthur J.Marsden	Douglas	51.74 mph	3:38.18.0
4	(England) W.H.Houghton	Sunbeam	51.01 mph	3:42.03.0
5	(England) C.Waterhouse	Sunbeam	50.69 mph	3:43.19.0
6	(England) J.W.Bezzant	Norton	47.67 mph	3:57.09.0
7	(England) Edwin Twemlow	350cc Sunbeam		
8	(England) H.V.Prescott	Scott		
9	(England) N.Owen	Norton		
10	(England) V.F.Crosthwaite	Beardmore Precision		
