= Margaret Macadam =

British illustrator

- Born: 14 July 1902; West Ham
- Died: 24 March 1991 (aged 88); Milford on Sea
- Education: Royal Academy Schools
- Occupation: illustrator
- Known for: Designed dust jacket for first edition of Agatha Christie's novel Giant's Bread
- Spouse: Francis Beart

Margaret Macadam (1902–1991) was a British illustrator who was active in the 1920s and 1930s. In 1923-24, she was a member of the Society of Women Artists, and in 1925, she was awarded a scholarship to the Royal Academy Schools where a fellow student was Amy Elton, who would later become her sister-in-law. Among her commercial works are several dust jacket designs for London-based publishers, with one of her most notable designs being the dust jacket for the first edition of Agatha Christie's first straight novel Giant's Bread, in 1930. In 2016, an archive of Macadam's work was discovered, allowing her work on "Giant's Bread" to be connected to other known designs. The original artwork for Giant's Bread was sold for £550 in 2016. She is also known to have designed wallpaper, and greetings cards for Medici, London. Other examples of her work include a painting titled 1933. In May 1936 she married Francis Beart, who was already well-known as a racing motor cyclist and motor cycle tuner. Beart later gained recognition for tuning Formula Three racing cars. During World War II she trained as a nurse in the Voluntary Aid Detachment (VAD) while her husband worked as an engineer for the Bristol Aeroplane Company. Her father, Charles Leslie Bernard Macadam, and her grandfather, Charles Thomas Macadam, both worked in the fertiliser industry, her great-uncle was John Macadam after whom Macadamia nuts are named, while her great-grandfather was William Macadam of Glasgow.

== Book dust jacket designs ==
Among her known works are:

- Giant's Bread by Mary Westmacott, a nom-de-plume of Agatha Christie (1930) William Collins, Sons - 'Collins', London - first edition.
- Water into Wine by Catherine Cotton (1930) Collins, London - dust jacket for overseas edition.
- This Siren Song by Ernest Elmore (1930) Collins, London - dust jacket for first edition.
- Living One's Life by Evelyn Pember (1932) Collins, London - dust jacket for first edition.
- Joseph Kerkhoven's Third Existence by Jacob Wassermann (1934) Allen & Unwin, London - dust jacket for first UK edition.
- Blind Mouths by Thomas Frederic Tweed (1934) Arthur Barker, London - dust jacket for first edition.
- Neighbours by George Thomas (1935) Williams & Norgate, Ltd., London - dust jacket for first edition.
- The Barbarians by Virginia Faulkner (1935) Arthur Barker, London - dust jacket for first edition.
- Humour by Stephen Leacock (1935) The Bodley Head, London - dust jacket for first edition.

Not all her dust jackets are signed, but those for Water into Wine, Joseph Kerkhoven's Third Existence, Blind Mouths, Neighbours, The Barbarians and Humour are.
