= Thomas F. Tweed =

British soldier and writer

Lieutenant-Colonel Thomas Frederic Tweed MC (1891 – 30 April 1940) was a British soldier and novelist.

He was commissioned into the Lancashire Fusiliers. He won the Military Cross in World War I and at the age of 26 was named the youngest lieutenant colonel in the British Army at the time. He became a political adviser to David Lloyd George from 1927 until Tweed's death from a stroke. Tweed was primarily famous for his novels, among which were Blind Mouths and Rinehard. The latter was turned into the successful 1933 film Gabriel Over the White House, directed by Gregory LaCava and starring Walter Huston.

In the novel Rinehard and the film Gabriel Over the White House, the character of Pendie Molloy, the President's secretary (played in the film by Karen Morley), is based on Frances Stevenson, Lloyd George's secretary and mistress, with whom Tweed also had an affair.

== Works ==
- Rinehard: A Melodrama of the Nineteen-Thirties (A. Barker, 1933)

US edition, Gabriel Over the White House: A Novel of the Presidency (Farrar & Rinehart, 1933)

- Blind Mouths (A. Barker, 1934); also known as Hungry Mouths

US ed., Destiny's Man (Farrar & Rinehart, 1935). Dust wrapper for first UK edition of Blind Mouths designed by Margaret Macadam.
