= Gabriel Over the White House =

1933 film

- Lobby card
- Directed by: Gregory La Cava
- Screenplay by: Carey Wilson; Bertram Bloch (additional dialogue)
- Based on: Gabriel over the White House: A Novel of the Presidency a 1933 novel by Thomas F. Tweed
- Produced by: Walter Wanger (uncredited); William Randolph Hearst (uncredited)
- Starring: Walter Huston; Karen Morley; Franchot Tone
- Cinematography: Bert Glennon
- Edited by: Basil Wrangell
- Music by: William Axt
- Production companies: Cosmopolitan Productions; Metro-Goldwyn-Mayer
- Distributed by: Loew's Inc.
- Release date: March 31, 1933
- Running time: 86 minutes
- Country: United States
- Language: English
- Budget: $232,400

Gabriel Over the White House is a 1933 American pre-Code political fantasy film starring Walter Huston as a genial but politically corrupt U.S. President who has a near-fatal automobile accident and comes under divine influence—specifically that of the archangel Gabriel. Eventually, he takes control of the government, solves the problems of the nation, from unemployment to racketeering, and arranges for worldwide peace, before the angel leaves him, and he dies.

The film received the financial backing and creative input of businessman William Randolph Hearst. It was directed by Gregory La Cava, produced by Walter Wanger, and written by Carey Wilson based upon the 1933 novel Rinehard: A Melodrama of the Nineteen-Thirties by Thomas F. Tweed; Tweed did not receive screen credit (the film's opening credits read "from the anonymous novel, Gabriel Over the White House"), but he is credited in the film's copyright information. The supporting cast features Karen Morley, Franchot Tone, Arthur Byron, Dickie Moore, C. Henry Gordon, David Landau, and Samuel S. Hinds.

== Plot ==
After his inauguration, U.S. President Judson "Judd" Hammond, an amiable party-line politician, tells his new secretary Harley "Beek" Beekman that two people may be admitted to his presence at any time: his young nephew Jimmy, and Pendola "Pendie" Molloy, Hammond's mistress, who is made Beek's assistant.

At a press conference, Hammond says he will not meet with John Bronson, the leader of a million unemployed men marching to Washington, as he considers Bronson an anarchist, and also says he considers unemployment and racketeering to be local issues, and therefore not his responsibility. When a passionate reporter asks how he will respond to the dire state of the country in the depths of the Great Depression, Hammond responds with platitudes and promises a return to prosperity. Later, he perfunctorily signs various documents, and plays with Jimmy instead of listening to Bronson speak on the radio.

Hammond crashes his car while driving recklessly, and the medical opinion is that "he's beyond any human help." A breeze ruffles the curtains, his bed is briefly flooded with light, and Hammond opens his eyes. Two weeks later, his long-time personal doctor, Dr. Eastman, confides in Beek and Pendie that Hammond, who they and the public have been told is still comatose, is perfectly well physically, but has changed, and now just reads and thinks silently. They are admitted to see him, and—calling them Miss Molloy and Mr. Beekman—he asks for information about Bronson, and for an immediate meeting of his Cabinet to be arranged, at which he fires the Secretary of State for pushing him to call out the Army against the unemployed marchers.

Gangster Nick Diamond tries to bribe and threaten Bronson to keep his followers in their local camps as a continued distraction to law enforcement, but Bronson refuses, so Diamond has him killed in a drive-by shooting. The marchers continue to Baltimore, and Hammond goes to their camp. He praises Bronson as a martyr, and promises to create an Army of Constructions to create jobs.

That night, Pendie is troubled when Hammond does not recognize his manuscript for a speech to Congress until after there is a strange breeze and light. Talking with Beek, she wonders if "God might have sent the Angel Gabriel to do for Judd Hammond what he did for Daniel?"—that is, to be a messenger.

When Hammond fires his Cabinet, there is discussion about impeaching him. He appears at the Capitol and forces Congress to adjourn until normal conditions are restored, declaring that, if he is a dictator, "it is a dictatorship based on Jefferson's definition of democracy: a government for the greatest good of the greatest number." In a radio broadcast, he proposes a temporary stop to foreclosures, a National Banking Law, aid for agricultural workers, and an attack on racketeering.

Once Prohibition ends, there are plans for the U.S. government to open liquor stores, but the first one is bombed, and then there is a drive-by machine gun attack on the White House, wounding Pendie. Hammond makes Beek head of the newly-formed Federal Police, and tasks him with going after Diamond, knowing he and Pendie have fallen in love, so he will work hard to get revenge. Diamond is captured after a shootout, and he and his associates are executed by firing squad after a court-martial presided over by Beek.

At a conference to discuss the debts owed by foreign powers for money loaned by the United States during World War I, Hammond threatens a massive expansion of the U.S. military to ensure global peace, unless other countries cut their arms spending, and use the savings to repay their debts. The world community agrees to his plan, and leaders gather to sign the so-called Washington Covenant. Just as Hammond finishes signing, he collapses. He is carried away, and Pendie, alone with him, notices the light on his face change, after which he revives and calls her Pendie. She says he is "one of the greatest men who ever lived", and holds his hand as the curtains stir once more, and he dies. Arm-in-arm with Pendie, Beek announces the news to the gathered dignitaries. Outside, the flag is lowered to half-staff.

== Cast ==
- Walter Huston as President Judson "Judd" Hammond
- Karen Morley as Pendola "Pendie" Molloy
- Franchot Tone as Hartley "Beek" Beekman, Secretary to the President
- Arthur Byron as Jasper Brooks, Secretary of State
- Dickie Moore as Jimmy Vetter, Hammond's nephew
- C. Henry Gordon as Nick Diamond, a prominent gangster
- David Landau as John Bronson, leader of the Army of the Unemployed
- Samuel S. Hinds as Dr. H.L. Eastman
- William Pawley as Borell
- Jean Parker as Alice Bronson, John's daughter
- Claire Du Brey as a nurse
- Henry Kolker as Langham, the Senate Majority Leader (uncredited)
- Walter Walker as Cummings, Secretary of War (uncredited)
- John Larkin as Sebastian, Hammond's valet (uncredited)
- Mischa Auer as Thieson, a reporter (uncredited)

== Production ==
Production began in February 1932. Gabriel over the White House was released on March 31, 1933, with a run time of 85 to 87 minutes. A review print screened by Daily Variety on December 31, 1932, ran for 102 minutes, indicating that as many as 17 minutes were cut.

Walter Huston had recently portrayed Lincoln in the 1930 biographical film Abraham Lincoln, which was adapted for the screen by Stephen Vincent Benét, author of the epic poem John Brown's Body, winner of a 1929 Pulitzer Prize. Huston's performance in the film was highly praised, in spite of the fact that the cosmetics used to make him look younger in the scenes of Lincoln's youth had a comical effect.

According to Turner Classic Movies, modern sources have uncovered the fact that Louis B. Mayer did not see the script before filming and, as a staunch Republican and supporter of Herbert Hoover, held the film back until after the inauguration of President Roosevelt on March 4.

In a 2013 article in The New Yorker, Richard Brody wrote that "The story is extraordinary—and so is the story of its production, as told in Matthew Bernstein's biography of its producer, Walter Wanger, who gave the project its impetus. Hammond is a wild man with a purpose—and the new U.S. President, Franklin D. Roosevelt, loved it. As Bernstein tells it, this was no surprise; the movie was conceived as a Rooseveltian vehicle from the start. Wanger bought the novel on which it was based—a British futuristic fantasy by Thomas W. Tweed—in January, 1933, two months before the inauguration... Wanger rushed the movie into production (Hearst himself wrote some of Hammond's most flamboyant flights of political rhetoric) and rushed it into production (they shot for two weeks in February) so that it could be released soon after the inauguration." (However, despite Bernstein's assertions in his biography of producer Wanger, the production timeline given here could not have happened, as the Variety review of a December 1932 pre-release screening of the film cited above proves.)

"Wanger was working under the aegis of the production company owned by William Randolph Hearst, an ardent Roosevelt supporter (and who had much to do with Roosevelt securing the Democratic nomination) whose films were distributed by M-G-M, the boss of which, Louis B. Mayer, was a rock-ribbed Republican. Though Mayer was appalled, he didn't block its release (on March 31). In a piquant detail, Bernstein reports, "When Wanger, a staunch Roosevelt supporter, approached [the producer Irving] Thalberg about his differences with Mayer over politics and production ideas, Thalberg had told Wanger, 'Don't pay any attention to him.'" ... Rather, Wanger faced an even higher authority—the censorious Hays Code office, which required some changes, even some reshoots that blunted some of the sharpest political satire."

"One of the reasons for the movie's impact is its direction, by Gregory La Cava, He's essentially a comic director. His joltingly mixed moods have a novelistic sensibility, with a fluid and astute visual vulnerability to match... In "Gabriel," Hammond comes off not as a stuffy and out-of-touch grandee such as Hoover, but as a free-swinging, superannuated vestige of the Jazz Age, a character from Fitzgerald in the era of Steinbeck. La Cava's direction of Huston is kaleidoscopically dazzling; together, they turn the abstractions of straw-figure advocacy into an emotionally intricate and ever-surprising character. Hammond's quasi-divine possession comes off as a sort of distanced madness, a fury that grips him not at all blindly; he calmly and unapologetically observes himself rising—or going deeper—into world-historical grandeur. In the presence of radio microphones and world leaders, Hammond delivers a wild speech (dictated by Hearst), that, in its utopian and histrionic extremes, foreshadows the climactic oration by Charlie Chaplin in The Great Dictator even as the specifics of the principled power-grab at the core of the film seem downright fascistic."

Although an internal MGM synopsis had labeled the script "wildly reactionary and radical to the nth degree," studio boss Louis B. Mayer "learned only when he attended the Glendale, California preview that Hammond gradually turns America into a dictatorship" writes film historian Barbara Hall. Bernstein contradicts this statement saying that Mayer was kept posted all along, particularly through communications from the censor. According to Bernstein's biography of Wanger, however, "Mayer was furious, telling his lieutenant, 'Put that picture back in its can, take it back to the studio, and lock it up!'"

== Criticism ==
Variety reviewed the film on December 31, 1932. It described the film as "A mess of political tripe superlatively hoked up into a picture of strong popular possibilities...a cleverly executed commercial release... Huston plays the part so persuasively that witnessers will be tricked into accepting its monstrous exaggerations." Tone and Morley "carry what amount to walk-on parts and make them look like leads."

Reviewing it on April 1, 1933, Mordaunt Hall of The New York Times observed "It is a curious, somewhat fantastic and often melodramatic story, but nevertheless one which at this time is very interesting. It is concerned with a fictitious President of the United States named Judson Hammond ...who in the first sequences is portrayed as a careless partisan politician, becomes an earnest and conscientious President, who tackles the problems of unemployment, crime and the foreign debts something after the fashion of a Lincoln."

The film was labeled by The New Republic as "a half-hearted plea for Fascism". The Nation said that its purpose was "to convert innocent American movie audiences to a policy of fascist dictatorship in this country."

The blurb for a 1998 film series titled "Religion and the Founding of the American Republic" at The Library of Congress comments on the film as follows:

President Judson Hammond is transformed from party hack to dynamic leader after his miraculous recovery from an automobile accident. The good news: he reduces unemployment, lifts the country out of the Depression, battles gangsters and Congress, and brings about world peace. The bad news: he's Mussolini. Gabriel Over the White House is a delight precisely because of its confused ideology. Depending on your perspective, it's a strident defense of democracy and the wisdom of the common man, a good argument for benevolent dictatorship, a prescient anticipation of the New Deal, a call for theocratic governance, and on and on.

In 2018, Jeff Greenfield suggested that the film "offers us significant insights into what tempts countries to travel down an authoritarian road... Rushed into production with the financial help of publishing magnate William Randolph Hearst... it was designed as a clear message to President Franklin Delano Roosevelt that he might need to embrace dictatorial powers to solve the crisis of the Great Depression. (It was an idea embraced by establishment types like columnist Walter Lippmann, and the influential editorial pages of the New York Herald-Tribune.)"

Greenfield adds, "The movie was welcomed by, among others, FDR, who told the filmmakers 'it would do a lot of good.' (It was more than coincidental that the fireside chats, the public works programs and banking reforms all became part of FDR's 'first 100 days'.) Gabriel Over the White House was both a critical and commercial hit... It turned a tidy profit of some $200,000. But it faded into obscurity, in large measure because the idea of a 'benevolent dictatorship' seemed a lot less attractive after the degradation of Hitler, Mussolini and Stalin." However, Greenfield sees relevance today, and says the film is worth watching to understand our era.

In a 2013 New Yorker article, Richard Brody wrote:

It's hard to imagine such a film being made now (except in the novel's original form, as a dystopian fantasy); it's even harder to imagine any modern-day liberal exulting in it. The difference may be in the morality of power; it may also be in the incommensurable depth of the crisis faced in the Depression, about which the movie, though fantasy, seems utterly reportorial.

Newsweek's Jonathan Alter concurred in 2007 that the movie was meant to "prepare the public for a dictatorship."

"An aroma of fascism clung to the heavily edited release print", according to Leonard Leff.

It has been described as a "bizarre political fantasy" which "posits a favorable view of fascism."

Producer Walter Wanger, "a staunch Roosevelt supporter", bought the story in January 1933, two months before FDR's inauguration. After two weeks of script preparation, Wanger secured Hearst's financial backing of.

The film was released in Britain in June 1933, but was not a commercial success there. Newsreel film of the Royal Navy was spliced into the yacht sequence in the British version, implying that both Britain and the United States were cooperating to obtain disarmament. The movie made a net profit of $206,000.

== See also ==
- Films about angels
