= Orrisdale North =

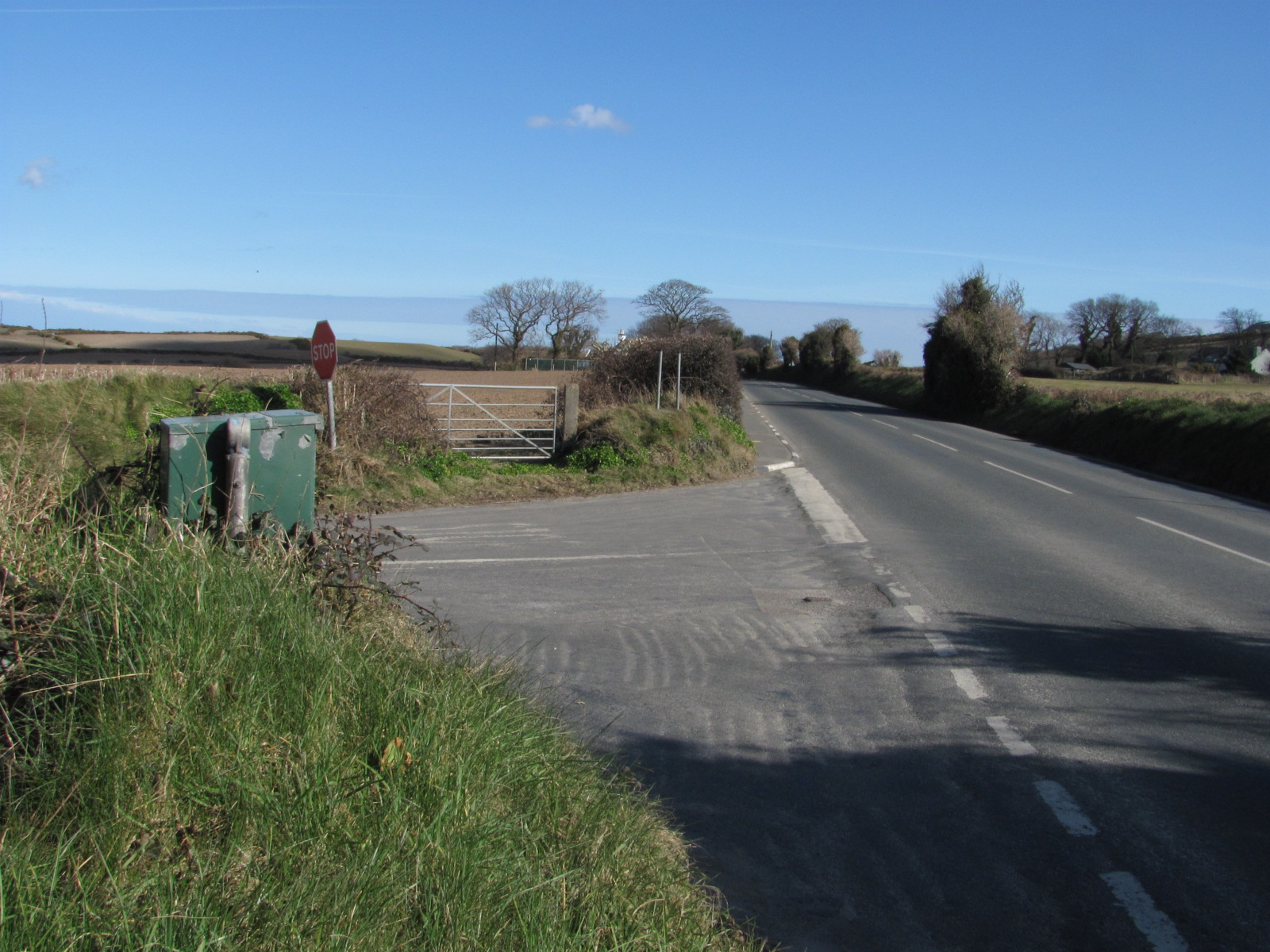
- The A3 Castletown to Ramsey Road at Orrisdale North with a North-East aspect towards Dub Cottage and Broughjaig Beg, Ballaugh.

- Location within Isle of Man
- 54°18′09.3″N 4°33′56.0″W

Orrisdale North (Manx pronunciation: [oɾəsˈdðɛ(ː)il]) is situated adjacent the 16th TT Milestone on the primary A3 Castletown to Ramsey road with the nearby junction with the tertiary C19 Orrisdale Loop Road and D13 Bollyn Road in the parish of Ballaugh in the Isle of Man.

== Motor-sport heritage ==
Orrisdale North was part of the 52.15 mile Highland Course (amended to 40.38 miles in 1906) and the 37.50 Mile Four Inch Course used for car racing including the 1904 Gordon Bennett Trial and the RAC Tourist Trophy car races held between 1905 and 1922.

In 1911, the Four Inch Course for automobiles was first used by the Auto-Cycling Union for the Isle of Man TT motorcycle races. This included Bishopscourt, Orrisdale North and Orrisdale South (Rhencullen) and the course later became known as the 37.73 mile Isle of Man TT Mountain Course which has been used since 1911 for the Isle of Man TT Races and from 1923 for the Manx Grand Prix races.

The C19 Orrisdale Loop Road and the D13 Bollyn Road between the A3 Rhencullen road junction and the Ballaugh Cronk has been used as a special timed stage for the Rally Isle of Man, Manx National Rally and the former Manx International Rally.

The musician Jake Drake-Brockman, a former member with the Liverpool pop group Echo & the Bunnymen, was involved in a fatal road traffic accident at Orrisdale North on 1 September 2009 while visiting the Isle of Man for the Manx Grand Prix when the vintage BSA motor-cycle he was riding was in collision with a converted ambulance.
