= Giant's Bread =

1930 Agatha Christie novel

- Dust-jacket illustration of the first UK edition
- Author: Mary Westmacott (pseudonym of Agatha Christie)
- Cover artist: Margaret Macadam
- Language: English
- Genre: Tragedy
- Publisher: Collins
- Publication date: April 1930
- Publication place: United Kingdom
- Media type: Print (hardback & paperback)
- Pages: 448
- Preceded by: The Mysterious Mr Quin
- Followed by: The Murder at the Vicarage

Giant's Bread is a novel by British writer Agatha Christie, first published in the UK by Collins in April 1930 and in the US by Doubleday later in the same year. The UK edition retailed for seven shillings and sixpence (7/6) and the US edition at $1.00. The dust jacket of the first UK edition was by the artist Margaret Macadam. Giant's Bread is the first of six novels Christie published under the pen name "Mary Westmacott".

== Plot summary ==
The novel opens with the premiere of The Giant, a modern opera performed at the newly opened London National Opera House. The work divides its audience, but the critic Carl Bowerman recognizes its originality and concludes that its composer, known publicly as Boris Groen, must be English. He remarks that Groen is the natural successor to the composer Vernon Deyre, believed to have been killed during the First World War. Sebastian Levinne, the opera house's owner, declines to discuss Groen's identity.

The narrative then recounts Vernon Deyre's life. Vernon grows up at Abbots Puisannts, his family's country estate, during the late Victorian period. His childhood is solitary and shaped by emotional distance within his family. He shows an early sensitivity to sound but initially develops an aversion to music. Over time, he forms friendships with Joe and Nell Vereker, a local girl who becomes emotionally important to him.

As a young man, Vernon befriends Sebastian Levinne, whose wealth and interest in the arts provide Vernon with opportunities he otherwise lacks. Financial difficulties prevent Vernon from reclaiming his family home, and he briefly works in his uncle's manufacturing firm. After attending a concert, he overcomes his hostility toward music and decides to pursue composition. His ambitions complicate his relationship with Nell, whom he loves but hesitates to marry because of financial insecurity.

Vernon is introduced to Jane Harding, a professional singer who encourages his musical development. He leaves his uncle's firm to focus on composing, while Nell, seeking security, becomes engaged elsewhere. Vernon completes his first major work, which Sebastian produces and which receives favorable attention. Shortly after the outbreak of the First World War, Vernon and Nell reconcile briefly and marry before he enlists.

Vernon is later reported killed in action. Believing him dead, Nell eventually marries George Chetwynd, a wealthy acquaintance who acquires Abbots Puisannts. In reality, Vernon survives after escaping from a prisoner-of-war camp but suffers memory loss following an accident. Unaware of his past, he lives under an assumed identity and works as a chauffeur.

Several years later, coincidences bring Vernon back into contact with figures from his former life. Jane and Sebastian recognize him and arrange medical care, enabling him to recover his memory. Vernon hopes to resume his former life, but misunderstandings and secrecy prevent reconciliation. He leaves England with Jane and resumes his musical career abroad.

After events that permanently sever his personal relationships, Vernon devotes himself entirely to composition. He completes The Giant, achieving artistic success while remaining personally isolated. The novel returns to its opening scene, revealing that the acclaimed composer Boris Groen is Vernon himself. He chooses to remain officially dead, allowing his work to stand apart from his personal history.

== Literary significance and reception ==
The Times Literary Supplement reviewed the book on 29 May 1930. The reviewer, unaware of the true identity of the author, praised the "arresting prologue" and stated that the early years of Vernon Deyre were "described with charm and capture the child's point of view."

The review in The New York Times Book Review (17 August 1930) declared, "Whoever is concealed beneath the pseudonym of Mary Westmacott may well feel proud of Giant's Bread. The blurb lends mystery to Miss Westmacott's identity. She has written half a dozen successful books under her own name, it says, but they have been so different from Giant's Bread that she decided to have it 'judged on its own merits and not in the light of previous success.' Who she is does not matter, for her book is far above the average of current fiction, in fact, comes well under the classification of a 'good book.' And it is only a satisfying novel that can claim that appellation. In Giant's Bread there are traces of the careful, detailed writing of the English novelist, and there are hints of Mary Roberts Rinehart's methods of mentioning a finished episode and explaining later how it all happened." The review concluded, "Each figure is well conceived, human and true."

Gerald Gould reviewed the novel in the 4 May 1930 issue of The Observer when he wrote, "Giant's Bread is an ambitious and surprisingly sentimental story about a young man with musical genius, mixed love-affairs, a lost memory, a family tradition, and other commodities out of the bag of novelist's tricks. Miss Westmacott shows narrative talent; but would presumably be more original if she strained less after originality. I should expect her book to be very popular."

== References to other works ==
In Book III, Chapter I(i) Jane Harding quotes the line "Come, tell me how you live!" from verse three of the White Knight's poem, "Haddocks' Eyes", from Chapter eight of Through the Looking-Glass (1871) by Lewis Carroll. This quote was later used by Christie as the title of her 1946 book of travel literature.

== Publication history ==
The dedication of the book reads: "To the memory of my best and truest friend, my mother."

- 1930, William Collins and Sons (London), April 1930, Hardcover, 448 pp
- 1930, Doubleday (New York), 1930, Hardcover, 358 pp
- 1964, Dell Books (New York), Paperback, 320 pp
- 1973, Arbor House (New York), Hardcover, 312 pp; ISBN 0-87795-058-X
- 1975, Fontana Books (Imprint of HarperCollins), Paperback, 288 pp; ISBN 0-00-616802-7
- 1980, Ulverscroft Large-print Edition, Hardcover, 577 pp; ISBN 0-7089-0405-X
