= Arthur Crookall =

English philanthropist (1873–1935)

Arthur Binns Crookall
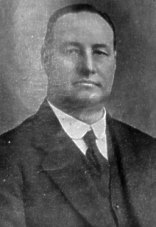

Mayor of the Borough of Douglas, Member of the House of Keys, Member of the Legislative Council, Captain of the Parish of Malew
- In office 1921–1935
- Monarch: King George V
- Governor: Sir William Fry, Sir Claude Hill, Sir Montagu Butler

Personal details
- Born: 1873 Blackpool, Lancashire
- Died: 15 June 1935 (aged 61–62) Harrogate, Yorkshire
- Party: Independent
- Spouse(s): Jane Callow 29 December 1896 – 15 May 1922 (her death); Alice Crookall (nee Callow) 9 August 1923 – 15 June 1935 (his death)
- Children: Gertrude Crookall; Jenny Crookall; Arthur Callow Crookall; William Crookall; Ramsey Crookall; Douglas Crookall
- Parent: James Crookall Rebekah Crookall
- Profession: Businessman / Philanthropist

Arthur Binns Crookall JP, MLC, CP (1873 - 15 June 1935), was a philanthropist, Mayor of the Borough of Douglas, a member of both branches of Tynwald, Chairman of the Isle of Man Steam Packet Company and Chairman of the Isle of Man Railway Company who at his death was one of the wealthiest people on the Isle of Man.

== Biography ==
=== Personal life ===
One of four children of James and Rebekah Crookall, Arthur Crookall was born in Blackpool, Lancashire in 1873 and moved to the Isle of Man at the age of 14. Having served his apprenticeship Crookall became a master painter trading at Duke Street, Douglas.

On 29 December 1896 Crookall married Jane Callow (20 April 1872 – 15 May 1922) at Maughold Parish Church. They set up the family home at 2 Osbourne Terrace, and later moved to "Woodlands", a palatial family home on Alexander Drive, Douglas. The marriage produced six children. Following the death of his first wife, Crookall married Alice Crookall (née Callow), the sister of his first wife and widow of his deceased half-brother John Robert Earnest Crookall (d. 16 September 1922) on 9 August 1923; the wedding was again at Maughold Parish Church.

Crookall became a leading member of the Isle of Man's Freemasons Society and was Master of the Tynwald Lodge. He also held Provincial rank, being Provincial Grand Senior Warden in 1917. He was a lifelong Methodist, and regularly attended Rosemount Methodist Church. Crookall's brother James (7 November 1887 – 27 July 1960) had served in the Merchant Navy and then settled in Vancouver, Canada, as a young boy leading to Crookall founding the North American Manx Association (NAMA). As President, he oversaw two 'Homecomings'. The first was in 1927 when Crookall, in his capacity as Mayor of Douglas, took a deputation which included two of his sons to Montreal to facilitate the visit. Crookall paid a second visit to North America when along with 22 other representatives from the Isle of Man he attended the Manx Convention in Cleveland, Ohio in August 1928. Following Crookall's death, his widow became Honorary President of the NAMA and oversaw a further "Homecoming" in May 1937, and attended numerous conventions in North America for the rest of her life.

In sport Crookall was widely regarded as a very able footballer, playing for Wanderers F.C.

=== Political career and business ===
For over 25 years, Crookall was a prominent Manx politician. He entered Douglas Town Council in 1911, and was Mayor of Douglas for five years from 1922 - 1927. He became a MHK for Douglas North in 1921, as well as being a borough councilor. He was elected to the Legislative Council in 1934, replacing Joseph Qualtrough.

Throughout his time as a councillor, he was a strong advocate for many enhancements to Douglas, such as the widening of Loch Promenade in 1929. This was required to reduce congestion at the junction of the Victoria Pier and the promenade and provided welcome employment for many of the town's men over the lean winter months.

During the First World War he oversaw the setting up of the Knockaloe Internment Camp. Crookall was also a leading figure in the establishment of the Manx Grand Prix.

He was Captain of the Parish of Malew for a few weeks before his death.

=== Philanthropy ===
Crookall was one of the greatest philanthropic benefactors in the history of the island. He donated hundreds of presents to poor children every Christmas. He also took a keen interest in Noble’s Hospital, and founded, in memory of his first wife, the Jane Crookall Maternity Home. The Home was first in Demesne Road, Douglas, but was replaced by a larger building after receiving £10,000 from Crookall's estate. Work started in March 1938, and the new Jane Crookall Maternity Home opened in 1939. The maternity home remained in use until 1992, today it is Crookall House, the HQ of the Department of Health and Social Care.

Crookall was also instrumental in the erection of the Douglas War Memorial, contributing the highest personal donation towards its construction.

=== Death ===
Crookall caught a cold which developed into pneumonia in early June 1935. He died in Harrogate, Yorkshire, on Saturday 15 June 1935. He was survived by his second wife and children.

His funeral was attended by every Manx senior dignitary. The Lieutenant Governor of the Isle of Man, Sir Montagu Butler, was joined by members of the Legislature, the Attorney General of the Isle of Man, the Mayor of Douglas and a large number of Freemasons. Crookall's coffin was borne into the chapel by two Captains of the Isle of Man Steam Packet Company, two representatives of the Isle of Man Railway Company, and two from the Road Services. The funeral was conducted by the Reverend John Webster, a personal friend of Crookall's. Following the service, his body was buried in Douglas Borough Cemetery.

Crookall's estate at the time of his death amounted to £130,000. Of this amount £10,000 was left in trust for the Jane Crookall Maternity Home. Additionally £2,000 was set aside out of the Residual Trust, the income on which continued to provide the poor children of Douglas with presents at Christmas. A collection of art was left to the Trustees of the Manx Museum.

== A.B. Crookall Trophy ==
The A.B. Crookall Trophy is awarded by the Manx Motorcycle Club to an individual for winning the Senior Manx Grand Prix.

Crookall was a strong supporter of the establishment of a supplementary race meeting on the Isle of Man to be held for amateur competitors, to be run over the existing Snaefell Mountain Course and to serve as a backup in case the Auto-Cycle Union decided to transfer the TT Races to England - which in the early 1920s was a distinct possibility.

First awarded at the inaugural meeting in 1923, the trophy is presented to the winner of the Senior Manx Grand Prix race, the finale to the racing programme.
