= Carolynn Sells =

English motorcycle racer

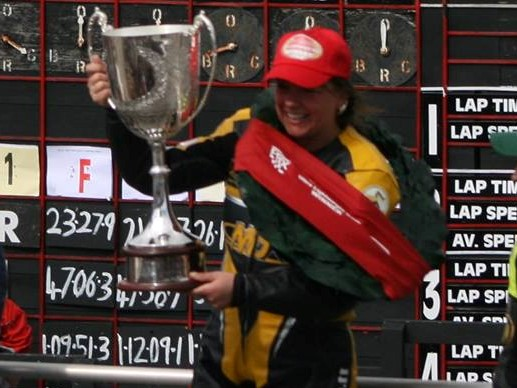
- Sells on the top step of the 2009 Ultra-Lightweight Manx Grand Prix Podium
- Nationality: British
- Born: 6 May 1973 (age 53); Preston, Lancashire
- Current team: Retired
- Bike number: 13 (Manx Grand Prix), 113 (Irish Roads)
Motorcycle racing career statistics
Manx Grand Prix career
Manx GPs contested	13
Active years	2003-2009
Manx GP wins	1
First Manx GP win	2009
Last Manx GP win	2009

Carolynn Sells (born 6 May 1973 in Preston, Lancashire) is an English former road racer. The highlight of her racing career was winning the 2009 Ultralightweight Manx Grand Prix, making her the first and as of 2024, the only woman to win a solo race on the Isle of Man TT Mountain Course, an achievement that earned her a Guinness World Record, and made her the Isle of Man Sportswoman of the Year 2009. She grew up around motorcycle racing, a sport her father Dave Sells took up when she was five years old. He began racing in the Manx Grand Prix when she was 12. She has stated that her sole purpose, when she began short circuit racing herself at the age of 27, was to obtain a National Race licence so she could race on the Isle of Man TT Mountain Course.{{}}

== Racing ==
Sells raced numerous times on the roads of the Isle of Man, including 13 Manx Grand Prix starts between 2003 and 2009.

Sells also raced on the roads mostly in Ireland (between 2004 & 2008).

However, Sells started her racing career by participating in short circuit club racing, mostly in mainland Britain (between 2000 & 2009); her first race was at Jurby Airfield on the Isle of Man on her father's TZ250 race bike.

Race Teams
Date range	Team
2000-2004	Trikbitz Racing
2003-2009	Martin Bullock Raceteam
2004	KS Performance Racing
2009	Paul Morrisey Racing

== Awards ==
Short Circuits:

- Andreas Racing Association (Isle of Man) Champion of Champions [400cc class], 2002

Manx Grand Prix:

- Guinness World Record, first female to win a solo motorcycle race on the Isle of Man TT Mountain Course at the Manx Grand Prix in 2009
- Les Williams Memorial Trophy for Best Performance by A Newcomer from the North West, 2003
- Lesley Ann Trophy for the Best Performance by a Female Competitor at the Manx Grand Prix - 2003, 2006, 2008 and 2009

Southern 100:

- First woman to have an overall win of a solo race at this event, during the 50th Anniversary meeting in 2005.
