= Francis Beart =

English motorcycle tuner

- Born: Herbert Maynard Francis Lutyens Beart; 6 March 1905; Ringsfield, near Beccles, Suffolk, England
- Died: 13 March 1983 (aged 78); Keyhaven, Hampshire, England
- Occupations: Motorcycle Racer, Mechanic, Tuner
- Years active: mid 1920s to early 1980s
- Spouse: Margaret Macadam

Francis Beart (6 March 1905 – 13 March 1983) was an English racing motor cyclist and motor cycle tuner, and later known also for tuning Formula Three racing cars. During World War II he worked as an engineer for the Bristol Aeroplane Company. Beart's bikes won eleven Manx GP wins, ten 2nds and three 3rds.

== Brooklands ==
During the 1930s, Beart became a regular competitor at the Brooklands, Surrey circuit. In 1937 he moved into a small workshop, described by The Motor Cycle as a 'shack' on the circuit and set about tuning engines for other people. In 1936, Beart, on a Grindlay Peerless fitted with a 500cc speedway type J.A.P. engine, established the all-time Test Hill Record of 6.99 seconds (an average of 34.55 mph). A record which stands to this day. Before Brooklands' closed in 1939, vehicles prepared by Beart claimed twelve track and three world records.

== Daytona ==
Then came the war and for six long years there was no motorised sport, but from mid-1945 peace-time pursuits, including racing, began to return. Francis Beart was soon to find himself even busier, tuning for many of the greats of the road racing game, including Johnny Lockett, Ken Bills, Cromie McCandless, Manliff Barrington, Denis Parkinson, Dan Crossly, Peter Romaine and many, many more. He became particularly involved with the Norton marque, and in fact acted as the company's official representative at Daytona, where Nortons tuned by him swept the board in the American classic for three years, 1949, 1950 and 1951.

== Formula 3 ==
Beart temporarily quit motorcycles for cars. The early 1950s saw a boom era for light-weight 500cc Formula 3 cars which resulted in a demand for his services. He worked with the Cooper Car Company to develop a version of their Mk VII. The Beart Cooper was driven by Eric Brandon and Alan Brown and occasionally by Stirling Moss. Later in '53 and '54 it was driven by Stuart Lewis-Evans.

In 1958, with Formula 3 in decline, he returned to his interest in motorcycles.

== Norton ==
Beart tuned a pair of Nortons to be raced by Ernie Washer in the Manx Grand Prix in 1957. The combination of Beart's tuning ability and Washer's riding skills resulted in a 2nd in the 500cc Senior race, with a first and a new lap record in 1958. This was followed by a series of Manx GP successes, including Peter Middleton's victory in the 1959 Junior and Ellis Boyce's victory in the same event the following year. Other riders who benefitted from Beart's tuning included Mike Hailwood, Joe Dunphy, Terry Shepherd and Bob Anderson. Assisted by Phil Kettle, the Guildford-based tuner, he continued to prepare Nortons until well into the 1960s.

== Aermacchi ==
Eventually, Beart turned his attention fulltime to Aermacchi motorcycles. His first Aermacchi success came in the 1969 Junior TT in the Isle of Man, when the Australian Jack Findlay rode a 350cc Aermacchi Ala d'Oro into third place. The machine bore all the hallmarks of Francis Beart, with some detailed preparation and weight saving features. Just some of the modifications included drilled and lightened components, such as engine mounting plates, rear sprockets and brake torque arms. Besides Findlay's TT success, the same machine with Clive Brown aboard won the 1970, Junior Manx Grand Prix. Francis Beart continued his involvement with Aermacchi until his retirement in the early 1980s.

== Personal life ==
Francis Beart was born in 1905 in Ringsfield, a small village near Beccles, in Suffolk. His family moved to a farm in Yorkshire (gifted by his grandmother). Eventually the family moved down to London. Beart was schooled at Dulwich College, before the family moved again to Sutton.

Beart married the British Illustrator Margaret Macadam in 1936. In 1953 they purchased Brook Lodge, a three storey property which had been a guest house, in Albury, Surrey, but this had dry rot and was demolished. The Bearts developed the former stables and coach house for living accommodation and workshop. At the time of his death, in March 1983, they lived at Keyhaven, near Lymington in the New Forest.

== Vehicles sold at auction ==
In 2013, a 1966 Norton Manx 350cc, prepared by Beart and raced by Joe Dunphy and Keith Heckles, was sold at Bonhams in the UK for £61,980, setting a new world record for a Manx sold at auction. In 2015, a 1961 Norton Manx 350cc, prepared by Beart for Jimmy Guthrie, was sold by Bonhams in Las Vegas for $75,900.
