= Frank Wootton (artist) =

English painter

Frank Albert Antony Wootton OBE PPGAvA (30 July 1914 – 21 April 1998) was an aviation artist, famous for his works depicting the Royal Air Force during the Second World War.

== Early life ==
Wootton was born in Milford on Sea, Hampshire in 1914. His mother died while Frank was still of school-age, and he was raised by his father, a seaman in the Merchant Navy.

He attended art school in 1928 at the age of fourteen, winning a travel scholarship and a gold medal from the Eastbourne School of Art and a prize of £25, which he used to fund a three-month trip to Germany, painting murals.

== Early career and World War II ==
In the 1930s, Wootton was commissioned by Edward Saunders to do art and book illustrations. In this time he wrote several books on art instruction, one of which, How to Draw Aircraft, went on to be a best-seller, In 1939, he volunteered for the Royal Air Force but instead was invited by the commander-in-chief of the Allied Air Forces to accept a special duty commission as war artist to the R.A.F. and Royal Canadian Air Force. He painted RAF subjects from England to France and Belgium before travelling to Southeast Asia at the end of World War II. During this period, he also worked on motoring art, notably creating illustrations for motor manufacturers' sales brochures and various publications. It is for this work advancing the field of aviation art, that Wootton is recognised as "probably the finest aviation artist of all time".

In the late 1930's he produced How to Draw Cars, an art instruction book featuring many of his motor illustrations, which was published by Studio Publications in 1949. Volume 2 of this series was published in 1955.

== Later life ==
The 1983 inaugural of the National Air and Space Museum featured an exhibition on Wootton's work. At Home in the Sky, a book on Wootton, was published in commemoration of the event.

Frank Wootton was also an extraordinary landscape and equestrian artist. His love of horses was unparalleled and he became vice-President of the Society of Equestrian Artists.

He was commissioned to paint the greatest steeplechaser of all time, Arkle, in 1966 - 'Arkle with Pat Taaffe up'. He also had racehorses in training with Fred Winter.

Later books included The Landscape Paintings of Frank Wootton (1989) and Frank Wootton: 50 Years of Aviation Art (1992).

For service in World War II, Frank Wootton was awarded the Order of the British Empire in 1995. He died in April 1998, at Alfriston, Sussex.
