= Douglas J. Pirie =

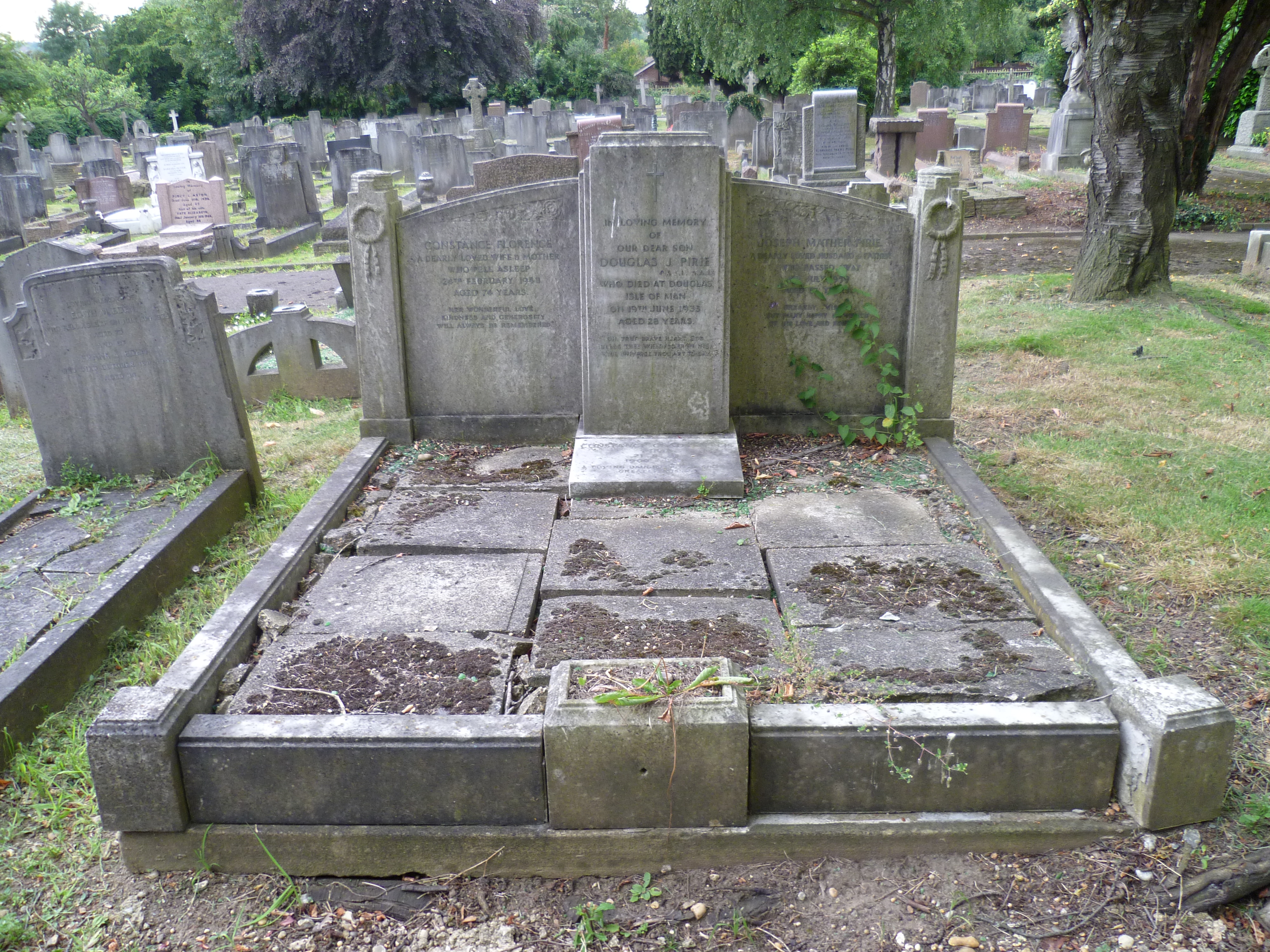
Grave of Douglas J. Pirie at Southgate Cemetery.

Douglas Joseph Pirie (11 May 1907 – 19 June 1935) was an English motorcycle racer who won the Manx Grand Prix. He died, aged 28, in an accident during the 1935 Isle of Man TT races. He is buried at Southgate Cemetery, London.

== Douglas Pirie Trophy ==
The Douglas Pirie Trophy is awarded to the winner of the Junior Manx Grand Prix. The current recipient is Nathan Harrison.
