= Douglas War Memorial =

War memorial in Douglas, Isle of Man

War Memorial
- Isle of Man
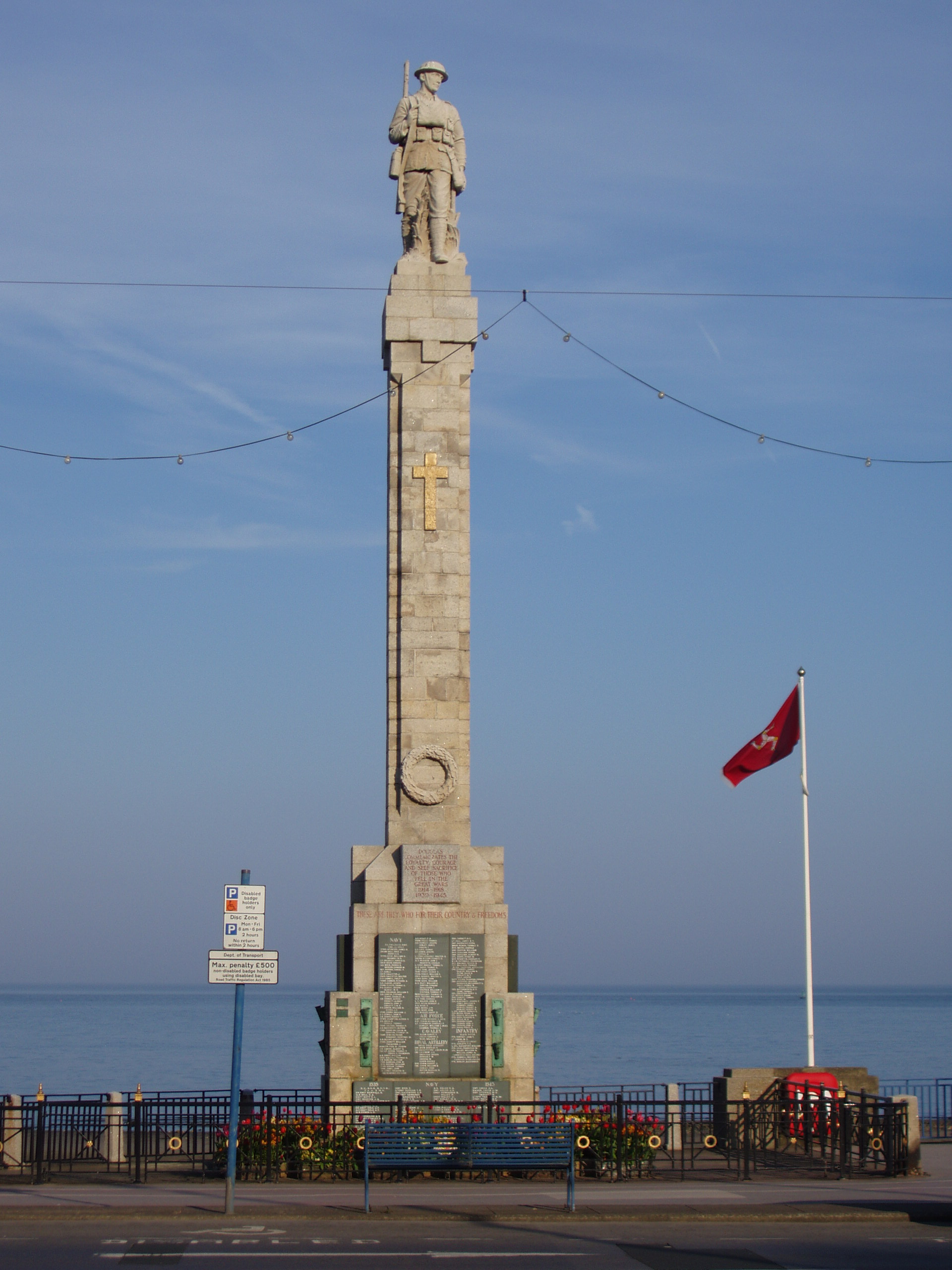
- The memorial, photographed on 20 April 2008
- For All soldiers killed on duty during World War I and World War II
- Unveiled: 1924
- Location: 54°9′20.9″N 4°28′38.9″W near Douglas, Isle of Man
- Designed by: Ewart Crellin (architect)

The war memorial in Douglas, Isle of Man is dedicated to those who died during World War I and World War II. The rolls of names are segregated by service and year of death.

The inscriptions on the memorial read:

- Douglas commemorates the loyalty, courage, and self sacrifice of those who fell in the Great Wars 1914 - 1918, 1939 - 1945
- These are they who for their country & freedoms / sake loved not their lives unto the death / therefore they shall be as the stones of a crown / lifted up as an ensign upon this land (over four sides of the memorial separated by /)

== Design ==
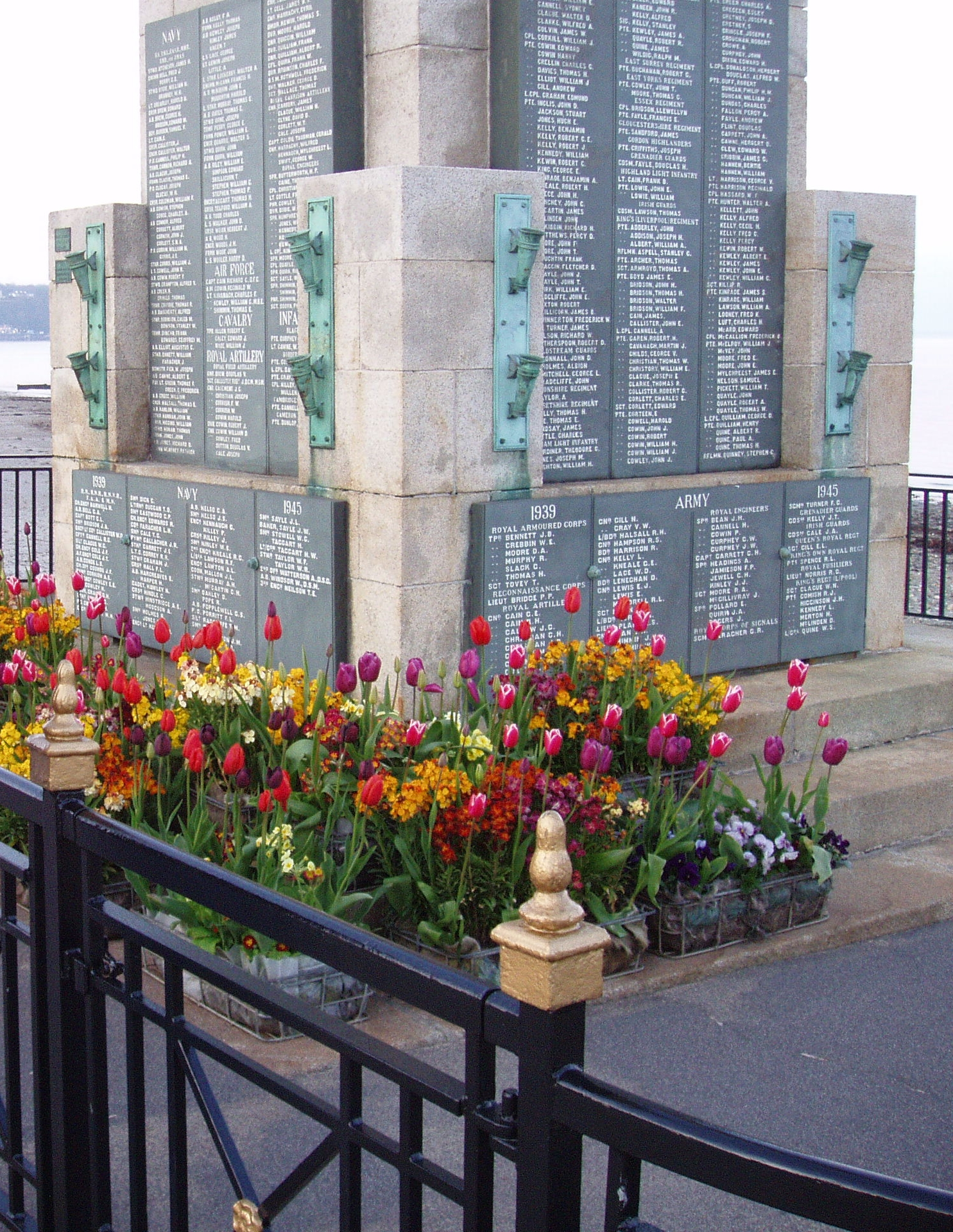
Details of the memorial's base and surrounding guard rail.

The memorial, including the statue at top, stands about 50 feet (15 m) high and has a stone base rising in four steps, upon which is a tall column of Manx granite, surmounted by the three ton figure of a soldier called "The Manxman". It was designed to have a flower garden and guard rail surrounding it and stands on what was once a bandstand area. The front facade features sculptures of a wreath and holy cross. Rolls of names and copper vases for flowers are affixed to the base.

The monument was designed by Ewart Crellin (1887–1950) who also designed the Lezayre War Memorial while sculptures were carved by Harry Hems & Co. of Exeter who also carved the St. Matthews War Memorial. The design was unveiled to the public in 1922. The monument was erected in May 1924.

The monument was dedicated only to the fallen members of World War I due to the date of its design and introduction. Names of fallen World War II members were later incorporated into the statue.

== Location ==
The memorial is located along Harris Promenade, across from the Villa Marina, in Douglas, Isle of Man.
