= Peter Middleton (motorcyclist) =

British motorcyclist (1931–2019)

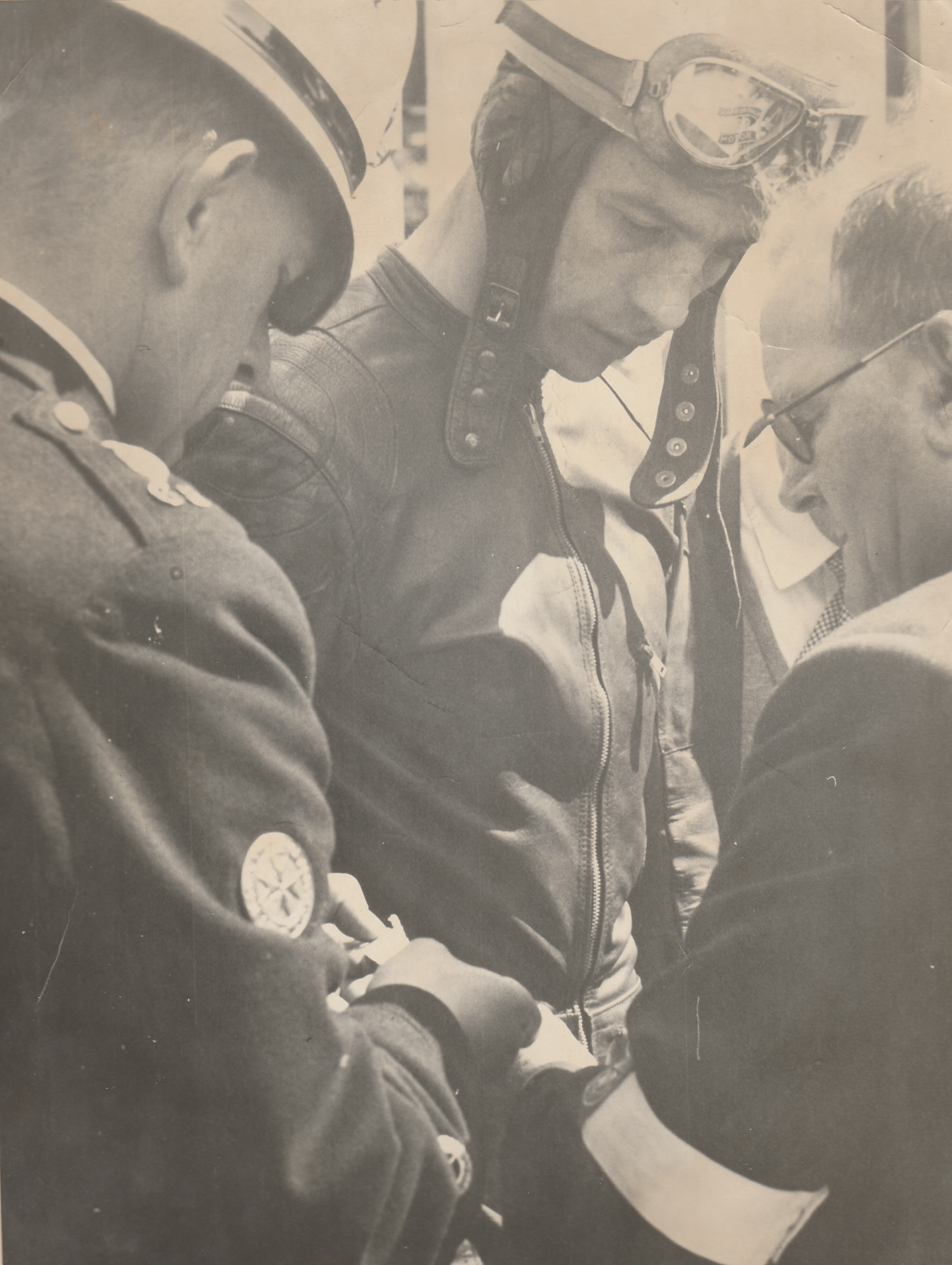
- Born: Peter Charles Middleton; 3 December 1931; Doncaster, England
- Died: 24 May 2019 (aged 87); Wakefield, England
- Spouse(s): Patricia Hughes (m, 1962; div, 1984)

Peter Middleton (3 December 1931 – 24 May 2019) was a British motorcycle racer in the late 1950s and early 1960s. He started his Manx Grand Prix career by finishing second in the 1957 Senior Newcomers race and two years later was the winner of the 1959 Junior MGP, before moving on to the Isle of Man TT for a further three years. He was the 1962 Gold Cup winner at Oliver's Mount, Scarborough where he broke Geoff Duke's seven-year lap record with a 4-speed gearbox.

== Selected career statistics ==
Date	Circuit / Race	Laps	Machine	Pos.	Notes
28 May 1957	Alton Towers 500cc	8	Norton 500	1st	
3-7 June 1957	MGP Senior Newcomers	4	Norton 500	2nd	
3-7 June 1957	MGP Senior	8	Norton 500	9th	
14th Sept 1957	Oliver's Mount	16	Norton 500	2nd	
20th Sept 1958	Oliver's Mount	16	Norton 500	1st	
Sept 1958	MGP Senior	7	Norton 500	7th	
Sept 1959	MGP Junior	7	Norton 350	1st	
Sept 1959	MGP Senior	7	Norton 500	6th	
Sept 1960	TT Junior	6	Norton 350	15th	
Sept 1960	TT Senior	6	Norton 500	14th	
6 Aug 1960	Ulster Grand Prix	20	Norton 350	9th	
6 Aug 1960	Ulster Grand Prix	20	Norton 500	10th	
3 Apr 1961	Cadwell Park Junior Solo Final	8	Norton 500	3rd	
3 Apr 1961	Cadwell Park Easter Senior Final	12	Norton 500	3rd	
22 May 1961	Cadwell Park Senior Solo Final	12	Norton 500	3rd	
1 Apr 1962	Mallory Park (event 3) Final	20	Norton 350	5th	
23 Apr 1962	Cadwell Senior Scratch Final	8	Norton 500	3rd	
11 Jun 1962	Cadwell Junior Scratch Final	8	Norton 350	3rd	
11 Jun 1962	Cadwell Senior Solo Scratch Final	8	Norton 500	2nd	
17 Jun 1962	Oliver's Mount – "Cock 'o the North"	14	Norton 350	1st	Fastest Lap
17 Jun 1962	Oliver's Mount – "Cock 'o the North"	14	Norton 500	1st	Fastest Lap
24 Jun 1962	Ouston 350cc	12	Norton 350	1st	
24 Jun 1962	Ouston 500cc	12	Norton 500	1st	
6 Aug 1962	Cadwell Park Junior Scratch Final	8	Norton 350	1st	Fastest Lap
6 Aug 1962	Cadwell Coronation Trophy Final	8	Norton 500	1st	Fastest Lap
16th Sept 1962	Cadwell International Junior Final	12	Norton 350	2nd	
16th Sept 1962	Cadwell International Championship Final	12	Norton 500	4th	
22nd Sept 1962	Oliver's Mount Final	16	Norton 500	1st	Fastest Lap

== Death ==
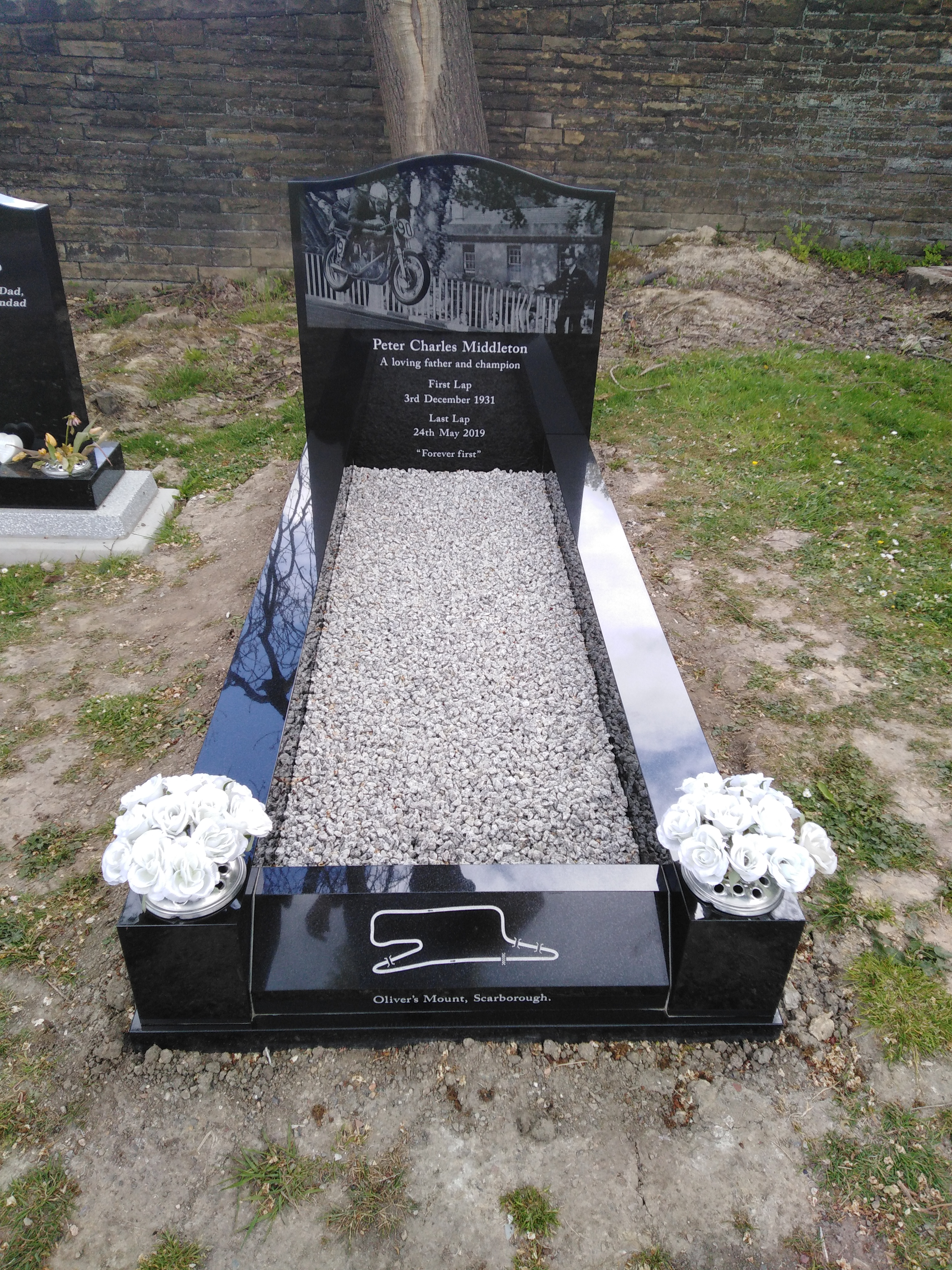
Peter Middleton's grave. Clough Lane Cemetery, Liversedge. West Yorkshire.

Middleton died of leukemia on 24 May 2019 at the Pinderfield's Hospital, Wakefield.

== Tribute ==
"The Fastest Lap: A Tribute to Peter Middleton" is scheduled to be released on the 24th of May 2024 - the 5 year anniversary of his death. The film is being directed by Middleton's son, Pete Middleton and features several interviews including world championship riders, John Cooper and Mick Chatterton.
