= Christopher Airay =

Christopher Airay (1601 – 18 October 1670) was an English preacher and a pioneer in English logic.

== Life ==
Airay was born at Clifton in Westmoreland in 1600/01. Anthony Wood states that he became a student in The Queen's College, Oxford and earned a Master of Arts. In 1627 he was elected fellow. About this time he entered into holy orders, according to the statutes of the house, and became a preacher. He was created B.D. in 1642.

Airay was presented to the living of Milford, Hampshire; where he died on St. Luke's Day, 1670, and was buried in the chancel of his church. His epitaph read:

Memoriæ sacrum Christopheri Airay, S. T. Bac. olim Coll. Reg. Oxon. socii et hujus ecclesiæ Vicarii vigilantissimi, viri summæ integritatis, judicii acerrimi et ingenii literarum omnium capacis; qui difficillime seculo inter æstuantes rerum fluctus clavum rectum tenuit. Mortalitatem tandem exuit 18 Oct. annos natus 69.

== Works ==
Whilst still at the university he published anonymously his one known book, viz.: ‘Fascicvlvs Præceptorvm Logicorvm in gratiam juventutis academicæ compositus et nunc primum typis donatus. Oxoniæ excudebat Gvlielmus Tvrner Academiæ Typographus. An. D. 1628. Cum Priuilegio’ (pp. 224). The printer signs the ‘Præfatio.’ The following are the main headings: Lib. 1, De Prædicabilibus; 2. De Anteprædicamentis; 3, De Propositione; 4. De Demonstratione; 5. De Syllogismo Topico; 6. De Syllogismo Sophistico. Logic is mixed with metaphysics. A second edition appeared in 1660.
