= Manx Grand Prix =

Motorsport Event

- Venue: Snaefell Mountain Course
- First race: 1923
- Previous names: Manx Amateur Road Races
- Most wins (rider): Bob Heath (11)

The Manx Grand Prix motorcycle races are held on the Isle of Man TT Course (or 'Mountain Circuit') annually, usually at the end of August and early September. Traditionally the event has been staged over a two week period but this was reduced in 2022 to nine days. The 100th anniversary of the event was celebrated in 2023.

The MGP or Manx (as it is more commonly known) is considered to be the amateur rider's alternative and a learning experience for the Isle of Man TT races held in May/June. The event differs from the TT in that it does not cater for sidecars. A 'Classic TT' race category for historic racing machines was added in 2013 as part of the Manx Government Department of Economic Development's expansion to create what is termed Festival of Motorcycling to breathe new life into the event. These new races also allowed for professional and experienced riders to compete.

The event consists of six three or four-lap races of the 60.70 km (37.72 mi) circuit which begins at the TT Grandstand in Douglas, the island's capital. The separate classes have varied year to year. The proposed schedule for 2024 consists of the Lightweight, Classic, Classic Junior, Junior, Senior and Classic Superbike races.

== History ==
The MGP began in 1923 as the 'Manx Amateur Road Races' or MARC. The MARC continued until 1930 when renamed as the Manx Grand Prix. Problems were encountered initially over the definition of an 'Amateur' and the first rules were extensive and open to various interpretations. Nowadays, many riders who have achieved success in the MGP move on to race in the TT but regulations prevent them from entering the race in contemporary motorcycles, limiting participation to the vintage motorcycle classes. Chris Palmer (former British 125cc champion) and the late Richard Britton both followed this route in 2005 aboard Manx Nortons.

In 1989 Gloria Clark became the first woman to race in the MGP. In 1991, she gained an entry into the Guinness Book Of Records for being the fastest lady on the TT Circuit. Carolynn Sells was entered into the Guinness World Records as the first female winner on the Snaefell Mountain Course of the Ultra-Lightweight event at the 2009 Manx Grand Prix.

The MGP is organised by the Manx Motor Cycle Club (MMCC) based on the rules and regulations of the Auto-Cycle Union (ACU) which governs most British motorcycle events.

In 2026 Mauro Poncini, 29, from Switzerland, died from a crash on the opening lap during qualifying at Cruickshanks in Ramsey, and Sam Naughton, 37, from Castletown, Isle of Man, died following a crash during qualifying at Doran's Bend.

== Classes ==
The Newcomers class caters for riders who have no previous experience of the Mountain Circuit. Such a class does not feature in the programme of the TT and is thus the only opportunity for newcomers to race the circuit in competition. Classes are usually over-subscribed as a result. Riders are limited to machinery with a capacity not exceeding 750cc and must wear coloured bibs over their leathers during 'Practice' (see below). Newcomers are also permitted to submit an application for any of the other classes but may or may not be granted a ride depending on their levels of experience.

A variety of makes and capacities of machines are grouped together in Classes.

For 2024 the Classes are:

Lightweight Manx Grand Prix (250cc 2-stroke, 200-401cc 4-stroke, Supersport 400, or Moto3). Each category of motorcycle has its own winner.

Classic Senior Manx Grand Prix (500cc 2-strokes before 1968 or 4-strokes before 1973)

Classic Junior Manx Grand Prix (smaller capacity 350cc machines). Past winners include Michael Dunlop, Lee Johnston, Michael Rutter, Jamie Coward, and Dominic Herbertson.

Junior Manx Grand Prix (Supertwin machines, similar to Isle of Man Supertwin rules).

Senior (Supersport specifications)

Classic Superbike (up to 1997).

CLUBMAN RACING

The Manx Motorcycle Club have also announced that amateur riders will compete in the Lightweight, Classic Junior, Classic Senior, and Classic Superbike Races.

Classified with either ‘TT’ or ‘Clubman’ status competitors who have entries accepted for the 2024 Isle of Man TT Races will be determined as TT, whilst those outside of that criteria will be classified as Clubman and will be presented with a specific set of awards.

As mentioned previously, newcomers must wear a coloured bib (usually orange or yellow) during practice sessions to distinguish themselves to other riders. Similarly, classic riders are obliged to wear white bibs.

Those who participated in the 2024 Isle of Man TT must participate in the Classic categories.

== Format of the races ==
The format varies from time to time but the first part of the event is devoted to 'Practice.' Riders are given the opportunity to familiarise themselves with the course and must complete a minimum number of laps at a satisfactory speed in order to qualify for the races held subsequently.

On the first evening of Practice, Newcomers are escorted around the course on a speed-controlled lap by the Travelling Marshals (marshals on bikes who lap the course regularly to check for problems). They are then at liberty to circulate at their desired pace.

=== MGP 2024 SCHEDULE* ===
Sun 18 Aug	Qualifying
Mon 19 Aug	Qualifying
Tue 20 Aug	Qualifying
Wed 21 Aug	Qualifying
Thu 22 Aug	Qualifying
Fri 23 Aug	Qualifying Lightweight Manx Grand Prix - 3 laps Classic Senior Manx Grand Prix - 4 laps
Sat 24 Aug	Warm-Up Lap Classic Junior Manx Grand Prix - 3 laps Junior Manx Grand Prix - 4 laps
Mon 26 Aug Bank Holiday	Warm-Up Lap Senior Manx Grand Prix - 4 laps Classic Superbike Manx Grand Prix - 4 laps

*This is a Provisional schedule and is subject to consultation and road closure approval by the Department for Infrastructure, in accordance with the Road Races Act 2016. Specific timings will be announced in due course.

In the event of bad weather races can be delayed for later on the same days or even rescheduled for Tuesday or Thursday. In the past racing has extended beyond Friday and race distances can also be reduced by the organisers.

== Famous MGP names ==
The Manx Grand Prix serves as a developmental event for riders before they achieve international recognition, with the likes of Martin Finnegan, Davy Morgan, Ray Porter and Kenneth McCrea, who are now established members of the Isle of Man TT, who also compete in road racing events elsewhere in the British Isles, with a particular focus at the Irish road racing circuit.

Other famous names from bygone decades include Freddie Frith, Phil Read and the great Geoff Duke and the great Mike Casey winner of 1995, all of whom raced at the TT – Duke and Read went on to become multiple world champions.

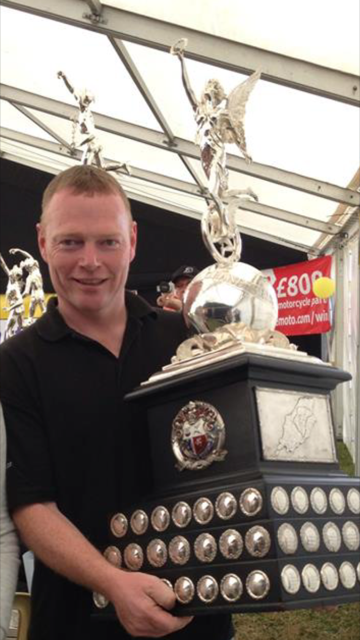
The late Gary Carswell, Senior race winner in 1997, with the A.B. Crookall Trophy

'King of the Mountain' Joey Dunlop, the second most successful TT rider of all time with 26 victories, also tried his hand at the MGP on a Classic Aermacchi and achieved a podium finish.

== Awards ==
Various awards are given at the MGP each year. The Manx Motorcycle Club relies exclusively on entry fees and donations to fund the awards. Many trophies and cups have been donated in the past and range from 'Fastest Lap of the meeting' to "Most meritorious performance by a newcomer."

The winner of the Junior Manx Grand Prix receives the Douglas Pirie Trophy whilst the victor of the Senior Manx Grand Prix is awarded the A.B. Crookall Trophy. Convention however dictates that the A.B. Crookall Trophy can only be won once, as the winner of the Senior Manx Grand Prix is then obliged to enter the TT Races.

All riders completing a race receive a Finisher's Medal, and any who finish a race within a certain percentage of the winner's overall time are given a 'Replica.' Replicas are awarded to those finishing within 110% of the winner's time. Team awards are also raced for although they are not always awarded every year. Such awards are not only aimed at riders competing for the same sponsor but also riders from the same motorcycle club. In total there are about 42 separate awards and the list will doubtless continue to grow.

== Other MGP fortnight events ==
The MGP is popular with many motorcycle fans and is viewed as having a more relaxed atmosphere to that of the TT. Throughout the duration of the races there are various club meetings (particularly of classic machines) and there is also a Classic Parade on closed roads. Unlike the TT there is no funfair on Douglas Promenade but various entertainments include visiting and local music acts and the Manx 3-day Trial.

== Total overall Manx Grand Prix race winners (including Manx Amateur Road Race winners) ==
Rider	Wins
Bob Heath	11
Ryan Farquhar, Roy Richardson	10
Bill Swallow	9
Denis Parkinson, Richard Swallow, Bob Jackson	5
Michael Dunlop, Austin Munks, Ewan Hamilton, Alan 'Bud' Jackson, Chris McGahan	4
Ken Bills, James Courtney, Michael Evans, Jason Griffiths, Dan Kneen, Ricky Mitchell, Chris Palmer, Doug Pirie, Dave Pither, Richard Quayle	3
Craig Atkinson, Gordon Blackley, Andrew Brady, Eric Briggs, Jimmy Buchan, Maurice Cann, James Courtney, Don Crossley, Barry Davidson, Tony Duncan, Chris Fargher, Jack Findlay, Nathan Harrison, Alan Holmes, Tim Hunt, Tom Knight, Norman Kneen, Eric Lea, George Lindsay, Oliver Linsdell, Phillip McCallen, Dave Milling, Bernard Murray, Len Randles, Michael Russell, Craig Ryding, Dan Sayle, Martin Sharpe, Michael Sweeney, Geoff Tanner, Malcolm Uphill, Brian Venables, Clive Watts, Barry Wood, Buddy Yeardsley	2
Rex Adams, Dave Arnold, Mark Baldwin, Brian Ball, Adam Barclay, Nigel Barton, Nigel Beattie, Simon Beck, Gavin Bell, George Bell, Peter Bell, Alan Bennallick, Dave Bennett, Alan Bennie, Gordon Blackley, Ellis Boyce, Colin Breeze, Derek Brien, Dave Broadhead, Clive Brown, George Buchan, Graham Cannell, Phil Carpenter, John Carr, Gary Carswell, Mike Casey, Alan Cooper, Paul Corrin, George Costain, Dennis Craine, Eddie Crooks, Dickie Dale, Harold Daniell, Gordon Daniels, Peter Darvill, Snuffy Davies, Nigel Davies, Robin Dawson, Tom Dickie, Wayne Dinham, Tommy Diver, H.G. Dobbs, Chris Dowling, Paul Duckett, Robin Duffy, Geoff Duke, Robert Dunlop, Samuel Dunlop, Joe Dunphy, Derek Ennett, Dave East, Michael (Miggy) Evans, Bob Farmer, Gordon Farmer, Derek Farrant, John Findlay, Frank Fox, Freddie Frith, Elwyn Fryer, Simon Fulton, Alex George, Phil Gilder, Norman Gledhill, Grant Goodings, Seamus Green, Selwyn Griffiths, Billy Guthrie, Rod Harris, Phil Haslam, Paul Harbinson, Bob Hayes, Steve Hazlett, Russ Henley, Dave Hickman, Jamie Hodson, Rob Hodson, Chris Hook, Ken Huggett, Dave Hughes, Paul Hunt, Alan Jackson, Bud Jackson, Nick Jefferies, Griff Jenkins, Geoff Johnson, Ross Johnson, Dave Johnston, Gordon Keith, Neil Kent, Wayne Kirwan, Mike Kneen, Tom Knight, Steve Kuenne, Con Law, Gavin Lee, George Linder, Darran Lindsay, Joe Lindsay, Gary Linham, Ernie Lyons, Dave Madsen-Mygdal, Tim Maher, Cromie McCandless, Bob McIntyre, Sam McClements, Philip McGurk, Stephen McIlvenna, Sean McStay, Harry Meageen, Ernie Merrill, Peter Middleton, Ned Minihan, Donald Mitchell, Dave Moffitt, Dave Montgomery, Nigel Moore, Davy Morgan, Ian Morris, Steve Moynihan, J.M.Muir, Ian Newton, Dave O'Leary, Alan Oversby, Mark Parrett, Len Parsons, Cliff Patterson, Ian Patterson, Dave Pither, Gary Radcliffe, Steve Rae, Brian Raynor, Phil Read, Paddy Reid, Frank Reynolds, Peter Richardson, Roy Richardson, Kevin Riley, Eddie Roberts, Nigel Rollason, Peter Romaine, Andrew Soar, Carolynn Sells, Martin Sharpe, Alan Shepherd, Robin Sherry, Danny Shimmin, Dave Silvester, John Simpson, Mick Skene, Billy Smith, Stephen Smith, Alan Steele, Matt Stevenson, Keith Stewart, Steve Sturrock, Ralph Sutcliffe, Roger Sutcliffe, James Kelly Swanston, Chris Collard, Peter Symes, Keith Taylor, Keith Townsend, Les Trotter, Peter Turnball, Nick Turner, Steve Ward, Ernie Washer, Tom Weeden, John Wetherall, Charlie Williams, David Williams, Steve Williams, J H 'Crasher' White, Frank Whiteway	1

== Current Manx Grand Prix lap records ==
Category	Rider	Machine	Year	Time	Average speed
Outright Manx Grand Prix	Michael Evans	Suzuki 750 cc	2017	18 mins 25.495 secs	122.866 mph
Outright Classic TT	Bruce Anstey	Yamaha YZR500	2017	17 mins 45.348 secs	127.496 mph
Newcomers Race 'A'	Brad Vicars	Honda CBR600RR	2017	19 mins 03.471 secs	118.786 mph
Newcomers Race 'B'	Marc Ironside	Kawasaki 650 cc	2016	20 mins 22.56 secs	111.101 mph
Superbike Classic TT	Bruce Anstey	Yamaha YZR500	2017	17 mins 45.348 secs	127.496 mph
Lightweight Classic TT	Bruce Anstey	Honda 250 cc	2017	18 mins 47.438 secs	120.475 mph
Senior Classic TT	John McGuinness	Paton 500 cc	2016	19 mins 58.39 secs	113.342 mph
Junior Classic TT	Lee Johnston	MV Agusta 350 cc	2014	21 mins 30.66 secs	105.239 mph
Junior Manx Grand Prix	Michael Evans	Honda CBR600RR	2017	18 mins 46.088 secs	120.619 mph
Lightweight Race	Nigel Beattie	Honda 250 cc	2002	19 mins 53.8 secs	113.770 mph
Supertwin Race	Rob Hodson	Kawasaki 650 cc	2015	19 mins 45.75 secs	114.550 mph
Senior Manx Grand Prix	Michael Evans	Suzuki 750 cc	2017	18 mins 25.495 secs	122.866 mph

== Awards ==
=== Race winner trophies ===
Race	Trophy	Rider	Machine	Year	Average speed
Senior Manx Grand Prix	A.B. Crookall Trophy	Stephen Smith	Kawasaki 600cc	2022	121.796 mph
Junior Manx Grand Prix	Douglas Pirie Trophy	Nathan Harrison	Honda 600cc	2019	120.818 mph
Lightweight Race	The Motor Cycle Trophy	James Hind	Yamaha 250 cc	2019	115.200 mph
Lightweight Race	Albert Moule Trophy	James Hind	Yamaha 250 cc	2019	115.200 mph
500cc Classic TT Race	Francis Beart Trophy	Ian Lougher	Paton 499 cc	2014	104.481 mph
350cc Junior Classic TT Race	Harold Rowell Trophy	Lee Johnson	MV Agusta 350 cc	2014	104.134 mph
250cc Classic TT Lightweight Race	Phil Read Cup	Tom Jackson	Suzuki 249 cc	2014	93.062 mph
Newcomers Race 'A'	Aitcheson Trophy	Peter Wilkinson	Yamaha 600 cc	2015	111.552 mph
Newcomers Race 'B'	Braddan Bridge Trophy	Gary Vines	Yamaha 250 cc	2015	104.563 mph
Newcomers Race 'C'	Wayne Hamilton Memorial Trophy	Elwyn Fryer	Kawasaki 400 cc	2015	101.051 mph
Formula 1 Classic TT	Phink Trophy	Bruce Anstey	Yamaha 500 cc	2014	121.957 mph
Formula 2 Classic TT	Ewan Hamilton Trophy	Ian Lougher	Yamaha 250 cc	2014	107.993 mph

== See also ==
- Isle of Man TT
- North West 200
- Ulster Grand Prix
