= Guy Martin =

British television presenter and former motorcycle racer (born 1981)

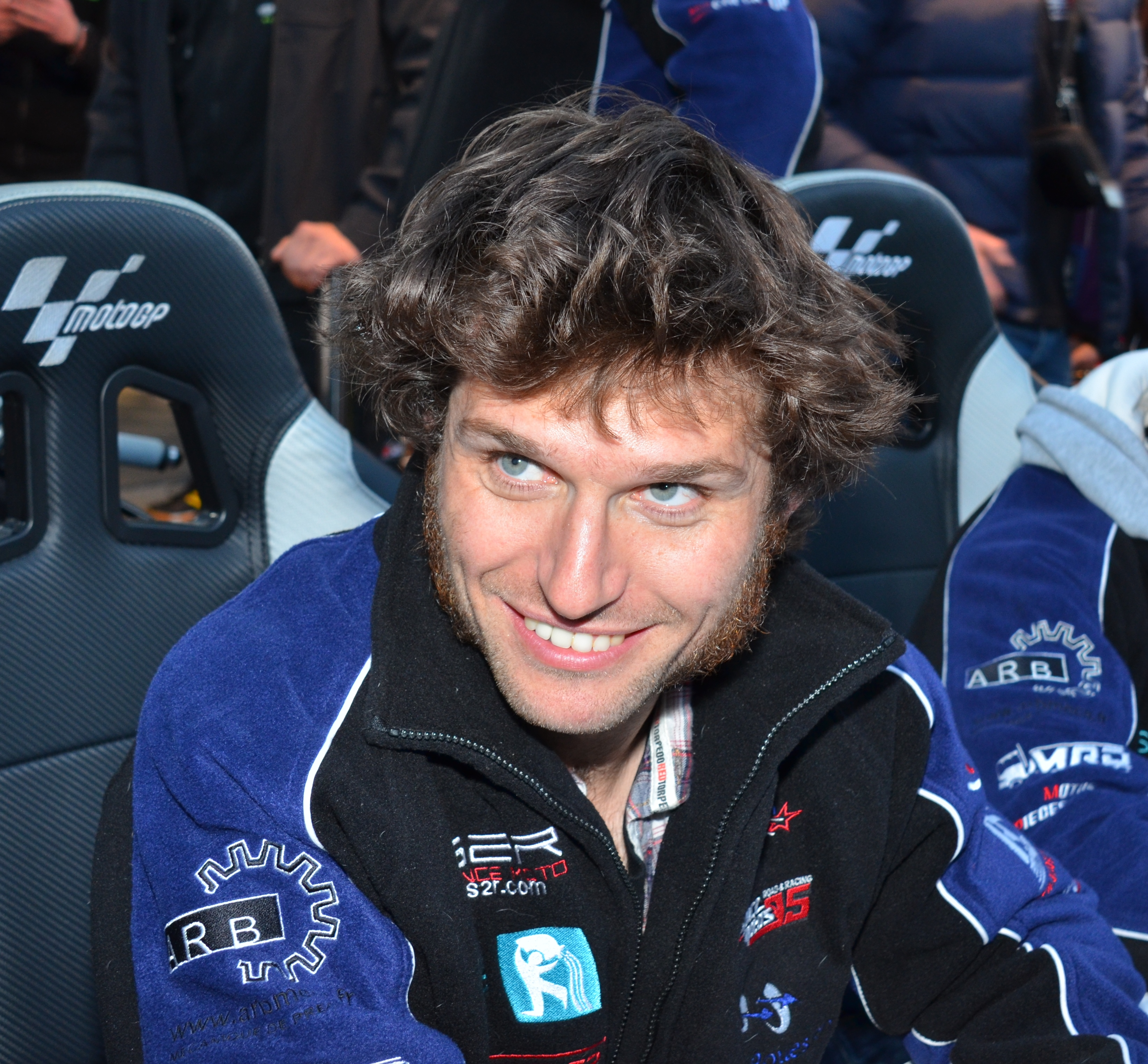
- Martin at the 2014 Bol d'Or
- Born: 4 November 1981 (age 45); Grimsby, Lincolnshire, England
Motorcycle racing career statistics
Isle of Man TT career
TTs contested	14 (2003–2015, 2017)
TT wins	0
TT podiums	17

Guy Martin (born 4 November 1981) is a British former motorcycle racer, heavy vehicle mechanic and television presenter. He retired from motorcycle racing in July 2017.

Martin started racing in 1998, and in 2004 competed on a road circuit for the first time at the Isle of Man TT. He has a total of 17 podium finishes at TT events. He broke his back twice in racing accidents, in the 2010 TT and the 2015 Ulster Grand Prix.

In August 2017, Martin joined Formula 1 car team Williams' pit-crew for the Belgian GP. Martin returned to road racing in May 2019 at the Tandragee 100 in Northern Ireland.

Martin starred in Closer to the Edge, a 2011 documentary on TT racing. He has since presented programmes on various engineering topics, as well as the Channel 4 series Speed with Guy Martin when he set speed records in a variety of human and engine powered vehicles. He has also written four books, and competed in mountain bike pedal-cycle races.

== Early life ==
Martin was born on 4 November 1981, in a suburb of Grimsby, Lincolnshire, England. He was named Guy in tribute to Guy Gibson of No. 617 Squadron RAF.

Martin's mother, Rita Kidals, was from Nettleton, Lincolnshire, near Caistor, and was of Latvian heritage; her father Walter (Waldemars) Kidals was a builder who had come to Britain in 1947 as a political refugee.. Martin's father, Ian, son of Jack, was also from Nettleton, and attended Yarborough Secondary School in the early 1960s. Jack had married Martin's grandmother, May, on 9 August 1945 at Nettleton church. May died in May 2002. Ian was a privateer motorbike racer who had competed in several Isle of Man TT events, but was forced to supplement his income with a job as a lorry mechanic, additionally selling bikes.

Martin has two sisters and a brother. His brother, Stuart, is also a truck mechanic and motorbike racer. His younger sister, Kate, was the first female mechanic in the BSB paddock. Martin and his siblings attended every Isle of Man TT from their births, until their father Ian crashed his Yamaha FZ750 whilst racing at Oliver's Mount, Scarborough in 1988, when Guy was aged seven. After recovering from the resulting broken hip, Martin's father did not race again, but worked as a mechanic in classic bike racing.

Martin attended Kirmington Church of England Primary School and The Vale Academy school, leaving at the age of 16.

== Career ==
=== Mechanic ===
Martin had shown an interest in working on trucks as early as age 12. As a child, he was fascinated by engines, and would take apart lawnmowers to try to make them go faster.

Post-school, Martin enrolled in North Lindsey College on a motor vehicle engineering course, but on recognising further education without pay was not for him, he secured an apprenticeship as a truck fitter with a Volvo centre, John Hebb Volvo. He also worked for his father, who at the time was self-employed, running a truck maintenance business. Filming commitments for The Boat that Guy Built led to him losing his job with his father, but Martin immediately went into town to apply for another truck job. He currently works for Moody International, a Scania centre in Grimsby. He only takes short periods off to race or do television work.

Martin also earns money by tuning fellow racers' bikes in the evenings, and takes casual work during TT race weeks. Eager to keep his options open, he has even acquired a tractor via a TV deal, using it on biomass farms for seasonal muck-spreading at night.

=== Racing ===
While completing his apprenticeship as a lorry mechanic, Martin raced motorbikes in his spare time. Martin returned to the Isle of Man at age 16. After overhearing lorry driver and amateur racer Baz Kirk discussing his plans to race in the 1997 Manx Grand Prix with his father, he was offered the chance to assist him as a race mechanic.

Martin decided to take up racing after a crash on public roads at the age of 18. He moved to Ireland to join Team Racing. In 2004 he moved to the Uel Duncan Racing team, staying with them until 2005. In 2006, Martin raced for Alistair Flanagan's AIM Yamaha race team, replacing John McGuinness. In the search for a more competitive team, Martin joined Hydrex Honda for the 2007 season.

The end of 2009 saw Martin leave Hydrex for Northern Ireland-based Wilson Craig Honda, but since November 2010, Martin has raced for TAS Racing (known as Relentless Suzuki, then Tyco Suzuki from 2012 to 2014, and Tyco BMW from 2015 to present), the team run by the Neill family also based in Northern Ireland, and with a long TT heritage. This switch to what was effectively a factory team meant the end of tuning his own equipment – at TAS, he would simply be riding pre-prepared machines.

Martin agreed a new deal for 2015 with TAS after the team signed a new equipment deal with BMW Motorrad, to ride the BMW S1000RR alongside William Dunlop. Martin was prepared to retire had TAS not chosen to switch to BMW, believing he had raced the Suzuki as hard as he could. With the new bike, he ran his fastest ever lap of the TT circuit in June 2015 – 132.398 mph (213.074 km/h) – just outside the outright lap record.

Martin suffered a serious crash in the Dundrod 150 Superbike event, part of the Ulster Grand Prix races in August 2015. Following the crash, Martin only got back on his racing motorbike in March 2016, for the filming of the F1 special for his Speed series.

Since 2011, Martin has also got into bicycle racing, in 24-hour events. For the 2016 season, Martin decided not to race in the TT for the first time in 11 years, opting instead for a mountain bike race. He was uncertain if the decision would lead him to retire from road racing, mountain bike racing, or if he would go on to do something else, but said "if I do race on the roads it will be with TAS".

Martin signed a new deal with Honda Racing on 18 January 2017 to ride the Honda CBR1000RR Fireblade SP2, rekindling his ambition to win the Isle of Man TT and renewing his focus on his road racing career.

=== Television ===
Martin first came to the attention of TV executives in 2009 when he appeared in an ITV4 programme intended primarily for fans of that year's TT race. The then film-producer, Andy Spellman, filmed with Martin at the TT. Spellman shot some additional test material of Martin back at home in the summer and the boss of North One Television showed the clips to a BBC executive.

Having engaged Andy Spellman as his advisor and agent in 2009, Martin worked with North One Television producers James Woodroffe and Ewan Keil, who he still works with to this day. Martin's first appearances on TV documentaries were on programmes based around his passion for engineering rather than his love of adrenaline sport – The Boat that Guy Built, airing on the BBC in 2011; and How Britain Worked, on Channel 4 in 2012. His thrill-seeking side later emerged with the production of the series Speed with Guy Martin, first airing on Channel 4 in 2013. Uncomfortable with presenting to camera or working from a script, his preferred style is to improvise his dialogue, and work by responding to questions from crew off camera.

Martin later turned down an invitation from Chris Evans to join the new presenting team of the BBC's motoring show, Top Gear.

=== Work ethic ===
Martin attributes his strong work ethic to his father's example. He has also retained his truck job in part due to the financial security it offered over racing. Describing it as "like an ingrained, default setting", he prioritises his mechanic job over other work, even cancelling complicated film shoots at short notice if needed. He also seeks out casual work as a way to switch off during TT events (practice only being in the evenings).

=== Writing ===
Martin has written three books about his life. Guy Martin: My Autobiography, published on 8 May 2014, reached No. 1 in the The Sunday Times bestseller list and remained there for at least six weeks, and eventually became the second best selling autobiography of 2014. This was followed by Guy Martin: When You’re Dead, You’re Dead, released on 22 October 2015, and covering the previous year in diary format, from the 24-hour Solo World Mountain Bike Championship to the Isle of Man TT. It was listed No. 1 in Amazon's sales figures for celebrity autobiographies in November 2015, with his main autobiography being No. 10. October 2016 saw the release of Guy Martin: Worms to Catch featuring Martin's thoughts on the past year and upcoming challenges. He has subsequently published further titles, We Need to Weaken the Mixture (2019) and Dead Men Don't Tell Tales (2022).

Martin is also listed as the author of companion books for some of his television shows: How Britain Worked, published on 4 October 2012 and Speed, published on 1 December 2013.

Martin also writes for the driving section of The Sunday Times. He has written reviews of the 2015 Aston Martin Vanquish Carbon, the 2015 Range Rover Sport SVR, the 2015 Ford Transit L2 H2, and the 2016 Ford Mustang V8 GT, as well as writing about his own Volvo Vöx and his Wall of Death show.

== Speed records ==
Martin has set the following speed records.

Record	Issuer	Speed	Location	Date	Previous holder	Ref.
Fastest speed on a gravity powered snow sled	Guinness World Records	134.368 km/h (83.492 mph)	Grandvalira, Andorra	10 January 2014	100.18 km/h (62.25 mph) (Rolf Allerdissen, 2010)	
Fastest speed in a soapbox	Guinness World Records	137.78 km/h (85.61 mph)	Mont Ventoux, France	16 October 2014		
Highest speed on a Wall of Death	Guinness World Records	125.77 km/h (78.15 mph)	Manby Airfield, England	28 March 2016	created for the attempt	
Fastest hovercraft	British record	121.04 km/h (75.21 mph)	Loch Ken, Scotland	8 October 2014		
Fastest tractor	Guinness World Records	217.568 km/h (135.190 mph)	Elvington Airfield, York, England	23 October 2019		

In July 2015, it was confirmed that Martin was to pilot Triumph Motorcycles' attempt on the motorcycle land speed record (World's Fastest Motorcycle), at the time standing at 376.363 mph (605 km/h), set by Rocky Robinson in 2010. The attempt was originally scheduled for August during the FIM event at Bonneville Salt Flats in the United States. Competing in the Division C (streamlined motorcycle) category, the Triumph Rocket Streamliner is 25.5 feet long, powered by two turbocharged, methanol fuelled, Triumph Rocket III engines, enclosed in a carbon Kevlar monocoque. A documentary about the attempt was made for Channel 4. His August 2015 crash at the Ulster GP caused the attempt to be postponed until September 2016.

Martin's quest to set a new two-wheeled world land speed record was called off due to conditions on the course. The attempt, on the purpose-built 400 mph motorcycle, suffered a number of setbacks at the track at the Bonneville Salt Flats.

The streamliner tipped over when it passed over a rut in the track as it was being towed to the start line. Triumph said rain meant it was not possible to create the required-consistency across the 11-mile course necessary to undertake the attempt. On 18 September 2016, Martin had hoped to complete a required 300 mph trial run before attempting to set a new world record.

A mile into the run the machine lost traction on the damp surface, veering off the steered path and tipping over on the course. Martin was confirmed to be "completely uninjured" and the record attempt was postponed once more.

== Motorcycle racing seasons ==
=== Early years ===
A successful debut year on the roads that saw Martin win the Cock o' the North and International Gold Cup races at Oliver's Mount, Scarborough as well as the Irish 750cc Support Championship.

=== 2006 season ===
The International road race meetings had mixed results: the North West 200 never went particularly well, The Isle of Man TT looked promising but problems soon led to it being another disappointment. At the final international of the year, the Ulster Grand Prix, he took four race wins and a second making him the Man of the Meeting.

Guy after winning the 2007 Ulster Grand Prix Supersport race

=== 2007 season ===
In the early season, Martin took part in British Superbike and Supersport rounds to prepare for the road racing season. The first major international of the year was the North West 200 in which he finished with an eighth, a fourth, two thirds and a second. In the CP Hire Superstock race after a bad start, Martin finished third. The Isle of Man TT was the next major race on the calendar and he got a third, two seconds and a DNF after running out of fuel with fewer than three miles to go until his first pit stop.

Martin continued to race on the English scene and he regained his Cock o' the North title at the Scarborough circuit before going to Ireland for the Kells Road Races in which he took one race win. This was preparation for the Ulster Grand Prix and in the first race Martin brought home a fifth position, in race two a win, and in the superbike race, which was shortened due to weather, a second. After this red flag, the day's racing was cancelled due to bad weather and that meant for the second year in a row Martin was the Man of the Meeting. The Scarborough Gold Cup meeting ended with him winning all the races on the final day including the Gold Cup and the second 600 race of the day after a good battle with John McGuinness and Ian Lougher, who were also both on the same Hondas as Martin.

=== 2008 season ===
As well as contesting a full season in the British Superbike Championship, in 2008 Martin again competed in the three International road races but was denied his first TT win when he broke down whilst leading the opening Superbike race. He was eleven seconds in the lead when an electrical problem forced him out on the fourth lap. He claimed a podium, third, in the Superstock race but suffered further retirements in the Senior and second Supersport races. In September 2008, it was back to Oliver's Mount for the International Gold Cup. Martin won the feature event and now has won six Gold Cups in a row, a new record, and also has the lap record for the 1000cc bikes at Scarborough with a time of 1:45.3.

=== 2009 season ===
In 2009, Martin contested all three Internationals as well as selected British Championship and Irish National races. In a move from previous seasons, Martin moved away from the main Hydrex team, preferring instead to run a smaller team and after a steady North West 200 meeting, confidence was high going into the TT, his number one event of the year, as he sought to win a race at the 37.73 mile circuit on the Isle of Man.

After claiming two seconds and a third on the Superstock, Superbike and Supersport bikes early in the week Martin's engine gave up after coming onto the pit lane in the second 600 race. When putting the bike into gear at the end of his second pit stop during the Senior race his chain snapped, meaning he ended up with another DNF.

Martin regrouped to claim the Southern 100 Championship on the Billown road course in July, after finishing second on no less than three occasions – 2005, 2006 and 2007 – before heading to the third International race of the season, the Ulster Grand Prix. After taking third in the Dundrod 150 Superbike race, Martin repeated the result in the feature UGP Superbike race, held over eight laps, but he ensured he would not be without an International win in 2009 when he won a second Superbike race, just over a tenth of a second in front of fellow Lincolnshire rider Gary Johnson. He also placed fourth and fifth in the equally close Superstock and Supersport races. At the 2009 Gold Cup at Oliver's Mount, Martin won the Steve Henshaw Gold Cup feature race, becoming the first rider to win seven consecutive meetings.

=== 2010 season ===
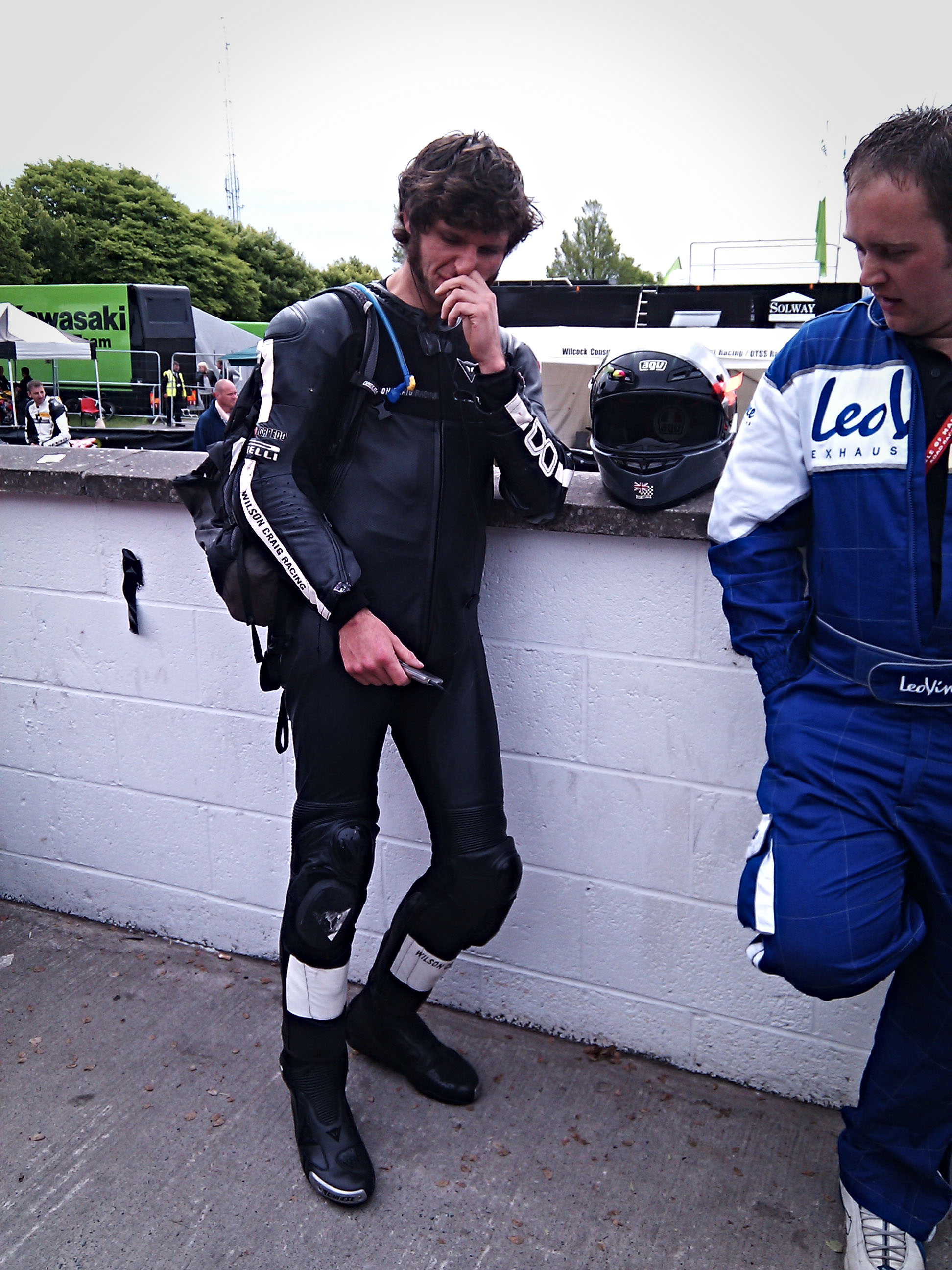
Martin at the 2010 Isle of Man TT

In 2010, Martin competed at the North West 200, with his best result being fourth in the second Superbike race. He went to the Isle of Man TT, looking to achieve his first TT victory. However, the meeting was dominated by Ian Hutchinson, who took a record-breaking five victories in all the solo races, and Martin suffered serious injuries in a major crash in the final race.

Prior to that crash, during the Superbike race, Martin received a 30-second penalty for exceeding the posted pit lane speed limit of 60 km/h by just 0.112 km/h.

Martin's performance at the TT was criticised by Simon Buckmaster, whose Performance Technical Racing built the bikes which Martin was running. He accused Martin of not listening to his race advice, arguing "He needs to stop being distracted and lift his professionalism. Instead of being a TV star and courting publicity 24x7, he should be concentrating on racing and what's needed to win. Get his focus and concentration into racing, not promoting his name and money-spinning deals." He also cited disrespectful behavior during the race and bad language and criticism directed toward a member of PTR in a magazine interview. Martin received considerable public support over both the nature and timing of Buckmaster's comments, coming as Martin was still recovering from the crash, but in a subsequent interview Buckmaster defended what he had said, arguing he was not slating him and stating Martin had no issue with the comments.

==== 2010 TT crash ====
In the final race, the Senior TT, Martin was a challenger to stop Hutchinson achieving the clean sweep, but was involved in an incident on the third lap of the race at Ballagarey, having led the race just before the first pit stop.

Recollecting the crash in 2012, Martin recounted how he has been pushing too hard going into the corner at 160–170 mph, having willingly crossed the line [which if you push beyond you might crash] in order to win. He recalled being thrown from the bike and accepting he was not going to survive the approaching high speed impact with a wall, attributing it to luck that he hit it at the right angle to get away with it.

Airlifted to Noble's Hospital in Douglas with chest injuries, Martin was later diagnosed as suffering bruising to both lungs and minor fractures to his upper spine.

==== 2011 Ulster GP ====
A superbike race 2 win at the Ulster Grand Prix followed for Martin after his consistent TT. He finished second in the opening superbike race behind Bruce Anstey on the Padgetts racing Honda Fireblade.

=== 2012 season ===
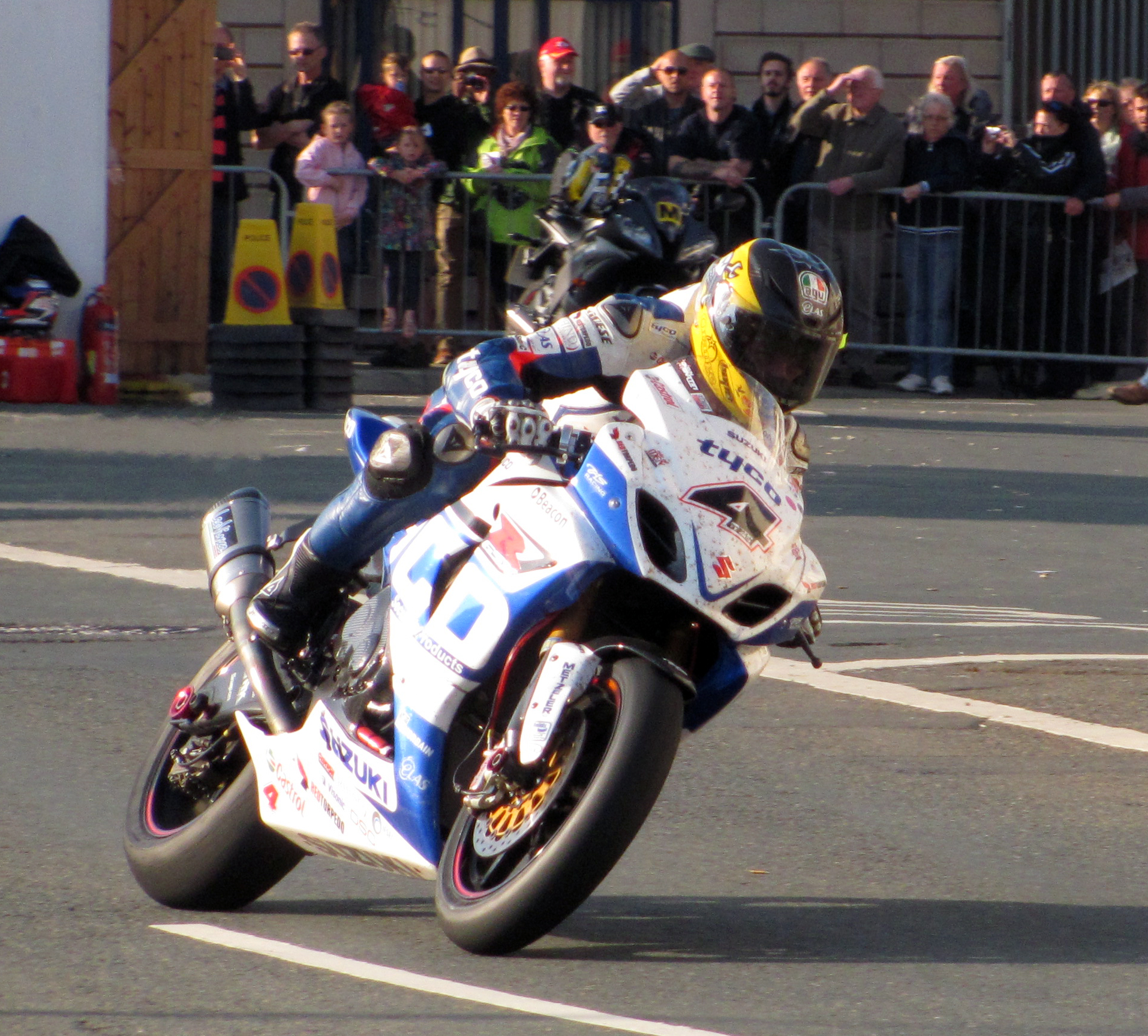
Martin at the 2013 Isle of Man TT

Martin made his first 2012 appearance at the Cookstown 100 meeting in preparation for the North West 200 and Isle of Man TT. Martin brought his race season to a close winning five races at Scarborough's Oliver Mount Gold Cup. He also took part in the Ryan Farquhar Parade lap on one of Ryan's own KMR Kawasaki's.

==== 2012 North West 200 ====
Following on from the Cookstown meeting, Martin was set to campaign in all the main races at the North West 200, as a prelude to working up for the Isle of Man TT. However, during the Supersport race he crashed. As a consequence, he was left with a suspected head injury, which resulted in his team manager, Philip Neill, withdrawing Martin from the remainder of the racing programme.

This led to rumours of a "bust-up" with the Suzuki Team, and resulted in Martin's team boss, Hector Neill, being interviewed on Manx Radio TT 365 prior to the TT, during which Neill scotched such rumours as: "Media inspired skulduggery. Paddock tittle-tattle and unfounded hear-say".

==== 2012 TT ====
Martin's start to the 2012 TT Festival saw him competing – in a private capacity – at the Pre-TT Classic races at the Billown Circuit, Castletown. Martin was lucky to escape injury while competing in the superbike race, and was battling for the lead of the race on a Suzuki XR69 with Jamie Coward, when he crashed on the final lap.

Martin made a good start to the Superbike TT, and at the end of the first lap he was lying in third place behind John McGuinness and Cameron Donald. He continued to hold station during the following three laps, but a problem during his final pit stop at the end of lap four, resulted in the team being unable to replace his rear tyre. As a consequence of diminishing grip from a fading tyre, Martin was overtaken on corrected time by Bruce Anstey by the end of lap five, although he did hold on to finish fourth with a time of 1hr.47.20 at an average speed of 126.54 mph. This was followed by fifth place in the Superstock race, a retirement in the first Supersport race and eighth place in the second Supersport outing.

=== 2013 season ===
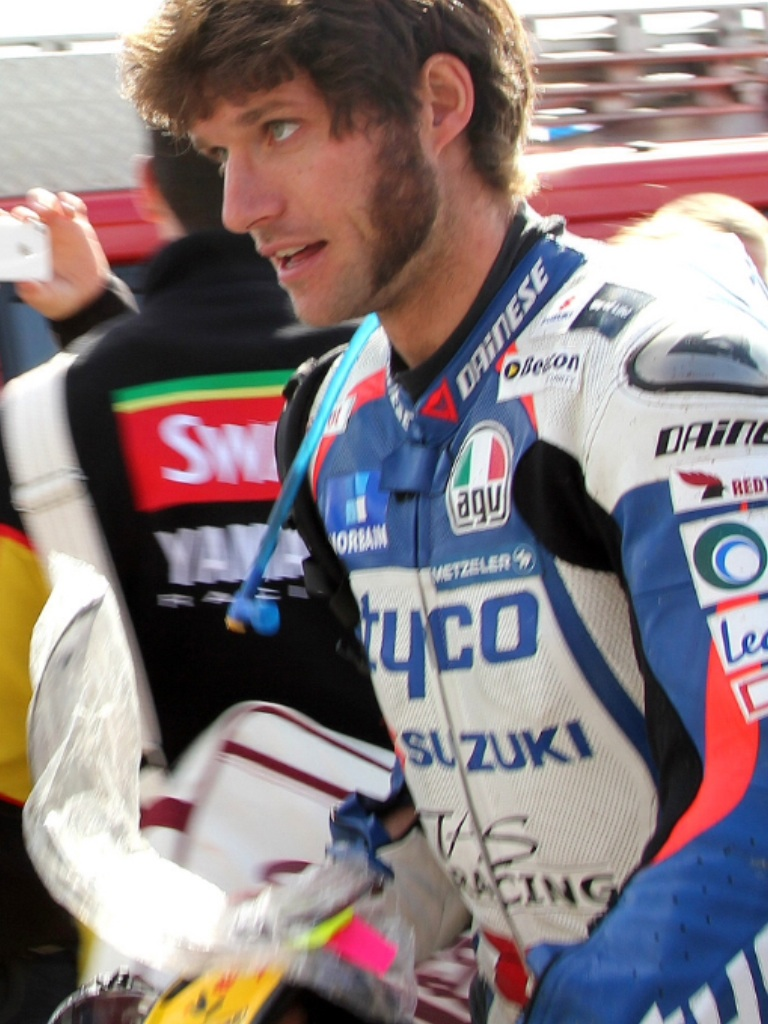
Martin at the 2013 Isle of Man TT

==== 2013 Ulster Grand Prix ====
The 2013 Ulster Grand Prix was Martin's most successful campaign at the event, and which saw him secure a hat trick of victories at the meeting winning the Supersport 1, UGP Superbike and Superbike categories.

=== 2015 season ===
Martin joined his teammates in early March 2015, for pre-season testing. This initially took the form of a four-day test programme at Cartagena and following this the squad deployed to the BMW Motorrad test camp at Almeria in Spain for the next three days.

==== 2015 early season ====
Martin opened his 2015 season at the Oliver's Mount Circuit on Saturday 11 April, at which he recorded a maiden victory on his BMW S1000RR Superstock at the Scarborough venue. Finishing fourth the following day in treacherous conditions, Martin went on to lift the main prize of the meeting, the Spring Cup.

Following their success at Scarborough, the Tyco Team headed to the opening event in the Irish Racing Calendar, the Cookstown 100. Martin continued his fine early season form by winning the opening Royal Hotel Superbike Race, and then sealing a brace of superbike wins at the feature race, the KDM Cookstown 100, again accomplished on Superstock machinery.

==== 2015 Northwest 200 ====
Martin was introduced to his factory BMW S1000RR Superbike during a day's testing at Kirkistown on 7 May, in preparation for the team's campaign at the Vauxhall International North West 200 for the opening practice session on 12 May. Martin's arrival at the triangle circuit generated the usual media interest, however the attention continued following some controversial comments concerning the circuit by Martin. On return from a practice lap on his Supersport machine, Martin was briefly interviewed by BBC Sport presenter Stephen Watson. Struggling to qualify, Martin said he was "bored" riding the course, citing the number of chicanes which had been introduced in an effort to improve safety. As on previous occasions this resulted in Martin's team boss, Hector Neill, again having to rally to his rider's defence. Interviewed by the BBC and other assorted media Neill downplayed the comments, merely alluding to the fact that Martin was becoming concerned that the course was starting to resemble more a purpose-built racing track as opposed to a pure road circuit. This brought reaction from various commentators and competitors, with Philip McCallen questioning Martin's commitment to the sport as well as his indiscreet criticism of the course.

In a further interview with BBC Sport, again conducted by Watson and with event director Mervyn Whyte in attendance, Martin apologized for his comments and whilst he was supportive of the event, describing it as a "mega event," he continued that he was not too stuck on the circuit, and that he simply didn't like chicanes. Watson drew Martin's attention to the fact that the comments by this time had been seen by over 300,000 people on Facebook. Martin made light of the situation, stating that he was "caught in the heat of the moment, and simply let rip." He then questioned why he was generating such attention for his comments, when the main attention should not have been directed towards him but rather directed towards the racing, and to the fact that Alastair Seeley had qualified on pole position and had subsequently gone on to win the opening race.

The 2015 Vauxhall International North West 200 was blighted by a series of incidents resulting in races being red flagged. Martin did not make an impression in any of the races, and failed to finish in the top six.

==== 2015 TT ====
Martin's 2015 Isle of Man TT provided mixed results. Opening his account with a retirement in the Superbike Race, he followed this up by taking a respectable 5th place astride the Smiths Triumph in the opening Supersport TT. Switching back to his BMW S1000RR Superstock machine, Martin came home in seventh place in the Superstock TT. Brought in as a late replacement for the injured William Dunlop in the TT Zero Race, and with negligible practice time, Martin took his electrically powered Victory Racing machine to fourth place in his first participation in the class. He then secured his only podium place of the meeting, again on board the Smiths Triumph Daytona, when he claimed third place in the second Supersport outing. Martin rounded off his 2015 campaign when he took the factory BMW S1000RR Superbike to fourth place in the Senior TT with an average race speed of 129.602 mph (208.574 km/h), but with a fastest lap average of 132.398 mph (213.074 km/h), a personal best for Martin and just two seconds slower than race winner and outright lap record holder John McGuinness.

==== 2015 Southern 100 ====
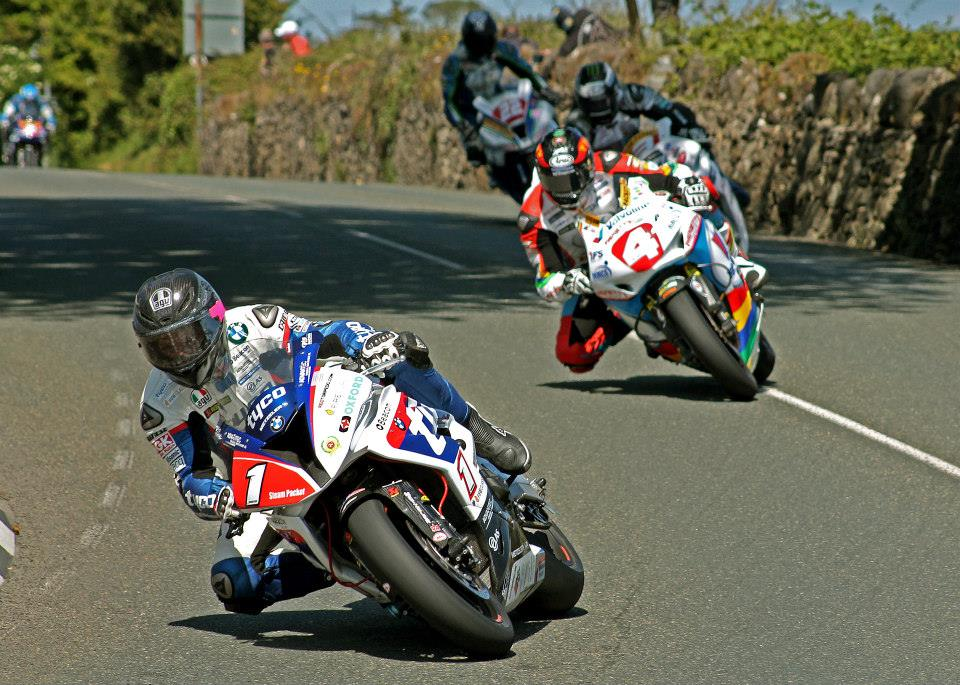
Guy Martin leads Dan Kneen and Michael Dunlop into Church Bends during the 2015 Diamond Jubilee Southern 100

Martin arrived back on the Isle of Man in July in order to compete in the Southern 100 Races which were celebrating their Diamond Jubilee. Poor weather initially hampered the racing programme with the Corlett's Trophies 1000/600 cc race red flagged in wet conditions. The race was re-run two days later, with Dan Kneen taking the lead for the opening two laps. However, Martin edged him out, taking the lead on lap 3 and thereafter dicing for the lead with Kneen and Michael Dunlop. Leading at Stadium Corner on the final circuit, Martin looked favourite to take the honours. However, getting maximum drive out of the final corner, Dunlop snatched victory at the line by 0.087 seconds.

Martin then began to take hold of the meeting. On board his BMW S1000RR Martin took to the grid for the finale to the event, the Southern 100 Solo Championship. Pushed hard during the nine-lap race by Dan Kneen, Martin led the pack by the end of the opening lap and continued to hold station at the end of lap 2. Lap 3 saw Martin maintain his lead, however Dunlop low sided at Ballabeg Hairpin putting him out of the race. The ensuing melee enabled Martin and Kneen to break free from the chasing pack and their two-way battle ensued into the following lap. As the race went into the final two laps, the rear echelon of the field started to have an effect on the front running riders, with Kneen being held up in an overtaking manoeuvre at Iron Gate. This enabled Martin to stay clear on the final circuit taking the Southern 100 title for the third year in succession.

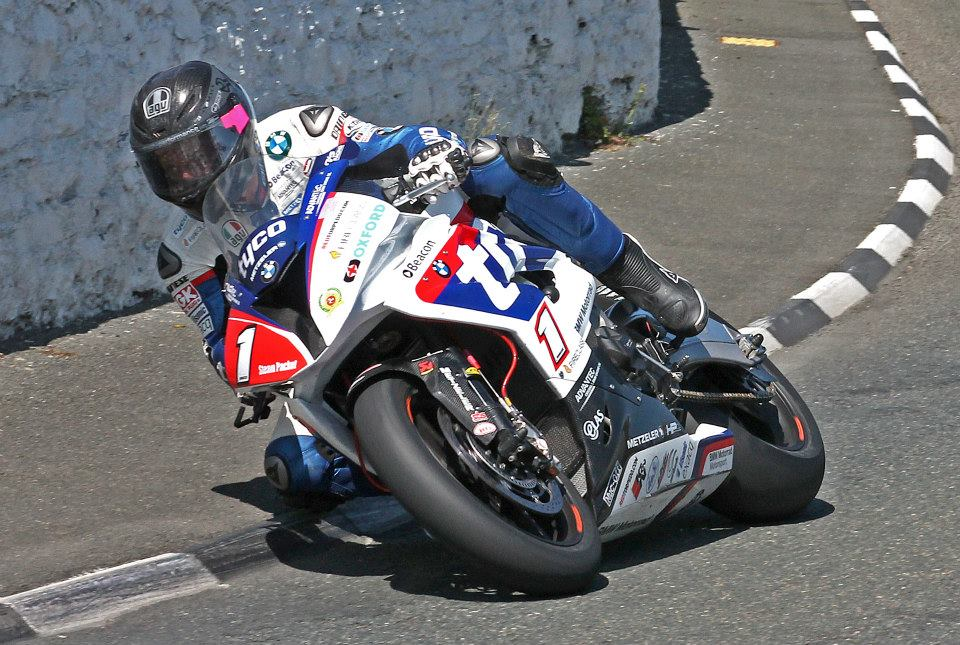
Martin at Church Bends during the 2015 Southern 100.

Following his victory, Martin joined the late Joey Dunlop as the only riders to have won the Southern 100 Solo Championship Race for three years in succession.

==== 2015 Ulster GP crash ====
Martin crashed at high speed when leading the 2015 Dundrod 150 Superbike race (part of the Ulster GP) in August. On the final lap, being pursued by Bruce Anstey, he left the course at Ireland's Corner, fracturing thoracic vertebrae, his sternum and a number of ribs and his throttle hand, requiring steel rods to be inserted into his back and a pin in his hand. He signed himself out of hospital four days later.

=== 2016 season ===
In January 2016, Martin confirmed he would not be racing the 2016 Isle of Man TT as it clashed with a mountain bike race he wanted to compete in, and he would also not be racing the prior North West 200 due to the mountain bike training.

Martin did not participate at the Southern 100 motorcycle races, following his participation in the Tour Divide.

=== 2017 season ===
Martin announced on 18 January that he had signed for the Honda Racing, based in Louth, Lincolnshire, and would compete alongside teammate John McGuinness at various national and international meetings including the North West 200 and Isle of Man TT Races.

In addition, it was confirmed on 20 March that Martin would compete at the 2017 Tandragee 100 and the Cookstown 100 events.

==== Tandragee 100 ====
Martin's first competitive appearance since 2015 was his debut for Honda at the Tandragee 100 on 22 April, riding the new Honda Fireblade Superstock-class machine. During the first lap of the Open Superbike race, Martin was involved in a collision with another rider at Marlacoo corner. Both were unhurt, but retired from the race. Due to an incident involving an Italian rider and poor weather conditions, the rest of the meeting was cancelled.

==== Spring Cup ====
After the Tandragee races, Martin travelled overnight to make the start at Oliver's Mount for the annual Spring Cup races.

In the Senior class, Martin finished 12th with Dean Harrison finishing in first.

Reference: Bob Smith Spring Cup 2017 Results

==== Cookstown 100 ====
Martin's next outing of the season was on the Superstock Fireblade SP2 at the Cookstown 100, additionally riding for the Wilson Craig Team in the Supersport class. After practice, Martin was qualified fifth fastest in the Supersport, but failed to start in the race. Martin took the big Honda to fifth place in the first Superbike Race, however he again failed to start in the second race.

==== North West 200 ====
As at the Cookstown 100, it was confirmed Martin would ride for both the factory-supported Honda team, and in the Supersport 600 cc class for the Wilson Craig Team. Interviewed by BBC Sport, Martin said he hadn't pushed the machine too hard, and was quite happy with a "steady ride round." Martin's criticism of the course in regard to the chicanes was mentioned. When queried on a previous statement made after the 2015 meeting that he would not return to the triangle circuit, Martin commented that the primary reason was to get the necessary race-time to enter the Isle of Man TT Races. He also confirmed that he enjoyed riding at the Northwest 200 and that he had development work to do with the new Honda. When queried why he did not renew his association with the Irish Tyco BMW Team, Martin stated that after the 2015 accident, he had decided to retire from racing but still had respect for Tyco BMW, concluding during the Tour Divide cycle race that he no longer had passion for racing. A reason Martin gave for signing for Honda, was that he could fulfill an ambition, as Honda had promised him he could race a vintage Honda RC181.

Practice produced mixed results for Martin. Following an accident in practice injuring teammate John McGuinness at Primrose Hill on 11 May, a decision was made by Honda Racing to withdraw Martin from that evening's Superstock race. Honda Racing, after further appraisal of the incident involving McGuinness, also withdrew from the remaining events.

On the Wilson Craig Honda 600, Martin qualified 16th fastest during first practice for the Supersport race, recording a fastest lap of 109.614 mph (176.407 km/h), slipping to 27th fastest in the second qualifying period, which led to Martin starting the race from the ninth row on the grid, bringing his machine home in 23rd place.

==== Isle of Man TT ====
Following the North West 200 incident involving John McGuinness riding the new Honda SP2, tests were carried out by the Honda Racing Team prior to the bike arriving at the TT races. The 2017 Isle of Man TT qualifying week was disrupted by poor weather and Martin had little track time. The weather improved towards the end of the week, enabling a full practice session to take place on Friday 2 June. Due to the lack of practice, the first race day was postponed with the time allotted to additional practice. On 3 June, in ideal conditions, Martin completed four practice laps recording the 26th fastest time, around the road course of 37.73 miles (60.72 km) in a time of 18 minutes 11.69 seconds at an average speed of 124.403 mph (200.207 km/h).

The opening race, the Superbike TT, was rescheduled for Sunday 4 June but Martin only got 8 miles (13 km) into the race before he crashed at Doran's Bend. In an interview afterwards, Martin stated that as he attempted to change down the gearbox after Ballig Bridge in order to negotiate the 4th gear left handed Doran's Bend, he hit a false neutral. Martin was unable to offer an opinion as to whether the bike would be safe to ride in the Senior TT, merely describing the SP2 as a "Jonah". Despite crashing at around 135 mph (217 km/h), Martin only sustained a bruised wrist. Following his spill in the opening race, Martin also failed to start in both the Supersport race and the Superstock event.

==== Southern 100 ====
At the start of the season, Martin confirmed his intention to compete at the 2017 Southern 100 races on the Isle of Man. However, following the problems with the Honda CBR1000RR SP2 at the TT races, Martin decided not to participate at the event.

==== Ulster Grand Prix ====
On 21 July 2017, Honda Racing, an English company based in Louth, Lincolnshire also known as Honda Racing CBR, issued a statement to the effect that Guy Martin would not be competing at the 2017 Ulster Grand Prix; the decision was described by an event organiser as "Naturally I'm disappointed...but it's not altogether surprising given the difficulties the team has experienced throughout the season".

== Retirement from motorcycle racing ==
On 26 July 2017, it was officially announced that Martin had retired from motorcycle racing. In an exclusive interview with the Motorcycle News Martin said:

Racing's been good to me, but I'm bored of it. You spend the early part of the year preparing for the season – testing, racing, talking about it, and then doing it all over again. It's like Groundhog Day. It's time to stop.

Martin returned to road racing in May 2019 at Tandragee, winning the 1000 cc class on a BSA Rocket, finishing second on the road to outright winner Dean Stimpson on a 500 cc machine with both classes run together. He had provisionally entered the earlier Cookstown event but failed to appear.

== Race results ==
=== Isle of Man TT ===
==== 2009 ====
Race	Position	Time	Speed	Replica
Superbike	3rd	01:46:59.69	126.948	Silver
Supersport Race 1	2nd	01:13:03.39	123.948	Silver
Superstock	2nd	01:11:06.31	127.349	Silver
Supersport Race 2	DNF	DNF	DNF	DNF
Senior	DNF	DNF	DNF	DNF

==== 2010 ====
Race	Position	Time	Speed	Replica
Superbike	4th	1:47:18.05	126.586	Silver
Supersport Race 1	2nd	1:12:40.78	124.591	Silver
Superstock	5th	1:11:50.06	126.057	Silver
Supersport Race 2	4th	1:13:00.31	124.035	Silver
Senior	DNF	DNF	DNF	DNF

==== 2011 ====
Race	Position	Time	Speed	Replica
Superbike	DNF	DNF	DNF	DNF
Supersport Race 1	3rd	0:54:56:06	123.628	Silver
Superstock	3rd	1:11:36.59	126.452	Silver
Supersport Race 2	3rd	1:13:29.28	123.220	Silver
Senior	2nd	1:45:53:00	128.281	Silver

==== 2012 ====
Race	Position	Time (HH:MM:SS)	Speed (Mph)	Replica
Superbike	4th	01:47:20.18	126.544	Silver
Superstock Race	5th	01:12:06.85	125.567	Silver
Supersport Race 1	DNF	DNF	DNF	DNF
Supersport Race 2	8th	01:15:17.95	120.256	Silver
Senior	Race Cancelled			

==== 2013 ====
Race	Position	Time (HH:MM:SS)	Speed (Mph)	Replica
Superbike	4th	01:46:58.894	126.964	Silver
Superstock Race	DNF	DNF	DNF	DNF
Supersport Race 1	6th	01:13:17.846	123.540	Silver
Supersport Race 2	8th	01:14:07.563	122.159	Silver
Senior	5th	01:46:14.371	127.851	Silver

==== 2014 ====
Race	Position	Time (HH:MM:SS)	Speed (Mph)	Replica
Superbike	2nd	01:46:06.954	128.000	Silver
Supersport Race 1	6th	01:13:44.591	122.794	Silver
Superstock	DNF	DNF	DNF	DNF
Supersport Race 2	10th	01:14:30.161	121.542	Silver
Senior	3rd	01:45:56.962	128.201	Silver

==== 2015 ====
Race	Position	Time (HH:MM:SS)	Speed (Mph)	Replica
Superbike	DNF	DNF	DNF	DNF
Supersport Race 1	5th	01:12:58.110	124.097	Silver
Superstock	7th	01:11:10.217	127.233	Silver
TT Zero	4th	20:37.287	109.717	Silver
Supersport Race 2	3rd	01:12:30.775	124.877	Silver
Senior	4th	01:09:52.148	129.602	Silver

==== 2017 ====
Race	Position	Time (HH:MM:SS)	Speed (Mph)	Replica
Superbike	DNF	DNF	DNF	DNF
Supersport Race 1	DNS	DNS	DNS	DNS
Superstock	DNS	DNS	DNS	DNS
TT Zero	2nd			
Senior	DNS	DNS	DNS	DNS

=== Southern 100 ===
==== 2015 ====
Race	Position	Time	Speed
Corlett's Trophies 600/1000cc	2nd	16:06.033	110.866 mph
Ellan Vannin Fuels Senior Race	1st	16:17.148	109.605 mph
Manx Gas Southern 100 Solo Championship Race	1st	20:32.654	111.710 mph

== Career statistics ==
=== British Superbike Championship ===
==== By year ====
(key) (Races in bold indicate pole position; races in italics indicate fastest lap)

Year	Make	1			2			3			4			5			6			7			8			9			10			11			12			Pos	Pts
Year	Make	R1	R2	R3	R1	R2	R3	R1	R2	R3	R1	R2	R3	R1	R2	R3	R1	R2	R3	R1	R2	R3	R1	R2	R3	R1	R2	R3	R1	R2	R3	R1	R2	R3	R1	R2	R3	Pos	Pts
2008	Honda	THR; 15	THR; 9		OUL; 12	OUL; Ret		BHGP; 13	BHGP; 12		DON	DON		SNE; Ret	SNE; Ret		MAL; 16	MAL; 17		OUL; Ret	OUL; 18		KNO; Ret	KNO; 14		CAD; 15	CAD; 11		CRO; 18	CRO; Ret		SIL; Ret	SIL; Ret		BHI; 16	BHI; 15		18th	28
2010	Honda	BHI	BHI		THR; DNS	THR; DNS		OUL; Ret	OUL; 20		CAD	CAD		MAL	MAL		KNO	KNO		SNE	SNE	SNE	BHGP	BHGP	BHGP	CAD	CAD		CRO	CRO		SIL	SIL		OUL	OUL	OUL	NC	0
2011	Suzuki	BHI; 16	BHI; Ret		OUL	OUL		CRO	CRO		THR	THR		KNO	KNO		SNE	SNE		OUL	OUL; C		BHGP	BHGP	BHGP	CAD	CAD	CAD	DON	DON		SIL	SIL		BHGP	BHGP	BHGP	38th	0

=== British Supersport Championship ===
(key) (Races in bold indicate pole position; races in italics indicate fastest lap)

Year	Bike	1	2	3	4	5	6	7	8	9	10	11	12	Pos	Pts
2009	Honda	BHI; Ret	OUL; Ret	DON	THR	SNE	KNO	MAL	BHGP	CAD	CRO	SIL	OUL	NC	0
2010	Honda	BHI	THR; 12	OUL	CAD	MAL	KNO	SNE	BHGP; Ret	CAD; 13	CRO	SIL	OUL	28th	7

Year	Bike	1	2	3	4	5	6	7	8	9	10	11	12	13	14	15	16	17	18	19	20	21	22	23	24	Pos	Pts
2015	Triumph	DON; 16	DON; 17	BRH	BRH	OUL	OUL	SNE	SNE	KNO	KNO	BRH	BRH	THR	THR	CAD	CAD	OUL	OUL	ASS	ASS	SIL	SIL	BRH	BRH	NC	0

== Mountain bike racing and pedal cars ==
Martin has successfully raced mountain bikes in cross country, downhill races and endurance races. In June 2011, after two years of training, he raced in the Salzkammergut Trophy in Austria. With a time of 14 hours 40 minutes, he was the first British non-professional rider to finish. He achieved his goal of a podium-finish during a 2013 British Championship event in Fort William, Scotland.

Martin placed second in the male solo rider category at the Strathpuffer 24-hour mountain bike race (held at Strathpeffer, Scotland) in both 2014 and 2015.

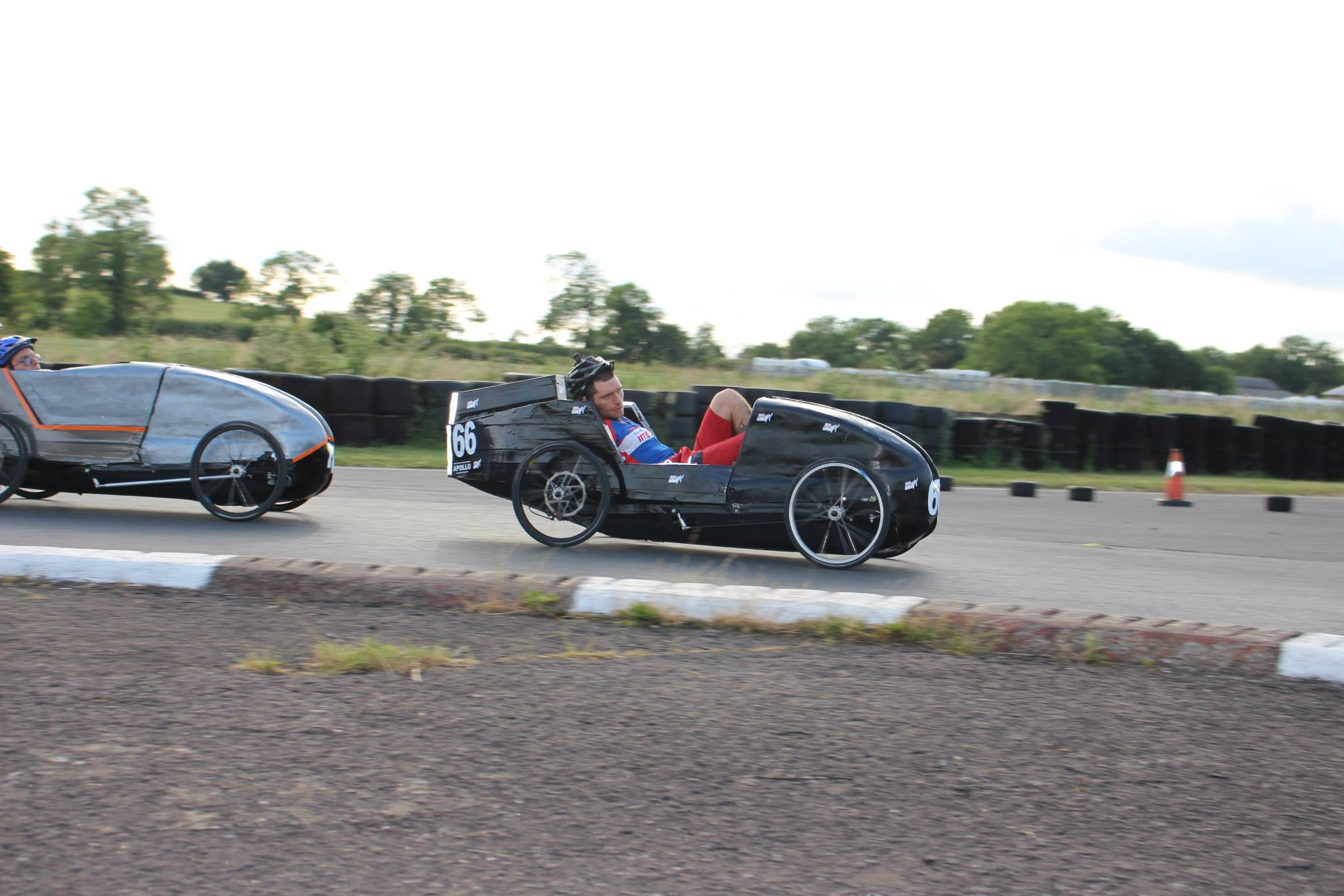
Martin racing an Apollo racing pedal car at Shenington

Martin achieved an ambition and competed in the 2016 Tour Divide mountain bike race, which runs from Banff, Canada to Antelope Wells, New Mexico, negotiating the Rocky Mountains, beginning on 11 June. He completed the course, taking 18 days, six hours and 23 minutes, with an average of 240 km (150 mi) a day.

Martin also competed as part of a Pedal Car Racing team in the 24-hour, 2015 British Pedal Car Championship event at the Shenington Kart circuit on 27/28 June, as part of the Team JMC/Hope Factory Racing Team.

Martin also competed in the 2019 Arizona trail race (AZTR), however he struggled to finish and he said " I was looking for something to break me, and this did". He averaged 25–30 mi (40–50 km) a day which showed how much he struggled compared to the tour divide's 150

== Film and television ==
=== Filmography ===
programme	genre	episodes	subject	original broadcast		
programme	genre	episodes	subject	from	to	channel
The Boat that Guy Built	documentary (TV)	6	maritime (narrowboat Reckless)	2 March 2011	6 April 2011	BBC One
Russell Howards Good News	Comedy Stand Up	Season 6 Episode 6	News Clip	2012 single episode		BBC Three
TT3D Closer to the Edge	documentary (film)	n/a	The 2010 Isle of Man TT			
How Britain Worked	documentary (TV)	6 (1 series)	The Industrial Revolution	21 October 2012	25 November 2012	Channel 4
Speed with Guy Martin	documentary (TV)	14 (3 series of 4 episodes, plus two Formula 1 specials)	vehicular speed record attempts	29 December 2013	9 October 2016	Channel 4
Guy Martin's Spitfire	documentary (TV)	1	aviation (Supermarine Spitfire Mk.Ia registration N3200)	12 October 2014	n/a	Channel 4
Guy Martin's Passion for Life	documentary (TV)	1	autobiographical	27 December 2014	n/a	Channel 4
Our Guy In India	documentary (TV)	2	travelogue (journey on a Royal Enfield (India) motorcycle)	1 February 2015	8 February 2015	Channel 4
Guy Martin: Last Flight of the Vulcan Bomber	documentary (TV)	1	military aviation (Avro Vulcan XH558 jet bomber)	29 November 2015	n/a	Channel 4
Our Guy in Latvia	documentary (TV)	1	autobiographical	14 December 2015	n/a	Channel 4
Guy Martin's Wall of Death: Live	documentary (TV)	1	Wall of Death	28 March 2016	n/a	Channel 4
Our Guy in China	documentary (TV)	3	exploring China and record-attempt crossing of the Taklamakan Desert	21 November 2016	5 December 2016	Channel 4
Guy Martin's WWI Tank	documentary (TV)	1	participating in creating a working replica of WWI Mark IV tank now on display at the Norfolk Tank Museum	19 November 2017	n/a	Channel 4
Guy Martin vs the Robot Car	documentary (TV)	1	investigates autonomous vehicles	26 November 2017	n/a	Channel 4
Our Guy in Russia	documentary (TV)	3	exploring Russia and visiting Chernobyl	16 July 2018	30 July 2018	Channel 4
Guy Martin: The World's Fastest Van?	documentary (TV)	1	Martin rebuilds his transit van and tries to break the van lap record at the Nürburgring in Germany	4 November 2018	n/a	Channel 4
Guy Martin's D-Day Landing	documentary (TV)	1	Martin restores a Douglas C-47 Skytrain, and trains with the Red Devils	2 June 2019	n/a	Channel 4
Our Guy in Japan	documentary (TV)	2	exploring Japan	24 November 2019	1 December 2019	Channel 4
Guy Martin: World's Fastest Tractor	documentary (TV)	1	Martin attempts to build the worlds' fastest tractor and set a speed record of over 100 mph	17 November 2019	n/a	Channel 4
Guy Martin's Great Escape	documentary (TV)	1	recreating the iconic scene from the movie with the same name	8 December 2019	n/a	Channel 4
Guy Martin's Best Bits	documentary (TV)	4	Martin looks back at some of his greatest achievements	10 October 2020	31 October 2020	Channel 4
Guy Martin's Battle of Britain	documentary (TV)	2	Martin trains as a Second World War fighter pilot	18 April 2021	25 April 2021	Channel 4
Guy Martin: The World's Fastest Electric Car?	documentary (TV)	1	Martin attempts to set a new world record for the fastest road-legal battery vehicle	9 August 2021	n/a	Channel 4
Guy's Garage	documentary (TV)	4	Martin transforms some of Europe's most iconic road vehicles into extreme racing machines	22 November 2021	n/a	Channel 4
Guy Martin's Lancaster Bomber	documentary (TV)	1	Martin pays homage to the World War II bomber and explores if he has the capability to become a Lancaster crewman	19 December 2021	n/a	Channel 4
Guy Martin's Great British Power Trip	documentary (TV)	3	with rising energy costs, Martin investigates how Britain's power is made, including how the industry is moving away from fossil fuel to sustainable energy	5 February 2023	19 February 2023	Channel 4
Our Guy In Colombia	documentary (TV)	2	Martin travels to Colombia to see, first-hand the effect cocaine is having on the country	23 July 2023	30 July 2023	Channel 4
Guy Martin’s Lost WW2 Bomber	documentary (TV)	1	Martin helps recover Lancaster ED603, a crashed Second World War bomber shot down over the Netherlands	7 July 2024	n/a	Channel 4
Guy Martin: Top Gun	documentary (TV)	1	Martin trains to fly a classic frontline fighter jet: a De Havilland Vampire	24 August 2024	n/a	Channel 4
Guy Martin: Arctic Warrior	documentary (TV)	2	Martin travels to Camp Viking in northern Norway to experience arctic warfare training with the Royal Marines Commandos	11 December 2024	12 December 2024	Channel 4
Guy Martin’s Proper Jobs	documentary series (TV)	8	U&Dave reality series. Third series commissioned.	26 January 2025	Present	U&Dave
Our Guy in Vietnam	documentary series (TV)	2	On 50th anniversary of the end of the Vietnam War, Guy Martin travels across Vietnam, seeing legacies of the conflict and how the country is developing.	1 June 2025	8 June 2025	Channel 4
Guy Martin: The British Train that Changed the World	documentary (TV)	1	To mark the 200th anniversary of the first ever passenger rail journey, Guy Martin helps to rebuild a replica of George Stephenson's Locomotion No. 1.	26 October 2025	n/a	Channel 4
Guy Martin's House Without Bills	documentary (TV)	1	Martin investigates how to make homes more energy efficient.	9 February 2026	n/a	Channel 4

=== Engineering ===
==== The Boat that Guy Built ====
This six-part series sees Martin and his friend, Mark 'Mavis' Davies, renovate a narrowboat, called Reckless, while travelling on the canal network using the inventions of the Industrial Revolution. The programme includes reconstructions of early industrial processes such as smelting iron.

==== How Britain Worked ====
This six-part series examined some of the important engineering advances at the time of the Industrial Revolution. Feeling the country had lost its reputation as the workshop of the world and "went soft" under the auspices of health and safety culture, through replicating original working methods in various practical projects, the series was to highlight the ordinary workers who were experiencing long hours while working to remarkable precision, "within a couple of thousandths of an inch".

Episode list
Episode	Title	Original broadcast
1	Severn Valley Railway	21 October 2012
2	Yorkshire Saw Mill	28 October 2012
3	Victorian Seaside Resort	4 November 2012
4	Newcomen Beam Engine	13 November 2012
5	Brixham Sailing Trawler	18 November 2012
6	Birmingham Botanical Gardens (United Kingdom)	25 November 2012

===== Severn Valley Railway =====
In this episode, Martin helps to overhaul and later drives a steam locomotive on the Severn Valley Railway, Shropshire, in the process working on its boiler, safety valves and a wheel. Using Victorian methods, he also lays some track, forges a coal shovel out of wrought iron, and repairs a 100-year-old train driver's pocket watch.

===== Yorkshire Saw Mill =====
In this episode, Martin helps to repair the world's oldest surviving water turbine used to power Gayle Mill, a saw mill in Wensleydale, North Yorkshire. Felling a tree by hand, he transports the lumber to the mill by steam traction engine, to build a replica of the first pedal-powered bicycles. Also covered is the migration of farm workers to city factories, displaced by mechanisation.

===== Victorian Seaside Resort =====
In this episode, Martin helps with winter maintenance on attractions in the Welsh resort of Llandudno, working on the pier, a helter-skelter ride, and the Great Orme Tramway. He also participates in a promenade concert, and covers the Victorian craze of sea bathing.

===== Newcomen Beam Engine =====
In this episode, Martin helps to restore the Newcomen beam engine in the Black Country Living Museum, including making fire bricks using the original methods, restoring the timber frame, renovate the mechanical parts and clean the boiler. Covering Victorian mining methods Martin goes down the museum's mine shaft.

===== Brixham Sailing Trawler =====
In this episode, Martin helps to restore the oldest surviving Brixham sailing trawler, using traditional carpentry and rope making techniques (on rope making machines used for HMS Victory), as well as testing a self-made period life jacket. Examining the growth in popularity for fish and chips, he takes a trip on a deep sea trawler.

===== Birmingham Botanical Gardens =====
In this episode, Martin helps to restore Birmingham Botanical Gardens (United Kingdom), learning the Victorian method for glassblowing for the greenhouse panes, rebuilding the very first lawnmower, and for building a rockery. He covers the engineering behind the Victorian fashion for collecting plants from around the world, to be shown off in extravagant botanical gardens.

==== Guy Martin's Spitfire ====
Martin joins the two-year restoration of an early model of Supermarine Spitfire (Spitfire Mark Ia), N3200, squadron code 'QV', that had buried in a French beach for 46 years after being shot down during the Dunkirk evacuation, and tells the "Boy's Own"-style story of its pilot, Squadron Leader Geoffrey Stephenson. Saltwater corrosion ensured very little (if anything) was safely usable on the end aircraft.

==== Guy Martin: Last Flight of the Vulcan Bomber ====
In this feature length one-off special, Martin follows the final flights of the Cold War era Avro Vulcan Delta winged jet bomber XH558 Spirit of Great Britain. Having been restored to flight in 2007 by a charitable trust, it had been the last flying Vulcan, performing displays every year, until it was decided 2015 would be its last season due to its age and associated insurmountable engineering issues. Its last flight occurred on 28 October 2015. Martin joins the team with four months left, and once certified by the team's chief engineer, is permitted to assist in preparing it for a 1,000 miles (1,600 km) farewell tour, as it is jacked up for a vertical alignment test. Examining the design and history, he also meets former Vulcan pilots and the Red Arrows, who display with the aircraft, and aerial footage tracks it on the tours. Since in-flight cockpit access is only granted to Vulcan crew, he also flies alongside it in a formation with other aircraft. He also takes the controls of one of the other surviving Vulcans in taxiable condition, for a fast taxi manoeuvre (ground run to the point of nose lift).

=== Racing and speed ===
==== TT3D: Closer to the Edge ====
TT3D: Closer to the Edge is a documentary film about the Isle of Man TT races. The film examines what motivates the riders who race the TT and risk everything to become "King of the Mountain". Filmed in 3D, the film is a story about freedom of choice and the strength of human spirit. The film follows the leading riders in the 2010 race meeting, in particular Martin and Ian Hutchinson.

==== Speed with Guy Martin ====
In this series, Martin attempts various challenges based on speed using a variety of vehicles, mostly featuring record attempts. Three series of four hour-long episode were broadcast, along with three special episodes. This was despite Martin's reluctance to film a third series, saying that he would prefer to "move on while we are ahead", continuing with a few one-off specials.

==== Guy Martin's Wall of Death: Live ====
In this live special, Martin attempted to set a world speed record on a purpose-built version of the wall of death fairground attraction. It also featured recordings of Martin being trained by experienced rider Ken Fox on an existing wall to overcome dizziness, and being given aerial training to overcome the chief limiting factor, the effect of G-force on the human body. The science was explored by Hugh Hunt of Cambridge University, revealing the equation G=S^{2}/(25*D), where G is G-Force, S is speed in mph, and D is diameter of the wall, in metres. This revealed the chosen location, a hangar on Manby Airfield, would be too small for Martin's desired target of 160 km/h (100 mph), but with a revised target of 130 km/h (80 mph) while remaining below 7G, the 37.5 metre wall that was ultimately built would suffice. This would allow Martin to challenge a previous claimed record of around 110 km/h (70 mph), which the programme believed was wrong, determined through video analysis as having been 72 km/h (45 mph). For the show, Guinness World Records created a new record, Highest speed on a Wall of Death, and set an initial qualifying benchmark of 100 km/h (60 mph) in one of two attempts. On a first attempt, using an Indian Scout motorcycle, Martin managed to achieve 113.19 km/h (70.33 mph), while on a second run, on a bike purposely built by Martin (a 1972 Rob North T160 Trident triple), he extended the record to 125.77 km/h (78.15 mph). Prior to Martin's attempt, on the smaller wall, cyclist Shanaze Reade also set the Guinness record for Highest bicycle speed on a Wall of Death, at 42 km/h (26 mph).

=== Autobiographical ===
==== Guy Martin's Passion for Life ====
This one-off half hour programme explored various aspects of Martin's life. It was a repackaging of material previously released as four 7 minute long online only episodes, under Channel 4's Shorts brand, on their online platform 4oD. Episodes "Prized Possession" and "TT Racer" were released on 18 August 2014, followed by "Inside the Mind of a Racer" and "Proud Mechanic" on 1 October 2014. Proud Possession focuses on his Merlin engine.

==== Our Guy in Latvia ====
Martin travelled to Latvia to investigate the history of the Latvian side of his family – his deceased maternal grandfather, Walter Kidals, was a Latvian who had come to Britain in 1947 as a refugee from World War II. The family knew little about his story, with even Kidals' wife being unaware he was an orphan. Born Waldemars Kidals, the programme found that in 1941 he had been conscripted into the Latvian Legion, part of the Axis Forces when Nazi Germany had occupied Latvia, and later spent two years in a Belgian prisoner-of-war camp. Having been exonerated by the post-war trials, and with Latvia now part of the Soviet Union, all surviving former Latvian conscripts were allowed to settle in the United States and Britain as political refugees – Kidals opted for the UK, travelling to Hull.

In the programme, Martin met surviving members of his family and visited the now cleared site of his family's former farmhouse. Travelling in a 1982 Lada 1300S, he also visited an immersive Cold War Russian prison experience, and watched a reenactment of a battle between the Legion forces and the Soviet Red Army.

==== Our Guy In India ====
Martin is shown embarking on a 1,000 mi (1,600 km) motorbike trip, as he explores rarely seen aspects of modern India en route to Rider Mania, described as "one of the world's maddest bike races".

==== Our Guy In China ====
Martin's love of industry and endeavour leads him to China, where he reveals the unseen side of its innovation, technological development and gigantic manufacturing.

== Personal life ==
Martin lives in North Lincolnshire with his wife Sharon and their daughter.

Martin briefly owned the pub in his home village, which he has since sold.

Martin is not comfortable with being a public figure and rejects any notion that he is a celebrity, turning down offers such as Top Gear's Star in a Reasonably Priced Car segment. After struggling to come to terms with the fame brought about by his media work, Martin was diagnosed with Asperger syndrome. About his psychiatrist's findings, he says "It hasn't changed anything, it just confirms why I do certain things in a certain way." He prefers to live out of his van while racing or on television shoots. He had only watched one of his shows, the Pike's Peak episode of Speed, and this was only on the recommendation of a usually unimpressed friend.

In May 2026, Martin was the guest for BBC Radio 4's Desert Island Discs. His musical choices included "Hurt" by Johnny Cash, "The Day is My Enemy" by The Prodigy and "With or Without You" by U2. His book choice was "Stealing Speed" by Mat Oxley and his luxury item the back catalogue of Race Engine Technology magazine.

=== Personal vehicles ===
Martin owned a Merlin aero engine from a 1942 Lancaster bomber, and a Scania 144 530 truck engine. He also has a 1915 Amanco Chore Boy stationary engine with the original low tension magneto in his kitchen.

Martin owns a 2013 Ford Transit van and a unique Volvo Vöx supercar. The van is for general transport while the Vöx is just for special occasions, however he does his daily commute to his truck job on his mountain bike. He has owned various Vauxhall Astra vans, until a bad example put him off the type. He now swears by the reliability of the Transit, driving it around 40,000 mi (60,000 km) a year.

Martin bought the Vöx in 2012 from Koenigsegg engineer Mattias Vöcks. Based on a 1967 Volvo Amazon, it was upgraded and customised by Vöcks into an E85 biofuel powered 588 kW (788 bhp) vehicle, which Martin claims has reached 205 mph (330 km/h) on a racetrack. The Vöx followed a string of high performance cars Martin bought for special occasions (only ever owning one at a time, and sometimes only owning his van). At age 21 he bought a BMW E46 M3 CSL, followed by a Porsche GT3 RS at age 24, then a new BMW E92 M3 V8, and lastly before the Vöx, a 2010 Aston Martin V12 Vantage bought new at age 28.

Martin also owns a large collection of bicycles and motorcycles, including a Bimota. In bicycles, he has owned a Raleigh Chopper, then a Raleigh Mustang, Falcon Fattrack, but describes his first proper bike as being a Whyte 46 bought in 2005, followed by an Orange 224, Scott Ransom 10, Alpine 160, finally settling on a Cotic.

== Legal issues ==
By late-2011, Martin had accrued 21 penalty points on his standard UK driving licence, having been caught speeding several times in his Ford Transit van. He avoided a driving ban when on 18 points, being given another three in lieu of a ban, after the judge showed leniency due to the effect it would have on his livelihood, had he lost it. After a period of "driving like a saint" he was expecting to have regained a clean record by April 2015.

Following claims made in his 7 April 2015 Sunday Times review of the Aston Martin Vanquish, in which he recounted testing the car on an early morning lap of the Isle of Man TT course, police opened an investigation. Driving almost the full length of the TT course (joining at Quarterbridge garage and finishing at Governor's Bridge), he said he was impressed at how fast it really was, reaching 180 mph (290 km/h) down Sulby Straight and becoming airborne at Ballacrye corner, resulting in "something like a 22-minute lap". On 27 May, police confirmed that after taking advice from the Attorney General's Chambers, they would be taking no further action, while reminding residents and visitors that "Where there is no upper speed limit, road users must at all times be aware that there is a fine line between what is fast and what is dangerous." A few days later in a radio interview, Martin repeated the claims, and stated he had not broken the law as he had only reached high speeds on derestricted roads (i.e., those with no upper speed limit).

In November 2018, Martin appeared at Lincoln magistrates' court in relation to Northern Irish documentation submitted as part of an application for a UK driving licence. The matter was escalated to Lincoln Crown Court as he pleaded not guilty, opting for a jury trial. After an initial hearing in December 2018, the matter was referred for trial in July 2019.

Due to stand trial on 6 January 2020, in late-December 2019 the two charges were dropped, citing that Martin believed his licence from Northern Ireland was genuine, giving him a HGV-entitlement and that his autism made him "vulnerable enough for others to see him as an easy target" and that he "may well have been taken in by somebody".

In April 2026, Martin received a six‑month driving ban after reaching 12 penalty points, following two speeding offences on his motorbike.

== Bibliography ==
- Martin, Guy (3 October 2012). How Britain Worked. Ebury Publishing. ISBN 978-0091948092.
- Martin, Guy (1 January 2014). Speed: How to Make Things Go Really Fast. Ebury Publishing. ISBN 978-0091957018.
- Martin, Guy (8 May 2014). Guy Martin: My Autobiography. Virgin Books. ISBN 978-0753555026.
- Martin, Guy (22 October 2015). When You Dead, You Dead. Virgin Books. ISBN 978-0753556665.
- Martin, Guy (20 October 2016). Guy Martin: Worms to Catch. Virgin Books. ISBN 978-0753545300.
- Martin, Guy (18 October 2018). We Need to Weaken the Mixture. Virgin Books. ISBN 978-0753545348.
- Martin, Guy (28 April 2022). Dead Men Don't Tell Tales. Ebury Press. ISBN 978-1529108941.
- Martin, Guy (14 May 2026). All the Medals Have Been Handed Out. Ebury Spotlight. ISBN 978-1529968026.
