= Strathpuffer =

Annual amateur 24-hour winter Mountain bike race

Race details
- Region: Scotland
- Type: Winter mountain bike racing
- Web site: strathpuffer.co.uk

History
- First edition: 2006

The Strathpuffer is an annual amateur 24-hour winter Mountain bike race in the Scottish Highlands. The race is held in late January near Strathpeffer with around 17 hours of the race taking place in darkness. It was first held in 2006 and attracted more than 1,000 competitors in 2018.

== History ==
The circuit is circa 12.5 kilometre route through the Torrachilty Forest, on the outskirts of Contin. Competitors can enter as a solo rider, or as part of a team of two or fours. Alternatively, schools can also enter teams of eight. Around 17 hours of the race are in darkness.

In 2016 there were over 800 participants who faced mud and snow. By that point it had established a reputation as being one of the toughest mountain bike events in the world.

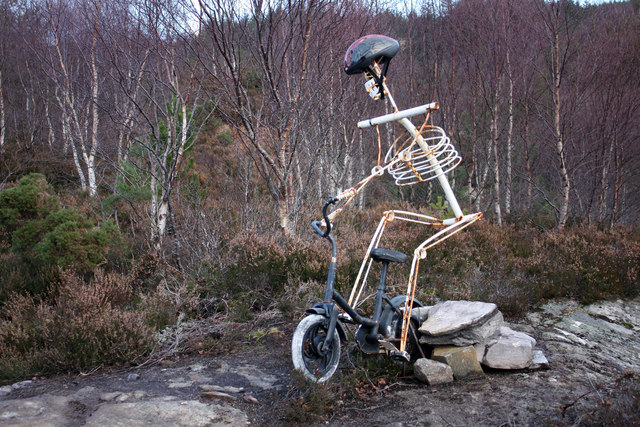
"Bill" the model skeleton marks the ceremonial halfway point.

In 2017 there were 6,583 laps completed by competitors. In 2018 the race attracted over 1,000 participants.

Guy Martin placed second in the male solo rider category in both 2014 and 2015.

== Recent Years ==
Due to its increase in popularity, it was planned for the Strathpuffer to grow by about 1.5 kilometres over 2018 and 2019, and those plans have since been put into place, making the track go from 11 kilometres to 12.5 kilometres.

In 2018 the BBC 2 show The Adventure Show covered the race and followed two teams around the course. One was a quad of girls from Dingwall Academy being mentored by the Adventure Syndicate and another was a team of two sisters calling themselves "Sister Sludge."

== Results ==
=== 2019 results ===
2019 Strathpuffer results
| Category | 1st place | 2nd place | 3rd place |
|---|---|---|---|
| Male Solo | Marty Ross - 25 laps | Keith Forsyth - 23 laps | Chris Pitblado - 22 laps |
| Female Solo | Sally Evamy - 17 laps | Annie Lloyd Evans - 16 laps | Eva Kupska -15 laps |
| Male Pairs | RT23 - 30 laps | Stage One - Mark Beaumont and Alex Glasgow - 30 laps | MBUK Magazine - 29 laps |
| Female Pairs | Jacqui and Julie - 21 laps | Fandango Ultimate Duo - 21 laps | The Linda Lawton Fan Club - 19 laps |
| Mixed Pairs | Team Breakpad - 24 laps | ABC - 24 laps | Fife Cycles - John Simpson Fan - 24 laps |
| Male Quads | ABC JMC Mountain Fuel - 31 laps | Squiggly Balls - 30 laps | Team Goon/Orange Fox Bikes - 29 laps |
| Female Quads | Gingym - 22 laps | Boo & Crew - 22 laps | 42 Engineer Regiment - 19 laps |
| Mixed Quads | BASE - 27 laps | GMBC ON ICE - 26 laps | 3 MEN AND A GINGER LADY - 25 laps |
| Schools (teams of eight) | Dingwall Academy - 26 laps | Fortrose Junior Team - 23 laps | Fortrose Senior Team - 22 laps |
Achievement awards are listed below.
| Youth Award | Team 56 Combined Minus 1 | | |
| Youngest Rider | Dougal Masterson - 11 years (in a team with Victor Atkinson) | | |
| Oldest Rider | Ron Smith - 79 years (solo) | | |
| Fastest Lap | MBUK Magazine - 39 mins 26 secs | | |

=== 2020 results ===
2020 Strathpuffer results
| Category | 1st place | 2nd place | 3rd place |
|---|---|---|---|
| Male Solo | Kyle Beattie - 25 laps | Robbie Mitchell - 25 laps | Martin Ross - 24 laps |
| Female Solo | Zara Mair - 18 laps | Natalie Munro - 17 laps | Claire Campbell - 17 laps |
| Male Pair | I - Cycles - 27 laps | Young and Old - 25 laps | Team Hair Loss - 24 laps |
| Female Pair | bennachie bike bothy - 21 laps | Double Trouble - 19 laps | BlaneRiders - 12 laps |
