= Hazel Marion Eaton =

American carnival sportswoman (1895–1970)

Hazel Marion Eaton (July 4, 1895 – December 22, 1970) was one of the first "mile-a-minute girls" to ride an Indian motorcycle in a carnival motordrome known as the Wall of Death.

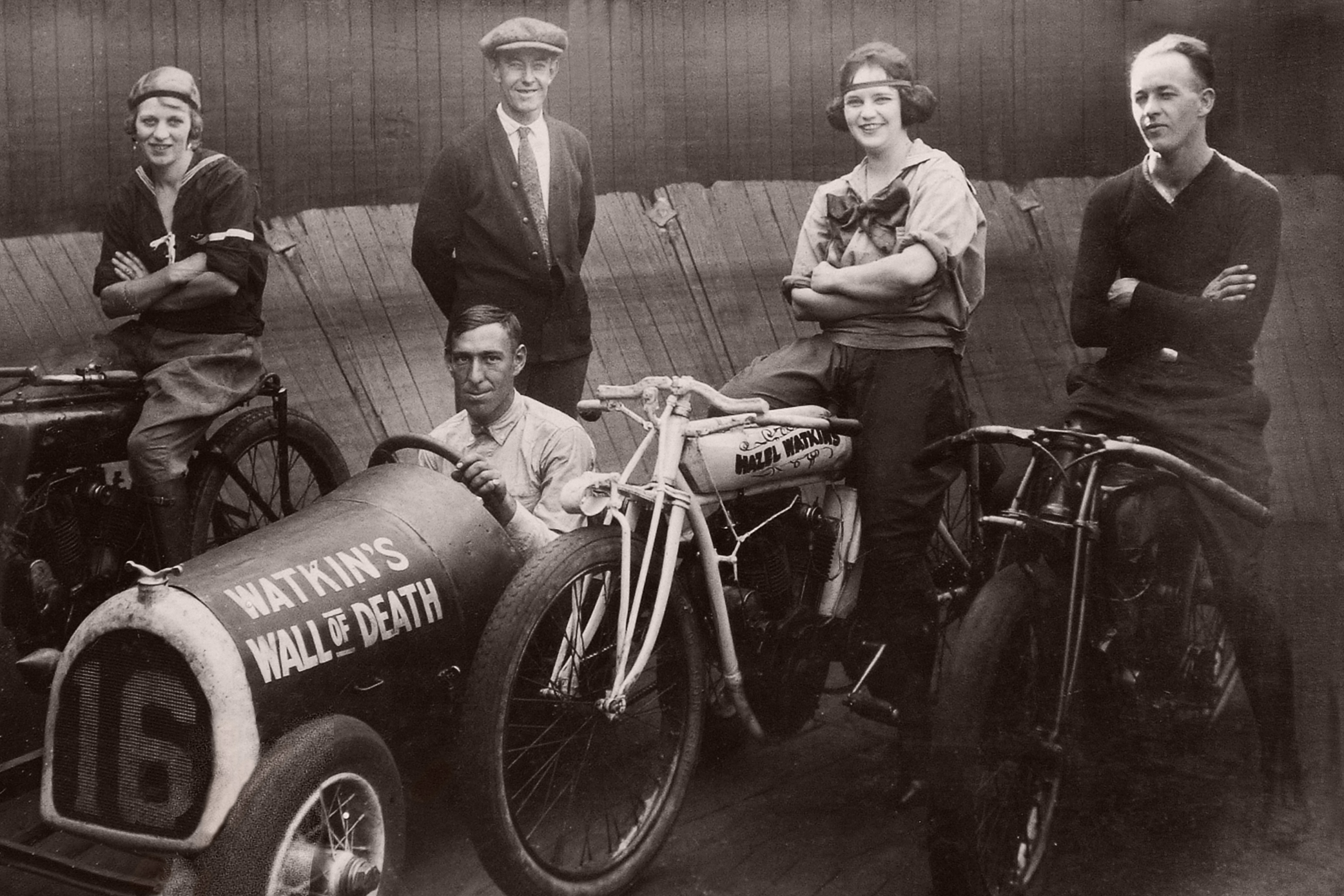
Hazel Eaton (2nd from right) inside the motordrome on her 1912 Indian motorcycle. Ira Watkins pictured far right.

== Early life ==
Hazel Marion Eaton was born on July 4, 1895, in the lighthouse tower at West Quoddy Head outside Lubec, Maine, where her father, Edwin L. Eaton, was the assistant light keeper (1895–1900). She was the only child born in the candy-striped tower due to construction in the permanent living quarters behind the lighthouse. Her mother, Jennie L. Johnson, a South Portland native, suffered from nausea due to paint fumes in the main house. Her husband ushered her into the tower to seek relief, but she immediately went into labor with Hazel.

When Eaton was five years old, her father was transferred to the Cape Elizabeth Lightship off the coast of Portland Head near Portland, Maine. The family moved to South Portland to a house on Preble St. In the next few years, Eaton was joined by a brother, Morris in 1902, and two sisters: Sybil in 1904, and Doris in 1906. Raised in South Portland, Maine, Eaton enjoyed a local reputation for diving and long distance swimming. After the Portland Sunday Telegram ran a story touting her swimming abilities, representatives from the Johnny Jones Exposition hired her to perform shallow diving feats from an elevated platform into a tank, hoop rolling and trained monkey acts. By 1912 Eaton had taken on another spectacular, but dangerous occupation - motordrome thrill racing.

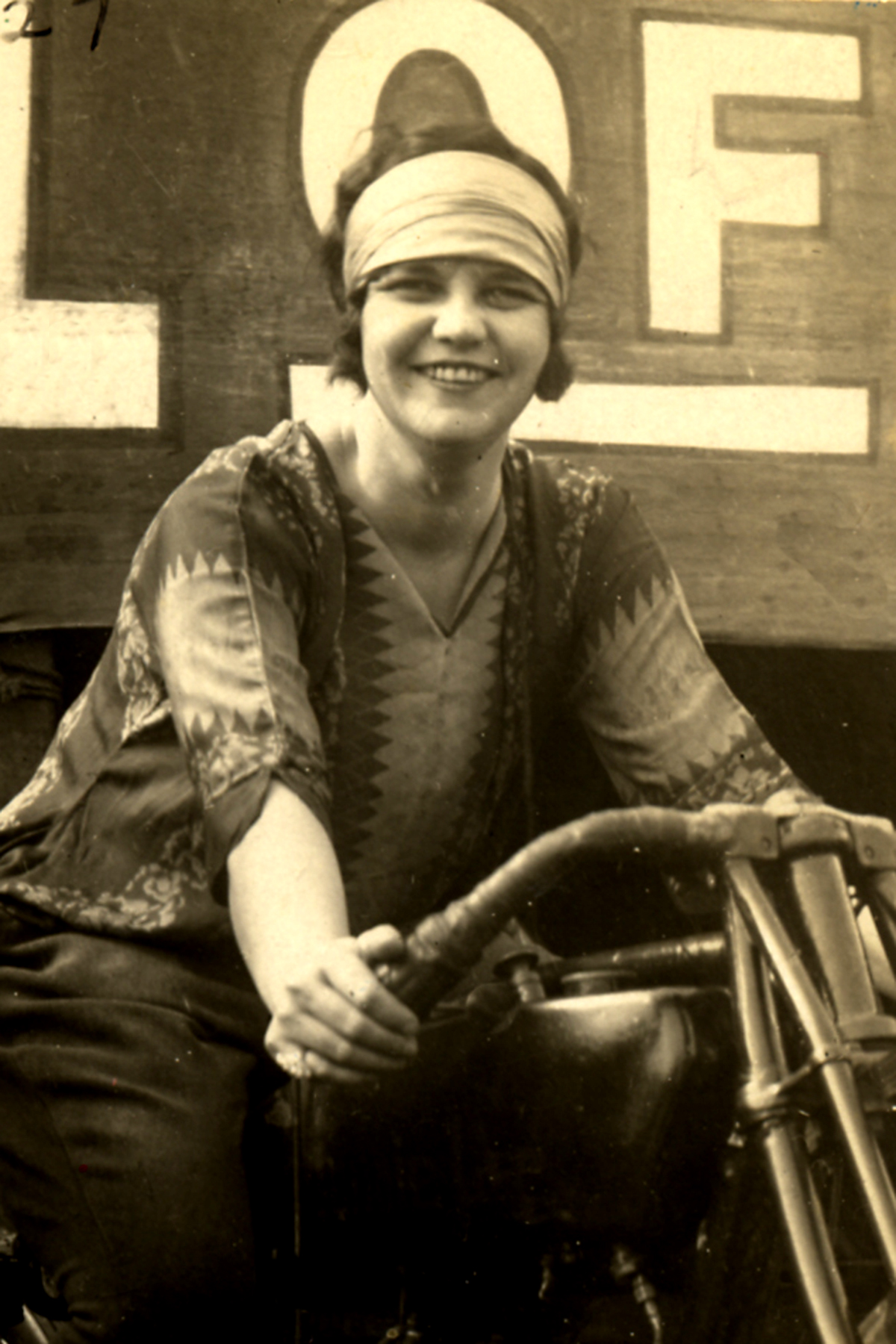
Hazel Eaton in 1927 riding in Hager's Wall of Death.

In 1910, Eaton ran away from home to join the Johnny Jones Exhibition as a high dive act in Bangor, Maine. Within two years she met Ira Watkins. Watkins had his own show and lured the adventurous Eaton to train, then participate in “Watkins’s Wall of Death” motordrome. She married Watkins in 1917 and one year later gave birth to her only child, Beverly June Watkins. In 1920, due to the nomadic lifestyle of circus performers, Ira Watkins’s mother, Emma, took custody of Beverly and raised her in Rutland, Vermont.

== Motordrome career ==
A motordrome, also known as “The Wall of Death,” is a barrel-shaped track made of smooth two-by-four-inch boards that bank upward at a 45-60 degree angle. Eaton rode her 1912 Indian motorcycle along the inside of the barrel wall at speeds up to 60 miles per hour—often with no hands. She told a reporter that although the riding appeared to be “clever,” she more or less functioned without really thinking about the danger or what she was doing. Onlookers, who stood at the top of the barrel as riders edged closer and closer to the top, were unaware of the ease with which the riders performed—for the most part. On one occasion, Eaton’s back brake locked during a performance. She tumbled to the bottom of the motordrome and spent several weeks in the hospital suffering from head and facial injuries. While death was common in the motordrome, Eaton’s injuries never stopped her from riding the walls.

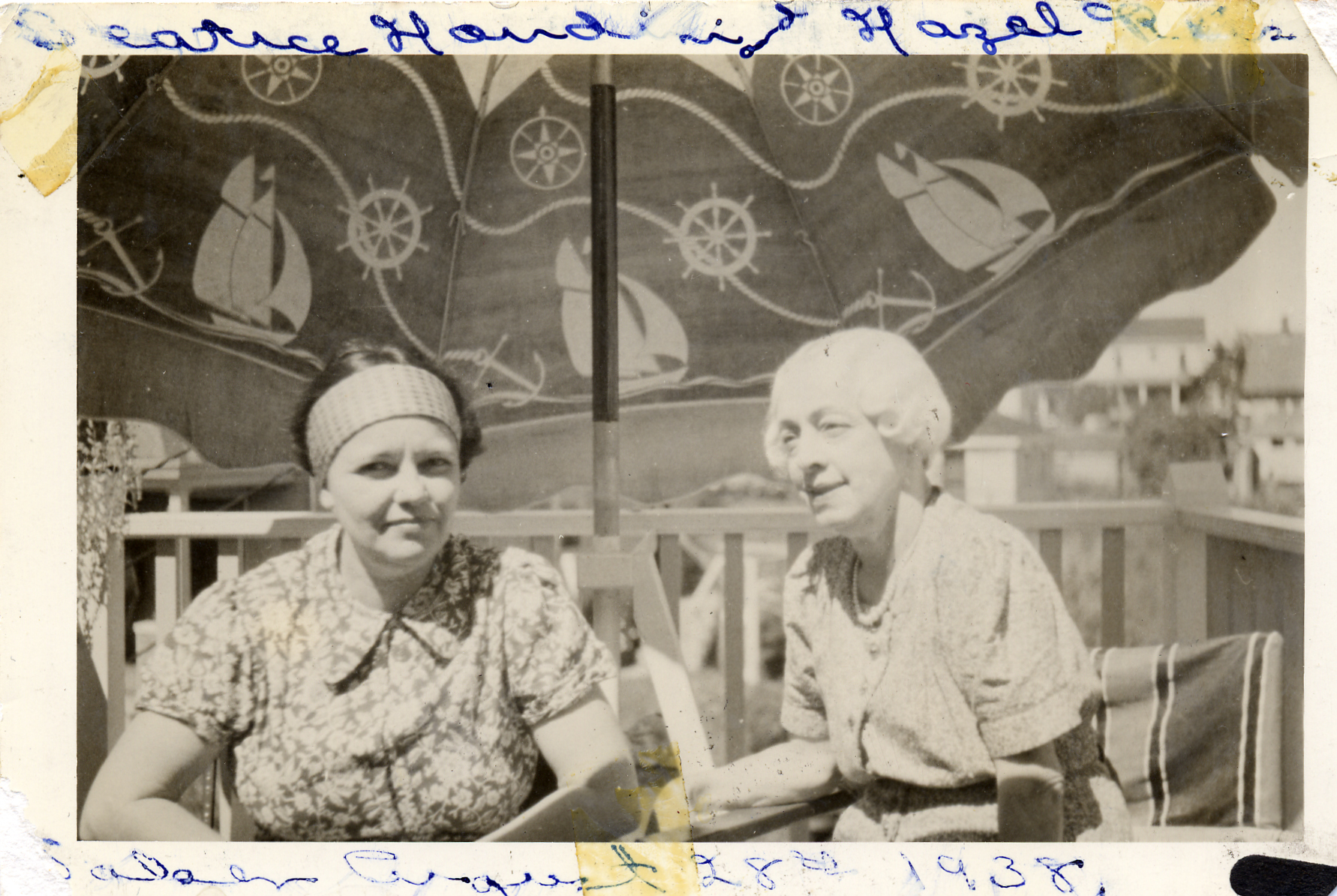
Hazel Eaton with Beatrice Houdini August 28, 1938.

After 15 years of trick riding in the motordrome, Eaton divorced Ira Watkins, then purchased and managed her own show for several years, traveling throughout the world and every state in America. She married Jesse Reis, a traveling circus auditor, in 1928. Together they continued to contract with circus troupes until 1942. Beatrice Houdini, who became a close friend of the Reis’s and wintered with them in Florida, requested Eaton hold a private seance in her home on Halloween night 1936, simultaneous to other seances held around the country, to connect with Harry Houdini who had died in 1926. Beatrice Houdini was on her way to visit the Reis’s Rainbow Farm in Yarmouth, Maine when she died in 1943. Eaton remained in Yarmouth, Maine until 1958 when she moved to Mt. Dora, Florida, for health reasons. She died there in December 1970.
