= Wall of death =

Carnival sideshow with motorcycles

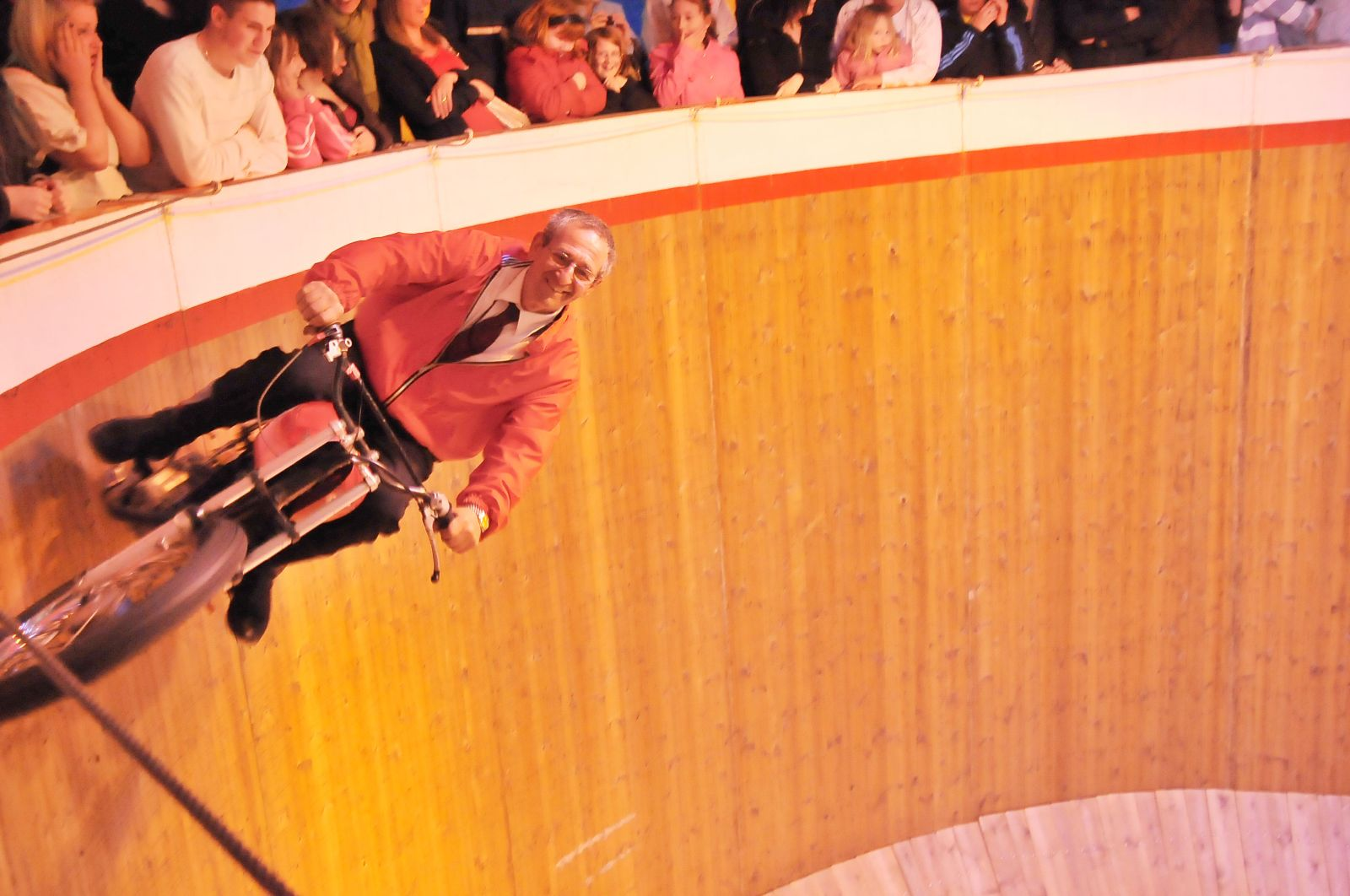
A stuntman performing inside the well of death. He is able to sustain his vehicle's grip on the wall by virtue of friction and centripetal force.

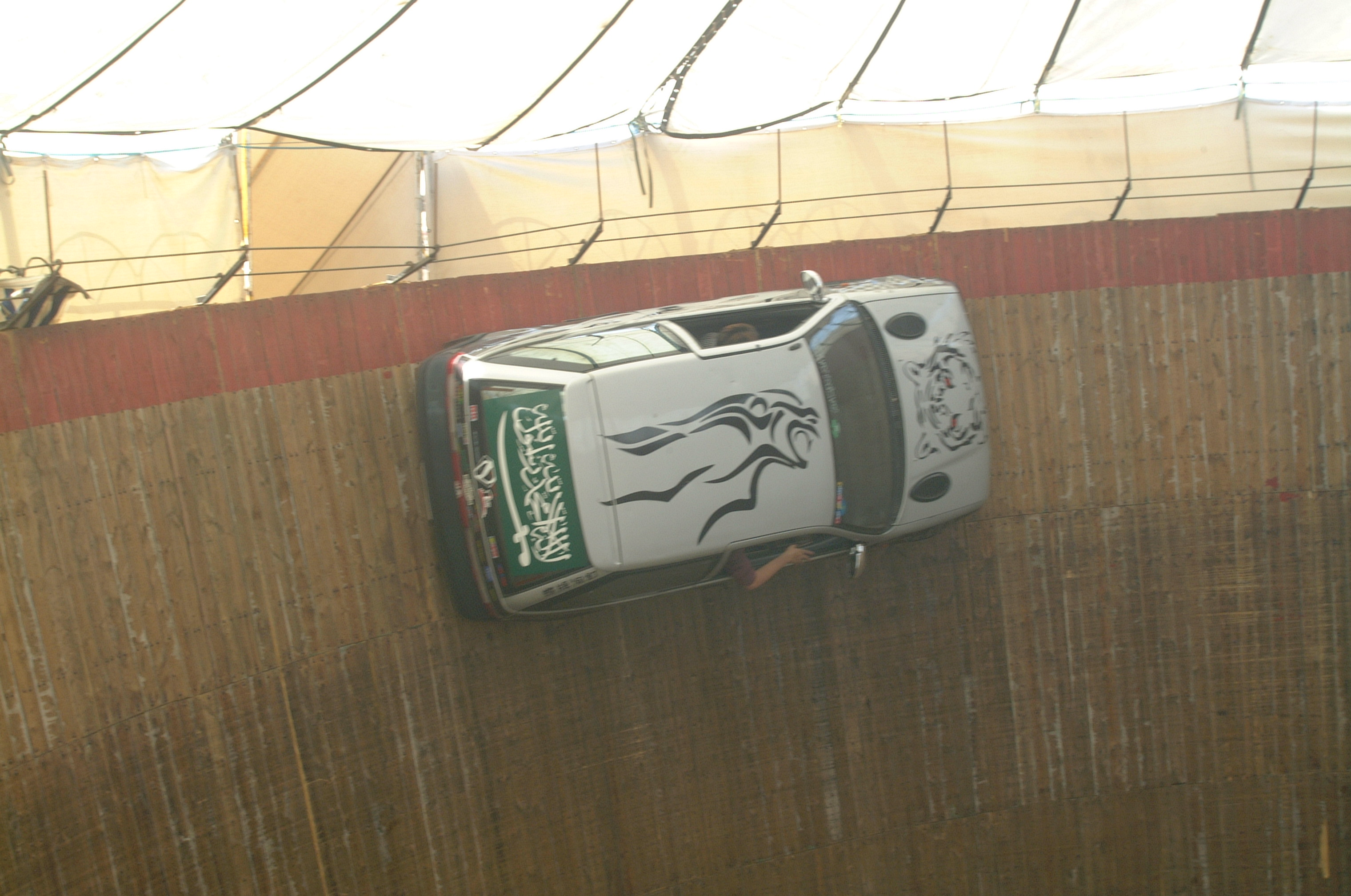
Saudi driver Saeed Aldouweghri in 2003.

The wall of death, motordrome, velodrome or well of death is a carnival sideshow featuring a silo- or barrel-shaped wooden cylinder, typically ranging from 20 to 36 feet (6.1 to 11.0 m) in diameter and made of wooden planks, inside which motorcyclists, or the drivers of miniature automobiles and tractors travel along the vertical wall and perform stunts, held in place by friction and centrifugal force.

== Overview ==
Four-motocycle stunt at Motodrom, Oktoberfest 2017

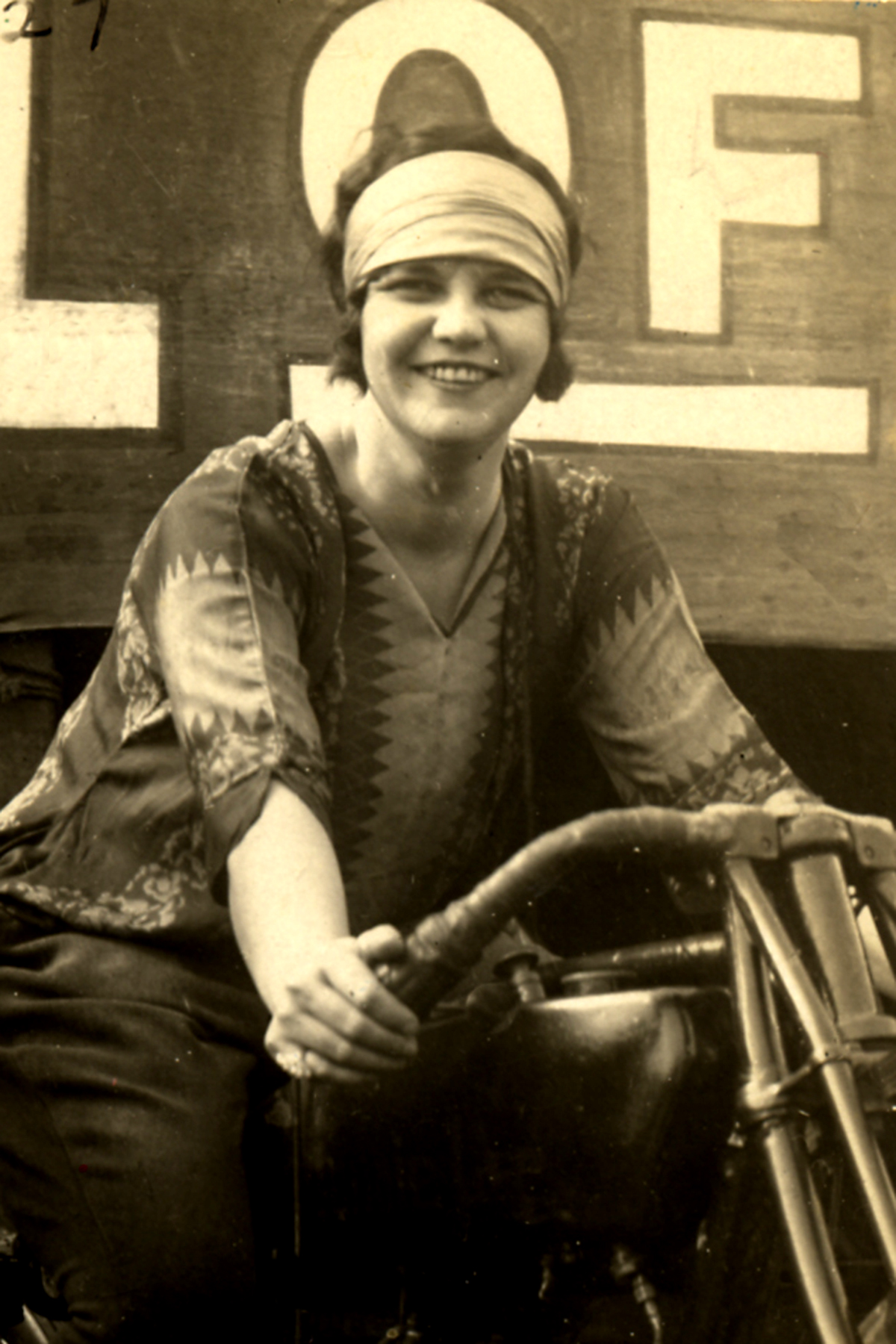
Hazel Marion Eaton, who performed with Hager's Wall of Death in the 1920s

Derived directly from United States motorcycle board track (motordrome) racing in the early 1900s, the very first carnival motordrome appeared at Coney Island amusement park (New York) in 1911. The following year portable tracks began to appear on travelling carnivals. By 1915 the first "velodromes" with vertical walls appeared and were soon dubbed the "Wall of Death," the very first mention being Bridson Greene's unit in Buffalo, New York. Although not a silo-drome, the large combination motordrome at the 1915 Panama Pacific International Exposition included a perfectly vertical section at the top that was used by both car and motorcycle riders.

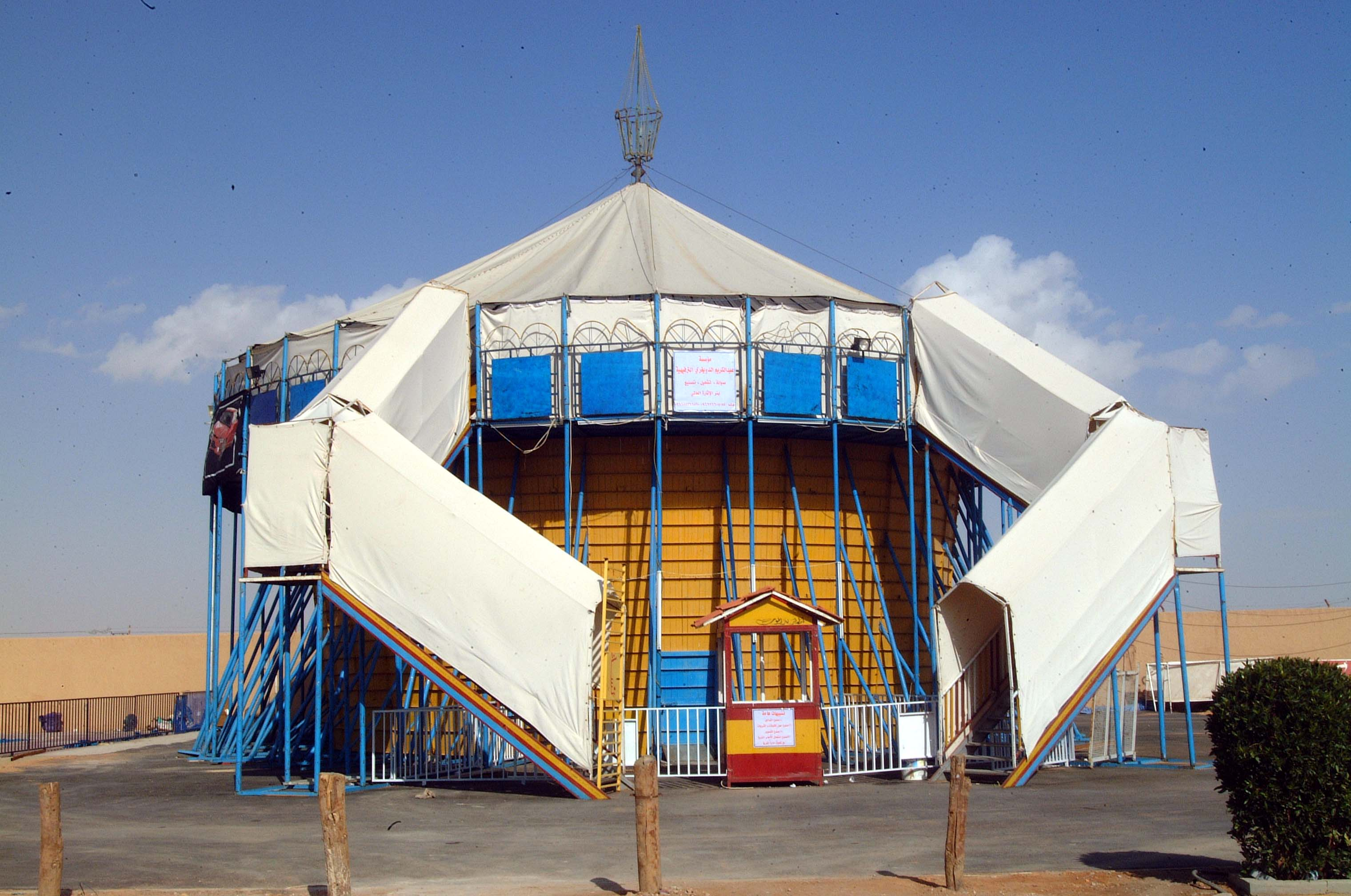
Wall of death in Saudi Arabia 2003

The motorcycles most widely used were the first generation Indian Scout models (pre-1928) with 37 cu. in. displacement. Royal American Shows out of Tampa, Florida was one of the largest travelling carnivals and used 1928 to 1931 Scouts. This carnival attraction became a staple in the United States outdoor entertainment industry with the phenomenon reaching its zenith in the 1930s, with more than 100 motordromes on traveling shows and in amusement parks.

The audience views from the top of the drum, looking down. The riders start at the bottom of the drum, in the centre, and ascend an initial ramped section until they gain enough speed to drive perpendicular to the floor, usually in a counter-clockwise direction (the physical explanation behind this act is found at banked turn and the turning car.) In the United States the American Motor Drome Company uses several vintage Indian Scout Motorcycles from the 1920s to give the audience a view of how these shows were done in their heyday. The American Motor Drome Company is the only wall of death to have two riders Inducted into the Sturgis Motorcycle Hall of Fame; Jay Lightnin' (2014) and Samantha Morgan (2006). In 2015 the Indian Motorcycle company chose the American Motor Drome Company to preview the new 2015 Indian Scout by putting it on their wall along with the 1926 and 1927 Indians that were regularly used in their show. The newest wall of death show in the United States is the 'Wild Wheels Thrill Arena' which will be performing in the Traditional Style of the Carnival Midway Shows.

== United Kingdom ==
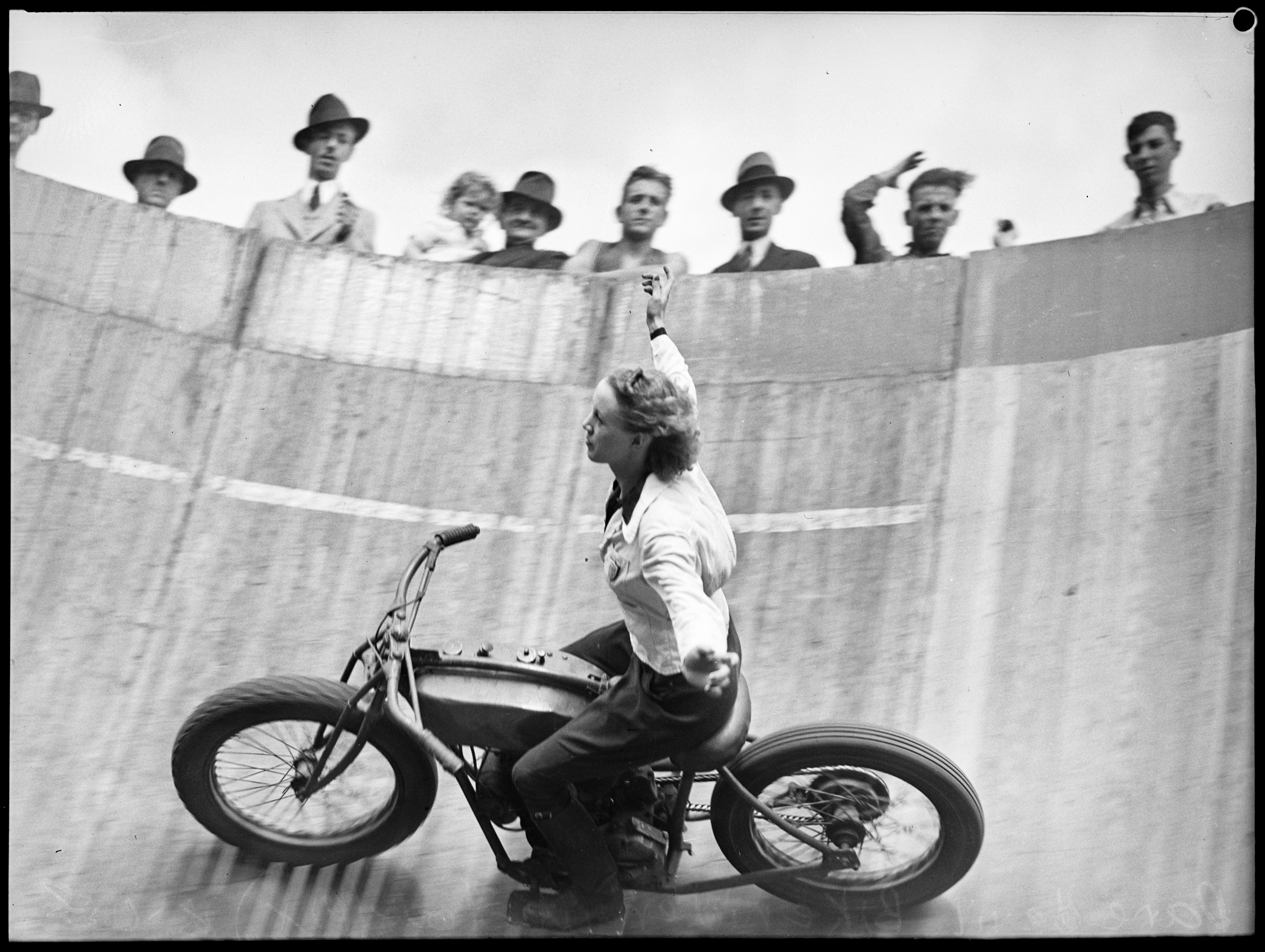
Motorcyclist Clara Lee riding the ‘Wall of Death’, Sydney Easter Show, 1938

Several wall riding acts evolved simultaneously in the United Kingdom in the late 1920s. Northern Speedway star Clem Beckett developing his own wall and dome riding sideshows at races and fairs; Beckett was well known to fellow Lancastrian George Formby who included pastiches of Beckett and a mock wall of death routine in his stage act and later in his films No Limit and Spare a Copper. The first wall of death in the British Isles appeared in Southend during June 1929 at the Kursaal Amusement Park, one of the world's first amusement parks, and featured motorcycles on a 20 ft wooden wall. The first riders were husband and wife, Billy and Marjorie Ward who had previously been touring with the show in South Africa where they were seen by Malcolm Campbell. In the UK, Kursaal and George 'Tornado' Smith became synonymous with the sideshow. By the mid-1930s, there were 50 such shows touring the counties and stunts, with riders like Arthur Brannon and included riding sidecars with animals on board including a lioness; however, World War II put a temporary end to the shows. A few were restarted after the war and the Todd Family Wall of Death was featured at the Festival of Britain in 1951, with Frank Senior, George, Jack, Bob and Frank Junior riding. Women riders often performed with them including Gladys Soutter, who is thought to have been the first woman rider in England and, later, her sister Winniefred (Wyn) Soutter who went on to marry George Todd who was also a wall rider. Women continue to do so to this day.

The act is still often seen at fairs. In the 2000s, there remain only a few touring walls of death. "The Demon Drome", "Messhams Wall of Death" and the "Ken Fox Troupe". These acts feature original American Indian motorcycles which have been in use since the 1920s. A similar act called the "Globe of Death" has the riders looping inside a wire mesh sphere rather than a drum. This form of motorcycle entertainment had a separate and distinct evolution from carnival motordromes and derived from bicycle acts or "cycle whirls" in the early 1900s. The building of a wall of death features as the central theme of Irish film Eat the Peach.

On 28 March 2016, Guy Martin (successful Isle of Man TT Racer) set the world record for the wall of death. He reached a speed of 78.150 mph (125.770 km/h) during a live broadcast titled Guy Martin's Wall of Death on UK television Channel 4.The world record was set in a wall of death of 37 meters diameter, special-built for this attempt.

== India ==
In India, the "well of death" (in Hindi: मौत का कुआँ, romanized: maut kā kuām̥, Punjabi: ਮੌਤ ਦਾ ਖੂਹ, romanized: maut dā khūh, Malayalam: മരണ കിണർ, romanized: marana kiṇaṟ) can be seen in the various melas (fairs) held across the country. Apart from motorcycles, the act may also feature other vehicles such as automobiles, as performed regularly in Adilabad in India since 2005.

The show involves a temporary cylindrical structure about 25 feet high and 30 feet in diameter, or wider when cars are to be involved, built of hardwood planks. The audience stands upon the platform built around the circumference of the structure and gazes down into the well where the motorcyclists or cars drive.

== Germany ==
Jagath Perera performing various acrobatic tricks at Pitt's Todeswand, Oktoberfest 2017

Walls of death began to appear at German funfairs in the late 1920s. They were mostly travelling enterprises that were passed on from owner to owner for several decades. It was not uncommon for a wall of death to change its name several times as it was passed on. For example, a wall of death that was commissioned in 1928 by Joseph Ruprecht in Munich under the name "Die Steile Wand" or "Todeswand" was operated later, in the 1950s, as "Die Auto-Steilwand" and, since 1984, as "Motodrom".

Today, there are two performing walls of death left that are still touring Germany: the original "Motodrom", operated since 2012 by Donald "Don Strauss" Ganslmeier, and Pitt's Todeswand, opened in 1932 and now operated by Sri Lankan stunt driver Jagath Perera. They are still regular guests at funfairs such as Oktoberfest in Munich, as well as at motorcycle-related events and fairs.
