= Rider Mania =

BOBMC Rider Mania (BOBMC RM) is an event hosted by Brotherhood of Bulleteers Motorcycling Consortium (BOBMC) member clubs in India every year. It is the annual gathering of Indian Royal Enfield motorcycle owners. The event was initially organised by Vernon Dias in 2003. The event lasts for 2 days with bikers and motorcycle clubs in attendance.

The event is now organized by different host clubs of BOBMC with differing locations each year including Goa, Mumbai, Hyderabad, Ooty, Nagpur, Kolkata, Delhi and Shillong in the North., the 2014 event was hosted by the Madras Bulls in Chennai on 18 and 19 January 2014. Over 800 riders had registered for event as reported by Overdrive . It was hosted by Road Survivors chandigarh In 2015, Indiethumpers, Mumbai in 2018 and in 2019 India Bull Riders placed a milestone at Udaipur by the name of #AanDo BOBMC Rider Mania 2019.

== History ==
=== 2003–2004: early years ===
Rider Mania dates back to 2003 when it was first hosted in Goa and approximately 74 bikers attended. Rider Mania 2004 was again organized in Goa on 10 January at Riva resorts in North Goa and approximately 130 bikers attended.

=== 2005–present ===
Starting 2005 it was hosted by BOBMC member clubs, beginning with Inddiethumpers, Mumbai. The event was held at Raigarh Resorts, Panvel on 8 January in which over 360 riders participated.

In 2006 it was hosted by Madras Bulls Motorcycling Club. Over 400 bikers participated and it was held at Casuarina Bay Beach Resort on 21 Jan, Chennai.

In 2007, Rider Mania was hosted by Wanderlust Motorcycling Club at Star Key Point Resorts, Nagpur on 24 January. 199 Bikers participated.

In 2008, The Wanderers from Hyderabad organized it at Ramoji Film City on 18 January. Around 400 bikers participated.

In 2009, it was hosted by Rolling Thunder Motorcycling Club and was called the RIDER MANIA RTMC Ishtyle. It was held at Ooty on 24 January. 670 riders participated.

In 2010, Inddie Thumpers from Mumbai hosted it. The event was named as RMX and was held at Vikram Garh on 24 January, at a resort outside Mumbai. Around 650 riders joined the fest.

In 2011, #Eastern Bulls hosted the event and called it the RM-East. Held on 22 January 2011 the event witnessed over 550 people.

In 2012, the event went to Gurgaon hosted by Royal Beasts, New Delhi which saw over 700 riders participate.

In 2013, it was hosted by Royal Enfield Riders Association of Meghalaya (RERAM) in Cherrapunji. It was attended by over 400 riders. FORE (Friends of Royal Enfield, Nepal was the sole club from outside of India.

In 2014, the Madras Bulls Motorcycling Club (MBMC), hosted the Rider Mania. Announced as the biggest Rider Mania till that year, it pulled around 1200+ avid bullet riders from across India and Nepal. Held on 18 and 19 January 2014 at Mahabalipuram.

In 2015, the Road survivors(RS) hosted the Rider Mania #dohajarpandrah at kikar lodge and around 900+ bikers attended the event from all over the India and Nepal

In 2016, Wanderlust Motorcycle Club from Nagpur hosted the Rider Mania. They titled it "Full Power". Wanderlust MC broke Madras Bulls' record & presented the Biggest ever Rider Mania till 2016. More than 1700 Royal Enfield lovers were the witness of the RM16. It was held at Nagpur outside village named Waki.

In 2017 Rider Mania Rolling Thunder Motorcycle Club (RTMC) of Bangalore. RTMC along with volunteer clubs from the country, formed the "Southern Squadron" to host the RM17 at the Arabian Sea coastal area Kundapur. It is about 450 km west from Bangalore.

In 2018 Inddie Thumpers from Mumbai hosted again this time at a place called Bhor near Pune. This time they decided to call it MahaRM.

In 2019, #AANDO(i.e.-"Let It Come") was the call for Motorcycle Riders all-over the world to participate in BOBMC Rider Mania 2019 hosted by India Bull Riders Motorcycle Club (IBRMC). This event took place at Paneri Farm House, Ghasiyar village (Udaipur), situated between the Aravali hills in Udaipur. #AANDO 2019 was a 'Milestone' in the history of BOBMCRM as the barren hills (mainly hills) were turned into an event ground by the dedicated team of IBRMC. Approximately 1700 riders from India and abroad attended the event.

In 2020, #ChaloNepal (Lets Go to Nepal) was the tagline of the event BOBMC Rider Mania. This year BOBMCRM gone "International" and organized successfully at Nepal by "FORE" Motorcycle Club (FORE Stands for "Friends Of Royal Enfield"). This event's ground was set at Lake shore of Pame Lake, Pokhara(Nepal) surrounded by Pame lake at one side and other sides were covered by hills; Despite the challenge of flood ground, FORE team managed to set the ground well for the event and organized it very well.

After a long gap of two years, Wanderers Hyderabad hosted the BOBMC Rider Mania in 2022 at Hyderabad with the tagline "Ab ki baar, Chaarminar" (This time Chaarminar).

The BOBMC Rider Mania 2023 was held at Orchid Lake Resort, Umiam, Shillong (Meghalaya) from 21 January 2023 to 22 January 2023. The event was organized by the Royal Enfield Rider's Association Meghalaya (RERAM) under the theme "HOI-KIW", which translates to "Chalo-Chalo" in Hindi and "Let's Go" in English. The event marked a resumption of motorcycle rallies in the region following COVID-19 pandemic restrictions.

== Brotherhood ==
All the clubs participating in Rider Mania are part of the Brotherhood of Bulleteers Motorcycling Consortium (BOBMC). In 2014, 52 of these clubs participated in Rider Mania '14, and they also come together during regular events like Rider Mania, North East Riders Meet, Gaddha Mania and anniversary gatherings of individual clubs.

== Music ==
Music is an integral part of the festival. The event usually features an open stage where event participants are encouraged to perform with the evenings seeing a professional band's performance.
