= Forces Financial =

British financial services company

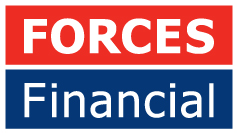
- Company type: Insurance
- Industry: Financial services
- Founded: 1999
- Defunct: February 2014
- Fate: Acquired
- Successor: Police Mutual
- Headquarters: Ipswich, United Kingdom
- Products: Insurance
- Number of employees: 140 (2014)

Forces Financial was a British insurance company providing services to the UK military forces. It was established in 1999 and was acquired by Police Mutual in 2014. The company was based in Suffolk with its company headquarters situated in Ipswich. Before its acquisition it has around 180,000 members in the police and military in three UK locations and 16 military branches including Germany and Cyprus. It employed 140 people in three UK locations - Ipswich, Hook in Hampshire and Hessle in Yorkshire

In February 2014, Police Mutual acquired Forces Financial for an undisclosed fee. Police Mutual is a mutual society, providing Serving and Retired Police Officers, Police Staff and their families with financial products.

Forces Financial sponsored Army Hockey, a part of the MoD sport compensation scheme.
