= Ian Hutchinson (motorcyclist) =

English motorcycle racer (born 1979)

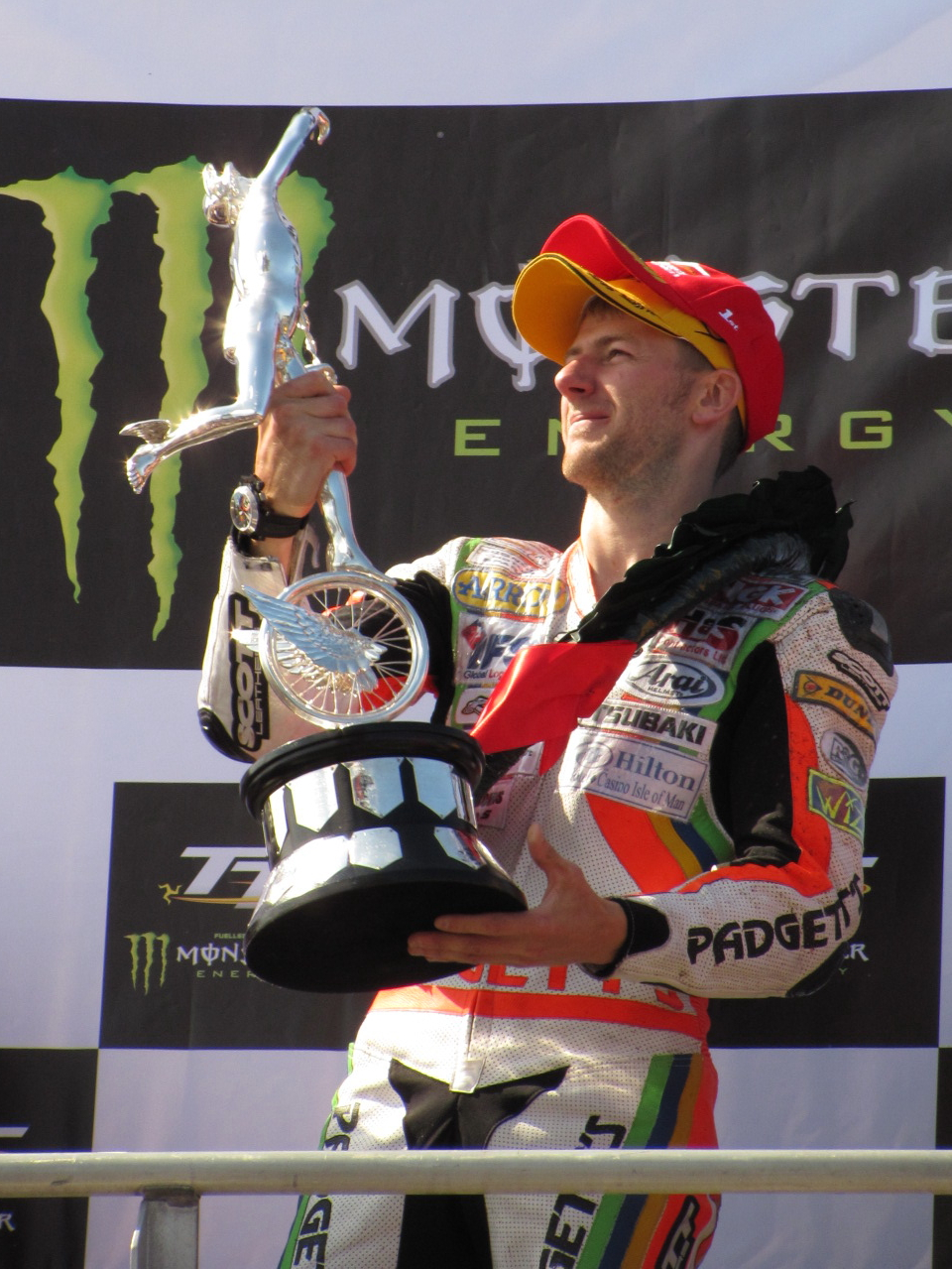
- Hutchinson after winning the second Supersport Junior TT race at the 2010 Isle of Man TT; a record-equalling fourth win in one TT meeting.
- Nationality: English
- Born: 12 August 1979 (age 47); Bingley, West Yorkshire, England
- Current team: MLav Racing
- Bike number: 12
Motorcycle racing career statistics
Isle of Man TT career
TTs contested	14 (2004-2010, 2012, 2014-2019, 2022, 2024-present)
TT wins	16
First TT win	2007 Supersport Junior TT
Last TT win	2017 Superstock TT
TT podiums	27

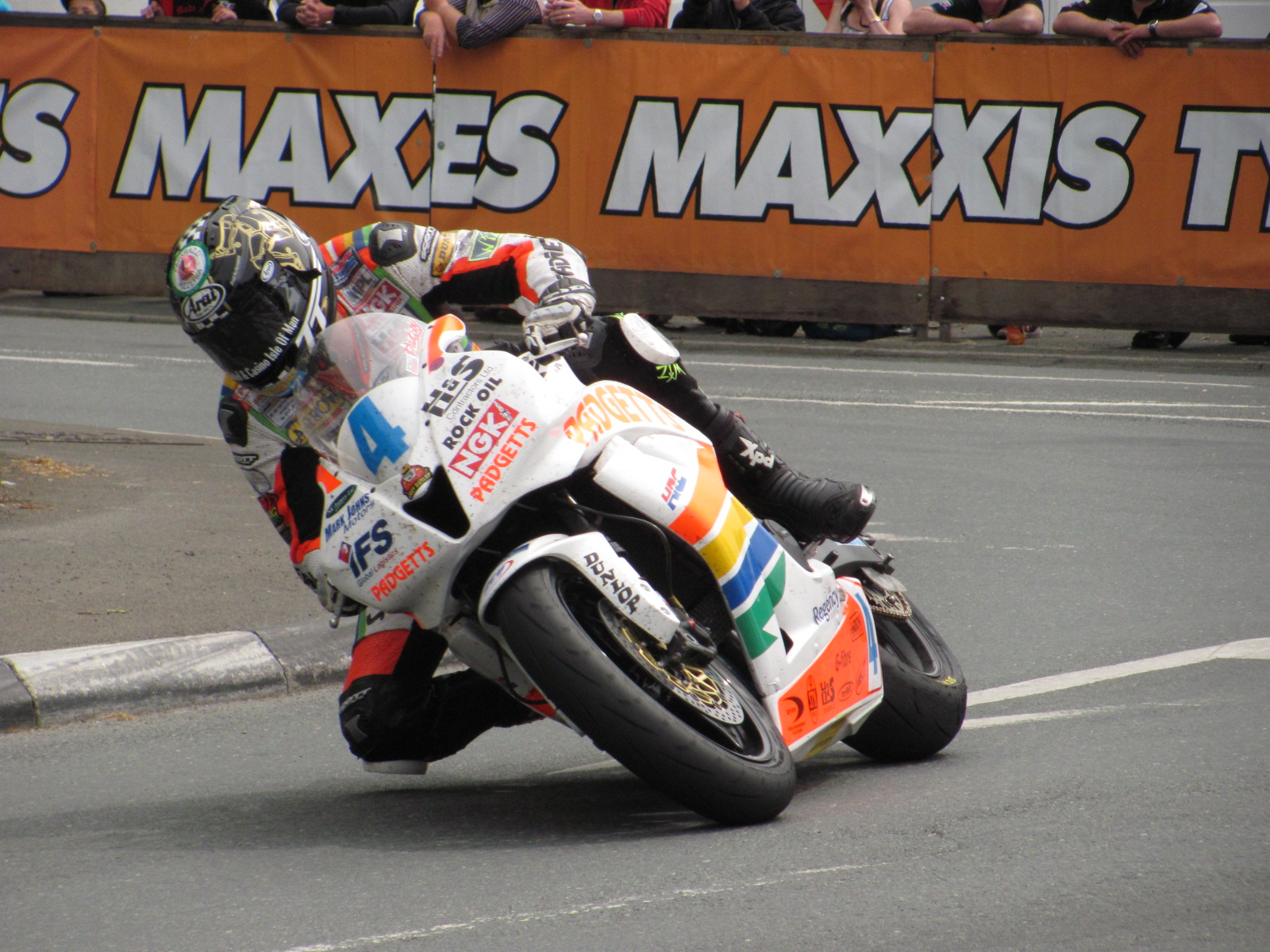
Hutchinson in the 2010 Junior TT

Ian Hutchinson (born 12 August 1979 in Bingley, West Yorkshire), also known by his nicknames "the Bingley Bullet" or "the Miracle Man", and "Hutchy", is an English professional motorcycle road racer specialising in events held on closed public roads, such as the Isle of Man TT, the North West 200 and Ulster Grand Prix.

Hutchinson's most successful racing year was in 2010, when he set the record of winning the most races in a single Isle of Man TT festival in June, achieving five solo wins, preceded by Supersport class at the North West 200 in Northern Ireland. At a British Supersport round in September, Hutchinson crashed in wet conditions soon after the start suffering a badly broken left leg after being hit by a following rider's machine. The leg-break needed many surgical operations and much time to recover. He again fractured the leg in 2012 when riding an off-road bike practicing exhibition-riding for a motorcycle show at the Excel Arena in London.

Returning to racing with modifications to his race machines involving changing the gear-lever to the right side and fitting a thumb-operated rear brake instead of a footbrake lever, in 2013, Hutchinson won the Macau Grand Prix.

In 2015, Hutchinson had a dramatic return to top form with three wins, a second and third places at the 2015 Isle of Man TT races riding PBM Kawasaki (1000 cc) and Team Traction Control Yamaha (600 cc) machines, which contributed to his overall points tally, winning the Joey Dunlop TT Championship Trophy for 2015.

Hutchinson also competed in selected rounds of the 2015 British Superbike Championship on the Kawasaki ZX-10R.

Hutchinson was placed sixth in his last race on the PBM Kawasaki at the Macau Grand Prix in November 2015. For 2016, he was contracted to ride Tyco BMWs for the Superbike and Superstock classes, with a return to Keith Flint's Team Traction Control Yamahas for the Supersport class at North West 200, Isle of Man TT, and Ulster Grand Prix.

In 2017, Hutchinson crashed during a race on the Isle of Man breaking his thighbone. Subsequent races on the Isle of Man in 2018 were not successful, with three DNFs together with places at 11 and 16, and three DNFs in 2019.

Hutchinson suffered from a stroke in early 2023, which sidelined him from the entire racing season.

Hutchinsons's nickname Miracle Man also used as his Autobiography title stems from his ability to recover from severe injuries and repeat successful campaigns. His 2010 Isle of Man TT also is considered a miracle because a full sweep at the event has never happened before and since. Multiple of his sustained injuries were considered career ending but he managed to make a recovery to a successful comeback at least four times.

Prior to becoming a professional road-racer, Hutchinson worked as a motorcycle mechanic for the late Colin Appleyard, MBE.

== Career ==
=== Race wins ===
- Isle of Man TT, 16, 2007 (1), 2009 (2), 2010 (5), 2015 (3), 2016 (3), 2017 (2)
- North West 200, 1 (2010)
- Macau Grand Prix, 1 (2013)

=== 2003–05 ===
Hutchinson made his debut on the Island at the 2003 Manx Grand Prix, winning the Newcomers race on a 600cc Honda, beating the 750cc Suzukis of Jonathan Ralph and Alex Donaldson.

The 2004 North West 200 was a nightmare for Hutchinson, as within yards of starting his first practice lap of the circuit, he injured his leg and put himself out of the meeting. Hutchinson made his Isle of Man TT debut in 2004, competing in four races all on board a Suzuki. Despite recording the eighth fastest lap in the final Junior TT practice session, Hutchinson would only take one top ten finish in the Formula One TT, edging out Manx rider Gary Carswell by 2.3 seconds after 150 miles racing. He also competed in selected races of the British Superstock Championship. He returned to the Isle of Man in 2005, but this time campaigned Hondas throughout the races. After making the top five in Superstock practice, Hutchinson ended the week with three top tens and an eleventh-place finish. He also made his debut at the Ulster Grand Prix in 2005 and continued with selected British Superstock races.

=== 2006: McAdoo Kawasaki ===
After Ryan Farquhar moved from McAdoo Racing to TAS Suzuki, Hutchinson was signed up by McAdoo to ride their Kawasaki in 2006. The partnership had immediate success, with Hutchinson winning the 600cc Supersport Race at the North West 200, edging out Rob Frost and Bruce Anstey with the top three split by just under two seconds. He also recorded the fastest Supersport lap in the history of the event, recording a lap of 116.881 mph. He then enjoyed his best ever TT meeting, with two seconds and a third, although one of the runner-up positions was stripped from him, due to his Kawasaki ZX-6 being deemed to be illegal due to a 0.2mm (0.02 cm) difference in cam dimensions. He repeated this performance at the Ulster Grand Prix, losing out to Guy Martin in both Supersport races.

Hutchinson also continued in Superstock, with a best finish of second twice at Oulton Park. He pulled out of the championship after his second Oulton second, and would finish sixth overall having been second after Oulton with 100 points. He moved up into the British Supersport Championship replacing the injured Pere Riba on the MSS Discovery Kawasaki in the final four rounds. He finished fifteenth in the championship, on 42 points.

=== 2007: HM Plant Honda ===
Hutchinson moved to HM Plant Honda for the 2007 road racing season, and achieved four podiums at the 2007 Isle of Man TT including his first TT win during the Supersport Junior TT, beating John McGuinness by just 2.84 seconds. He also took his first win at the Ulster Grand Prix, with a win in the Superbike race. He also competed in the British Supersport Championship, finishing eighth overall including a win at Oulton Park for Bike Animal Honda.

=== 2008: AIM Yamaha ===
Hutchinson moved to his third different team in three years, signing with Alastair Flanagan's AIM Racing for the 2008 season. Things did not go as planned, and with him lying tenth in the British Supersport Championship, Hutchinson and AIM parted company. He did record two more podiums at the 2008 Isle of Man TT.

=== 2009: Padgett's HRC Honda ===
After an extended off-season, Hutchinson signed for Padgett's Honda for the 2009 season. Hutchinson suffered a disappointing 2009 North West 200 Races, with two sixth places being his best results. However, the 2009 Isle of Man TT has been a different story, with Hutchinson claiming two of the three solo races so far. After a fourth in the rain-delayed opening race on Monday, Hutchinson won both the first race of the Supersport Junior TT and the TT Superstock, setting a lap record in the latter.

At the Senior TT, Hutchinson was heading for a podium finish until he slid off his bike due to oil on the track at Quarterbridge. He lost the chance to win the £10,000 prize money, which was won by Steve Plater. Hutchinson ended up second in the championship standings with 74 points; ten points behind Plater.

The TT results saw Hutchinson given an opportunity by Padgetts in the British Supersport Championship, joining the series at round five. Despite missing the first four rounds, by round eight he was already up to eighth in the championship after four successive top seven finishes, the highlight being third at Mallory Park.

The success continued at the Ulster Grand Prix in August, where Hutchinson won the Superstock race, also smashing the lap record. He also claimed second in the first Supersport race, losing out to race winner Ryan Farquhar by just 0.001 seconds. Hutchinson also finished second and third in the two Superbike races and sixth in the second Supersport race. He also lapped the Dundrod Circuit at more than 133 mph (214 km/h) during the first Superbike race, the fastest lap in the history of the Ulster Grand Prix, with only Conor Cummins recording a quicker lap, when competing at the Dundrod 150.

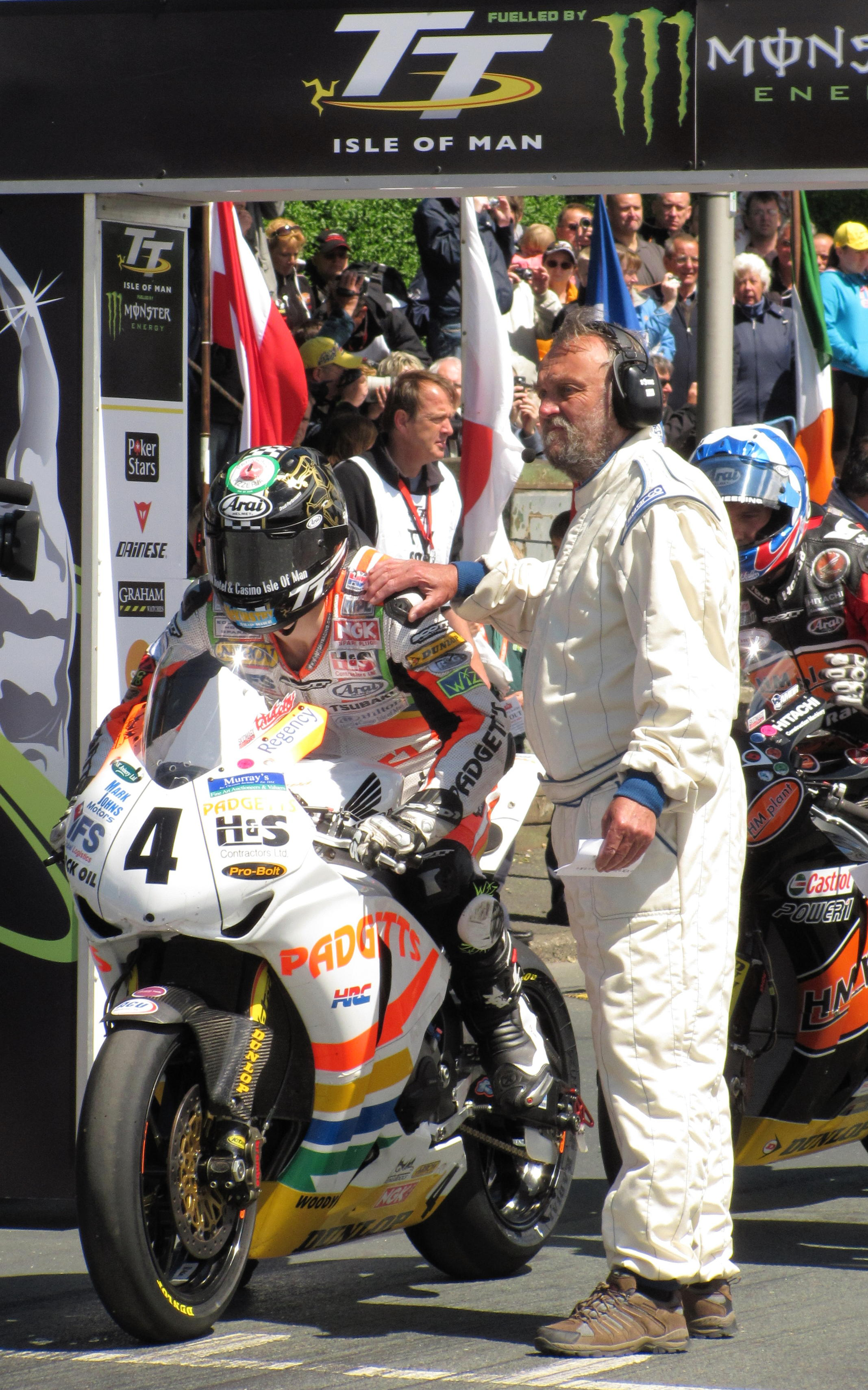
Hutchinson before his record-breaking fifth victory in the 2010 Senior TT with starting official Paul Kermode

=== 2010: Padgett's HRC Honda ===
Hutchinson started the 2010 season as part of a two-bike team for Padgetts Motorcycles in the British Supersport Championship, riding a Honda CBR600RR alongside teammate Glen Richards. Hutchinson went to the Isle of Man TT meeting in June looking to increase his win tally from three and after a decent showing at the North West 200, taking victory in the second Supersport race as well as taking two runner-up placings in the other Supersport race, and also the Superstock race finishing behind Alastair Seeley and Keith Amor respectively.

Hutchinson improved his tally to six victories by taking victories in the first three solo races; the Superbike, Supersport and Superstock TTs, becoming one of the select riders to have achieved three victories in a week at the meeting. In the second Supersport race, Hutchinson equalled the 1996 record of Phillip McCallen by winning his fourth race of the week, edging out Michael Dunlop by 1.5 seconds. He broke the record after completing the clean sweep in a re-run, shortened Senior TT. Hutchinson was running fourth in the first attempt to run the race but was curtailed due to an incident involving Guy Martin. With many of his rivals retiring early on in the re-run, Hutchinson won the race by 37 seconds from Ryan Farquhar.

The next major meeting for Hutchinson was the Ulster Grand Prix at Dundrod. After retiring from the Superbike race at the Dundrod 150 meeting held a few days before the main meeting, Hutchinson was lacking race mileage on his Superbike machine. This did not hinder him as he won the first Superbike race, as well as the first Supersport race and the Superstock race. Hutchinson's final road racing meeting of the season was at the Scarborough Gold Cup meeting at Oliver's Mount, where he won the prestigious Gold Cup race, breaking Guy Martin's streak of winning the race each year since 2003. He also won the David Jefferies Cup for 600cc motorcycles, winning each leg of the race.

One week later, Hutchinson's 2010 season came to an abrupt halt during a British Supersport Championship race at Silverstone. On the first lap of the race held in wet conditions, several riders, including Hutchinson, fell due to the circuit conditions. Hutchinson was then struck by another rider as he lay on the track and suffered compound fractures to his tibia and fibula in his left leg. The injuries ruled him out of the remaining British championship round – despite this, he finished tenth in the championship standings – and also the Macau Grand Prix meeting. Hutchinson had said that he was determined to be fit for the start of the 2011 short circuit season. However, after 16 operations and skin grafts, the injury forced him to miss the start of the season, and ultimately withdrew from both the North West 200 and the Isle of Man TT.

=== 2011: Swan Yamaha ===
Hutchinson signed a two-year deal with Swan Yamaha which covered the 2011 and 2012 seasons.

Set to spearhead Yamaha's road racing campaign as part of their 50th anniversary in 2011, Hutchinson suffered continuous set backs through his ongoing injury. Hutchinson did attend the 2011 Isle of Man TT, during which he rode several exhibition laps of the Mountain Course to widespread acclaim. He did however make a welcome return to the track, when he competed at the Macau Grand Prix in November. Despite being one of the world's most demanding circuits, Hutchinson was on the pace and brought his Swan Yamaha home in third place and led the race for the first two-and-a-half laps.

=== 2012: Swan Yamaha ===
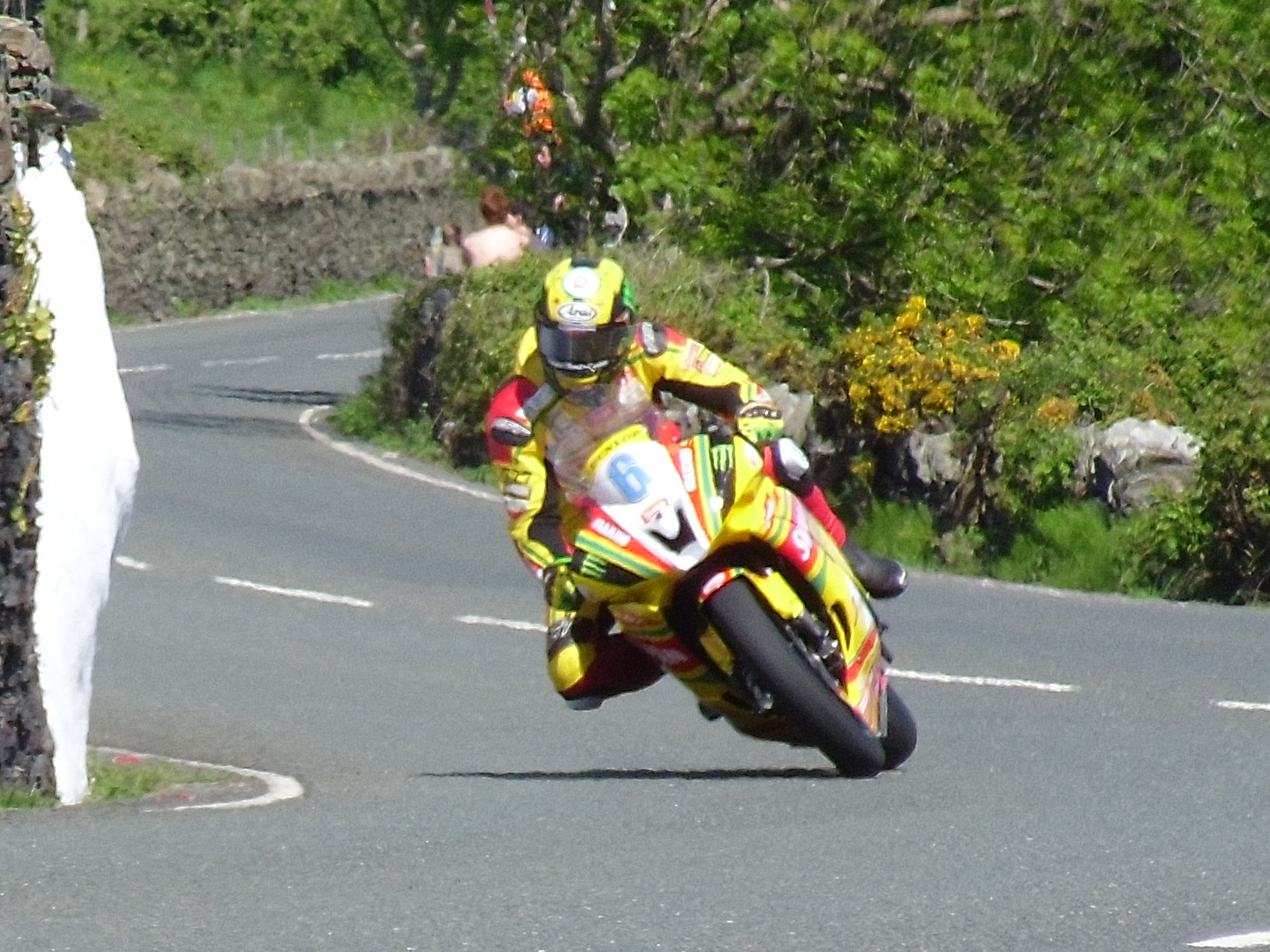
Hutchinson at Tower Bends in the 2012 Supersport TT

Following an off-season which saw him undergo further operations as part of his recuperation, Hutchinson was injured when he twisted his leg while riding an off-road bike in rehearsals for his appearance at the Carole Nash MCN Motorcycle show at Excel in London. This led to reports stating that he would miss the start of the racing season, and importantly both the North West 200 and Isle of Man TT. He had an external fixator fitted and began yet more recuperation in a race against time to be fit to commence his racing campaign.

Hutchinson was passed fit to participate at the North West 200 meeting, and opened his account finishing 10th in the Supersport race one. Hutchinson followed this up with 13th place in the first of the Superbike races, and concluded the meeting finishing in 7th place in the following Superbike race, the North West 200.

Buoyed by his exploits at the North West 200, Hutchinson arrived at the TT for a welcomed return.

Hutchinson's team boss, Shaun Muir, was eager to stress that both Hutchinson and the Swan Yamaha squad were primarily looking at the meeting as a "work in progress," but despite the statement Hutchinson recorded some competitive times during practice week.

Hutchinson made a start to the week's racing by taking 8th place in the opening Superbike race, at an average speed of 123.827 mph.

Hutchinson recorded a ninth-place finish in the first of the two Supersport 600cc races astride the R6 Yamaha, with a race speed of 119.283.

Further solid performances followed, which saw Hutchinson secure 11th place in the Superstock race and 6th place in the second Supersport race, with an improved average race speed of 120.549 mph

The Senior TT was postponed from its traditional Friday slot to the following day due to adverse weather. Following a further appraisal of conditions, it was decided to cancel the 2012 Senior - the only time in its 105-year history when a cancellation has occurred as a consequence of the weather.

=== 2013: Milwaukee Yamaha ===
After the 2012 Isle of Man TT, Hutchinson stepped down from the motorcycle and started his 18-month-long recovery from his nearly career ending injuries. On 26 September 2013, he had his 30th, and hopefully final operation on his badly injured left leg. After that, he went to Donington Park along with his friend, and fellow racer Leon Haslam and made his competitive return to motorcycling testing a Yamaha R1 Superbike for Shaun Muir's Milwaukee Yamaha team. A three-day-long shakedown test followed that at the Circuito de Almería and tested his modified Yamaha R1 for more than 200 laps. Despite planning his racing return for 2014 only, Ian and his Milwaukee Yamaha team filed an entry for the 47th Grand Prix of Macau, but the organizers of the event turned down his entry, because they missed the deadline by 24 hours. Only four days later, on 14 October they allowed Ian to compete in the race. A month later, he grabbed the pole position for the 47th Grand Prix of Macau, beating the most successful rider at the event ever, Michael Rutter by only 0.057 seconds. The sensational comeback didn't stop there as Hutchinson went on to win the Macau GP from Rutter and McGuinness completing one of the most successful comebacks racing fans have seen in recent history.

=== 2014: Milwaukee Yamaha / PBM Kawasaki ===
Hutchinson started out with his old Milwaukee team but parted company, joining Paul Bird Motorsport for a few rounds of Pirelli National Superstock 1000 competition on the Rapid Solicitors Kawasaki team, after which he again competed in the Macau road GP on Shane Byrne's superbike without his previous year's success, overshooting a corner and retiring after a low-speed fall.

=== 2015: PBM / Team Traction Control ===
Hutchinson took a hat trick of victories at the 2015 Isle of Man TT, including two wins in the Monster Energy Supersport class (races 1 & 2) and also a win in the RL360° Superstock Race.

==== PBM Kawasaki ====
Hutchinson re-signed with the Paul Bird outfit for 2015 involving selected BSB rounds and Bird's first foray into racing on closed public roads in UK, entering the North West 200 and Ulster Grand Prix in Northern Ireland and also in the Isle of Man TT races. He finished second behind Bruce Anstey in the 2015 Superbike TT race, but won the Superstock TT on the PBM Kawasaki ZX-10R, his tenth TT victory. In the final race of the week, Hutchinson was placed third in the Senior TT, suffering from reduced power from a cracked exhaust and overshooting at Signpost Corner.

==== Team Traction Control Yamaha ====
Hutchinson was provided with Yamaha YZF-R6 machines for the two TT Supersport races by Team Traction Control, owned by Prodigy front man Keith Flint. Hutchinson won both races, which contributed to his award of the Joey Dunlop championship for 2015. The team's machines were raced in the 2015 British Supersport Championship by James Rispoli and Andy Reid.

=== 2016: Tyco BMW / Team Traction Control Yamaha ===
==== Tyco BMW ====
In late 2015, it was announced that Hutchinson would join TAS BMW Motorrad, campaigning the BMW S1000RR Superbike and the standard BMW S1000RR Superstock for the 2016 season.

==== North West 200 ====
Hutchinson enjoyed early success in the Superstock race at the North West 200, in which he took the TAS BMW S1000RR to first place, with Peter Hickman in second place and Alastair Seeley in third. This was followed up by the runner up place on the podium, behind Michael Dunlop, in the only Superbike race run at the 2016 event.

==== Isle of Man TT ====
Hutchinson and Dunlop arrived on the Isle of Man amongst the favourites to take the honours in the main races at the 2016 Isle of Man TT. A week's worth of fine weather during qualifying, saw Hutchinson power his TAS BMW S1000RR Superstock machine to a new lap record, beating the previous one set by John McGuinness on a Superbike the previous year. However, the time recorded was unofficial as it had been set in practice. The opening Superbike TT race saw Hutchinson and Dunlop at the head of the field from start to finish. Hutchinson trailed Dunlop throughout, although he did manage to record two laps inside the previous course record. Hutchinson eventually finished second to Dunlop by 19.06 seconds after 226 miles of racing.

On Monday 6 June, having secured a win on board the 600 cc Yamaha YZF-R6, Hutchinson made it two wins in a day with victory riding the 1000 cc BMW in Superstock TT. In a race, which he led from the start, Hutchinson broke lap and race records.

On 8 June, Hutchinson also took victory in the second Supersport event of the TT week, his fourth consecutive Supersport win at the 2015 and 2016 TTs, amassing a points-total to win the Joey Dunlop Trophy, a TT Championship, for the second year running.

==== North West 200 ====
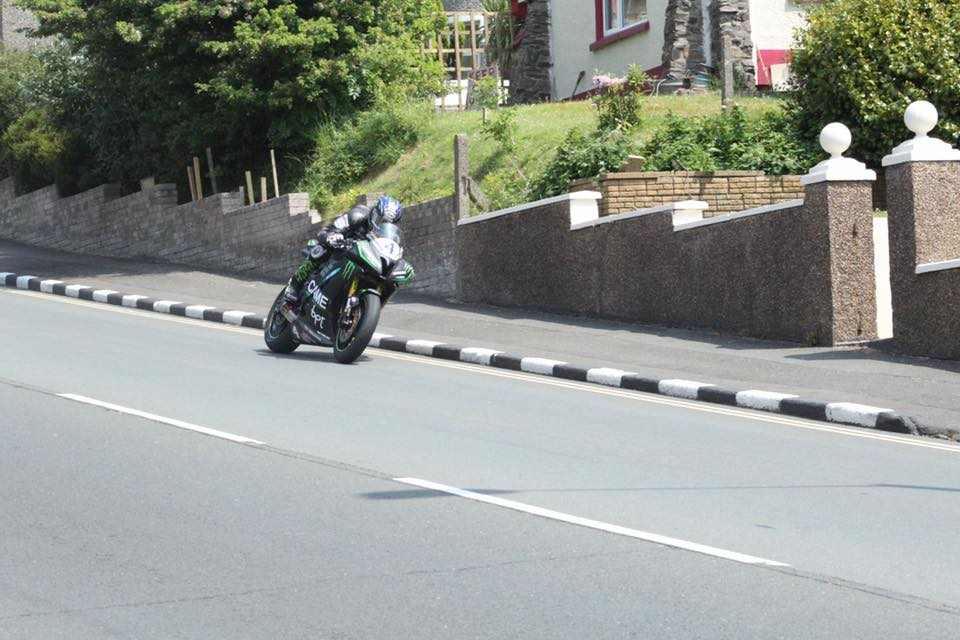
Hutchinson descends Bray Hill on his way to victory in the 2016 Junior TT

For the 2016 season, Hutchinson again campaigned the Yamaha YZF-R6 in the Supersport Class. Hutchinson opened his account at the 2016 North West 200 by taking second place behind Alastair Seeley in the opening Supersport race on the TTC Yamaha YZF-R6.

==== Isle of Man TT ====
At the Isle of Man TT, Hutchinson took the top spot on the podium in the opening Supersport 600 race. In perfect conditions, Hutchinson led the race from start to finish ensuring victory for the team for its second consecutive year.

In the second 600cc outing of the week, the Junior TT, Hutchinson again led the race from start to finish, claiming his 14th TT victory and putting him level on the number of races won with Mike Hailwood.

== Torrens Trophy ==
On Tuesday 12 January 2016, Hutchinson was awarded the Royal Automobile Club's prestigious Torrens Trophy, being one of only eleven recipients in the trophy's history. The award was presented at the RAC's Pall Mall clubhouse in recognition of his outstanding determination, courage and overcoming adversity to win multiple TT's.

=== 2017: Tyco BMW / McAMS Yamaha ===
==== Isle of Man TT ====
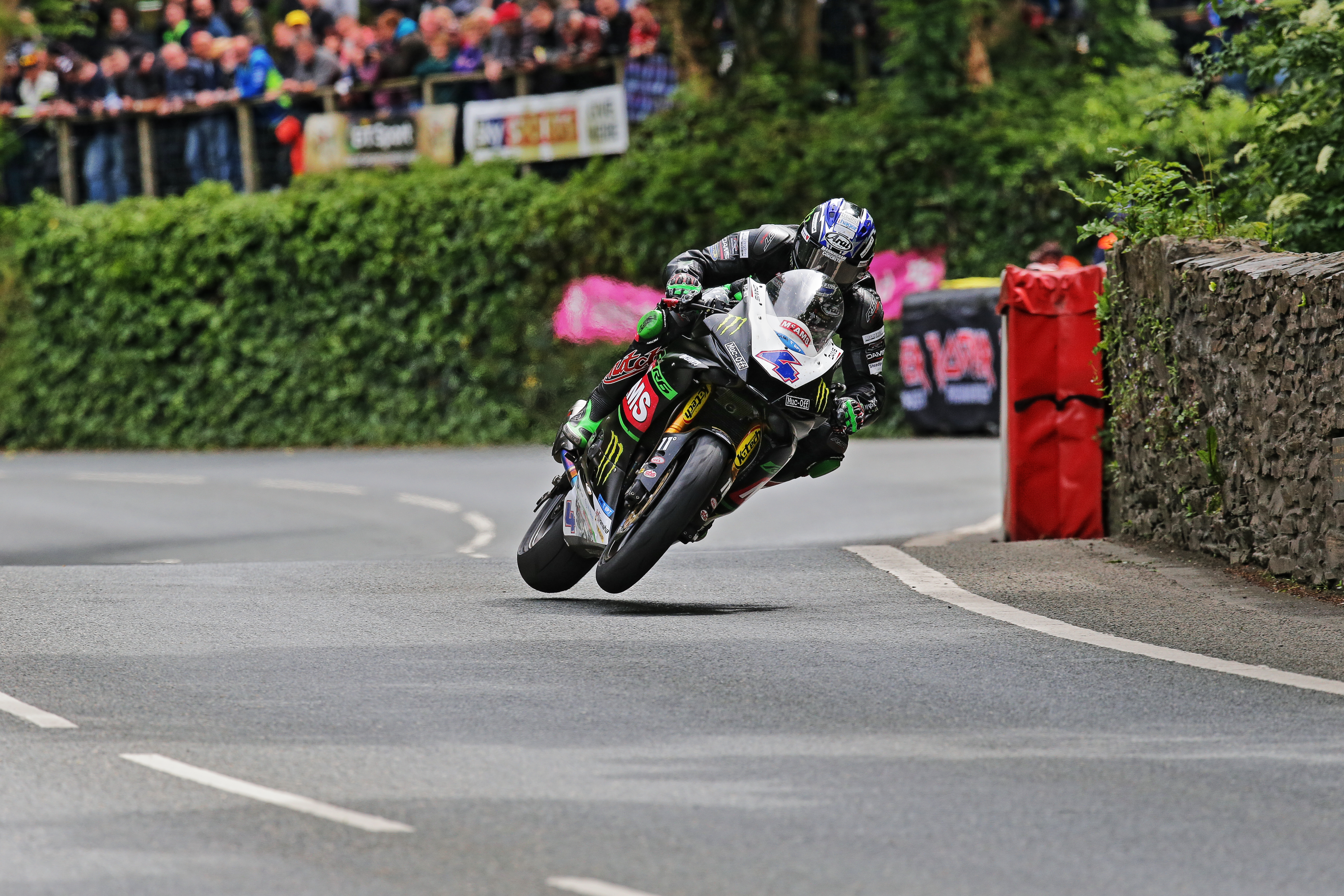
Hutchinson at Union Mills in 2017 Supersport TT race

On 4 June, Hutchinson won the Superbike TT race postponed from 3 June. On 7 June he won the postponed Superstock TT race, his 16th TT victory and 27th podium.

On 9 June, during the Senior TT, Hutchinson crashed on the climb up Snaefell Mountain fracturing his left femur. He remained conscious and dragged himself off the main 'racing line' before the next rider arrived at high speed, close to where Hutchinson had landed in the road.

==== McAMS Yamaha ====
On 5 June, Hutchinson finished fifth in the Supersport TT race.

== Career statistics ==
=== British Superbike Championship ===
==== By year ====
(key) (Races in bold indicate pole position; races in italics indicate fastest lap)

Year	Make	1			2			3			4			5			6			7			8			9			10			11			12			Pos	Pts
Year	Make	R1	R2	R3	R1	R2	R3	R1	R2	R3	R1	R2	R3	R1	R2	R3	R1	R2	R3	R1	R2	R3	R1	R2	R3	R1	R2	R3	R1	R2	R3	R1	R2	R3	R1	R2	R3	Pos	Pts
2014	Yamaha	BHI; 23	BHI; Ret		OUL; 16	OUL; Ret		SNE; 13	SNE; 12		KNO; 18	KNO; 15		BHGP; 18	BHGP; 16		THR; 22	THR; 17		OUL; Ret	OUL; 19	OUL; 19	CAD	CAD		DON	DON		ASS	ASS		SIL	SIL		BHGP	BHGP	BHGP	30th	8

Year	Make	1		2		3			4		5		6			7		8			9			10		11		12			Pos	Pts
Year	Make	R1	R2	R1	R2	R1	R2	R3	R1	R2	R1	R2	R1	R2	R3	R1	R2	R1	R2	R3	R1	R2	R3	R1	R2	R1	R2	R1	R2	R3	Pos	Pts
2015	Kawasaki	DON; 20	DON; 18	BHI; 22	BHI; 25	OUL; 23	OUL; 24		SNE	SNE	KNO	KNO	BHGP	BHGP		THR; 13	THR; 11	CAD	CAD		OUL	OUL	OUL	ASS	ASS	SIL	SIL	BHGP	BHGP	BHGP	27th	8
2016	BMW	SIL	SIL	OUL	OUL	BHI	BHI		KNO	KNO	SNE	SNE	THR	THR		BHGP	BHGP	CAD	CAD		OUL	OUL	OUL	DON	DON	ASS; 25	ASS; 24	BHGP	BHGP	BHGP	NC	0

Year	Bike	1			2			3			4			5			6			Pos	Pts
Year	Bike	R1	R2	R3	R1	R2	R3	R1	R2	R3	R1	R2	R3	R1	R2	R3	R1	R2	R3	Pos	Pts
2020	BMW	DON	DON	DON	SNE	SNE	SNE	SIL	SIL	SIL	OUL	OUL	OUL	DON; 18	DON; Ret	DON; DNS	BHGP	BHGP	BHGP	NC	0

=== British Supersport Championship ===
==== Races by year ====
(key) (Races in bold indicate pole position; races in italics indicate fastest lap)

Year	Bike	1	2	3	4	5	6	7	8	9	10	11	12	Pos	Pts
2009	Honda	BHI	OUL	DON	THR	SNE; 7	KNO; 6	MAL; 3	BHGP; 5	CAD; 8	CRO; 5	SIL; 4	OUL; Ret	6th	78
2010	Honda	BHI; 8	THR; 6	OUL; Ret	CAD; 5	MAL; Ret	KNO; 4	SNE; 11	BHGP; 5	CAD; 5	CRO; Ret	SIL; DNS	OUL	10th	69

Year	Bike	1	2	3	4	5	6	7	8	9	10	11	12	13	14	15	16	17	18	19	20	21	22	Pos	Pts
2022	Yamaha	SIL	SIL	OUL; 16	OUL; 9	DON	DON	KNO	KNO	BRH	BRH	THR	THR	CAD	CAD	SNE	SNE	OUL	OUL	DON	DON	BRH	BRH	29th	9

== Bibliography ==
- Hutchinson, Ian; Macauley, Ted (17 October 2016). Hutchy - Miracle Man: The Autobiography. Valentino Rossi (foreword). John Blake Publishing. ISBN 978-1786061232.

Sporting positions
Preceded by Michael Rutter	Macau Motorcycle Grand Prix winner 2013	Succeeded by Stuart Easton
