= Royal London Group =

British mutual insurance firm

Royal London Mutual Insurance Society Limited
- Trade name: Royal London
- Type: Mutual Society
- Industry: Financial services
- Founded: 1861; 165 years ago
- Headquarters: London, England, UK
- Key people: Barry O'Dwyer (Chief Executive)
- Products: Life assurance, Investment management, Pensions
- Revenue: ▲£11,910 million (2024)
- Operating income: ▼£260 million (2024)
- Net income: ▼£167 million (2024)
- AUM: ▲£199 billion (2026)
- Website: www.royallondon.com

The Royal London Mutual Insurance Society Limited, along with its subsidiaries, is a large mutual insurer and investment company based in London, England.

== History ==
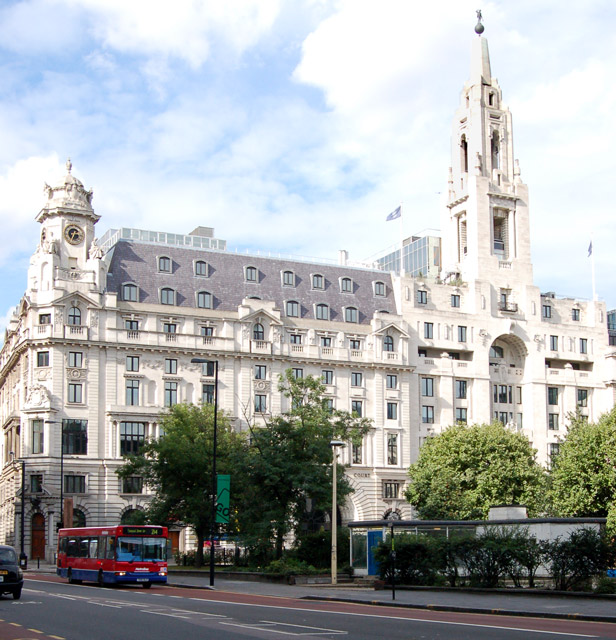
Triton Court (formerly Royal London House) in Finsbury Square: erstwhile headquarters of the Royal London Friendly Society and its successors.

Founded in 1861 by Joseph Degge and Henry Ridge in a London coffee shop, the Royal London Life Insurance and Benefit Society was initially set up as a friendly society dedicated to serving the interest of its members and securing their financial security.

Registered office, London

On 31 December 2000 Royal London took over United Assurance Group plc. The transaction was the largest acquisition of a quoted UK company by a mutual. United Assurance Group itself had been formed by the merger of United Friendly and Refuge Assurance in October 1996.

On 2 October 2000 it was announced that Royal London would acquire Scottish Life, the Edinburgh-based pension specialist.

In March 2003 Royal London launched a new start up protection business, Bright Grey based in Edinburgh.

In May 2008 Royal London concluded a transaction to acquire the open businesses of Resolution. These were the protection businesses Scottish Provident and Scottish Mutual; Phoenix Life Assurance Limited (formerly Abbey National Life) and Scottish Provident International.

At the beginning of 2009 the offshore businesses Scottish Provident International and Scottish Life International were combined to form a new entity, Royal London 360° based in the Isle of Man. This business was subject to a management buyout in November 2013. Royal London 360° rebranded to RL360° soon after the MBO.

In 2010 Royal London announced that it was in talks with Royal Liver Assurance over a possible acquisition. Terms were agreed in 2011 and the delegates of Royal Liver voted for the takeover at their AGM on 12 May 2011 and the transfer was completed on 1 July.

In 2013 The Co-operative Group agreed to sell its life & pensions and asset management businesses to Royal London. The proposed transaction gained the approval of Royal London members at an EGM in June 2013 and gained regulatory approval on 31 July 2013.

At the end of 2015, Royal London completed the rebrand of its two UK protection businesses, Bright Grey and Scottish Provident to a new Royal London protection brand. This completed the group's journey to become a single Royal London brand.

In 2020 Royal London purchased Police Mutual and Forces Mutual. In 2024, Royal London sold them to the Bspoke Group, a specialist insurance group.

== Activities ==
The company is Britain's largest life and pensions mutual in the UK and, as of March 2026, manages £199 billion of savings.
