= Jonathan Asbridge =

English nurse

Sir Jonathan Elliott Asbridge is an English nurse who was the first president of the UK's Nursing and Midwifery Council and a registrant member for England (Nursing).

His first introduction to the caring profession was as a St John Ambulance Cadet at Cardiff Castle Division, Cardiff, South Wales. He studied to be a state registered nurse at the Nightingale School, St Thomas' Hospital, London, and gained a diploma in nursing at Swansea University. He began his career as a staff nurse and charge nurse in critical care, then senior nurse an in-patient manager at Singleton Hospital in 1983 before moving to Addenbrooke's Hospital where, after a period as general manager, he moved into a role of corporate responsibility as director of clinical care service. He was then Chief Nurse at Barts and the Royal London Hospitals. At the end of September 2003 he left this position and took up a new post as National Patient Champion for A&E Experience at the NHS Modernisation Agency. He has also worked at Llandough Hospital and John Radcliffe Hospital in Oxford.

He is a member of the Royal College of Nursing, Amnesty International, and the Standing Nursing and Midwifery Advisory Committee. He was a trustee of the Nurses Welfare Service until its demise in 2007. He is also the senior nursing editor for the Journal of Clinical Evaluation in Practice.

On 17 June 2006 he was given a knighthood in the Queen's Birthday Honours List. He currently is Clinical Director for Sciensus, an independent healthcare provider based in Burton upon Trent.
