= Stuart Easton =

British motorcycle racer (born 1983)

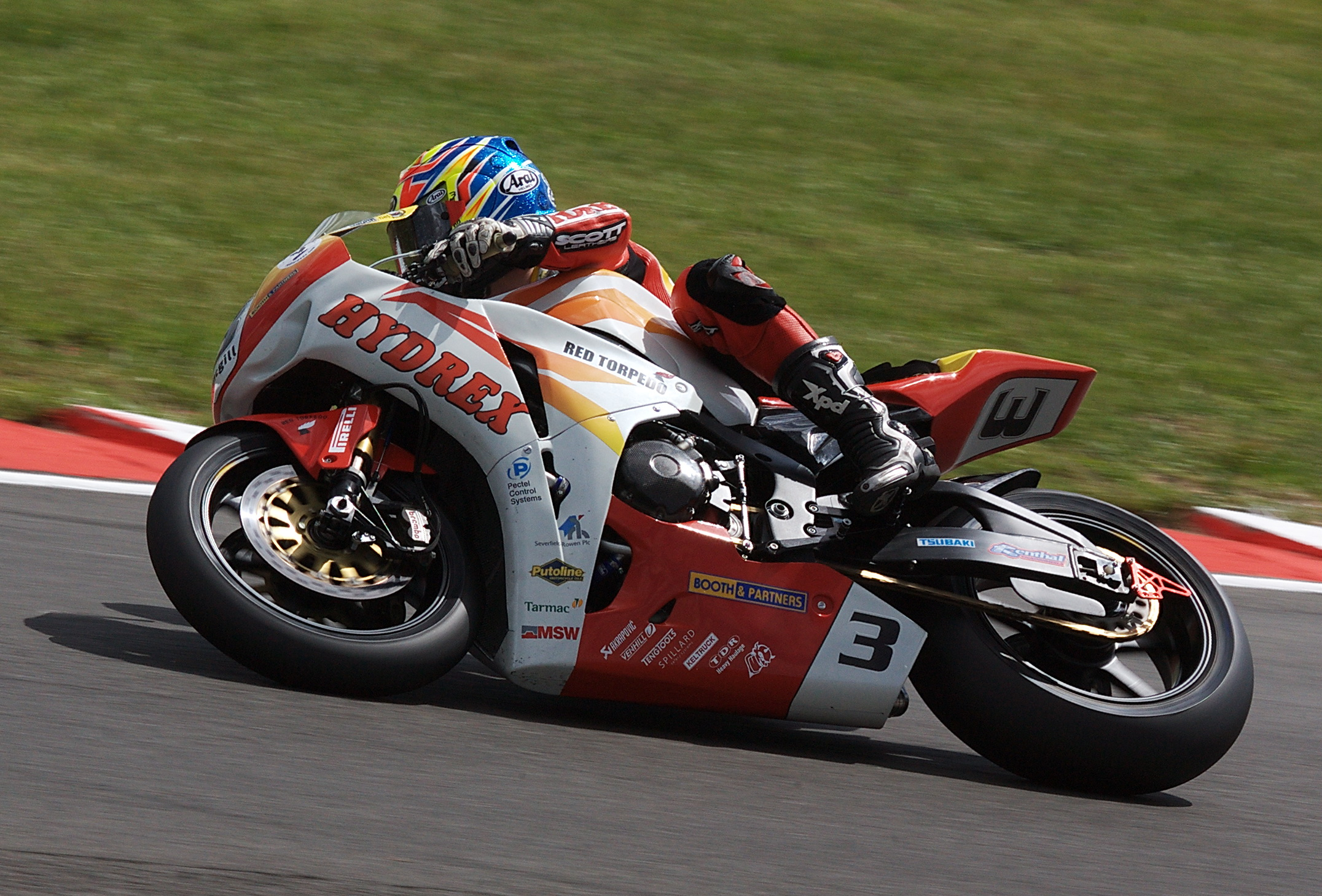
- Stuart Easton riding a Hydrex Honda during the Snetterton 2009 BSB championship
- Born: 21 July 1983 (age 43); Hawick, Scotland
Motorcycle racing career statistics
Superbike World Championship
Active years	2009
Manufacturers	Kawasaki
Championships	0
2009 championship position	N/A
Starts / Wins / Podiums / Poles / F. laps / Points; 2 / 0 / 0 / 0 / 0 / 0

Stuart Easton (born 21 July 1983 in Hawick) is a British former professional motorcycle racer. He announced his retirement from racing in December 2016.

For the first part of 2016, Easton rode in the British Superbike Championship for Tommy Hill's Yamaha team, but was replaced by Broc Parkes from August. For the second part of the 2016 season, Easton intended to race aboard a Ducati 1199 Panigale, but having competed in three events, announced in September that he would miss the last two rounds.

Affectionately known as 'Rat Boy', he won the 2002 British Supersport Championship riding for Paul Bird Motorsport Ducati team. He subsequently rode in the British Superbike Championship on Kawasaki and Hydrex Honda motorcycles, gaining his first Superbike win in 2009 at Croft. He also contested one Superbike World Championship and six Supersport World Championship events.

For 2015, Easton was contracted to ride with the Paul Bird Motorsport Kawasaki squad until November's Macau Grand Prix, but unexpectedly switched to a Yamaha provided by SMT Racing for the race in which he failed to finish.

== Career ==
=== British Supersport 2002–07, 2013 ===
In 2002, Easton took seven wins en route to the Supersport title, finishing ahead of Scott Smart and Michael Laverty. He attempted to defend his title in 2003, taking 3 wins and eventually finishing runner up to future teammate Karl Harris.

In 2004, Easton stepped up to Superbikes in the early part of the season, before returning to Supersport in the later rounds. 2005 saw a return to full-time supersport action, with another pair of wins on the way to third in the championship behind Leon Camier and Craig Jones.

For 2006, it was a mix of British and World Supersport races, again for Ducati, with some strong early results in the domestic series including a win in the first race, and a best finish of sixth at world level. 2007 saw a mix of British Supersport and Superbike rounds, although results were not as strong as in previous seasons.

Easton returned to BSS in 2013 with the Mar-Train Yamaha team, as he had not fully recovered from his road racing injuries and so found it easier to ride a 600 than a Superbike. Easton and Alastair Seeley were the men to beat all year, with Easton taking ten wins to Seeley's seven and winning the championship by 13 points.

=== British Superbikes 2008–2016 ===
Easton progressed full-time to the British Superbike Championship in 2008 joining the MSS Discovery Kawasaki team. He finished that season in 13th place, mainly due to a crash in practice for the fifth round at Snetterton, breaking his wrist and forcing him to sit out the next 4 rounds.

2009 saw Shaun Muir signing him to his Hydrex Honda team for the 2009 British Superbike season alongside Karl Harris. At the first race of the season at Brands Hatch, Easton gained his first ever British Superbike podium finishing third in the first race. Easton continued his good start to the season with a third and a second in the two races of the third round at Donington Park. Round 10 at Croft Circuit saw Easton finally take his and Hydrex Honda's maiden BSB win with a lights to flag victory. Easton took his maiden BSB pole position in the final round of the 2009 season at Oulton Park, and took his second win of the season in Race 1, impressively beating champion Camier on the last lap. He ended the season third in the championship behind the dominant Airwaves Yamahas of Camier and James Ellison.

Maintaining a relationship with Paul Bird Motorsport, who are one of Easton's personal sponsors and who he won the British Supersport title with, he is also a test and development rider for Kawasaki SRT in World Superbikes, and filled in for the injured Broc Parkes at the Assen Round, finishing 18th in Race 1 and retiring in Race 2.

Early speculation for 2010 suggested that Easton will ride for PBM Kawasaki in the World Supersport series, although it was later confirmed he had re-signed with Hydrex Honda for 2010. Team owner Shaun Muir later confirmed that Hydrex had withdrawn their backing for 2010 and that Swan would be taking over title sponsorship, and James Ellison was announced as Easton's teammate. With the departure of Guy Martin, Hydrex Honda's roads race rider, Easton is also expected to return to the North West 200 this year having raced several times in 2006 on a Ducati and 2007 on a Kawasaki.

Easton suffered tissue damage to his leg in a heavy pre-season crash, and was not fully fit for the first two meetings. He took four top-six finishes in those four races however Victory in race one at Oulton Park left him second in the standings, but a poor Cadwell Park meeting dropped him to fifth after four rounds He would ultimately finish the season eighth, with a win and four podiums negated by poor reliability leading to eight DNFs. He will return to the MSS Kawasaki team for 2011, having ridden for them in 2008. He will participate in the official Kawasaki Superbike Racing Team test on the new factory ZX-10R at Sepang in January 2011, partly as a reward for winning the Macau GP. After his NW200 crash ended the 2011 season prematurely, Paul Bird offered Easton a job for 2012, ultimately meaning he will partner Shane Byrne on the Rapid Solicitors Kawasaki as PBM returns to BSB after several years in World Superbikes.

Easton finished tenth in the standing in 2012, clearly not fully recovered from his injuries and returned to Supersport for 2013, winning the title, before rejoining PBM in BSB for 2014. A solid if unspectacular season saw Easton finish seventh, winning the BSB Rider's Cup for the top rider who didn't make the showdown.

Staying with PBM for 2015, Easton took his first BSB win in five years in Race 2 at Oulton Park.

Easton retired from road racing after the 2016 season.

=== Road Racing 2006–2016 ===
Like his mentor Steve Hislop, Easton has combined riding on short circuits with some road racing, beginning in 2006 when he rode for Lloyds British Ducati at the North West 200. He took two top-ten finishes with fourth in the first supersport race and seventh in the second. Returning in 2007 riding for MSS Kawasaki, he competed in the superbike and supersport races, taking a best finish of seventh in the second supersport race. He returned in 2010 riding this time for his Swan Honda BSB team, setting a new fastest speed of 204 mph through the speed trap during practice. Race results were his best to date, taking fifth and second in the two superbike races respectively.

Easton's greatest success on the roads has come at the Macau Grand Prix. Making his debut in 2008 for Doosan Honda he won the race after starting sixth. He successfully defended the title in 2009, riding for Hydrex IGT Honda, having also taken pole position and broken the lap record. After an inconsistent season in BSB in 2010 he rode the WSBK spec Kawasaki ZX-10R for Paul Bird's team and took a third successive victory ahead of pole sitter and six-time winner Rutter.

As yet, Easton has not competed at the Isle of Man TT but acted as a member of the pit crew for his close friend Michael Rutter in 2009. He was set to ride Hislop's classic 1992 Rotary Norton in the 2011 Parade Lap on the day of the Senior TT.

However, on 19 May 2011, while in free practice for the North West 200, Easton crashed with teammate Gary Mason at Station Corner. Mason was fine but Easton sustained heavy injuries including a shattered pelvis, broken femur, broken bones in his hands and a dislocated hip, this was confirmed via Cal Crutchlow's Twitter page. There is also a suspected bowel injury. However, later it was confirmed that Easton had broken both femurs, shattered his pelvis in five places, broke his coccyx, ruptured his bowel, broke some fingers and had a deep cut on his arm. It was said that Easton's recovery time would be approximately one year.

Easton returned to the roads at the Macau Grand Prix in 2014, and once again dominated the race to take his fourth win at the Guia Circuit, in four successive appearances having won in 2008, 2009 and 2010 and missing 2011, 12 and 13.

== Personal ==
Easton's first child, a boy christened Finley Stuart, was born in September 2009.

== Career statistics ==
Stats correct as of 9 July 2012

=== All Time ===
Series	Years active	Races	Poles	Podiums	**Wins**	**2nd place**	**3rd place**	Fast Laps	Titles
125 GP	^{2000}	1	0	0	0	0	0	0	0
250 GP	^{2001}	1	0	0	0	0	0	0	0
British Superbike (BSB)	^{2008-Pres}	82	1	20	3	8	9	0	0
World Superbike (SBK)	^{2009}	2	0	0	0	0	0	0	0
Total		89	1	20	3	8	9	0	0

=== By championship ===
==== 125 GP ====
Year	Make	1	2	3	4	5	6	7	8	9	10	11	12	13	14	15	16	Pos	Pts	Ref
2000	Honda	RSA	MAL	JPN	ESP	FRA	ITA	CAT	NED	GBR; 20	GER	CZE	POR	VAL	BRA	PAC	AUS	NC	0	

==== 250 GP ====
Year	Make	1	2	3	4	5	6	7	8	9	10	11	12	13	14	15	16	Pos	Pts	Ref
2001	Honda	JPN	RSA	ESP	FRA	ITA	CAT	NED	GBR; Ret	GER	CZE	POR	VAL	PAC	AUS	MAL	BRA	NC	0	

==== British Supersport Championship ====
Year	Make	1	2	3	4	5	6	7	8	9	10	11	12	13	Pos	Pts	Ref
2002	Ducati	SIL; Ret	BHI; 1	DON; **1**	OUL; **1**	SNE; **1**	BHGP; **1**	ROC; 2	KNO; Ret	THR; 4	CAD; 2	OUL; 1	MAL; 3	DON; **Ret**	**1st**	**199**	
2004	Ducati	SIL	BHI	SNE	OUL	MON	SNE	BHGP	KNO	MAL; 14	CRO; 8	CAD; 3	OUL; 6	DON; Ret	16th	36	
2005	Ducati	BHI; 2	THR; 2	MAL; 7	OUL; 20	MON; 5	CRO; 1	KNO; 2	SNE; Ret	SIL; 6	CAD; Ret	OUL; 6	DON; 5	BHGP; 1	**3rd**^{1}	**161**	

===== Notes =====
1. Both Easton and Cal Crutchlow finished on 161 thus sharing 3rd place.

==== World Supersport Championship ====
Yr	Class	Team	QAT (Qatar)	AUS (Australia)	ESP (Spain)	ITA (Italy)	EUR (European Union)	SMR (San Marino)	CZE (Czech Republic)	GBR (United Kingdom)	NED (Netherlands)	GER (Germany)	ITA (Italy)	FRA (France)	Pos	Pts	Ref
2006	WSS	Ducati	Ret	Ret	Ret	6	15		Ret	Ret	10	11	14	14	18th	26	

==== British Superbike Championship ====
(key) (Races in bold indicate pole position; races in italics indicate fastest lap)

Year	Bike	1		2		3		4		5		6		7		8		9		10		11		12		13		Pos	Pts	Ref
Year	Bike	R1	R2	R1	R2	R1	R2	R1	R2	R1	R2	R1	R2	R1	R2	R1	R2	R1	R2	R1	R2	R1	R2	R1	R2	R1	R2	Pos	Pts	Ref
2004	Ducati	SIL; 11	SIL; 7	BHI	BHI	SNE	SNE	OUL; Ret	OUL; Ret	MON; Ret	MON; 14	THR; 15	THR; 12	BHGP	BHGP	KNO	KNO	MAL	MAL	CRO	CRO	CAD	CAD	OUL	OUL	DON	DON	23rd	21	

Year	Make	1		2		3			4		5		6			7			8			9			10		11		12			Pos	Pts	Ref
Year	Make	R1	R2	R1	R2	R1	R2	R3	R1	R2	R1	R2	R1	R2	R3	R1	R2	R3	R1	R2	R3	R1	R2	R3	R1	R2	R1	R2	R1	R2	R3	Pos	Pts	Ref
2008	Kawasaki	THR; 9	THR; 6	OUL; 10	OUL; 5	BHGP; 7	BHGP; 7		DON; 11	DON; 11	SNE	SNE	MAL	MAL		OUL	OUL		KNO	KNO		CAD; Ret	CAD; 14		CRO; 15	CRO; 13	SIL; 8	SIL; 11	BHI; Ret	BHI; Ret		13th	81	
2009	Honda	BHI; 3	BHI; 4	OUL; 4	OUL; Ret	DON; 3	DON; 2		THR; 3	THR; 4	SNE; 2	SNE; 4	KNO; 2	KNO; 4		MAL; Ret	MAL; Ret		BHGP; 3	BHGP; 3	BHGP; 4	CAD; 2	CAD; 2		CRO; 1	CRO; 2	SIL; 4	SIL; 4	OUL; 1	OUL; 2	OUL; Ret	**3rd**	**374**	
2010	Honda	BHI; 6	BHI; 5	THR; 4	THR; 3	OUL; 1	OUL; Ret		CAD; Ret	CAD; 10	MAL; 5	MAL; Ret	KNO; 19	KNO; C		SNE; Ret	SNE; 8	SNE; Ret	BHGP; Ret	BHGP; 7	BHGP; 8	CAD; 10	CAD; 11		CRO; 3	CRO; 3	SIL; 17	SIL; Ret	OUL; 7	OUL; 2	OUL; Ret	9th	189	
2011	Kawasaki	BHI; 4	BHI; 6	OUL; 3	OUL; 2	CRO; 6	CRO; 2		THR	THR	KNO	KNO	SNE	SNE		OUL	OUL		BHGP	BHGP		CAD	CAD	CAD	DON	DON	SIL	SIL	BHGP	BHGP		18th	69†	
2012	Kawasaki	BHI; Ret	BHI; C	THR; 5	THR; 4	OUL; 9	OUL; 5	OUL; 3	SNE; Ret	SNE; 8	KNO	KNO	OUL; WD	OUL; WD	OUL; WD	BHGP	BHGP		CAD	CAD		DON	DON		ASS	ASS	SIL	SIL	BHGP	BHGP	BHGP	12th*	66*	

Year	Make	1			2			3			4			5			6			7			8			9			10			11			12			Pos	Pts
Year	Make	R1	R2	R3	R1	R2	R3	R1	R2	R3	R1	R2	R3	R1	R2	R3	R1	R2	R3	R1	R2	R3	R1	R2	R3	R1	R2	R3	R1	R2	R3	R1	R2	R3	R1	R2	R3	Pos	Pts
2014	Kawasaki	BHI; 6	BHI; 6		OUL; 5	OUL; 4		SNE; Ret	SNE; 13		KNO; 3	KNO; 5		BHGP; 10	BHGP; 14		THR; 16	THR; 7		OUL; 9	OUL; 6	OUL; 5	CAD; 9	CAD; Ret		DON; 5	DON; 4		ASS; 3	ASS; 6		SIL; 5	SIL; 6		BHGP; 6	BHGP; 5	BHGP; 4	7th	231

Year	Make	1		2		3			4		5		6			7		8			9			10		11		12			Pos	Pts
Year	Make	R1	R2	R1	R2	R1	R2	R3	R1	R2	R1	R2	R1	R2	R3	R1	R2	R1	R2	R3	R1	R2	R3	R1	R2	R1	R2	R1	R2	R3	Pos	Pts
2015	Kawasaki	DON; 11	DON; 3	BHI; 6	BHI; 5	OUL; 4	OUL; 1		SNE; 7	SNE; 6	KNO; 2	KNO; 2	BHGP; Ret	BHGP; DNS		THR	THR	CAD	CAD		OUL; DNS	OUL; DNS	OUL; DNS	ASS; DNS	ASS; DNS	SIL	SIL	BHGP	BHGP	BHGP	11th	139
2016	Yamaha/Ducati	SIL; Ret	SIL; Ret	OUL; 17	OUL; 10	BHI; 14	BHI; 9		KNO; 17	KNO; 14	SNE; 9	SNE; 16	THR; Ret	THR; DNS		BHGP	BHGP	CAD; 21	CAD; 20		OUL; 15	OUL; 16	OUL; 16	DON; Ret	DON; 14	ASS	ASS	BHGP	BHGP	BHGP	22nd	27

- * Season still in progress

===== Notes =====
- † Easton's two sixth places were discounted from the points tally as the rules stated that a rider's two worst results would be dropped.

=== World Superbike Championship ===
Year	Make	1		2		3		4		5		6		7		8		9		10		11		12		13		14		Pos	Pts	Ref
Year	Make	R1	R2	R1	R2	R1	R2	R1	R2	R1	R2	R1	R2	R1	R2	R1	R2	R1	R2	R1	R2	R1	R2	R1	R2	R1	R2	R1	R2	Pos	Pts	Ref
2009	Kawasaki	AUS	AUS	QAT	QAT	SPA	SPA	NED; 18	NED; Ret	ITA	ITA	RSA	RSA	USA	USA	SMR	SMR	GBR	GBR	CZE	CZE	GER	GER	ITA	ITA	FRA	FRA	POR	POR	NC	0	

Sporting positions
Preceded by Steve Plater	Macau Motorcycle Grand Prix Winner; 2008–2010	Succeeded by Michael Rutter
Preceded by Ian Hutchinson	Macau Motorcycle Grand Prix Winner; 2014	Succeeded by Peter Hickman
