= Sciensus =

Sciensus Pharma Services Limited
- Founded: October 28, 1992; 33 years ago
- Founder: Charles Anthony Walsh
- Headquarters: London, England
- Key people: Gordon Cox (Interim CEO) Sir Jonathan Asbridge (CCO)
- Parent: Halcyon Topco Limited
- Subsidiaries: Sciensus Logistics Limited
- Website: sciensus.com

Sciensus Pharma Services Limited is a global life sciences business established in 1992 by founder and former chairman Charles Walsh based in London.

The company supplies a wide range of specialist medications and patient support programmes for chronic, cancer and rare disease patients, with around 1,600 employees dealing with more than 230,000 patients a year. It works with every NHS trust in the UK.

In Spring 2015, Healthcare at Home reverted to using in house logistics rather than working with a third party for all deliveries.

In Autumn 2015, the company went through a full corporate rebranding, including new logos, literature, strap line and website in an attempt to re-establish the company's status in the market.

The company's name was changed in 2022 from "Healthcare at Home LTD" to "Sciensus Pharma Limited", using only "Sciensus" to refer to themselves from then on.

In July 2023, 1 patient died and 3 were hospitalised after being administered unlicensed versions of cabazitaxel chemotherapy provided by Sciensus. This follows reports in May 2023 of complaints of poor service and delays raised about the company, sparking a possible CQC review. This resulted in "partial suspension" of its licence by the Medicines and Healthcare products Regulatory Agency (MHRA).

== History ==
In 2013 Healthcare at Home took over almost 3,000 patients from another drug delivery company, Medco Health Solutions which pulled out of the UK market. Subsequently, the company struggled to maintain services. In March 2014 Healthcare at Home said that it was no longer accepting new ‘high risk’ patients such as those suffering from haemophilia or respiratory diseases like cystic fibrosis because it could not guarantee getting their drugs to them on time or in full. The company blamed IT issues and a ‘system failure’ relating to the firm's outsourcing of its logistics and warehousing departments. Dave Roberts, chief executive of the National Clinical Homecare Association, says there are questions about whether the rapid growth and low profit margins in the sector have contributed to the situation. ‘There’s been 20% growth in this sector year on year for several years now in terms of numbers of patients – that’s a very rapid expansion. But profits in this sector are just 2-4%. That is a poor return given the extent of capital investment needed and the governance and logistics issues. As NHS budgets have fallen, all the slack has been cut out of contracts,’ Roberts added.

In its 2014 accounts Healthcare at Home, which is majority-owned by private equity firm Vitruvian Partners, reported a turnover of £1bn, with pretax profits of just £15m.

The chief executive Mike Gordon stepped down in June 2014 after the revelation that seven per cent of the firm's 150,000 patients had not received their medication on time or in full during the last six months.

In May 2021 it was reported that the firm had missed almost 10,000 medicine deliveries when it introduced a new IT system in October 2020 and it was put in special measures by the Care Quality Commission. The inspectors found they failed to properly investigate some health and safety incidents and "did not always learn lessons when things went wrong".

On 16 October 2023, Sciensus were given 28 days to reform the firm's complaints handling process due to issues around ignoring patients concerns. The CEO of Sciencus received a written warning from the Rob Behrens, Parliamentary and Health Service Ombudsman.
