= 2010 Ulster Grand Prix =

Motorcycle race in Northern Ireland

(United Kingdom) 2010 Ulster Grand Prix
Race details
Date	9–14 August 2010
Location	Dundrod Circuit, County Antrim, Northern Ireland
Course	Road Course; 7.401 mi (11.911 km)

2010 Ulster Grand Prix races were held on the Dundrod Circuit between 9–14 August 2010 in County Antrim, Northern Ireland.

== Practice Times ==
=== Practice Times & Leaderboard UGP Superbike Class ===
Rank	Rider	Wed 11 Aug	Thurs 12 Aug
1	(England) Ian Hutchinson; 1000cc Honda	3' 27.689; 128.288 mph	3' 23.384; 131.003 mph
2	(New Zealand) Bruce Anstey; 1000cc Suzuki	3' 33.713; 124.672 mph	3' 23.971; 130.626 mph
3	(Australia) Cameron Donald; 1000cc Suzuki	3' 30.9459; 126.308 mph	3' 24.571; 130.243 mph
4	(Northern Ireland) Ryan Farquhar; 1000cc Kawasaki	3' 25.251; 129.812 mph	—— No Time
5	(Scotland) Keith Amor; 1000cc BMW	3' 27.049; 128.684 mph	3' 25.494; 129.658 mph
6	(England) Guy Martin; 1000cc Honda	4' 46.401; 93.030 mph	3' 26.083; 129.288 mph
7	(Northern Ireland) Michael Dunlop; 1000cc Honda	3' 26.544; 128.999 mph	3' 26.115; 129.267 mph
8	(Wales) Ian Lougher; 1000cc Kawasaki	—— No Time	3' 26.380; 129.096 mph
9	(England) James McBride; 1000cc Yamaha	3' 33.124; 125.016 mph	3' 28.683; 127.677 mph
10	(England) Gary Johnson; 1000cc Suzuki	3' 34.864; 124.004 mph	3' 29.242; 127.336 mph

== Race results ==
=== Race 1; 2010 1000cc Superstock race final standings ===
Saturday 14 August 2010 5 laps – 37.005 miles (Reduced Race Distance) Dundrod Circuit

Rank	Rider	Team	Time	Speed
1	(England) Ian Hutchinson	Honda 1000cc	16:59.711	130.204 mph
2	(Scotland) Keith Amor	BMW 1000cc	+ 0.268	130.170 mph
3	(Northern Ireland) Ryan Farquhar	Kawasaki 1000cc	+ 8.831	129.086 mph
4	(Wales) Ian Lougher	Kawasaki 1000cc	+ 8.954	129.071 mph
5	(England) Gary Johnson	Suzuki 1000cc	+ 9.069	129.056 mph
6	(England) Guy Martin	Honda 1000cc	+ 17.600	127.995 mph
7	(England) James McBride	Yamaha 1000cc	+ 18.404	127.896 mph
8	(Northern Ireland) Michael Dunlop	Honda 1000cc	+ 18.597	127.872 mph
9	(Northern Ireland) William Dunlop	Suzuki 1000cc	+ 18.951	127.828 mph
10	(Scotland) Mark Buckley	Kawasaki 1000cc	+ 30.641	126.406 mph

Fastest Lap and new lap record: Ian Hutchinson, 3' 21.599 131.599 mph on lap 4

=== Race 2; 2010 600cc Supersport race final standings ===
Saturday 14 August 2010 6 laps – 44.406 miles Dundrod Circuit

Rank	Rider	Team	Time	Speed
1	(England) Ian Hutchinson	Honda 600cc	20:59.437	126.576 mph
2	(Scotland) Keith Amor	Honda 600cc	+ 0.176	126.558 mph
3	(Northern Ireland) Michael Dunlop	Yamaha 600cc	+ 0.424	126.533 mph
4	(England) Guy Martin	Honda 600cc	+ 9.415	125.027 mph
5	(New Zealand) Bruce Anstey	Suzuki 600cc	+ 18.845	124.612 mph
6	(Northern Ireland) Ryan Farquhar	Kawasaki 600cc	+ 20.040	124.593 mph
7	(Isle of Man) Dan Kneen	Yamaha 600cc	+ 27.639	123.858 mph
8	(Northern Ireland) Michael Pearson	Kawasaki 600cc	+ 34.853	123.168 mph
9	(England) Olie Linsdell	Yamaha 600cc	+ 34.953	123.158 mph
10	(England) James McBride	Kawasaki 600cc	+ 43.450	122.355 mph

Fastest Lap: Michael Dunlop, 3' 27.187 128.599 mph on lap 6

=== Race 3a; 2010 250cc Combined Race final standings ===
Saturday 14 August 2010 6 laps – 44.406 miles Dundrod Circuit

Rank	Rider	Team	Time	Speed
1	(Wales) Ian Lougher	Honda 250cc	22:22.159	118.775 mph
2	(Northern Ireland) William Dunlop	Honda 250cc	+ 10.052	117.892 mph
3	(Northern Ireland) Paul Robinson	Honda 250cc	+ 29.194	116.246 mph
4	(England) Daley Mathison	Honda 250cc	+ 50.229	114.490 mph
5	(Northern Ireland) Davy Morgan	Honda 250cc	+ 50.331	114.482 mph
6	(England) Paul Shoesmith	Honda 250cc	+ 1:30.721	111.255 mph
7	(England) Kevin Strowger	Honda 250cc	+ 1:30.851	111.244 mph
8	(Wales) Paul Owen	Honda 250cc	+ 1:31.051	111.229 mph
9	(Northern Ireland) Nigel Moore	Honda 250cc	+ 1:32.274	111.134 mph
10	(Northern Ireland) Victor Gilmour	Honda 250cc	+ 1:43.969	110.235 mph

Fastest Lap: Ian Lougher, 3' 41.807 120.122 mph on lap 3

=== Race 4; 2010 1000cc Superbike Race 1 final standings ===
Saturday 14 August 2010 6 laps – 44.406 miles Dundrod Circuit

Rank	Rider	Team	Time	Speed
1	(England) Ian Hutchinson	Honda 1000cc	20:11.488	131.586 mph
2	(New Zealand) Bruce Anstey	Suzuki 1000cc	+ 0.106	131.574 mph
3	(Scotland) Keith Amor	BMW 1000cc	+ 0.422	131.540 mph
4	(England) Guy Martin	Honda 1000cc	+ 1.232	131.452 mph
5	(Northern Ireland) Michael Dunlop	Honda 1000cc	+ 2.479	131.317 mph
6	(England) Gary Johnson	Suzuki 1000cc	+ 9.852	130.524 mph
7	(England) James McBride	Yamaha 1000cc	+ 32.006	128.199 mph
8	(Wales) Ian Lougher	Kawasaki 1000cc	+ 32.775	128.120 mph
9	(Isle of Man) Dan Kneen	Suzuki 1000cc	+ 33.114	128.085 mph
10	(Northern Ireland) Stephen Thompson	Suzuki 1000cc	+ 51.237	126.237 mph

Fastest Lap: Keith Amor, 3' 20.016 133.209 mph on lap 5

=== Race 5; 2010 600cc Supersport race 2 final standings (Combined Result) ===
Saturday 14 August 2010 6 laps – 44.406 miles Dundrod Circuit

Rank	Rider	Team	Time	Speed
1	(Scotland) Keith Amor	Honda 600cc	20:58.465	126.317 mph
2	(England) Ian Hutchinson	Honda 600cc	+ 0.210	126.296 mph
3	(Northern Ireland) William Dunlop	Yamaha 600cc	+ 0.664	126.250 mph
4	(Northern Ireland) Michael Dunlop	Yamaha 600cc	+ 0.499	125.887 mph
5	(England) Guy Martin	Honda 600cc	+ 14.643	124.864 mph
6	(Isle of Man) Dan Kneen	Yamaha 600cc	+ 27.373	123.628 mph
7	(England) Olie Linsdell	Yamaha 600cc	+ 28.022	123.565 mph
8	(England) James McBride	Yamaha 600cc	+ 40.065	122.419 mph
8	(Scotland) Mark Buckley	Kawasaki 600cc	+ 50.846	121.411 mph
9	(Republic of Ireland) Derek Brien	Yamaha 600cc	+ 59.682	120.597 mph

Fastest Lap: Ian Hutchinson, 3' 079 128.047 mph on lap 3 – Part 1

=== Race 6; 2010 1000cc Superbike Race 2 final standings ===
Saturday 14 August 2010 5 laps – 37.005 miles Dundrod Circuit

Rank	Rider	Team	Time	Speed
1	(New Zealand) Bruce Anstey	Suzuki 1000cc	16:45.615	132.029 mph
2	(England) Ian Hutchinson	Honda 1000cc	+ 0.072	132.020 mph
3	(Scotland) Keith Amor	BMW 1000cc	+ 0.335	131.985 mph
4	(Australia) Cameron Donald	Suzuki 1000cc	+ 1.155	131.878 mph
5	(England) Guy Martin	Honda 1000cc	+ 1.692	131.807 mph
6	(Northern Ireland) Michael Dunlop	Honda 1000cc	+ 9.886	130.744 mph
7	(England) Gary Johnson	Suzuki 1000cc	+ 10.618	130.650 mph
8	(Wales) Ian Lougher	Kawasaki 1000cc	+ 27.866	128.469 mph
9	(Northern Ireland) William Dunlop	Suzuki 1000cc	+ 28.156	128.433 mph
10	(Northern Ireland) Michael Pearson	Kawasaki 1000cc	+ 29.596	128.255 mph

Fastest Lap and New Outright Course Record: Bruce Anstey, 3' 18.870 133.977 mph on lap 5

== See also ==
- North West 200
- Isle of Man TT
- Manx Grand Prix
