= Vitruvian Partners =

European private equity firm

- Company type: Private
- Industry: Private Equity
- Founded: 2006; 20 years ago
- Founders: Founding Partners: Ian Riley (Advisory Partner), Michael Risman, Toby Wyles (Retired) Mark Harford (Retired), David Nahama.
- Headquarters: London, United Kingdom / Munich, Germany / Stockholm, Sweden / Luxembourg, Luxembourg / Madrid, Spain / Miami, United States / Mumbai, India / Shanghai, China / Singapore, Singapore / San Francisco, United States
- Key people: Joined founding team: Stephen Byrne, Ben Johnson, Jussi Wuoristo
- Products: Leveraged buyouts and growth capital
- Total assets: VIP I: €925 million, VIP II: £1 billion, VIP III: €2.4 billion, VIP IV: €4 billion, VIP V: €7.3 billion.
- Number of employees: >200
- Website: www.vitruvianpartners.com

Vitruvian Partners is a global private equity firm, focusing on growth buyout and growth capital investments in middle-market companies.

Vitruvian invests throughout Europe, the U.S. and Asia. The firm has offices in London, Munich, Madrid, Miami, Mumbai, Stockholm, Shanghai, Singapore, San Francisco and Luxembourg.

The firm was founded in 2006 by former partners of Apax Partners, BC Partners and Bridgepoint Capital. In 2008, Vitruvian completed the fundraising for its inaugural €925 million fund, the Vitruvian Investment Partnership I ("VIP I"). In December 2013, Vitruvian announced that it had closed the fundraising of its second fund, Vitruvian Investment Partnership II (“VIP II”), at its self-imposed cap of £1 billion ($1.6 billion; €1.2billion). In June 2017, Vitruvian announced that it had closed the fundraising of its third fund, Vitruvian Investment Partnership III (“VIP III”), at the hard cap of €2.4 billion. In July 2020 Vitruvian announced the closing of Vitruvian Investment Partnership IV (“VIP IV”) at the hard cap of €4.0 billion. In September 2024 Vitruvian announced the closing of Vitruvian Investment Partnership V ("VIP V") at the hard cap of €7.3 billion.

In an annual study of the long-term performance conducted by Dow Jones/HEC Vitruvian was ranked in the Top 1% of GPs (General Partners) globally for the third year running.

== Investments ==
Company	Fund	Date Invested	Date Sold	Headquarters	Description
Tinopolis	VIP I	Jul-08	Oct-17	United Kingdom	Independent TV production house
Callcredit	VIP I	Dec-09	Feb-14	United Kingdom	Provider of credit reference and marketing
Inspired Gaming	VIP I	Jul-10	Jul-16	United Kingdom	Land-based gaming products to licensed betting shops, bingo operators and casinos
Openbet	VIP I	Jan-11	Apr-16	United Kingdom	Online gaming and betting
Verastar (pka Unicom)	VIP I	Apr-11		United Kingdom	Reseller of business services to the UK micro SME market
Group IMD (pka Independent Media Distribution)	VIP I	May-11	Sep-16	United Kingdom	TV & Radio advertising & digital media
Benify (pka Flexpay)	VIP I	Jun-11		Sweden	employee engagement software
Instinctif Partners (pka College Group)	VIP I	Oct-11	Sept-19	United Kingdom	Business communications consultancy headquartered in London and with offices on five continents
Healthcare at Home	VIP I	Feb-12		United Kingdom	Provider of clinical and pharmaceutical services to patients in homes
Just Eat	VIP I	Apr-12	IPO Mar-14	United Kingdom / Denmark	online takeaway ordering service. Floated on the London Stock Exchange in April 2014
Snow Software	VIP II	Jul-12	Partial Realisation Apr-17	Sweden	Software asset management
Inenco Group	VIP I	Sep-13		United Kingdom	strategic energy management
RL360°	VIP I	Nov-13		Isle of Man	Specialist international life assurance provider
Linimed-Fazmed	VIP II	Mar-14	Jul-18	Germany	ambulatory outpatient intensive care services in the eastern part of Germany
Farfetch	VIP II	Apr-14		United Kingdom	Online market place for fashion boutiques
JacTravel	VIP II	Jul-14	Sep-17	United Kingdom	B2B hotel room marketplace
Solvinity (pka ASP4all Bitbrains)	VIP II	Jul-14		Netherlands	managed hosting and cloud services
CRF Health	VIP II	Jan-15		Finland / United States of America	Leading provider of electronic Clinical Outcomes Assessment (“eCOA”) for clinical trials
Trustpilot	VIP II	May-15		Denmark / United States	Global, multi-language open review community
Voxbone	VIP II	Aug-15		Belgium	Cloud-based provider of international voice over internet protocol (VoIP) services
Ebury	VIP II	Nov-15		United Kingdom	Currency and lending to European SMEs
Accountor	VIP II	Dec-15		Finland	Finance and accounting software and services to the SME market across the Nordics
Skyscanner	VIP II	Dec-15	Dec-16	United Kingdom	Global travel metasearch engine
Unifaun	VIP II	Feb-16		Sweden	provider of transport management software to shippers and carriers
SnapLogic	VIP II	Dec-16		United States	Self service integration software
Phlexglobal	VIP II	Dec-16		United Kingdom	clinical trial master file
Vestiaire Collective	VIP II	Jan-17		France	Leading European online marketplace for pre-owned luxury fashion items
OAG	VIP II	Feb-17		United Kingdom	Aviation information provider
EasyPark	VIP III	Dec-17		Norway	Parking marketplace
Sykes Cottages Ltd	VIP III	Oct-19		United Kingdom	Vacation Rental Management Company
