= 2010 North West 200 Races =

(United Kingdom) 2010 North West 200 Races

Race details
Date	11–15 May 2010
Location	Northern Ireland
Course	Road Course; 8.970 mi (14.436 km)

Superbike Race 1
Pole Position	Fastest Lap
(England) Steve Plater	(Northern Ireland) Alastair Seeley
118.450 mph	120.985 mph
Podium
1. (England) John McGuinness
2. (Isle of Man) Conor Cummins	3. (Northern Ireland) Alastair Seeley

Supersport Race 1
Pole Position	Fastest Lap
(Northern Ireland) Michael Dunlop	(Northern Ireland) Alastair Seeley
114.602 mph	115.582 mph

Podium
- 1. (Northern Ireland) Alastair Seeley
2. (England) Ian Hutchinson	3. (Northern Ireland) Michael Dunlop

Ultra-Lightweight 125cc
Pole Position	Fastest Lap
(Northern Ireland) William Dunlop	(Northern Ireland) Paul Robinson
96.739 mph	97.115 mph
Podium
1. (Northern Ireland) Paul Robinson
2. (England) Jon Vincent	3. (Belgium) Renzo van der Donckt

Superstock
Pole Position	Fastest Lap
(Isle of Man) Conor Cummins	(Northern Ireland) Michael Rutter
117.149 mph	119.588 mph
Podium
1. (Scotland) Keith Amor
2. (England) Ian Hutchinson	3. (Northern Ireland) Ryan Farquhar

North West 200
Pole Position	Fastest Lap
(England) Steve Plater	(Northern Ireland) Alastair Seeley
118.450 mph	121.875 mph
Podium
1. (Northern Ireland) Alastair Seeley
2. (Scotland) Stuart Easton	3. (England) John McGuinness

The 2010 North West 200 Races, the 71st running of the event, was held on Saturday 15 May 2010 at the circuit, dubbed "The Triangle", based around the towns of Portstewart, Coleraine and Portrush, in Northern Ireland.

The first Superbike race was won by John McGuinness followed by Alastair Seeley winning the first 600cc Supersport race. First-time winners at the North West 200 were Paul Robinson in the 125cc race and Keith Amor in the 1000cc Superstock Race. Amor's victory was also the first win for BMW and the first non-Japanese manufacturer to claim a victory since 1997. The Blue Riband event, the North West 200 Superbike Race, produced a second win of the meeting for Alastair Seeley and the first local winner of the race since Phillip McCallen in 1997 . The final race of the meeting, the 600cc Supersport 2 race was won by Ian Hutchinson.

New for the 2010 event was the introduction of the daytime practice on the Thursday rather than the normal evening slot. The reasons for the change includes giving the riders the opportunity to practice in conditions similar to race day and also because of the extra time allowing classes to run separately. Race Director Mervyn Whyte MBE said that "altering the time of the traditional Thursday practice session will dramatically improve overall safety at the event." In an additional bid to improve safety, Mather's Cross was widened at the end of 2009. For 2010 further modifications were made to the circuit to improve safety. A new purpose built chicane was introduced near Mather's Cross to reduce speeds at the corner and safety improvement were made to the area at Station corner. The changes means that the circuit is now 8.970 mi (14.436 km) long.

== Practice ==
During practice on Tuesday evening Stuart Easton set a new fastest speed trap time, touching 204 mph (328 km/h) on the approach to University Corner. Steve Plater who had set the fastest time in Superbike practice on the Tuesday was injured in an accident during Thursday practice. Plater suffering a broken arm when he came off his bike at Quarry Hill on the Coast Road section of the course.

== Races ==
The first event, the five lap Superbike race, was delayed by over-night rain to allow the circuit to dry and also due to a medical emergency at Metropole Corner in Portrush. The delayed race was reduced to four laps (35.744 miles). These delays along with another medical emergency lead to other race reductions, including the North West 200 being cut from six to four laps. The event remained dry and there were no major crashes or injuries. The only notable incident was Conor Cummins high-siding his bike on the exit of University Corner during the Superstock race. Cummins was uninjured.

== Results ==
=== Practice ===
==== Practice Times & Leaderboard Race 1 & 6 – 1000cc Superbike class ====
Rank	Rider	Tue 11 May	Thurs 13 May
1	(England) Steve Plater; 1000cc Honda	4' 32.662; 118.450 mph	5' 07.443; 105.034 mph
2	(England) John McGuinness; 1000cc Honda	4' 35.023; 117.416 mph	4' 42.600; 114.268 mph
3	(Scotland) Keith Amor; 1000cc BMW	4' 39.678; 115.461 mph	4' 35.561; 117.186 mph
4	(Isle of Man) Conor Cummins; 1000cc Kawasaki	4' 37.431; 116.397 mph	4' 35.729; 117.115 mph
5	(Scotland) Stuart Easton; 1000cc Honda	4' 35.775; 117.095 mph	4' 38.861; 115.800 mph
6	(England) Guy Martin; 1000cc Honda	4' 41.678; 114.642 mph	4' 36.283; 116.880 mph
7	(England) Michael Rutter; 1000cc BMW	—— No Time	4' 36.486; 116.794 mph
8	(Northern Ireland) Michael Dunlop; 1000cc Honda	4' 36.521; 116.780 mph	4' 49.720; 111.459 mph
9	(Northern Ireland) Ryan Farquhar; 1000cc Kawasaki	4' 38.141; 116.099 mph	4' 37.764; 116.257 mph
10	(Northern Ireland) Adrian Archibald; 1000cc Suzuki	4' 39.018; 115.734 mph	4' 41.231; 114.824 mph
11	(Northern Ireland) Alastair Seeley; 1000cc Suzuki	4' 39.427; 115.565 mph	4' 37.249; 116.473 mph
12	(England) Ian Hutchinson; 1000cc Honda	4' 40.946; 114.940 mph	4' 40.185; 115.252 mph
13	(Australia) Cameron Donald; 600cc Suzuki	4' 40.748; 115.021 mph	4' 46.267; 112.804 mph
14	(New Zealand) Bruce Anstey; 1000cc Suzuki	4' 42.474; 114.318 mph	4' 41.323; 114.786 mph
15	(England) Gary Johnson; 1000cc Suzuki	4' 41.882; 114.583 mph	5' 13.516; 103.000 mph
16	(Wales) Ian Lougher; 1000cc Kawasaki	4' 44.273; 113.595 mph	5' 49.938; 92.279 mph
17	(Northern Ireland) Denver Robb; 1000cc Suzuki	4' 44.796; 113.386 mph	4' 49.682; 111.474 mph
18	(Northern Ireland) William Dunlop; 1000cc Suzuki	4' 45.020; 113.297 mph	5' 01.612; 107.065 mph
19	(England) James McBride; 1000cc Yamaha	4' 47.743; 112.225 mph	—— No Time
20	(Republic of Ireland) Derek Brien; 1000cc Kawasaki	4' 49.717; 111.460 mph	5' 10.795; 1103.901 mph

==== Practice Times & Leaderboard Race 2 & 5 – 600cc Supersport class ====
Rank	Rider	Tue 11 May	Thurs 13 May
1	(Northern Ireland) Michael Dunlop; 600cc Yamaha	4' 45.607; 113.064 mph	4' 41.775; 114.602 mph
2	(England) Steve Plater; 1000cc Honda	—— No Time	4' 42.595; 114.270 mph
4	(Scotland) Keith Amor; 600cc Honda	4' 44.862; 113.360 mph	4' 42.573; 114.278 mph
5	(England) Ian Hutchinson; 1000cc Honda	4' 45.668; 113.040 mph	4' 42.605; 114.265 mph
6	(England) John McGuinness; 600cc Honda	4' 46.393; 112.754 mph	4' 43.174; 114.036 mph
7	(New Zealand) Bruce Anstey; 600cc Suzuki	4' 43.260; 114.001 mph	29' 31.931; 18.224 mph
8	(Northern Ireland) Alastair Seeley; 600cc Suzuki	4' 48.293; 112.011 mph	4' 44.134; 113.651 mph
9	(Northern Ireland) William Dunlop; 600cc Yamaha	4' 43.863; 113.759 mph	4' 44.216; 113.618 mph
10	(England) Guy Martin; 600cc Honda	4' 45.319; 113.179 mph	4' 44.741; 113.408 mph

==== Practice Times & Leaderboard Race 3 – 125cc class ====
Rank	Rider	Tue 11 May	Thurs 13 May
1	(Northern Ireland) William Dunlop; 125cc Honda	5' 33.806; 96.739 mph	7' 55.912; 67.853 mph
2	(Northern Ireland) Paul Robinson; 125cc Honda	7' 33.606; 71.190 mph	5' 35.468; 96.920 mph
3	(England) Chris Palmer; 125cc Honda	5' 38.797; 95.314 mph	—— No Time
4	(Belgium) Renzo van der Donckt; 125cc Honda	5' 42.277; 94.345 mph	5' 51.354; 91.907 mph
5	(Northern Ireland) Sam Dunlop; 125cc Honda	5' 42.544; 94.271 mph	5' 47.569; 91.907 mph
6	(England) Jon Vincent; 125cc Honda	5' 43.982; 93.877 mph	6' 05.722; 88.297 mph
7	(Northern Ireland) Nigel Moore; 125cc Honda	5' 45.919; 93.351 mph	5' 52.595; 91.584 mph
8	(Netherlands) Stephan Savelkous; 125cc Honda	5' 47.867; 92.829 mph	6' 06.826; 88.031 mph
9	(England) Phil Harvey; 125cc Honda	5' 51.137; 91.964 mph	6' 08.080; 87.731 mph
10	(England) Philip Wakefield; 125cc Honda	5' 52.863; 91.514 mph	6' 05.920; 88.249 mph

==== Practice Times & Leaderboard Race 4 – 1000cc Superstock class ====
Rank	Rider	Tue 11 May	Thurs 13 May
1	(Isle of Man) Conor Cummins; 1000cc Kawasaki	Cancelled; No Time	4' 35.648; 117.149 mph
2	(Northern Ireland) Ryan Farquhar; 1000cc Kawasaki	Cancelled; No Time	4' 37.764; 116.257 mph
3	(Scotland) Keith Amor; 1000cc BMW	Cancelled; No Time	4' 37.817; 116.235 mph
4	(Northern Ireland) Alastair Seeley; 1000cc Suzuki	Cancelled; No Time	4' 38.196; 116.076 mph
5	(England) Ian Hutchinson; 1000cc Honda	Cancelled; No Time	4' 38.305; 116.031 mph
6	(England) Steve Plater; 1000cc Honda	Cancelled; No Time	4' 39.111; 115.696 mph
7	(Wales) Ian Lougher; 1000cc Kawasaki	Cancelled; No Time	4' 39.502; 115.534 mph
8	(Northern Ireland) Michael Dunlop; 1000cc Honda	Cancelled; No Time	4' 39.763; 115.115 mph
9	(England) John McGuinness; 1000cc Honda	Cancelled; No Time	4' 40.514; 115.117 mph
10	(England) Michael Rutter; 1000cc BMW	Cancelled; No Time	4' 41.441; 114.738 mph

=== Race results ===
==== Race 1; Superbike Race final standings ====
Saturday 15 May 2010 4 laps – 35.744 miles

Rank	Rider	Team	Time	Speed
1	(England) John McGuinness	Honda 1000cc	17' 58.937	119.251 mph
2	(Isle of Man) Conor Cummins	Kawasaki 1000cc	+ 0.217	119.227 mph
3	(Northern Ireland) Alastair Seeley	Suzuki 1000cc	+ 0.553	119.190 mph
4	(Scotland) Keith Amor	BMW 1000cc	+ 7.520	118.425 mph
5	(Scotland) Stuart Easton	Honda 1000cc	+ 16.668	117.436 mph
6	(New Zealand) Bruce Anstey	Suzuki 1000cc	+ 17.246	117.375 mph
7	(Northern Ireland) Michael Dunlop	Honda 1000cc	+ 18.398	117.251 mph
8	(Australia) Cameron Donald	Suzuki 1000cc	+ 22.033	116.864 mph
9	(Northern Ireland) Adrian Archibald	Suzuki 1000cc	+ 22.622	116.802 mph
10	(England) Ian Hutchinson	Honda 1000cc	+ 35.057	115.498 mph

Fastest Lap: Alastair Seeley, 4'26.909 on lap 2 (120.985 miles per hour (194.706 km/h))

==== Race 2; Supersport Race final standings ====
Saturday 15 May 2010 5 laps – 44.71 miles

Rank	Rider	Team	Time	Speed
1	(Northern Ireland) Alastair Seeley	Suzuki 600cc	23' 19.992	114.969 mph
2	(England) Ian Hutchinson	Honda 600cc	+ 0.720	114.910 mph
3	(Northern Ireland) Michael Dunlop	Yamaha 600cc	+ 1.235	114.868 mph
4	(Scotland) Keith Amor	Honda 600cc	+ 1.332	114.860 mph
5	(England) John McGuinness	Yamaha 600cc	+ 1.755	114.825 mph
6	(Northern Ireland) Ryan Farquhar	Kawasaki 600cc	+ 2.074	114.799 mph
7	(Australia) Cameron Donald	Suzuki 600cc	+ 14.713	113.774 mph
8	(Isle of Man) Conor Cummins	Kawasaki 600cc	+ 15.022	113.749 mph
9	(Northern Ireland) William Dunlop	Yamaha 600cc	+ 15.959	113.673 mph
10	(Isle of Man) Dan Kneen	Yamaha 600cc	+ 24.067	113.026 mph

Fastest Lap: Alastair Seeley, 4' 39.386 on lap 3 (115.582 miles per hour (186.011 km/h))

==== Race 3; 125cc Race final standings ====
Saturday 15 May 2010 5 laps – 44.71 miles

Rank	Rider	Team	Time	Speed
1	(Northern Ireland) Paul Robinson	Honda 125cc	22' 09.114	96.804 mph
2	(England) Jon Vincent	Honda 125cc	+ 8.613	96.181 mph
3	(Belgium) Renzo van der Donckt	Honda 125cc	+ 20.224	95.353 mph
4	(United Kingdom) Neil Durham	Aprilia 125cc	+ 25.893	94.954 mph
5	(Netherlands) Stephan Savelkouls	Honda 125cc	+ 26.420	94.918 mph
6	(Northern Ireland) Samuel Dunlop	Honda 125cc	+ 26.557	94.907 mph
7	(Northern Ireland) Nigel Moore	Honda 125cc	+ 26.662	94.901 mph
8	(Northern Ireland) Wayne Kennedy	Honda 125cc	+ 1' 04.111	92.350 mph
9	(Wales) Dylan Davies	Honda 125cc	+ 1' 05.116	92.283 mph
10	(England) Philip Wakefield	Honda 125cc	+ 1' 12.783	91.778 mph

Fastest Lap: Paul Robinson, 5' 32.513 on lap 3 (97.115 miles per hour (156.291 km/h))

==== Race 4; Superstock Race final standings ====
Saturday 15 May 2010 5 laps – 44.71 miles

Rank	Rider	Team	Time	Speed
1	(Scotland) Keith Amor	BMW 1000cc	22' 46.565	117.781 mph
2	(England) Ian Hutchinson	Honda 1000cc	+ 0.169	117.767 mph
3	(Northern Ireland) Ryan Farquhar	Kawasaki 1000cc	+ 0.573	117.732 mph
4	(Northern Ireland) Alastair Seeley	Suzuki 1000cc	+ 0.939	117.701 mph
5	(England) Michael Rutter	BMW 1000cc	+ 8.185	117.080 mph
6	(Northern Ireland) Michael Dunlop	Honda 1000cc	+ 14.838	116.516 mph
7	(England) Guy Martin	Honda 1000cc	+ 15.275	116.479 mph
8	(Wales) Ian Lougher	Kawasaki 1000cc	+ 18.600	116.200 mph
9	(England) John McGuinness	Honda 1000cc	+ 18.821	116.181 mph
10	(Northern Ireland) Adrian Archibald	Suzuki 1000cc	+ 21.932	115.921 mph

Fastest Lap: Michael Rutter, 4'30.027 on lap 5 (119.588 miles per hour (192.458 km/h))

==== Race 5; North West 200 Superbike Race final standings ====
Saturday 15 May 2010 4 laps – 35.744 miles

Rank	Rider	Team	Time	Speed
1	(Northern Ireland) Alastair Seeley	Suzuki 1000cc	17' 41.186	121.245 mph
2	(Scotland) Stuart Easton	Honda 1000cc	+ 1.143	121.115 mph
3	(England) John McGuinness	Honda 1000cc	+ 1.294	121.098 mph
4	(England) Guy Martin	Honda 1000cc	+ 7.214	120.427 mph
5	(England) Ian Hutchinson	Honda 1000cc	+ 9.809	120.135 mph
6	(Scotland) Keith Amor	BMW 1000cc	+ 9.974	120.117 mph
7	(England) Michael Rutter	BMW 1000cc	+ 10.467	120.061 mph
8	(Northern Ireland) Michael Dunlop	Honda 1000cc	+ 20.342	118.965 mph
9	(Northern Ireland) Adrian Archibald	Suzuki 1000cc	+ 20.579	116.939 mph
10	(New Zealand) Bruce Anstey	Honda 1000cc	+ 36.421	117.222 mph

Fastest Lap: Alastair Seeley, 4'26.909 on lap 3 (121.875 miles per hour (196.139 km/h))

==== Race 6; Supersport Race 2 final standings ====
Saturday 15 May 2010 4 laps – 35.744 miles

Rank	Rider	Team	Time	Speed
1	(England) Ian Hutchinson	Honda 600cc	18' 29.915	115.992 mph
2	(Scotland) Keith Amor	Honda 600cc	+ 3.288	115.580 mph
3	(New Zealand) Bruce Anstey	Suzuki 600cc	+ 10.620	114.824 mph
4	(Northern Ireland) Alastair Seeley	Suzuki 600cc	+ 10.695	114.816 mph
5	(Northern Ireland) Michael Dunlop	Yamaha 600cc	+ 10.949	114.790 mph
6	(England) John McGuinness	Honda 600cc	+ 11.581	114.725 mph
7	(Isle of Man) Conor Cummins	Kawasaki 600cc	+ 11.717	114.711 mph
8	(Australia) Cameron Donald	Suzuki 600cc	+ 13.249	114.555 mph
9	(Northern Ireland) William Dunlop	Suzuki 600cc	+ 13.594	114.520 mph
10	(Northern Ireland) Ryan Farquhar	Kawasaki 600cc	+ 25.306	113.338 mph

Fastest Lap and new class record: Keith Amor, 4' 37.591 on lap 3 (116.329 miles per hour (187.213 km/h))

== See also ==
- North West 200 – History and results from the event
