= JacTravel =

Travel company

- Industry: Travel
- Founded: 1975; 51 years ago
- Founder: Jack Coronna
- Headquarters: London, United Kingdom
- Key people: Karen Robertson, Managing Director

JacTravel is a leading European Destination Management Company (DMC). JacTravel provides groups and Tailormade FIT products and services to the international travel trade including accommodation, transportation, attractions, catering, and guided touring. Long term specialists in England, Scotland, Wales, and the Island of Ireland, in recent years JacTravel has expanded its offer into France and key destinations in mainland Europe.

In August 2017, the company was acquired by Webjet and folded into WebBeds.

== History ==
The company was founded in 1975 by Jack Coronna.

In June 2014, JacTravel was acquired by Vitruvian Partners, a private equity firm.

In March 2015, JacTravel acquired TotalStay Group.

In August 2017, JacTravel was acquired by Webjet.

== Awards and recognition ==
- UKinbound Tour Operator of the Year 2016
- Queen's Awards for Enterprise for International trade
- 1000 Companies to Inspire Britain
