= 2006 North West 200 Races =

The 2006 North West 200 Races took place on Saturday 13 May 2006 at the 8.966 mile circuit, dubbed "The Triangle", based around the towns of Portstewart, Coleraine and Portrush, in Northern Ireland.

Steve Plater and Bruce Anstey both scored double victories at the meeting. Robert Dunlop also recorded the last of his 15 victories, winning the 125 cc event. The current course lap record was set by Steve Plater at 124.109 mph (199.734 km/h) during the Supersport race.

== Results ==
- Race 1 – DeWALT Performance Tools Superbike Race (6 laps – 53.66 miles)

Rank	Rider	Team	Time	Gap
1	Steve Plater	HM Plant Honda	26:21.927	
2	Bruce Anstey	TAS Suzuki	26:22.300	+ 0.373
3	John McGuinness	HM Plant Honda	26:27.639	+ 5.712
4	Cameron Donald	Robinson Concrete Honda	26:52.817	+ 30.890
5	Ian Lougher	Stobart Motorsport Honda	26:53.873	+ 31.946
6	Ryan Rainey	IFS Global Logistics Honda	27:05.237	+ 43.310
7	Les Shand	Robinson Concrete Honda	27:08.908	+ 46.981
8	Stephen Thompson	T&R Motorsport Honda	27:14.321	+ 52.394
9	Martin Finnegan	Alpha Boilers Klaffi Honda	27:15.110	+ 53.183
10	Ian Hutchinson	McAdoo Kawasaki	27:18.042	+ 56.115

- Race 2 – Club Soi Portrush 600cc Supersport Race (5 laps – 44.694 miles)

Rank	Rider	Team	Time	Gap
1	Bruce Anstey	TAS Suzuki	23:08.380	
2	Les Shand	Wilson Craig Honda	23:10.146	+ 1.766
3	Ian Lougher	Blackhorse Finance Honda	23:13.499	+ 5.119
4	Stuart Easton	Lloyds British Ducati	23:22.434	+ 14.054
5	Alastair Seeley	William Watt Yamaha	23:22.552	+ 14.172
6	Guy Martin	AIM Racing Yamaha	23:24.825	+ 16.445
7	Raymond Porter	JD's Motorcycles Yamaha	23:29.484	+ 21.104
8	Davy Morgan	Team DMRR Honda	23:44.660	+ 36.280
9	Adrian Archibald	Team Racing Yamaha	23:45.480	+ 37.100
10	Darran Lindsay	Donut Tree Honda	23:48.186	+ 39.806

New Lap Record: Bruce Anstey, 116.743 mph

- Race 3 – Greenline Hire 250cc Race (5 laps – 44.694 miles)

Rank	Rider	Team	Time	Gap
1	Nigel Beattie	Mannin Collections Honda	24:58.517	
2	Darren Burns	S Gas Northern Ireland Honda	24:59.102	+ 0.585
3	Benny Jerzenbeck	Motorcycle Competition Honda	24:59.589	+ 1.072
4	Barry Davidson	Cleaver Browne Honda	25:02.405	+ 3.888
5	Paul Owen	Rapid Racing Honda	25:03.439	+ 4.922
6	Bruce Dunn	Yamaha	25:38.864	+ 40.347
7	Brian Spooner	C G Chell Yamaha	25:41.599	+ 43.082
8	David Mateer	Yamaha	25:41.763	+ 43.246
9	Ian Morrell	Honda	25:42.116	+ 43.599
10	Andrew Courtney	System 10 Honda	26:06.978	+ 1:08.461

- Race 3a – WRT Group 125/400cc Race (5 laps – 44.694 miles)

Rank	Rider	Team	Time	Gap
1	Robert Dunlop	Kennedy Equipment Honda	26:12.612	
2	Michael Wilcox	Honda	26:12.805	+ 0.193
3	David Madsen-Mygdal	Honda 400	26:33.686	+ 21.074
4	Richie Welsh	Yamaha 400	26:34.807	+ 22.195
5	David Lemon	JDR Property Developments Honda	26:38.064	+ 25.452
6	Oliver Linsdell	Flitwick Motorcycles Yamaha 400	26:50.413	+ 37.801
7	Manfred Vogl	Kawasaki 400	27:00.956	+ 48.344
8	Johnny McCay	Kawasaki 400	27:05.375	+ 52.763
9	Mark Parrett	Intersport Yamaha 400	27:06.113	+ 53.501
10	Mark Lunney	KRB Honda	27:08.092	+ 55.480

New Lap Record: Robert Dunlop, 103.153 mph

- Race 4 – CP Hire Superstock Race (5 laps – 44.694 miles)

Rank	Rider	Team	Time	Gap
1	Bruce Anstey	TAS Suzuki	22:25.575	
2	Raymond Porter	JD's Motorcycles Yamaha	22:26.072	+ 0.497
3	Ian Hutchinson	McAdoo Kawasaki	22:26.606	+ 1.031
4	Guy Martin	AIM Racing Yamaha	22:40.269	+ 14.694
5	Stephen Thompson	T&R Motorsport Suzuki	22:44.785	+ 19.210
6	Keith Amor	Suzuki	22:46.273	+ 20.698
7	Ian Lougher	Blackhorse Finance Honda	22:46.606	+ 21.031
8	Ryan Rainey	Tillston's Motorcycles Suzuki	22:48.218	+ 22.643
9	Conor Cummins	Yamaha	22:49.691	+ 24.116
10	Phil Stewart	Suzuki	23:02.652	+ 37.077

New Lap Record: Ian Hutchinson, 120.142 mph

- Race 5 – Black Horse Motorcycle Finance NW200 Superbike Race (6 laps – 53.66 miles)

Rank	Rider	Team	Time	Gap
1	Steve Plater	HM Plant Honda	26:04.975	
2	Michael Rutter	Stobart Motorsport Honda	26:07.546	+ 2.571
3	John McGuinness	HM Plant Honda	26:28.758	+ 23.783
4	Cameron Donald	Robinson Concrete Honda	26:39.021	+ 34.046
5	Guy Martin	AIM Racing Yamaha	26:40.464	+ 35.489
6	Ian Lougher	Stobart Motorsport Honda	26:41.247	+ 36.272
7	Stephen Thompson	T&R Motorsport Honda	27:04.814	+ 59.839
8	Ian Hutchinson	McAdoo Kawasaki	27:06.296	+ 1:01.321
9	James McBride	Austin Powered Yamaha	27:17.699	+ 1:12.724
10	Keith Amor	Suzuki	27:28.750	+ 1:22.775

New Outright Lap Record: Steve Plater, 124.109 mph

- Race 6 – Ballymoney Borough Council 600cc Supersport Race (5 laps – 44.694 miles)

Rank	Rider	Team	Time	Gap
1	Ian Hutchinson	McAdoo Kawasaki	23:04.098	
2	Rob Frost	CD Racing Kawasaki	23:05.409	+ 1.311
3	Bruce Anstey	TAS Suzuki	23:05.819	+ 1.721
4	Alastair Seeley	William Watt Yamaha	23:09.662	+ 5.564
5	John McGuinness	HM Plant Honda	23:10.233	+ 6.135
6	Darran Lindsay	Donut Tree Honda	23:23.667	+ 19.569
7	Stuart Easton	Lloyds British Ducati	23:24.961	+ 19.863
8	Callum Ramsay	TAS Suzuki	23:47.208	+ 43.110
9	Guy Martin	AIM Racing Yamaha	23:47.642	+ 43.544
10	William Dunlop	Solitude Motors Yamaha	23:47.951	+ 43.853

New Lap Record: Ian Hutchinson, 116.881 mph
