= RL360° =

Company

RL360
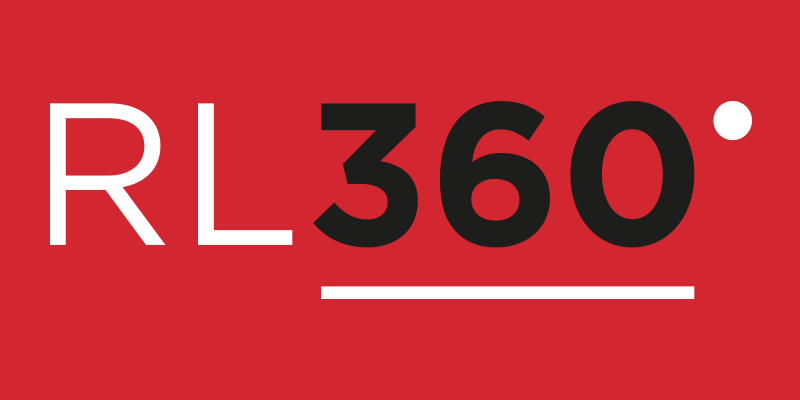
- RL360 Life Assurance Company
- Company type: Privately held
- Industry: Financial services
- Headquarters: Douglas, Isle of Man
- Area served: Worldwide
- Key people: CEO: Rob Allen
- Products: Offshore Savings & Investment Products
- Owner: International Financial Group Limited
- Website: www.rl360.com

RL360 Insurance Company Limited (RL360°) is an international offshore savings, protection and investment provider, headquartered in Douglas, Isle of Man, serving clients in Asia, Africa, the Middle East, Europe, the UK and Latin America. It is part of the International Financial Group Limited ("IFGL").

== History ==
RL360 in its present form came into being in November 2013 following a management buyout, though its origins can be traced back to 1991.

Scottish Provident International Life Assurance Limited (SPILA)

- SPILA was incorporated in the Isle of Man on 19 February 1991 as Hafnia Prolific International Life Assurance Limited.
- Hafnia Prolific International Life Assurance Limited was acquired by Scottish Provident Institution and changed its name to Prolific International Life Assurance Limited in March 1993.
- In 2000 SPILA’s parent company Scottish Provident Institution demutualised, and the business was transferred to the Abbey National Group.
- In December 2003 Abbey strategically focused on the UK and closed international new business in insurance and banking, concentrating solely on new business in the UK.
- Banco Santander acquired Abbey in November 2004.
- On 1 September 2006, Santander sold all of its life business to Resolution plc.
- In November 2006, SPILA received a license to reopen to new business in Hong Kong.
- SPILA was acquired by the Royal London Group in January 2009.

Scottish Life International

- Scottish Life established Scottish Life International Insurance Company (SLIIC) in the Isle of Man in 1996.
- Royal London Mutual Insurance Company Limited purchased the Scottish Life group of companies in 2001.
- In December 2008 SLIIC was renamed Royal London 360 Insurance Company Limited.

Royal London 360

- In June 2008 Royal London announced its intention to operate its two offshore life companies under a single brand and Royal London 360 was launched in January 2009.

RL360

- In October 2013, the Royal London 360 executive team formed the RL360 Group (now IFGL) which in November 2013, backed by private equity firm Vitruvian Partners, bought the company from Royal London and renamed it RL360.

Friends Provident International Limited

- On 19 July 2017 IFGL announced it had entered into a deal to acquire FPIL from the Aviva Group, subject to regulatory approval.
- On 16 July 2020 RL360’s parent company IFGL completed the deal to acquire Friends Provident International (FPI) from Aviva.

== Subsidiaries ==
Clerical Medical International Ltd

- CMI was one of the first international life assurance operations to be established by a UK company in 1987.
- Following a number of ownership changes, it became a closed book of business in March 2012.
- On 1 December 2015 RL360 acquired CMI, with its c.16,000 policies and more than £4bn assets under management.
- On 5 April 2016 CMI was renamed RL360 Life Insurance Company Limited and re-branded to RL360 Services.

Ardan International

- On 15 November 2016 the RL360 Group announced it was acquiring international platform business Ardan International, subject to approval from the Isle of Man Financial Services Authority, and the deal completed on 30 December 2016.

== Awards ==
- Best International Life Group (Non-UK Category) - 18th International Fund & Product Awards 2017
