= Police Mutual =

United Kingdome mutual society

Police Mutual Assurance Society
- Company type: Mutual, Friendly Society
- Industry: Financial services
- Founded: 1922
- Fate: transferred to Bspoke Group
- Headquarters: Lichfield, UK
- Website: policemutual.co.uk

Police Mutual is a UK-based provider of financial services and wellbeing support for members of the Police Service and their families. Founded in 1922 as a mutual society to promote the financial welfare of police officers, Police Mutual offers a range of products and services including savings, insurance, and financial wellbeing support. Membership is open to serving and retired police officers, staff, and their families.

In February 2014, Police Mutual acquired Forces Financial for an undisclosed fee.

On 1 October 2020, Police Mutual and its subsidiaries were transferred to The Royal London Mutual Insurance Society Limited, and the Police Mutual and Forces Mutual brands became trading styles of Royal London.

In 2024, Royal London completed the sale of the Police Mutual Healthcare and Police Mutual General Insurance businesses to the Bspoke Group, a specialist insurance group. As a result, Police Mutual is now part of the Bspoke Group, continuing to provide dedicated financial and wellbeing services to the police community under its established brand identity.
